= List of songs composed by Jerome Kern =

This is an alphabetical list of Jerome Kern songs. Jerome Kern (January 27, 1885 – November 11, 1945) was an American composer of popular music and, according to a joint resolution passed by Congress, "the father of American musical theater". He wrote more than 700 songs, including such classics as "They Didn't Believe Me" (1914), "Look for the Silver Lining" (1920), "Ol' Man River", "Can't Help Lovin' Dat Man", "Make Believe", "You Are Love" and "Bill" (all 1927), "The Song Is You" (1932), "Smoke Gets in Your Eyes", "Yesterdays" and "Let's Begin" (all 1933), "I Won't Dance" (1935), "A Fine Romance" and "The Way You Look Tonight" (both 1936), "All the Things You Are" (1939) and "I'm Old Fashioned" (1942). His career spanned dozens of Broadway musicals and Hollywood films from 1902 until his death.

== A ==
- "Abraham Lincoln Had Just One Country" – donated by Kern to the country (1941) for the Defense Bonds campaign
- "All in Fun" (1939) – lyrics by Oscar Hammerstein II – from the musical Very Warm for May
- "All the Things You Are" (1939) – lyrics by Oscar Hammerstein II – from Very Warm for May
- "All Through the Day" – lyrics by Oscar Hammerstein II – from the 1946 film Centennial Summer – nominated for the Academy Award for Best Original Song
- "Allegheny Al" – lyrics by Oscar Hammerstein II – from the 1937 film High, Wide, and Handsome
- "Anything May Happen Any Day" – lyrics by Graham John – cut from the 1930 show Ripples
- "April Fooled Me" – lyrics by Dorothy Fields

== B ==
- "Babes in the Wood" – from the 1915 musical Very Good Eddie
- "Bill" – lyrics by P.G. Wodehouse – from the 1927 musical Show Boat

== C ==
- "Can I Forget You?" – lyrics by Oscar Hammerstein II – from the 1937 film High, Wide, and Handsome
- "Can't Help Lovin' Dat Man" – lyrics by Oscar Hammerstein II – from the 1927 musical Show Boat
- "Can't Help Singing" – lyrics by E. Y. Harburg – from the 1944 musical of the same name
- "Cleopatterer" – lyrics by P. G. Wodehouse – from the 1917 musical Leave It to Jane
- "Cotton Blossom" – lyrics by Oscar Hammerstein II – from the 1927 musical Show Boat

== D ==
- "Day Dreaming" – lyrics by Gus Kahn – 1941
- "Dearly Beloved" – lyrics by Johnny Mercer – from the 1942 film You Were Never Lovelier – nominated for the Academy Award for Best Original Song

== E ==
- "Every Girl in All America" – lyrics by Berton Braley – 1918

== F ==
- "A Fine Romance" – lyrics by Dorothy Fields – from the 1936 film Swing Time
- "The Folks Who Live on the Hill" – lyrics by Oscar Hammerstein II – from the 1937 film High, Wide, and Handsome

== G ==
- "Go Little Boat" – lyrics by P. G. Wodehouse – from the musical show Miss 1917

== H ==
- "Heaven in My Arms" – lyrics by Oscar Hammerstein II – from the 1939 musical show Very Warm for May
- "High, Wide, and Handsome" – lyrics by Oscar Hammerstein II – from the 1937 film High, Wide, and Handsome
- "How'd You Like to Spoon with Me" – lyrics by Edward Laska – from the 1905 musical show The Earl and the Girl

== I ==
- "I Dream Too Much" – lyrics by Dorothy Fields – from the 1935 film of the same name
- "I Got Love" – lyrics by Dorothy Fields – from the 1935 film of the same name
- "I Won't Dance" – lyrics by Oscar Hammerstein II and Dorothy Fields – from the 1935 film Roberta
- "I'll Be Hard to Handle" – lyrics by Bernard Dougall – from the 1933 Broadway musical Roberta
- "I'm Old Fashioned" – lyrics by Johnny Mercer – from the 1942 film You Were Never Lovelier
- "In Egern on the Tegern See" – lyrics by Oscar Hammerstein II – from the 1932 Broadway musical Music in the Air
- "In Love in Vain" – lyrics by Leo Robin – from the 1946 film Centennial Summer
- "I've Told Ev'ry Little Star" – lyrics by Oscar Hammerstein II – from the 1932 musical show Music in the Air

== J ==
- "Just Let Me Look at You" – lyrics by Dorothy Fields from the 1938 film Joy of Living

== K ==
- "Ka-lu-a" – lyrics by Anne Caldwell – from the 1921 musical show Good Morning, Dearie

== L ==
- "The Land Where the Good Songs Go" – lyrics by P. G. Wodehouse – from the musical show Miss 1917
- "The Last Time I Saw Paris" (1940) – lyrics by Oscar Hammerstein II – winner of the 1941 Academy Award for Best Original Song
- "Leave it to Jane" – lyrics by P. G. Wodehouse – from the 1917 musical of the same name
- "Left All Alone Again Blues" – recorded by "hillbilly" musician, Lowe Stokes (one of the Skillet Lickers fiddlers)
- "Let's Begin" – lyrics by Otto Harbach – from the 1933 Broadway musical Roberta
- "Life Upon the Wicked Stage" – lyrics by Oscar Hammerstein II – from the musical Show Boat
- "Lonesome Walls – lyrics by Du Bose Heyward from the 1939 stage adaptation of the novel Mamba's Daughters
- "Long Ago (and Far Away)" – lyrics by Ira Gershwin – from the 1944 film Cover Girl – nominated for the Academy Award for Best Original Song
- "Look for the Silver Lining" – lyrics by B.G. DeSylva – from the 1920 musical Sally
- "Lovely to Look At" – lyrics by Dorothy Fields – from the 1935 film Roberta – nominated for the Academy Award for Best Original Song

== M ==
- "The Magic Melody" – from Nobody Home (1915)
- "Make Believe" – lyrics by Oscar Hammerstein II – from the musical Show Boat
- "Make Way For Tomorrow" – lyrics by Ira Gershwin and E. Y. Harburg – from the 1944 film Cover Girl
- "Mark Twain: Portrait for Orchestra" (1942)
- "More and More" - lyrics by E. Y. Harburg - from the 1944 film Can't Help Singing - nominated for the Academy Award for Best Original Song

== N ==
- "Never Gonna Dance" (1936) – lyrics by Dorothy Fields – from the 1936 film Swing Time
- "The Night Was Made for Love" – lyrics by Otto Harbach – from the 1931 Broadway musical The Cat and the Fiddle
- "Nobody Else But Me" (1946) – lyrics by Oscar Hammerstein II – from the 1946 revival of the musical Show Boat

== O ==
- "Ol' Man River" – lyrics by Oscar Hammerstein II – from the 1927 musical Show Boat
- "One More Dance" – lyrics by Oscar Hammerstein II – from the 1932 musical Music in the Air

== P, Q ==
- "Pick Yourself Up" – lyrics by Dorothy Fields – from the 1936 film Swing Time
- "Poor Pierrot" – lyrics by Otto Harbach – from the 1931 Broadway musical The Cat and the Fiddle
- "Put Me to the Test" – lyrics by Ira Gershwin – from the 1944 film Cover Girl

== R ==
- "Raggedy Ann" – lyrics by Anne Caldwell

== S ==
- "She Didn't Say Yes" – lyrics by Otto Harbach – from the 1931 Broadway musical The Cat and the Fiddle
- "The Show Must Go On" – lyrics by Ira Gershwin – from the 1944 film Cover Girl
- "The Siren's Song" – lyrics by P. G. Wodehouse – from the 1917 Broadway musical Leave It to Jane
- "Smoke Gets in Your Eyes" (1933) – lyrics by Otto Harbach – from the 1933 Broadway musical Roberta
- "Some Sort of Somebody" – used in both Miss Information and Very Good Eddie (both 1915)
- "Something Had to Happen" – lyrics by Otto Harbach – from the 1933 Broadway musical Roberta
- "The Song Is You" – lyrics by Oscar Hammerstein II – from the 1932 Broadway musical Music in the Air
- "Sunny" – lyrics by Oscar Hammerstein II and Otto Harbach – from the 1925 Broadway musical of the same name
- "Sure Thing" – lyrics by Ira Gershwin – from the 1944 film Cover Girl

== T ==
- "They Didn't Believe Me" – lyrics by Herbert Reynolds – from the musical The Girl from Utah (1914)
- "The Things I Want" – lyrics by Oscar Hammerstein II – from the 1937 film High, Wide, and Handsome
- "Till the Clouds Roll By" – lyrics by Kern, Guy Bolton and P. G. Wodehouse – from the 1917 Broadway musical Oh, Boy!
- "The Touch of Your Hand" – lyrics by Otto Harbach – from the 1933 Broadway musical Roberta

== U, V ==
- "Up With The Lark" – from the 1946 film Centennial Summer

== W ==
- "The Way You Look Tonight" – lyrics by Dorothy Fields – from the 1936 film Swing Time – winner of the 1936 Academy Award for Best Original Song
- "Where's the Mate for Me?" – lyrics by Oscar Hammerstein II – from the 1927 musical Show Boat
- "Who?" – lyrics by Otto Harbach and Oscar Hammerstein II – from the 1925 musical Sunny
- "Who's Complaining?" – lyrics by Ira Gershwin – from the 1944 film Cover Girl
- "Whose Baby Are You?" – lyrics by Anne Caldwell – from the 1920 musical The Night Boat
- "Why Do I Love You?" – lyrics by Oscar Hammerstein II – from the 1927 musical Show Boat
- "Why Was I Born?" – lyrics by Oscar Hammerstein II – from the 1929 musical Sweet Adeline
- "Will You Marry Me Tomorrow, Maria?" – lyrics by Oscar Hammerstein II – from the 1937 film High, Wide, and Handsome

== Y ==
- "Yesterdays" – lyrics by Otto Harbach – from the 1933 Broadway musical Roberta
- "You Are Love" – lyrics by Oscar Hammerstein II – from the 1927 musical Show Boat
- "You Couldn’t Be Cuter" – lyrics by Dorothy Fields – from the 1938 film Joy of Living
- "You Were Never Lovelier" – lyrics by Johnny Mercer – from the 1942 film of the same name
- "You're Devastating" – lyrics by Otto Harbach – from the 1933 Broadway musical Roberta
- "You're Here and I'm Here" – from the musical The Laughing Husband (1914)
