= Helen Morgan (singer) =

American jazz singer and actress

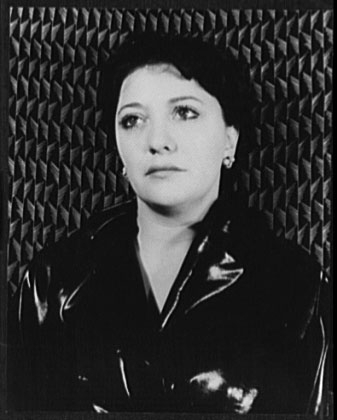
- Helen Morgan, 1935
- Born: Helen Emma Riggin; August 2, 1900; Danville, Illinois, U.S.
- Died: October 8, 1941 (aged 41); Chicago, Illinois, U.S.
- Resting place: Holy Sepulchre Cemetery; 41.689717°N 87.778503°W
- Occupations: Singer, actress
- Known for: Show Boat; Sweet Adeline
- Spouses: William R. Zeh (m. 1919, divorced) Lowell F. Almy (m. 1923, divorced) Maurice Maschke, Jr. (m. 1933; div. 1935) Lloyd J. Johnson (m. 1941)

Helen Morgan (born Helen Riggins; August 2, 1900 – October 8, 1941) was an American singer and actress who worked in films and on the stage. A quintessential torch singer, she made a big splash in the Chicago club scene in the 1920s. She starred as Julie LaVerne in the original Broadway production of Hammerstein and Kern's musical Show Boat in 1927, as well as in the 1932 Broadway revival of the musical, and appeared in two film adaptations, a part-talkie made in 1929 (prologue only) and a full-sound version made in 1936, becoming firmly associated with the role. She suffered from bouts of alcoholism. Despite her notable success in the title role of another Hammerstein and Kern's Broadway musical, Sweet Adeline (1929), her stage career was relatively short. Helen Morgan died of cirrhosis of the liver at the age of 41. She was portrayed by Polly Bergen in the Playhouse 90 drama The Helen Morgan Story and by Ann Blyth in the 1957 biopic based on the television drama.

== Early life ==
She was born Helen Riggins in 1900 in Danville, Illinois, United States. Her father, Frank Riggin, was a farmer in Davis Township, Fountain County, Indiana. After her mother, Lulu Lang Riggin, divorced and remarried, she changed her last name to Morgan. Her mother's second marriage ended in divorce, and she moved to Chicago with her daughter. Helen never finished school beyond the eighth grade, and worked a variety of unskilled occupations. She worked as an extra in films. By the age of 20, Morgan had taken voice lessons and started singing in speakeasies in Chicago. Her voice was not fashionable during the 1920s for the kind of songs in which she specialized; nevertheless, she became a wildly popular torch singer. A draped-over-the-piano pose became her signature while performing at Billy Rose's Backstage Club in 1925. Morgan became a heavy drinker and was often reportedly drunk during these performances.

== Career ==
Morgan was noticed by Florenz Ziegfeld while dancing in the chorus of his production of Sally in 1923. She went on to perform with the Ziegfeld Follies in 1931, the Follies' last active year. During this period, she studied music at the Metropolitan Opera in her free time. In 1927, Morgan appeared as Julie LaVerne in the original cast of Show Boat, her best-known role. She sang "Bill" (lyrics by P.G. Wodehouse, music by Jerome Kern) and "Can't Help Lovin' Dat Man" in two stage runs and two film productions of Show Boat over a span of 11 years.

During the run of Show Boat, however, Morgan's stardom led to difficulties. Her prominence in the world of New York nightclubs (actually illegal speakeasies in the era of Prohibition) led to her fronting a club called Chez Morgan, at which she entertained. On December 30, 1927, only days after the opening of Show Boat, she was arrested at Chez Morgan for violation of liquor laws. Charges were dropped in February 1928, and the club reopened as Helen Morgan's Summer Home, but she was arrested again on June 29 and this time indicted. A jury acquitted her at a trial held in April 1929.

After appearing in the 1929 film version of Show Boat, she went on to star in Kern and Hammerstein's Broadway musical Sweet Adeline. The title was a reference to the famous barbershop quartet song. She took the role of burlesque star Kitty Darling in Rouben Mamoulian's 1929 classic feature film Applause, with stage act portrayals, as well as a cappella singing in private scenes.

== Personal life ==
Morgan was married four times. Her first husband was William Zeh, whom she married on July 3, 1919. Lowell Almy became her second husband on December 31, 1923. He was a fan she had met at a stage door while she was performing in Sally. On May 15, 1933, she married Maurice "Buddy" Maschke III, the grandson of longtime Ohio Republican Party leader Maurice Maschke. Morgan ended up suing Buddy Maschke for divorce in 1935. Her fourth husband was Lloyd Johnson, whom she married on July 27, 1941.

In 1926, Morgan had a daughter whom she gave up for adoption.

== Later years and death ==
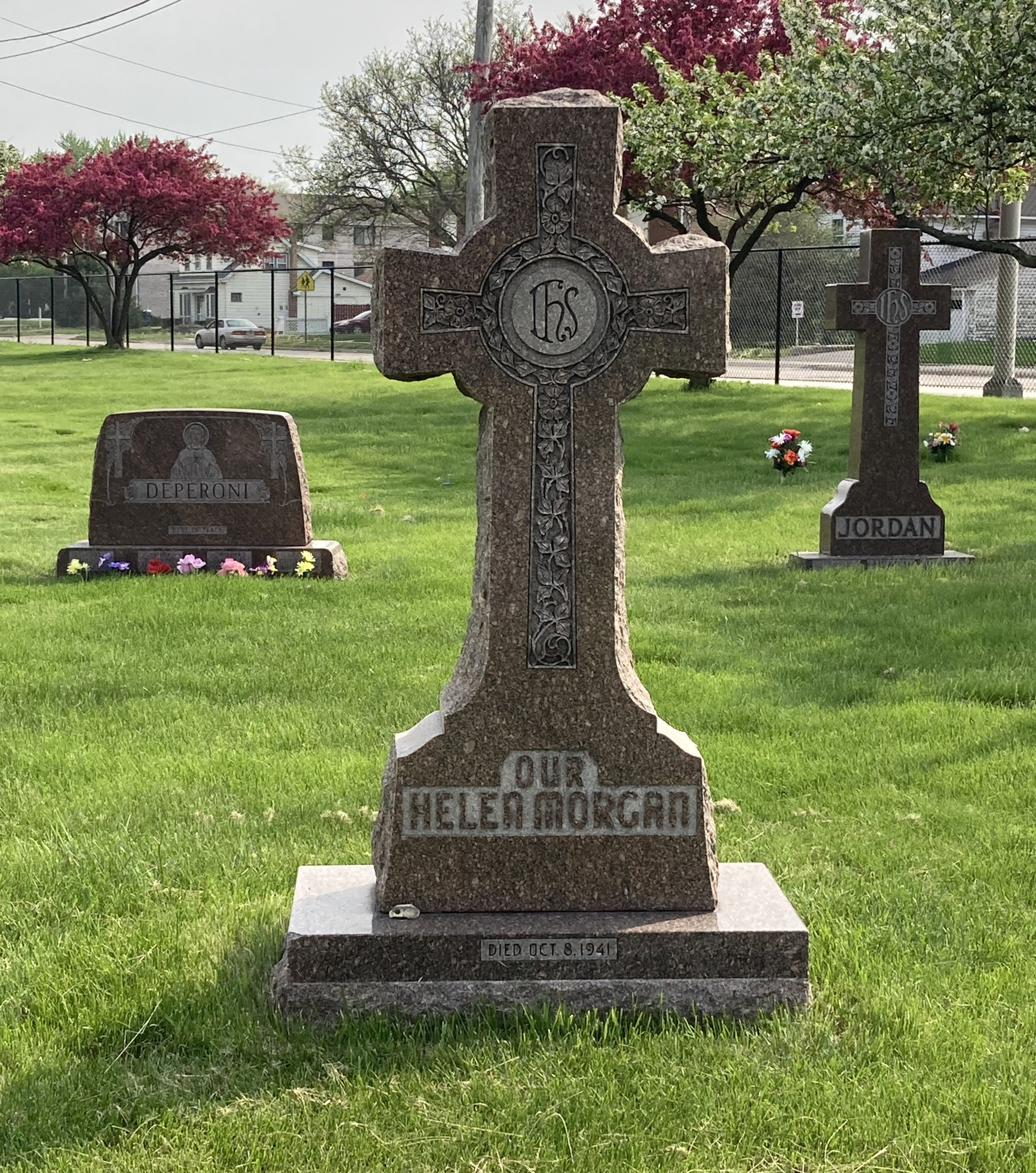
Morgan's grave at Holy Sepulchre Cemetery

Morgan starred in a radio program, Broadway Melodies, on CBS. The show, which featured light, popular, and semiclassical music, ran from September 24, 1933, to April 22, 1934. A later version, retitled Broadway Varieties and without Morgan, ran from May 2, 1934, to July 30, 1937. Morgan's last film appearance was in the 1936 version of Show Boat.

In the late 1930s, Morgan was booked for a show at Chicago's Loop Theater. She also spent time at her farm in High Falls, New York. Alcoholism plagued her, and she was hospitalized in late 1940, after playing Julie La Verne one last time in a 1940 Los Angeles stage revival of Show Boat. She made something of a comeback in 1941, thanks to her manager, Lloyd Johnston. However, the years of alcohol abuse had taken their toll. She collapsed onstage during a performance of George White's Scandals of 1942 and died in Chicago of cirrhosis on October 8, 1941. She was buried at Holy Sepulchre Cemetery in Alsip, Illinois.

== In popular culture ==
Morgan was portrayed by Polly Bergen in a 1957 Playhouse 90 drama, The Helen Morgan Story, directed by George Roy Hill. Bergen won an Emmy Award for her performance. That same year, the feature film The Helen Morgan Story starred Ann Blyth as Morgan.

== Filmography ==
- Six Cylinder Love, 1923
- The Heart Raider, 1923
- Show Boat, 1929 (in the prologue only, she appeared as Julie La Verne and sang "Can't Help Lovin' Dat Man" and "Bill")
- Applause, 1929 (sang "What Wouldn't I Do for That Man" and "Give Your Little Baby Lots of Lovin'")
- Glorifying the American Girl, 1930 (sang "What Wouldn't I Do for That Man")
- Roadhouse Nights, 1930 (sang "It Can't Go on Like This")
- The Gigolo Racket, 1931 short subject (sang "Nobody Breaks My Heart" and "I Know He's Mine")
- Manhattan Lullaby, 1933 short subject (sang "The Stork Song")
- The Doctor, 1934 short subject (sang "One Little Smile")
- Frankie and Johnny, 1936 (sang "Give Me a Heart to Sing To" and "If You Want My Heart")
- You Belong to Me, 1934 (sang "When He Comes Home to Me")
- Marie Galante, 1934 (sang "Song of a Dreamer" and "Serves Me Right for Treating You Wrong")
- Sweet Music, 1935 (sang "I See Two Lovers")
- Go into Your Dance, 1935 (sang "The Little Things You Used to Do")
- Show Boat, 1936 (as Julie La Verne, she sang "Can't Help Lovin' Dat Man" and "Bill")

== Stage ==
- Sally, 1923 (chorus)
- Scandals,1925–1926 (first principal role)
- Americana, 1926
- American Grand Guignol, 1927 (sang "Nobody Wants Me")
- Show Boat, 1927–1929 (as Julie La Verne she sang "Can't Help Lovin' Dat Man" and "Bill")
- Sweet Adeline, 1929–1931 (starring role singing "T'was Not So Long Ago", "Here am I", "Why Was I Born?", "The Sun About to Rise" and "Don't Ever Leave Me!")
- Ziegfeld Follies, 1931 (sang "Half-Caste Woman", lyrics by Noël Coward)
- Show Boat, 1932–1933
- Memory, 1934 (starring role singing "A Fool There Was")
- A Night at the Moulin Rouge, 1939
- Show Boat, 1940 (as Julie La Verne she sang "Can't Help Lovin' Dat Man" and "Bill")

== See also ==
- List of deaths through alcohol

== Bibliography ==
- Leckrone, Michael. Legendary Performers, The University of Wisconsin—Madison on March 22, 2010.
- Maxwell, Gilbert (1974). Helen Morgan: Her Life and Legend. New York: Hawthorn Books. ISBN 0-8015-4526-9.
