= Show Boat (1951 film) =

1951 film by George Sidney, Roger Edens

- Film poster
- Directed by: George Sidney
- Screenplay by: John Lee Mahin
- Based on: Show Boat; 1926 novel by Edna Ferber Show Boat; 1927 musical by Jerome Kern and Oscar Hammerstein II
- Produced by: Arthur Freed
- Starring: Kathryn Grayson; Ava Gardner; Howard Keel; Joe E. Brown; Marge Champion; Gower Champion; Agnes Moorehead; William Warfield
- Cinematography: Charles Rosher
- Edited by: John D. Dunning
- Music by: Jerome Kern
- Production company: Metro-Goldwyn-Mayer
- Distributed by: Loew's, Inc.
- Release dates: July 17, 1951 (Los Angeles); July 19, 1951 (New York City); September 24, 1951 (United States)
- Running time: 107 minutes
- Country: United States
- Language: English
- Budget: $2,389,000
- Box office: $7,621,000

Show Boat is a 1951 American musical romantic drama film, based on the 1927 stage musical of the same name by Jerome Kern (music) and Oscar Hammerstein II (script and lyrics), and the 1926 novel by Edna Ferber. It was made by MGM, adapted for the screen by John Lee Mahin, produced by Arthur Freed and directed by George Sidney.

Filmed previously in 1929 and in 1936, this third adaptation of Show Boat was shot in Technicolor in the typical MGM lavish style, while the basic plot remains unchanged. The film stars Kathryn Grayson, Ava Gardner, and Howard Keel, with Joe E. Brown, Marge Champion, Gower Champion, William Warfield, Robert Sterling, Agnes Moorehead and Leif Erickson. Unlike the 1936 film, none of the members of the original Broadway cast of the show appeared in this version.

The 1951 Show Boat was the most financially successful of the film adaptations of the show: one of MGM's most popular musicals, it was the second highest-grossing film of that year.

== Plot ==
When the show boat Cotton Blossom arrives in a Mississippi town to give a performance, a fistfight breaks out between leading man Steve Baker and Pete, the boat's engineer who has been making passes at Steve's wife, leading lady Julie La Verne. Pete knows a dark secret about the couple: Julie is part black and therefore their marriage is illegal. When Pete shows up with the town sheriff, Baker pricks Julie's finger and sucks blood from it, meaning he now has "negro blood" in him as well. Unfortunately, since black and white actors are not allowed onstage together, Cap'n Andy is forced to dismiss the Bakers along with Pete.

Julie's best friend Magnolia becomes the new leading lady and riverboat gambler Gaylord Ravenal is hired as her leading man. The two become successful, fall in love, and marry. They leave the boat and move to Chicago, where they live on Ravenal's gambling winnings until he goes broke and walks out on Magnolia.

Ellie Shipley and Frank Schultz, formerly the dance team on the show boat, take Magnolia to audition at the Trocadero nightclub, not realizing the club already has a singer: Julie Baker. Julie overhears Magnolia audition, learns from the nightclub manager that Ravenal deserted her, and quits so that he will have no choice but to hire Magnolia. Cap'n Andy attends her opening night, where he helps Magnolia conquer her stage fright. Magnolia reveals that she is pregnant with Ravenal's child. She returns to the show boat with Cap'n Andy, where she gives birth to a daughter, Kim.

About five years pass. Ravenal is gambling on board a packet boat, on which a drunken Julie is trying to sing. After punching her escort because he slapped Julie, Ravenal goes out on deck. Julie, who has been keeping track of Magnolia, finds out who Ravenal is, and not realizing that he knew nothing of Magnolia's pregnancy, tells him off. Ravenal is overcome with guilt and returns to the show boat the next day, where he meets his little daughter Kim for the first time and returns to Magnolia, with whom he is reconciled.

== Cast ==
(credited cast only)

- Kathryn Grayson as Magnolia Hawks
- Ava Gardner as Julie LaVerne (singing voice dubbed by Annette Warren)
- Howard Keel as Gaylord Ravenal
- Joe E. Brown as Cap'n Andy Hawks
- Marge Champion as Ellie Mae Shipley
- Gower Champion as Frank Shultz
- Robert Sterling as Steve Baker
- Agnes Moorehead as Parthy Hawks
- Leif Erickson as Pete (credited as Lief Erickson)
- William Warfield as Joe

Sheila Clark, who played Kim, Frances E. Williams, who played Queenie, Regis Toomey, who played Sheriff Ike Vallon, Emory Parnell, who played Jake Green, the Trocadero nightclub manager, and Owen McGiveney, who played Windy, were not billed either in the film or in poster advertising for it.

== Adaptation ==
For the 1951 Show Boat, Oscar Hammerstein II's dialogue was almost completely thrown out and new dialogue written by John Lee Mahin. The story was given a major overhaul, particularly near the end of the film. Changes included keeping the characters of Magnolia and Gaylord significantly younger at the end than in the play, and the expansion of the role of Julie to give her character greater depth. The film also somewhat sanitized the character of Gaylord Ravenal by having him leave Magnolia without finding out about her pregnancy. Kim (Magnolia and Ravenal's daughter) appears only as a baby and a little girl. Frank and Ellie, rather than being portrayed as unsophisticated, barely talented dancers as in the show, were made into a rather debonair couple in the style of Fred Astaire and Ginger Rogers. The aspects of the original stage version dealing with racial inequality, especially the story line concerning miscegenation, were highly sanitized and deemphasized, although the interracial subplot was retained.

Nearly all of the purely comic scenes, retained in the 1936 film version, were removed in the 1951 film. Much of the comedy in the show has no direct bearing on the plot. According to William Bayer's book The Great Movies, producer Arthur Freed maintained a strict policy of removing everything in the musicals that he produced if they did not advance the storyline.

== Production ==
According to George Sidney, MGM executives wanted Dinah Shore to play Julie. Sidney tested Shore but she "wasn't right" according to the director. So he tested Ava Gardner miming to a Lena Horne track and Gardner was cast.

Lena Horne was originally to have played Julie (after Dinah Shore, Peggy Lee and Judy Garland were passed over) as she had in the brief segment of the play featured in the 1946 Jerome Kern biopic Till the Clouds Roll By. But studio executives were nervous about casting a glamorous black actress in one of the lead roles, so Gardner was chosen instead. After some unfavorable sneak previews using her real voice in her songs, Gardner's singing voice was dubbed by vocalist Annette Warren. Gardner's vocals were included on the soundtrack album for the movie, and in an autobiography written not long before her death, Gardner reported she was still receiving royalties from the release.

The arrival of the boat was achieved by blending backlot footage showing the boat pulling in with location shots of crowds running along the bank of the real Mississippi River. The show boat itself remained moored on the MGM backlot. The full-scale stern-wheeler constructed on the backlot lake was sold off at the MGM property auctions for $15,000 in 1970 dollars.

== Reception ==
Contemporary reviews were positive. Bosley Crowther of The New York Times wrote a rave review, calling the film "so magnificent in so many ways" that it put the 1936 version "in the shade," for no previous screen version of the stage musical had ever been presented "in anything like the visual splendor and richness of musical score as are tastefully brought together in this brilliant re-creation of the show." Variety wrote that the film "takes to Technicolor with an accord that makes it seem no other treatment would be possible. Freed has dealt out his physical production values with a lavish and elegant hand, dressing the presentation with a sight appeal in keeping with the tune worth, and they have been brilliantly captured on film by Charles Rosher's cameras." Harrison's Reports called it "excellent ... It has been filmed twice before, but the color photography makes this version far superior." Richard L. Coe of The Washington Post wrote, "Old 'Show Boat' fans will admire this immensely and new ones will be won for what has been one of the most satisfying of our musical plays." John McCarten of The New Yorker wrote that "it will do for a summer's evening," but thought that only William Warfield measured up to any cast members of previous versions and that the other players on hand were "unobjectionable but hardly praiseworthy." The Monthly Film Bulletin wrote, "Although the musical numbers retain their original appeal, they are, in most cases, executed without much imagination or charm. Kathryn Grayson makes an indifferent Magnolia, Ava Gardner a bewildered and, at times, ludicrously over-empathic Julie. Only Howard Keel among the principal players suggests the dashing carefree charm needed for the part."

The film was a commercial success. During its initial theatrical run it earned $5,293,000 in the US and Canada and $2,328,000 in the rest of the world, resulting in a profit of $2,337,000.

Among recent critics, Garry Giddins stated that "MGM made a brash, highly successful Technicolor show", but "cleansing the material of racial complexity, period authenticity, and general sophistication" in contrast to other stage productions and the 1936 film. Giddins stated that it is "not a terrible movie, but it’s not much of a Show Boat, beyond introducing, in the greatly reduced part of Joe, the marvelous William Warfield (...)".

== Television ==
The film was first telecast on January 3, 1972, on The NBC Monday Movie. This marked the first time any production of Show Boat was telecast, with the exception of an experimental telecast in 1931 of a scene from the 1929 film version. NBC repeated the film on Saturday June 17, 1972. Several years later, the film went to CBS, where it appeared twice as a holiday offering on The CBS Late Movie. From there the film went to local stations and then to cable.

== Radio adaptations ==
Show Boat was presented on Lux Radio Theatre on February 11, 1952. The one-hour adaptation starred Ava Gardner, Kathryn Grayson, Howard Keel, William Warfield, Marge Champion and Gower Champion. A previous adaptation, based on the 1936 film version, had aired on June 24, 1940. That version featured Irene Dunne, Allan Jones and Charles Winninger reprising their screen roles.

== Music ==
- Main Title — MGM Studio Orchestra and Chorus ("Cotton Blossom" and an instrumental version of "Make Believe")
- "Cotton Blossom" — Cotton Blossom Singers and Dancers
- "Capt' Andy's Ballyhoo" — danced by Marge and Gower Champion (MGM Studio Orchestra)
- "Where's the Mate for Me" — Howard Keel
- "Make Believe" — Kathryn Grayson / Howard Keel
- "Can't Help Lovin' Dat Man" — Ava Gardner (Annette Warren singing for Ms. Gardner)
- "Can't Help Lovin' Dat Man" (Reprise #1) — Kathryn Grayson / Ava Gardner (Annette Warren singing for Ms. Gardner)
- "I Might Fall Back On You" — Marge and Gower Champion
- Julie Leaves the Boat ("Mis'ry's Comin' Round" — partial) - MGM Studio Orchestra and Chorus
- "Ol' Man River" — William Warfield and MGM chorus
- Montage sequence ("Make Believe") — MGM Studio Orchestra and Chorus
- "You Are Love" — Kathryn Grayson / Howard Keel
- "Why Do I Love You" — Kathryn Grayson / Howard Keel
- "Bill" — Ava Gardner (Annette Warren singing for Ms. Gardner)
- "Can't Help Lovin' Dat Man" (Reprise #2) — Kathryn Grayson
- "Life Upon the Wicked Stage" — Marge and Gower Champion
- "After the Ball" — Kathryn Grayson
- "Cakewalk" — danced by Joe E. Brown and Sheila Clark (MGM Studio Orchestra)
- "Can't Help Lovin' Dat Man" — (partial reprise by Ava Gardner, using her real singing voice)
- "Make Believe" (Reprise) — Howard Keel
- Finale: "Ol' Man River" (Reprise) — William Warfield / MGM Chorus

== Awards and honors ==
Awards
Award	Date of ceremony	Category	Recipients and nominees	Result
Academy Awards	March 20, 1952	Best Cinematography, Color	Charles Rosher	Nominated
Academy Awards	March 20, 1952	Best Music, Scoring of a Musical Picture	Conrad Salinger and Adolph Deutsch	Nominated

The film is recognized by American Film Institute in these lists:

- 2004: AFI's 100 Years...100 Songs:
  - "Make Believe" – Nominated
- 2006: AFI's Greatest Movie Musicals – Nominated

== Home media ==
As of 2014, this and the 1936 version are the only film versions of Show Boat to have been officially released on DVD. Warner Home Video, which owns the distribution rights to all three film versions of Show Boat, said it would release in 2007 a three-disc DVD release of all three film versions, but this still has not come to pass as of June 2016. A three-film laserdisc version was released by MGM/UA, while the 1936 film was released on Laserdisc through The Criterion Collection. Warner Archive Collection released this 1951 version in Blu-ray on February 23, 2021, sourced from a recent 4K scan of the film's Technicolor negatives.

== See also ==
- Show Boat (1929 film)
- Show Boat (1936 film)
