= Can't Help Lovin' Dat Man =

Song by Jerome Kern and Oscar Hammerstein II, from the 1927 musical play Show Boat

"Can't Help Lovin' Dat Man", with music by Jerome Kern and lyrics by Oscar Hammerstein II, is one of the most famous songs from their classic 1927 musical play Show Boat, adapted from Edna Ferber's 1926 novel.

Its music and lyrics entered the public domain on January 1, 2023.

== Context ==
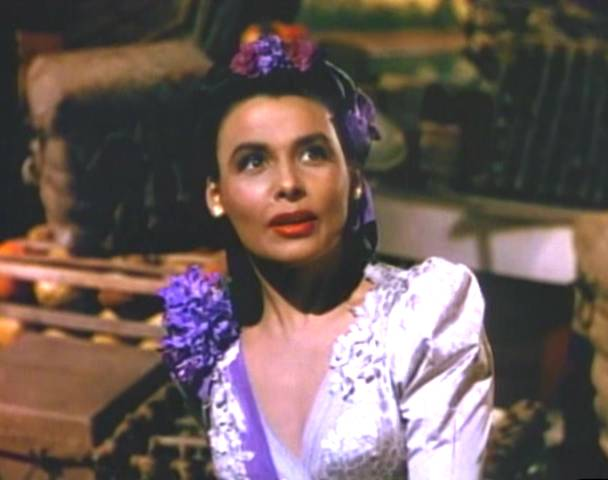
Lena Horne as Julie Laverne singing the song in a mini-production of Show Boat in Till the Clouds Roll By (1946), a fictionalized biography of composer Jerome Kern.

The song, written in a blues tempo, is sung in the show by several characters, but is most closely associated with the character Julie, the biracial leading lady of the showboat Cotton Blossom. It is Julie who is first heard singing the song – to Magnolia, the daughter of Cap'n Andy Hawks and his wife Parthenia (Parthy), owners of the showboat. In the musical's plot, the number is supposed to be a song familiar to African Americans for years, and this provides one of the most dramatic moments in the show. When Queenie, the black cook, comments that it is strange that light-skinned Julie knows the song because only black people sing it, Julie becomes visibly uncomfortable. Later, we learn that this is because Julie is "passing" as white – she and her white husband are guilty of miscegenation under the state's law.

Immediately after Julie sings the song through once, Queenie chimes in with her own lyrics to it, and she is joined by her husband Joe, the black stevedore on the boat. This is followed by Julie, Queenie, Magnolia, Joe, and the black chorus all performing a song-and-dance to the number.

== Repeated during Show Boat ==
The last refrain of the song is briefly reprised at the end of the first act by the ensemble, as Magnolia and riverboat gambler Gaylord Ravenal enter a local church to get married.

The song appears again in Act II of the show, when Magnolia uses it to audition for a singing job at the Trocadero nightclub after Ravenal has deserted her. From backstage, Julie, now the featured star there after having been forced to leave the show boat by the local sheriff, hears Magnolia sing the song. Now an alcoholic as a result of having been abandoned by her own husband, Julie secretly quits her job so that the manager, in dire need of a singer for New Year's Eve, will have no choice but to hire Magnolia.

== History of performances ==
"Can't Help Lovin' Dat Man" was strongly associated with 1920s torch singer Helen Morgan, who played Julie in the original 1927 stage production of Show Boat, as well as the 1932 revival and the 1936 film version. While Morgan was alive, she "owned" the song as much as Judy Garland owned "Over the Rainbow" (from The Wizard of Oz). However, Morgan died prematurely in 1941. Her recordings are seldom played or reissued today and her films are infrequently seen. The 1936 film version of Show Boat was taken completely out of circulation in 1942 to make way for MGM's 1951 remake, which featured Ava Gardner as Julie (with singing dubbed by Annette Warren). Therefore, modern audiences unfamiliar with the 1936 film have most likely never heard Helen Morgan's performance of the song, though various recordings of her singing it are available online.

The song was performed as a song and soft shoe dance by actress, singer and dancer Jessica Lange and actress and dancer Drew Barrymore, accompanied on piano by actor, singer and pianist Malcolm Gets, playing the roles of "Big Edie" Edith Bouvier Beale and her daughter "Little Edie" Edith Bouvier Beale and piano accompanist George Gould Strong, in HBO's 2009 dramatization Grey Gardens based on the 1975 documentary Grey Gardens.

Famous composer and "King of Satire" Tom Lehrer parodied the first two lines of the song in the 1959 song "She's My Girl", with the opening lines: "Sharks gotta swim, and bats gotta fly; / I gotta love one woman till I die". In 1965, as part of the album That Was the Year that Was, later, he quoted those lines in the song "Pollution": "Fish gotta swim, and birds gotta fly, / But they don't last long if they try".

== Lyrics ==
The original lyrics have been in the public domain since 2023; see the educational source for the entire song. The words emphasize an intense love, regardless of his money or accomplishment, as a force of nature likened to fish born to swim, or birds driven to fly. Within the play, the song is introduced as mixed along with the dialog:

(JULIE sings...)
Fish got to swim, birds got to fly,
I gotta love one man till I die,
Can't help lovin' dat man of mine.

(MAGNOLIA recognizes the song):
That's it...

(QUEENIE, re-entering, stops in her tracks and appears puzzled.)

(JULIE continues singing...)
Tell me he's lazy, tell me he's slow,
Tell me I'm crazy (maybe I know)
Can't help lovin' dat man of mine.

(QUEENIE questions how would white people know the song):
How come y'all know dat song?

Later verses lament that when he goes away, she is sad until he returns.

== Controversy ==
In its own way, the song is almost as controversial as the song "Ol' Man River" (also from Show Boat) because of some phrases, though its lyrics have caused less of an uproar because the "offensive" portion is sung not by Julie but by Queenie, and is therefore not usually heard outside the show. In her section of the song, Queenie sings about Joe:

My man is shiftless,
An' good for nothin', too.
He's my man just the same.
He's never 'round here
When there is work to do,
He's never 'round here when there's workin' to do.

This lyric was included in every production of Show Boat up until 1966, except for the 1951 film version, in which this section of the song was simply omitted. In the 1966 Lincoln Center production of the show, produced during the height of the Civil Rights era, this part of the lyric was completely rewritten by an uncredited writer to avoid any controversy, and it has remained that way ever since – except in the now-famous EMI 3-CD album set of Show Boat, released in 1988. The revised lyric went:

My man's a dreamer,
He don't have much to say
He's my man just the same
Instead o' workin,
He sits and dreams all day,
Instead o' workin', he'll be dreamin' all day.

The 1951 film version of Show Boat went even one step further than the 1966 stage revival in "smoothing out" any "edginess" about the song, by omitting all reference to it as one sung for years by African Americans, and thereby omitting the section in which Queenie remarks that it is strange for Julie to know the song. In the 1951 film, the song is simply a love song Julie sings about her husband Steve, not a folk tune. Lena Horne also sings it this way in Till the Clouds Roll By.

== See also ==
- Other songs from Show Boat: "Bill", "Ol' Man River"

== Additional references ==
- Kreuger, Miles Show Boat: The Story of a Classic American Musical, Oxford, 1977.
