= Let Us Begin =

Let Us Begin may refer to:

- "Let's Begin", 1933 song by Jerome Kern
- Let's Begin, EP by Clare Maguire
- "Let Us Begin", song by John Denver from album One World
- "Let Us Begin", song by Snoop Dogg from album Neva Left
