= The Red Petticoat =

The Red Petticoat is a musical comedy in 3 acts with music by Jerome Kern and a book and lyrics by Rida Johnson Young and Paul West. The Western-genre musical starred Helen Lowell as tough lady barber Sophie Brush in a fictional rough silver-mining town in Nevada, who gets her man. Songs included "I Wonder", "My Peaches and Cream", "Oh You Beautiful Spring", "The Ragtime Restaurant", and "Since the Days of Grandmamma". The musical was based on a 1911 farcical melodrama by Young titled Next!. It was Kern's first complete score.

After a tryout in Philadelphia, the show opened at Daly's Theatre on November 13, 1912, directed by Joseph W. Herbert, and moved to the Broadway Theatre, closing on January 4, 1913, after 61 performances. The critics praised the show and particularly the score. After the Broadway run, the show toured.

== Synopsis ==
"S. Brush" responds to an advertisement for a barber in the Nevada silver mining town of Lost River and is hired. Upon arrival, everyone is surprised that Sophie, the barber, turns out to be a woman. She and her employees open their hairdressing and manicure shop. Over time, Sophie helps the village gambler get married, cleans up the brothel and marries the school teacher's handsome brother.

== Characters and cast ==
- Parrot – Katherine Belkap
- Otto Schmaltz – James B. Carson
- Dora Warner – Grace Field
- Slim – Allen Kearns
- "Sage Brush" Kate – Frances Kennedy
- Sophie Brush – Helen Lowell
- Brick Oldham – Donald MacDonald
- Phyllis Oldham – Louise Mink
- Jack Warner – Joseph Phillips

== Musical numbers ==
Act I

- Sing, Sing, You Tetrazinni – "Sage Brush" Kate and Chorus
- I Wonder – Phyllis Oldham and Jack Warner
- The Correspondence School – Sophie Brush and Chorus
- Dance, Dance, Dance – Brick Oldham, Slim and Manicure Girls
- Little Golden Maid – Dora Warner and Brick

Act 2

- Oh You Beautiful Spring (lyrics by M. E. Rourke) – Dora and Chorus
- Where Did the Bird Hear That? – Sophie, Otto Schmaltz and Parrot
- (My) Peaches and Cream – Phyllis, Jack and Chorus
- The Ragtime Restaurant – Brick and Chorus
- A Prisoner of Love – Sophie, Phyllis and Dora

Act 3

- Walk, Walk, Walk – Brick and Chorus
- The Joy of That Kiss – Phyllis and Jack
- Oo-Oo-Oo – Otto and Girls
- Since the Days of Grandmamma – Sophie and Girls
- The Waltz Time Girl – Phyllis and Brick
