= Very Warm for May =

1939 musical composed by Jerome Kern, with a libretto by Oscar Hammerstein II

- Original Broadway Cast Recording
- Music: Jerome Kern
- Lyrics: Oscar Hammerstein II
- Book: Oscar Hammerstein II
- Productions: 1939 Broadway 1985 New York 2010 San Francisco

Very Warm for May is a musical composed by Jerome Kern, with a libretto by Oscar Hammerstein II. It was the team's final score for Broadway, after their hits Show Boat, Sweet Adeline, and Music in the Air. It marked a return to Broadway for Kern, who had spent several years in Hollywood writing music for movies, including Swing Time for Fred Astaire and Ginger Rogers.

Vincente Minnelli directed Very Warm for May, which opened at the Alvin Theatre on November 17, 1939. It contained such favorite songs as "All the Things You Are", "All in Fun", and "In the Heart of the Dark". Gerald Bordman, author of the definitive Kern biography Jerome Kern: His Life and Music, hailed the score as one of Kern's finest.

Billboard magazine saw the show pre-Broadway, and was enthusiastic: "Prophesied this venture will be a season's hit. The ballet corps keeps the audience awake and eager. Choreography is unique and excellent. Its lyrics, in numbers such as 'All the Things You Are' and 'Up in Harlem' will be taken up soon. Scenery and costumes are colorful, bizarre, and original. 'Very Warm for May' is not one show. It's a three-in-one with enough material for a couple more extravaganzas and maybe a crumb or two to spare."

Very Warm for May ran on Broadway for two months, with June Allyson, Eve Arden, Grace McDonald, Jack Whiting, and Vera-Ellen among the performers. It closed after 59 performances. It received mixed reviews, with the New York World-Telegram calling the show "Gay and delightful" and finding the songs to be "the most charming that Kern and Hammerstein have ever written", while Brooks Atkinson, of the New York Times, commented, "Very Warm for May is not so hot for November", and Robert Benchley of The New Yorker praised the show as "Lovely to the ear and complimentary to the intelligence...unlike most musicals, (it) actually gets better and funnier as it goes on."

Part of the mediocre response may have been due to a book that was changed at the last minute. Very Warm for May opened away from town with a plot that had Long Island society girl May Graham fleeing perilous gangsters and hiding out with an avant-garde summer stock troupe in Connecticut. Eve Arden portrayed a dizzy society matron. This first version of the show received rave reviews and played to sold-out houses. Producer Max Gordon had been away when the show opened out of town and when he saw it, he hated the gangster subplot and had it removed. However, New Yorkers did not seem to be as crazy about the summer stock story, having just seen Babes in Arms the year before.

It was a very competitive season on Broadway. One month after Very Warm for May opened, Cole Porter's Du Barry Was a Lady, DeSylva and Henderson's George White's Scandals and Rodgers and Hart's Too Many Girls all opened. Very Warm for May is a quintessential "lost musical from the 1930s" because of its enduring score by two Broadway legends and its surprisingly quick disappearance from the theatre scene.

In 1984, recordings of the original cast performances from 1939 were discovered and were assembled to form a long playing (LP) album and thus became the oldest Original Broadway Cast Recording. With notes by Gerald Bordman, the album received a Nomination for a Grammy Award in 1985 as Best Cast Show Album. It was subsequently released as a compact disc and later became available on iTunes. The recordings, however, are actually from a promotional radio show and not an attempt to faithfully record the full score. Several songs from the show are missing, and "All the Things You Are" appears four times on the collection.

Very Warm for May was transferred (loosely) to the silver screen for the MGM movie Broadway Rhythm (1944) with only "All the Things You Are" retained from the musical and the plot rewritten yet again. The actor George Murphy plays snippets of songs from the original score while seated at a piano awaiting the arrival of leading lady Ginny Simms.

Stephen Sondheim has cited Very Warm for May as an inspiration for his interest in the musical theater. Sondheim saw the original production at the age of nine.

Hammerstein refused to allow productions of Very Warm for May after Kern's death. In 1985, however, the Hammerstein and Kern estates finally authorized a performance by a small New York company, followed in 1994 by a Carnegie Recital Hall concert (with full orchestrations). San Francisco's 42nd Street Moon theatre performed it as a staged concert a year later in 1995. In May 2010, 42nd Street Moon produced a fully staged version at the Eureka Theatre, subsequently making it the West Coast premiere.

== Songs ==
Act I

- "In Other Words, Seventeen" - May Graham and William Graham
- "Stop Dance"
- "Characterization"
- "Babbling Brook Scene"
- "All the Things You Are" - Ogdon Quiler, Liz Spofford, Carroll and Charles
- "Winnie's Audition Scene"
- "May Tells All"
- "Heaven in My Arms" - Johnny Graham, Liz Spofford and Carroll
- "In Other Words, Seventeen" (Reprise) - Winnie Spofford

Act II

- "That Lucky Fellow" - Raymond Sibley
- "L'Histoire de Madame de la Tour" - Carroll, Miss Wasserman, Jane and Andre
- "That Lucky Lady" - May Graham
- "The Strange Case of Adam Standish, or Psycho-Analysis Strikes Back"
- "In the Heart of the Dark" - Carroll and Charles
- "Ballet Peculiaire"
- "In the Heart of the Dark" (Reprise) - Liz Spofford
- "The Deer and the Park Avenue Lady" - Andre and Miss Hyde
- "All in Fun" - Liz Spofford and Johnny Graham
- "High Up in Harlem"
- "All the Things You Are" (Reprise) - Kenny
- "All in Fun" (Reprise) - Kenny and Johnny Graham
