= You Are Love =

Song
- Published: 1927
- Composer(s): Jerome Kern
- Lyricist(s): Oscar Hammerstein II

"You Are Love" is a song by Jerome Kern and Oscar Hammerstein II from their classic 1927 musical play Show Boat. It is sung twice in the show - first, by Magnolia Hawks, the heroine, and riverboat gambler Gaylord Ravenal when they agree to marry near the end of Act I, and again in the penultimate scene of Act II by Ravenal when he returns to Magnolia after having deserted her for 23 years.

Some productions—notably the 1936 film version of the show—shift the song's Act II reprise to the show's final scene. (Both Magnolia and Ravenal sing the reprise in the film.) In the 1951 film version of the musical, the song is sung only once (by Howard Keel and Kathryn Grayson), and reprised instrumentally as background music in the final scene.

Reportedly, Jerome Kern hated the song even though he wrote the music for it, believing it too "operetta-ish", and unsuccessfully sought to have it deleted from the 1936 film.
