= Show Boat (1936 film) =

1936 film by James Whale

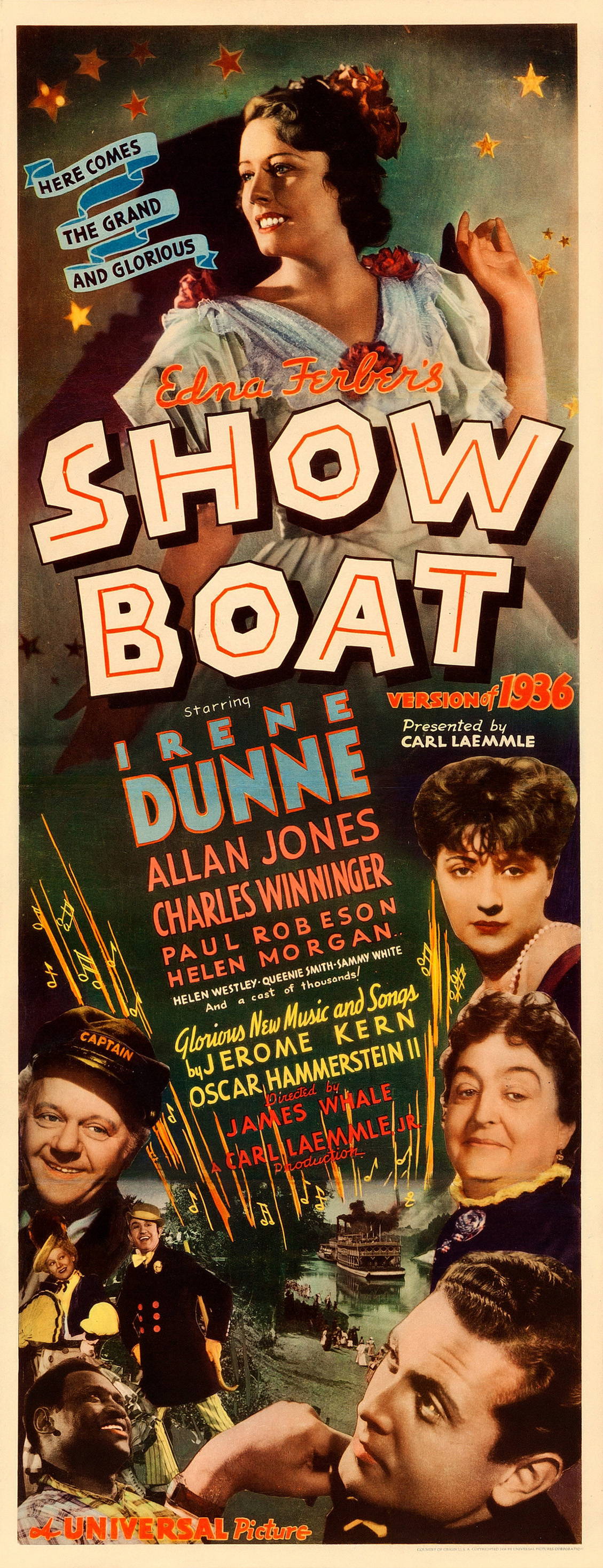
- Theatrical release three-sheet poster
- Directed by: James Whale
- Screenplay by: Oscar Hammerstein II
- Based on: Show Boat; 1926 novel by Edna Ferber Show Boat; 1927 musical by Jerome Kern and Oscar Hammerstein II
- Produced by: Carl Laemmle Jr.
- Starring: Irene Dunne; Allan Jones; Charles Winninger; Paul Robeson; Helen Morgan; Helen Westley
- Cinematography: John J. Mescall
- Edited by: Bernard W. Burton; Ted Kent
- Music by: Jerome Kern; Robert Russell Bennett; Victor Baravalle
- Lyrics by: Oscar Hammerstein II
- Color process: Black and white
- Production company: Universal Pictures
- Distributed by: Universal Pictures
- Release dates: May 14, 1936 (New York City); May 17, 1936 (United States)
- Running time: 113 minutes
- Country: United States
- Language: English
- Budget: $1,194,943

Show Boat is a 1936 American romantic musical film directed by James Whale, based on the 1927 musical of the same name by Jerome Kern and Oscar Hammerstein II, which in turn was adapted from the 1926 novel of the same name by Edna Ferber.

Universal Pictures had filmed the part-talkie Show Boat which was released in 1929. Carl Laemmle, head of Universal, had been deeply dissatisfied with that film, and wanted to make an all-sound version of the musical. It was originally scheduled to be made in 1934, but plans to make this version with Russ Columbo as the gambler Gaylord Ravenal fell through when Columbo was killed that year in a shotgun accident, and production of the film was rescheduled. The film, with several members of the original Broadway cast, began principal photography in late 1935 and was released in 1936.

In addition to the songs retained from the stage production, Kern and Hammerstein wrote three additional songs for the film. Two of them were performed in spots previously reserved for songs from the stage production.

== Plot ==
The musical's story spans about 40 years, from the late 1880s to the late 1920s. Magnolia Hawks is an 18-year-old on her family's show boat, the Cotton Palace, which travels the Mississippi River putting on shows. She meets Gaylord Ravenal, a charming gambler, falls in love with him, and eventually marries him. Together with their baby daughter, the couple leaves the boat and moves to Chicago, where they live off Gaylord's gambling winnings. After about ten years, he experiences an especially bad losing streak and leaves Magnolia, out of a sense of guilt that he is ruining her life because of his losses. Magnolia is forced to bring up her young daughter alone. In a parallel plot, Julie LaVerne (the show boat's leading actress, who is part black, but passing as white) is forced to leave the boat because of her background, taking Steve Baker (her white husband, to whom, under the state's law, she is illegally married) with her. Julie is eventually also abandoned by her husband, and she becomes an alcoholic. Magnolia becomes a success on the stage in Chicago. Twenty-three years later, Magnolia and Ravenal are reunited at the theater in which Kim, their daughter, is appearing in her first Broadway starring role.

== Cast ==
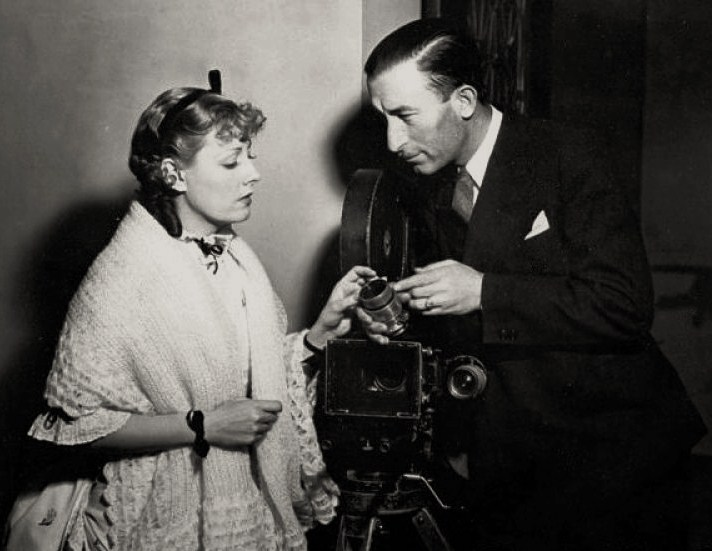
Irene Dunne and John J. Mescall (cinematographer) on the set of Show Boat (1936) - publicity still

- Irene Dunne as Magnolia
- Allan Jones as Gaylord Ravenal
- Charles Winninger as Cap'n Andy Hawks
- Paul Robeson as Joe
- Helen Morgan as Julie La Verne
- Helen Westley as Parthy Ann Hawks
- Queenie Smith as Ellie May Chipley
- Sammy White as Frank Schultz
- Donald Cook as Steve Baker
- Hattie McDaniel as Queenie
- Francis X. Mahoney as Rubber Face Smith
- Marilyn Knowlden as Kim (as a Child)
- Sunnie O'Dea as Kim (at Sixteen)
- Arthur Hohl as Pete
- Charles B. Middleton as Vallon
- J. Farrell MacDonald as Windy
- Clarence Muse as Janitor
- Charles C. Wilson as Jim Green (uncredited)
- J. Gunnis Davis as Doctor (uncredited)
- Eddie "Rochester" Anderson as Young Black Man (uncredited)

== Production history ==
This film version of Show Boat stars Irene Dunne as Magnolia and Allan Jones as Ravenal, with Charles Winninger, Paul Robeson, Helen Morgan, Helen Westley, Queenie Smith, Sammy White, Donald Cook, Hattie McDaniel, Charles Middleton, and Arthur Hohl. It was directed by James Whale, who tried to bring as many people from the stage production as he could to work on the film. (Florenz Ziegfeld, who died in 1932, had originally produced Show Boat onstage.) Winninger, Morgan and White had all previously played their roles in both the original 1927 stage production and the 1932 stage revival of the musical. Robeson, for whom the role of Joe was actually written, had appeared in the show onstage in London in 1928 and in the Broadway revival of 1932. Dunne had been brought in to replace Norma Terris, the original Magnolia, in the touring version of the show, and had toured the U.S. in the role beginning in 1929. Francis X. Mahoney, who played the brief role of the comic stagehand "Rubber Face" Smith, had also starred in the original production and in the 1932 Broadway revival, and would repeat his role in the 1946 Broadway revival of Show Boat, two years before his death.

This film also enlisted the services of the show's original orchestrator, Robert Russell Bennett, and its original conductor, Victor Baravalle, as the film's musical director and conductor. The screenplay for the film was written by Hammerstein.

The songs were performed in a manner very similar to the original stage version, not counting the three new songs written for the film. Many of the show's original vocal arrangements (by an uncredited Will Vodery) were retained in the film. "Why Do I Love You?" had been filmed in a new setting—inside a running open-top automobile—but was cut just before the film's release to tighten the running time. It is featured in all stage presentations of Show Boat, and if performed in its entirety is a long song, running six minutes and forty seconds. There is no word on whether or not the film footage has survived. According to a New York Times interview with Dunne, her rendition during the car ride was too jerky and her recording on a separate sound track too smooth, and the song was dropped. A hint of it, though, remains underneath the dialog. The music of the song is heard in the automobile sequence, in an earlier hotel lobby scene, and in the scene in which Magnolia receives Ravenal's farewell letter.

Out of time constraints, Whale was forced to delete much of his ending sequence, including a "modern" dance number to contrast with the romantic, "Old South" production number featuring Kim, and which was intended to highlight black American contributions to dance and music. In order to condense many years' time into the final reel of the film, a number of montages were employed, and up-tempo and down-tempo excerpts of "Gallivantin' Aroun'", arranged by Robert Russell Bennett, were used in place of dialog, or under incidental dialog. There was also to have been an additional reprise of "Ol' Man River", sung by Paul Robeson in old-age makeup as Joe, but this was deleted, and we never do see an aged Joe (or Queenie) in the film as released.

According to the film historian Miles Kreuger in his book Show Boat: The History of a Classic American Musical, great care was taken by director James Whale to ensure a feeling of complete authenticity in the set and costume design for this film.

== Reception ==
Frank S. Nugent of The New York Times called it "one of the finest musical films we have seen". Writing for The Spectator in 1936, Graham Greene gave the film a mildly positive review, characterizing the direction as "fine moneyed smoothness", and describing the film as "good entertainment, sentimental, literary, but oddly appealing". Greene also commented that the film had seen criticism from other viewers that the ending had suffered from "the extreme sentimentality and improbability of [the final] reunion". Abel Green of Variety called it a "tip-top filmusicalization" "in the best 1936 standard". He thought that Morgan's rendition of "My Bill" was a singular stand-out and Robeson's rendition and the cinematic treatment of "Ol' Man River" was "perhaps the single song-production highlight, although some may be captious a bit over the camera angles illustrating 'totin' the bales' and 'landing in jail'."

Lionel Collier, writing for the British magazine Picturegoer, described the film as "a straight forward melodrama accompanied by Jerome Kerne’s haunting melodies and staged excellently." He was impressed by several of the performances, particularly those of Irene Dunne who "deserves all your applause for an outstanding characterisation", Charles Winniger who provides "a perfect gem" in his scenes and Hattie McDaniel who gives a "clever" performance. He summed up his opinion with the observation, "I can give you no better reason for not missing this picture than that it provides real entertainment - and the main function of the screen is to entertain."

It was the 8th-most popular film at the British box office in 1935–36.

On the review aggregator website Rotten Tomatoes, 100% of 13 critics' reviews are positive, with an average rating of 9.1/10. Metacritic, which uses a weighted average, assigned the film a score of 88 out of 100, based on ten critics, indicating "universal acclaim".

== Temporary withdrawal from circulation ==
Although the film was critically acclaimed and successful at the box office, it was withdrawn from circulation in the 1940s, after Metro-Goldwyn-Mayer, which wanted to remake the film, bought the rights (and all prints) from Universal. MGM originally wanted to star Jeanette MacDonald and Nelson Eddy in the remake, but those plans fell through. MGM's Show Boat did not begin filming until late 1950, and was released in the summer of 1951 with Kathryn Grayson and Howard Keel in the leading roles.

In 1983 it made its debut on cable television, and a few years later, on PBS. It was subsequently shown on TNT and now turns up from time to time on TCM.

In 2014, a restoration of the film became available on DVD in the U.S. as part of Warner Home Video's Archive Collection line; and in 2020, a 4K restoration Blu-ray was released by The Criterion Collection.

== Musical additions ==
Ten numbers from the stage score are actually sung, with four others heard only as background music, and a tiny, almost unrecognizable fragment of the song "I Might Fall Back on You" is heard instrumentally at the beginning of the New Year's Eve sequence. Except for three new dialogue scenes, the final ten minutes of the film, and the three additional songs written for the movie by Kern and Hammerstein, the 1936 Show Boat follows the stage musical extremely closely, unlike the 1929 film and the 1951 version released by MGM. It is so faithful that even several instrumental pieces not by Kern which are regularly included as part of the show's score are retained in the film. The film also retains much of the comedy in the show.

The three new songs written by Kern and Hammerstein for the 1936 film are:

- "I Have The Room Above Her", a duet for Magnolia and Ravenal, sung in a new scene not included in the original play, but performed approximately in the spot in which the song I Might Fall Back On You was sung by Frank and Ellie, the comic dance team, in the show. "I Might Fall Back On You" is not sung in the film; a tiny fragment of it is heard instrumentally in the New Year's Eve sequence. Harold Prince included "I Have the Room Above Her" in his 1993 stage revival of Show Boat.
- "Gallivantin' Aroun'", a blackface number, not in the original (in which there are no blackface numbers, per se, although the original Queenie, Tess Gardella, did play her role in blackface). It is sung on the show boat stage by Magnolia, in place of the orchestral Olio Dance performed by Frank in the original play. Certain short excerpts of "Gallivantin' Aroun'", played in up-tempo, are utilized towards the ending of the film to signify the passage of many years' time, whereas certain other short excerpts of "Gallivantin' Aroun'", played in down-tempo, are utilized towards the ending of the film to represent Kim's first starring performance (seen, very briefly, before the film's final reprises of You Are Love and Ol' Man River).
- "Ah Still Suits Me", a comic duet for Joe and Queenie, written especially to expand both their roles, and sung in a new scene specially written for the film.

== Songs ==
- "Cotton Blossom" – mixed chorus of dock workers (song begins over opening credits)
- "Cap'n Andy's Ballyhoo" – Charles Winninger, danced by Queenie Smith and Sammy White
- "Where's the Mate For Me?" – Allan Jones
- "Make Believe" – Allan Jones and Irene Dunne
- "Ol' Man River" – Paul Robeson and men's chorus of dock workers
- "Can't Help Lovin' Dat Man" – Helen Morgan, Hattie McDaniel, Paul Robeson and levee workers, danced by Dunne and levee workers
- "Life Upon the Wicked Stage" (instrumental version) – show boat brass band (used as exit music from the Cotton Palace performances)
- "I Have the Room Above Her" – Allan Jones and Irene Dunne
- "At the Fair" (instrumental version) –show boat brass band
- "Gallivantin' Aroun'" – Irene Dunne and show boat chorus, danced by Irene Dunne and show boat chorus
- "Ol' Man River" (partial only) – Dock workers (humming)
- "You Are Love" – Allan Jones and Irene Dunne
- "Cakewalk from Act I Finale" – danced by levee workers
- "Ol' Man River" (partial reprise) – Paul Robeson in voiceover
- "Ah Still Suits Me" – Paul Robeson and Hattie McDaniel
- "Why Do I Love You" – heard as instrumental background music
- "Nun's Processional" – nuns' chorus (Sung in Latin)
- "Make Believe (reprise)" – Allan Jones
- "Bill" – Helen Morgan
- "Can't Help Lovin' Dat Man" (reprise) – Irene Dunne, danced by Sammy White
- "Goodbye, My Lady Love" – Queenie Smith and Sammy White, danced by them also
- "After the Ball" – Irene Dunne and Trocadero chorus
- "Make Believe" (reprise) (partial, and added to the film) – Allan Jones
- "Gallivantin' Aroun'" (instrumental reprise) – danced by Sunnie O'Dea and dancers
- Finale ("You Are Love" and "Ol' Man River") – Irene Dunne, Allan Jones, and, in voiceover, Paul Robeson

== Accolades ==
In 1996, this 1936 version of Show Boat was selected for preservation in the United States National Film Registry of the Library of Congress as being "culturally, historically, or aesthetically significant".

The film is recognized by American Film Institute in these lists:

- 2002: AFI's 100 Years...100 Passions – Nominated
- 2004: AFI's 100 Years...100 Songs:
  - "Ol' Man River" – #24
- 2006: AFI's Greatest Movie Musicals – #24

== Home media ==
Show Boat was made available on VHS beginning in 1990 (MGM/UA M301757). The Voyager Company, under its Criterion Collection Label, released two versions on laserdisc in 1989 of the 1936 version. One was a special edition with extras that included the history of show boats in general and its stage and film history, and the other was a movie only version. MGM/UA Home Video released the 1929, 1936 and 1951 versions, as well as the Show Boat sequence from Till the Clouds Roll By, as The Complete Show Boat collection on laserdisc in 1995. The 1929 version was restored and this release is the most complete version available. The transfer for the 1936 version is the same as the Criterion Collection and the 1951 was from the restored stereo release MGM had done earlier.

A Brazilian company, Classicline, released a poor quality DVD version in 2003.

In February 2014, a restoration of the film became available on DVD in the U.S. as part of Warner Home Video's Archive Collection line. The initial inventory will be filled by manufactured DVDs; subsequent inventory will be filled by DVDs-on-demand (DVD-Rs). Warner has since discontinued this edition.

In March 2020, Criterion released both a DVD and Blu-ray of this version, with footage from the 1929 version and commentary by Miles Krueger on both the feature film and the 1929 footage, both ported over from the CAV laserdisc release.
