= Centennial Summer =

1946 film

- Directed by: Otto Preminger
- Screenplay by: Michael Kanin
- Based on: Centennial Summer by Albert E. Idell
- Produced by: Otto Preminger
- Starring: Jeanne Crain; Cornel Wilde; Linda Darnell
- Cinematography: Ernest Palmer
- Edited by: Harry Reynolds
- Distributed by: 20th Century Fox
- Release date: August 1946
- Running time: 102 minutes
- Language: English
- Budget: $2,275,000
- Box office: $3 million (US rentals)

Centennial Summer is a 1946 American musical film directed by Otto Preminger. Starring Jeanne Crain and Cornel Wilde, the film is based on a novel by Albert E. Idell.

It was produced in response to the hugely successful 1944 MGM musical film Meet Me in St. Louis.

== Plot ==
The movie is about two sisters growing up in Philadelphia in the 1870s. They both fall for a Frenchman who has to prepare the pavilion for the Centennial Exposition.

== Cast ==
- Jeanne Crain as Julia Rogers (singing voice was dubbed by Louanne Hogan)
- Cornel Wilde as Philippe Lascalles (singing voice was dubbed by Ben Gage)
- Linda Darnell as Edith Rogers (singing voice was dubbed by Kay St. Germain Wells)
- William Eythe as Ben Phelps
- Walter Brennan as Jesse Rogers
- Constance Bennett as Zenia Lascalles
- Dorothy Gish as Mrs. Rogers
- Barbara Whiting as Susanna Rogers
- Larry Stevens as Richard Lewis Esq.
- Kathleen Howard as Deborah
- Buddy Swan as Dudley Rogers
- Charles Dingle as J.P. Snodgrass
- Avon Long as Specialty Dancer ("Cindarella Sue")
- Gavin Gordon as Mr. Trowbridge, Railway president (uncredited)
- Reginald Sheffield as President Ulysses S. Grant (uncredited)

== Awards ==
The movie was nominated twice at the 19th Academy Awards. One of those nominations was for Best Original Song for the song All Through the Day, written by Jerome Kern and Oscar Hammerstein II. In Kern's case, the nomination was posthumous, as he had died on 11 November 1945.

== Songs ==
- "The Right Romance" (music by Jerome Kern, lyrics by Jack Yellen)
- "Up with the Lark" (music by Kern, lyrics by Leo Robin)
- "All Through the Day" (music by Kern, lyrics by Oscar Hammerstein II)
- "In Love in Vain" (by Kern and Robin)
- "Cinderella Sue" (by Kern and Yip Harburg)
- "Two Hearts Are Better Than One" (by Kern and Johnny Mercer) was cut from the film.
