= Bill (song) =

Song
- Published: 1927 by T.B. Harms & Co.
- Composer: Jerome Kern
- Lyricists: P. G. Wodehouse and Oscar Hammerstein II

"Bill" is a song heard in Act II of Kern and Hammerstein's classic 1927 musical, Show Boat. The song was written by Kern and P. G. Wodehouse for their 1917 musical Oh, Lady! Lady!! for Vivienne Segal to perform, but it was withdrawn because it was considered too melancholy for that show. When Kern and Hammerstein were at work on a serious and somewhat tragic production of Show Boat, however, they decided that the song would be perfect for a nightclub scene in that show. Hammerstein revised Wodehouse's original lyrics somewhat (although he would always give full credit to Wodehouse for the song and take none for himself), and the song was given to real-life nightclub singer Helen Morgan to sing as she portrayed the mulatto Julie in that version of Show Boat.

The song is rendered only once in the show and is highly emotional, with the singer supposedly on the verge of tears. It is sung in an audition scene portrayed in Act II. At the Trocadero, a local Chicago night club, Julie LaVerne, the former leading lady of the show boat, is the featured singer. Julie, who is of mixed blood, has been permanently abandoned by her white husband, Steve Baker, years after the two were forced to leave the show boat because of their interracial (and therefore illegal) marriage. Despondent, Julie has taken to drink and is quickly becoming an alcoholic. At the urging of Jim Green, the nightclub manager, Julie rehearses the song "Bill", which is a woman's confession of deep love for a less-than-perfect man named Bill, and it is clear that the emotion that the singer puts into the song comes from the fact that she is really thinking about her husband as she sings.

"Bill" became one of Helen Morgan's signature songs, and onstage she sang it in her trademark style, sitting atop a piano. Although the song is heard only once in Show Boat and never reprised, it became one of the musical's most famous.

On film, Helen Morgan sang "Bill" both in the prologue to the 1929 part-talkie film version of Show Boat and in the classic 1936 film version. Lena Horne was filmed singing "Bill" for the Jerome Kern biopic Till the Clouds Roll By, but the scene was eventually cut. Ava Gardner, using the dubbed-in voice of Annette Warren, was portrayed as singing the song in the 1951 Technicolor remake of Show Boat. Gardner's own voice can be heard on the soundtrack record, however.

Polly Bergen included "Bill" in her 1957 album featuring the songs of Helen Morgan, Bergen Sings Morgan. The song became a regular part of Dorothy Lamour's repertoire. Lamour frequently sang it on radio and in concert and she recorded it in 1958. Shirley Bassey recorded the song for the 1959 Studio Cast Album of "Show Boat".

== Other notable recordings ==
- Dinah Shore - recorded "Bill" in October 1946 for Columbia Records, catalog No. 37855.
- Peggy Lee - included in her album I Like Men! (1959)
- Margaret Whiting - Margaret Whiting Sings the Jerome Kern Songbook (1960)
- Dinah Washington - for her album Dinah '63 (1963).
- Kathy Kirby - included the song in her album, Kathy Kirby Sings 16 Hits from Stars and Garters (1963)
- Rebecca Trehearn - performed "Bill" in the Sheffield Theatres production (2015) and the subsequent West End Transfer

== See also ==
- Interracial marriage in the United States
- Illegal marriage
