= Make Believe (Jerome Kern song) =

1927 song by Jerome Kern for stage musical "Show Boat"

Song
- Released: 1927
- Composer: Jerome Kern
- Lyricist: Oscar Hammerstein II

"Make Believe" is a show tune from the 1927 Broadway musical Show Boat with music by Jerome Kern and lyrics by Oscar Hammerstein II.

== Background ==
In the show, it is first sung as a duet by the characters Gaylord Ravenal, a handsome riverboat gambler, and the teenage Magnolia Hawks, an aspiring performer and daughter of the show boat captain, soon after their meeting in Act I. It reveals that they are smitten with each other almost immediately upon meeting and sets the tone for the contrasts between the ideal "make believe" world of the young lovers and the harsh realities of life that they will encounter throughout the story.

In Act II, Ravenal sings it to his little daughter Kim just before he deserts her and Magnolia because of his compulsive gambling. He tells Kim to sing it whenever she is lonely and to pretend he has never been away.

The song was introduced by Norma Terris and Howard Marsh. It was not performed in the 1929 part-talkie film adaptation of Show Boat.

The first successful recording of the song was by Paul Whiteman and his Orchestra on January 27, 1928 (vocal by Bing Crosby). The song has since become a standard and been recorded by numerous musicians.

== Notable recordings ==
- Allan Jones (1941)
- Barbra Streisand recorded the song for The Third Album (1964)
- Burl Ives for the album My Gal Sal (1964)
- Elvis Presley recorded the song at his home in Bel Air (1960)
- Howard Keel for the album Close to My Heart (1990)
- Jan Clayton & Charles Fredericks - from the 1946 cast recording of the Broadway revival.
- Jo Stafford included in the album Autumn in New York (1950)
- Peggy Lee (1964)
- Robert Merrill & Patrice Munsel for the RCA album Show Boat (1956)
- Roger Whittaker for the album A Perfect Day: His Greatest Hits and More (1996)
- Steve Lawrence for the album The Steve Lawrence Sound (1960)
- Tony Bennett for the album The Silver Lining: The Songs of Jerome Kern (2015)
- Tony Martin recorded on December 21, 1946 for Mercury Records
- Young Jessie recorded on June 18, 1957 in Los Angeles for Atco Records

== Film appearances ==
For film, it was sung by Irene Dunne and Allan Jones in the 1936 version of the musical, by Tony Martin and Kathryn Grayson in the 1946 Kern biopic Till the Clouds Roll By, and by Howard Keel and Kathryn Grayson in the 1951 version of Show Boat.

In the 1951 film, instead of singing it to Kim just before he leaves, Ravenal sings it to her when he meets her for the first time after being away for several years - the exact reverse of the situation in the original show and the 1936 film version. He has finally returned and now asks her to pretend that he has never been away.
