= Jerome Kern =

American composer (1885–1945)

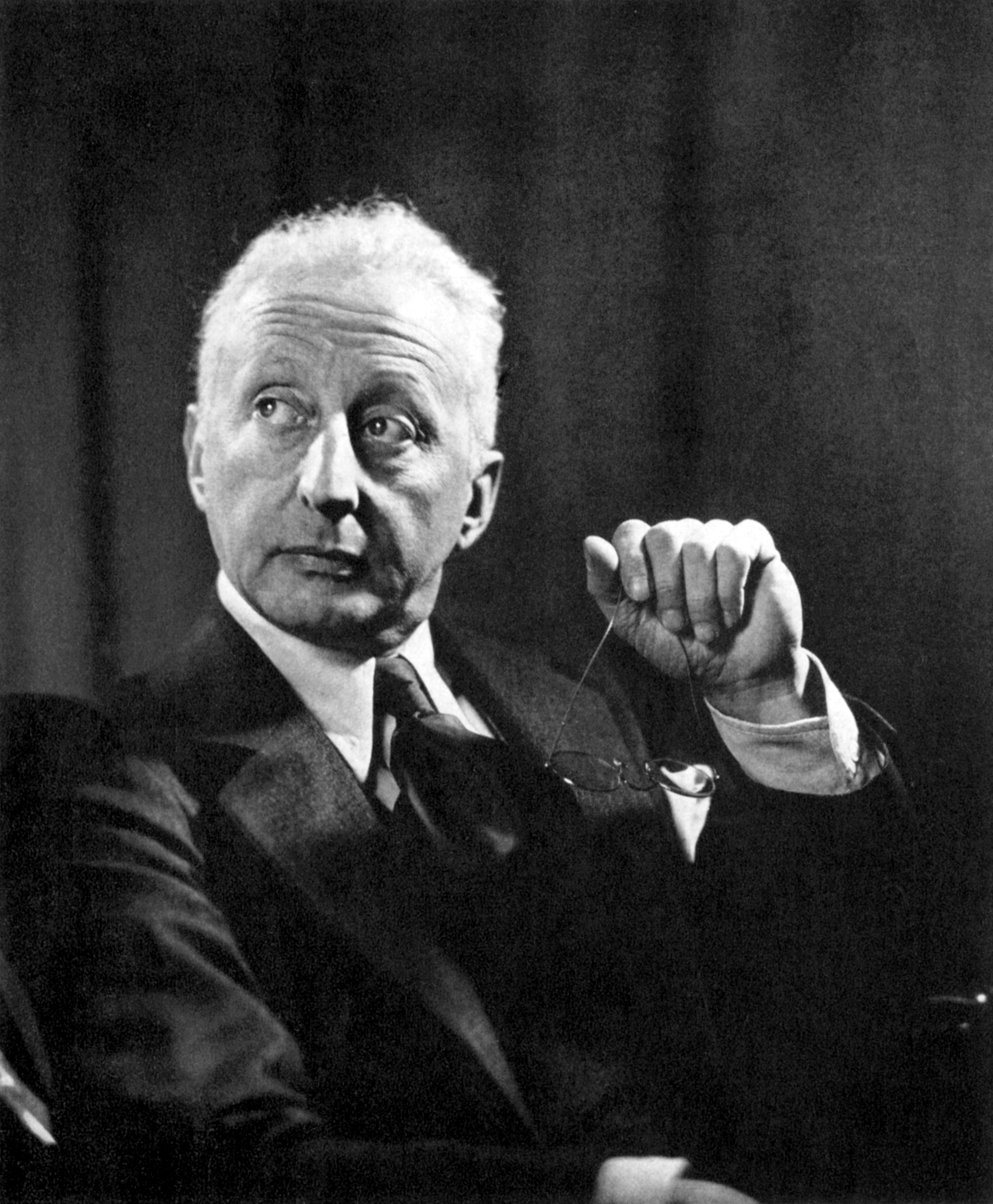
Jerome Kern in 1934

Jerome David Kern (January 27, 1885 – November 11, 1945) was an American composer of musical theatre and popular music. One of the most important American theatre composers of the early 20th century, he wrote more than 700 songs, used in over 100 stage works, including such classics as "Ol' Man River", "Can't Help Lovin' Dat Man", "A Fine Romance", "Smoke Gets in Your Eyes", "The Song Is You", "All the Things You Are", "The Way You Look Tonight" and "Long Ago (and Far Away)". He collaborated with many of the leading librettists and lyricists of his era, including George Grossmith Jr., Guy Bolton, P. G. Wodehouse, Otto Harbach, Oscar Hammerstein II, Dorothy Fields, Johnny Mercer, Ira Gershwin and Yip Harburg.

A native New Yorker, Kern created dozens of Broadway musicals and Hollywood films in a career that lasted for more than four decades. His musical innovations, such as 4/4 dance rhythms and the employment of syncopation and jazz progressions, built on, rather than rejected, earlier musical theatre tradition. He and his collaborators also employed his melodies to further the action or develop characterization to a greater extent than in the other musicals of his day, creating the model for later musicals. Although dozens of Kern's musicals and musical films were hits, only Show Boat is now regularly revived. Songs from his other shows, however, are still frequently performed and adapted. Many of Kern's songs have been adapted by jazz musicians to become standard tunes.

== Biography ==
=== Early life ===
Kern was born in New York City, on Sutton Place, in what was then the city's brewery district. His parents were Henry Kern (1842–1908), a Jewish German immigrant, and Fannie Kern née Kakeles (1852–1907), who was a Jewish American woman of Bohemian parentage. At the time of Kern's birth, his father ran a livery stable; later, he became a successful merchant. Kern grew up on East 56th Street in Manhattan, where he attended public schools. He showed an early aptitude for music and was taught to play the piano and organ by his mother, a professional player and teacher.

In 1897, the family moved to Newark, New Jersey, where Kern attended Newark High School (which became Barringer High School in 1907). He wrote songs for the school's first musical, a minstrel show, in 1901, and for an amateur musical adaptation of Uncle Tom's Cabin put on at the Newark Yacht Club in January 1902. Kern left high school before graduation in the spring of his senior year in 1902. In response, Kern's father insisted that his son work with him in business, instead of composing. Kern, however, failed miserably in one of his earliest tasks: he was supposed to purchase two pianos for the store, but instead he ordered 200. His father relented, and later in 1902, Kern became a student at the New York College of Music, studying the piano under Alexander Lambert and Paolo Gallico, and harmony under Austin Pierce. His first published composition, a piano piece, At the Casino, appeared in the same year. Between 1903 and 1905, he continued his musical training under private tutors in Heidelberg, Germany, returning to New York via London.

=== First compositions ===
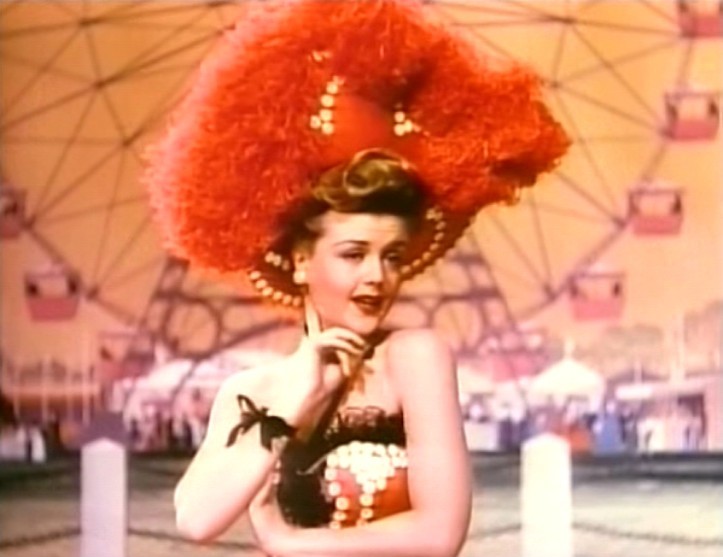
Angela Lansbury sings "How'd you like to spoon with me?" in Till the Clouds Roll By (1946)

For a time, Kern worked as a rehearsal pianist in Broadway theatres and as a song-plugger for Tin Pan Alley music publishers. While in London, he secured a contract from the American impresario Charles Frohman to provide songs for interpolation in Broadway versions of London shows. He began to provide these additions in 1904 to British scores for An English Daisy, by Seymour Hicks and Walter Slaughter, and Mr. Wix of Wickham, for which he wrote most of the songs.

In 1905, Kern contributed the song "How'd you like to spoon with me?" to Ivan Caryll's musical The Earl and the Girl when the show transferred to Chicago and New York in 1905. He also contributed to the New York production of The Catch of the Season (1905), The Little Cherub (1906) and The Orchid (1907), among other shows. From 1905 on, he spent long periods of time in London, contributing songs to West End shows like The Beauty of Bath (1906; with lyricist P. G. Wodehouse) and making valuable contacts, including George Grossmith Jr. and Seymour Hicks, who were the first to introduce Kern's songs to the London stage. In 1909 during one of his stays in England, Kern took a boat trip on the River Thames with some friends, and when the boat stopped at Walton-on-Thames, they went to an inn called the Swan for a drink. Kern was much taken with the proprietor's daughter, Eva Leale (1891–1959), who was working behind the bar. He wooed her, and they were married at the Anglican church of St. Mary's in Walton on October 25, 1910. The couple then lived at the Swan when Kern was in England.

Billie Burke, for whom Kern wrote stage and screen music

Kern is believed to have composed music for silent films as early as 1912, but the earliest documented film music which he is known to have written was for a twenty-part serial, Gloria's Romance in 1916. This was one of the first starring vehicles for Billie Burke, for whom Kern had earlier written the song "Mind the Paint", with lyrics by A. W. Pinero. The film is now considered lost, but Kern's music survives. Another score for the silent movies, Jubilo, followed in 1919. Kern was one of the founding members of ASCAP.

Kern's first complete score was Broadway's The Red Petticoat (1912), one of the first musical-comedy Westerns. The libretto was by Rida Johnson Young. By World War I, more than a hundred of Kern's songs had been used in about thirty productions, mostly Broadway adaptations of West End and European shows. Kern contributed two songs to To-Night's the Night (1914), another Rubens musical. It opened in New York and went on to become a hit in London. The best known of Kern's songs from this period is probably "They Didn't Believe Me", which was a hit in the New York version of the Paul Rubens and Sidney Jones musical, The Girl from Utah (1914), for which Kern wrote five songs. Kern's song, with four beats to a bar, departed from the customary waltz-rhythms of European influence and fitted the new American passion for modern dances such as the fox-trot. He was also able to use elements of American styles, such as ragtime, as well as syncopation, in his lively dance tunes. Theatre historian John Kenrick writes that the song put Kern in great demand on Broadway and established a pattern for musical comedy love songs that lasted through the 1960s.

In May 1915, Kern was due to sail with Charles Frohman from New York to London on board the RMS Lusitania, but Kern missed the boat, having overslept after staying up late playing poker. Frohman died in the sinking of the ship.

=== Princess Theatre musicals ===
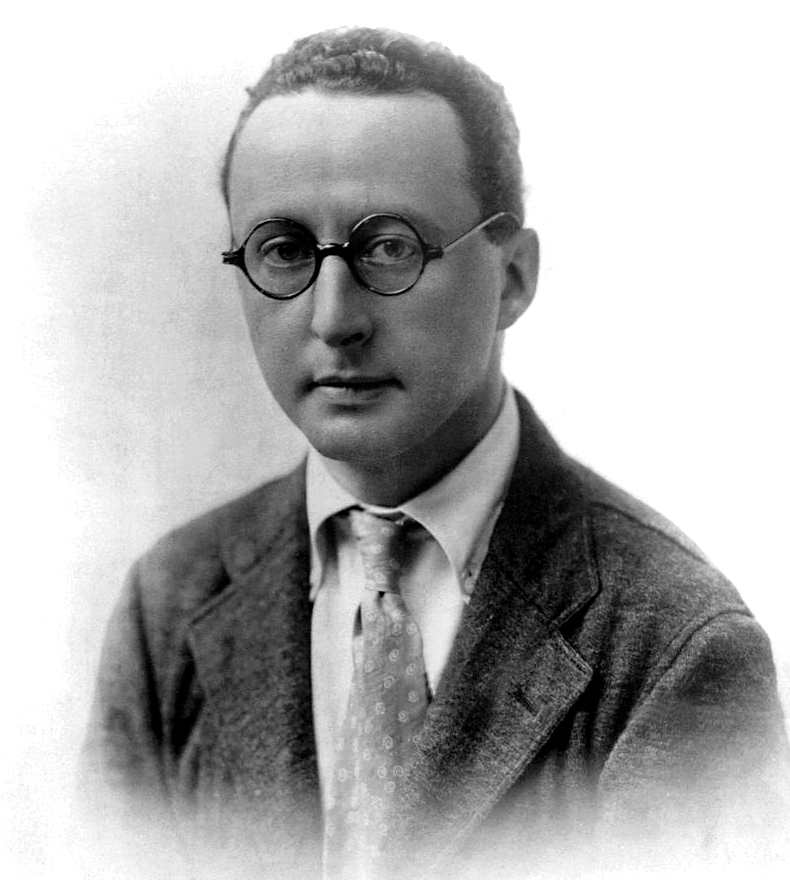
Jerome Kern in 1918

Kern composed 16 Broadway scores between 1915 and 1920 and also contributed songs to the London hit Theodore & Co (1916; most of the songs are by the young Ivor Novello) and to revues like the Ziegfeld Follies. The most notable of his scores were those for a series of shows written for the Princess Theatre, a small (299-seat) house built by Ray Comstock. Theatrical agent Elisabeth Marbury asked Kern and librettist Guy Bolton to create a series of intimate and low-budget, yet smart, musicals.

The "Princess Theatre shows" were unique on Broadway not only for their small size, but their clever, coherent plots, integrated scores and naturalistic acting, which presented "a sharp contrast to the large-scale Ruritanian operettas then in vogue" or the star-studded revues and extravaganzas of producers like Florenz Ziegfeld. Earlier musical comedy had often been thinly plotted, gaudy pieces, marked by the insertion of songs into their scores with little regard to the plot. But Kern and Bolton followed the examples of Gilbert and Sullivan and French opéra bouffe in integrating song and story. "These shows built and polished the mold from which almost all later major musical comedies evolved. ... The characters and situations were, within the limitations of musical comedy license, believable and the humor came from the situations or the nature of the characters. Kern's exquisitely flowing melodies were employed to further the action or develop characterization." The shows featured modern American settings and simple scene changes to suit the small theatre.

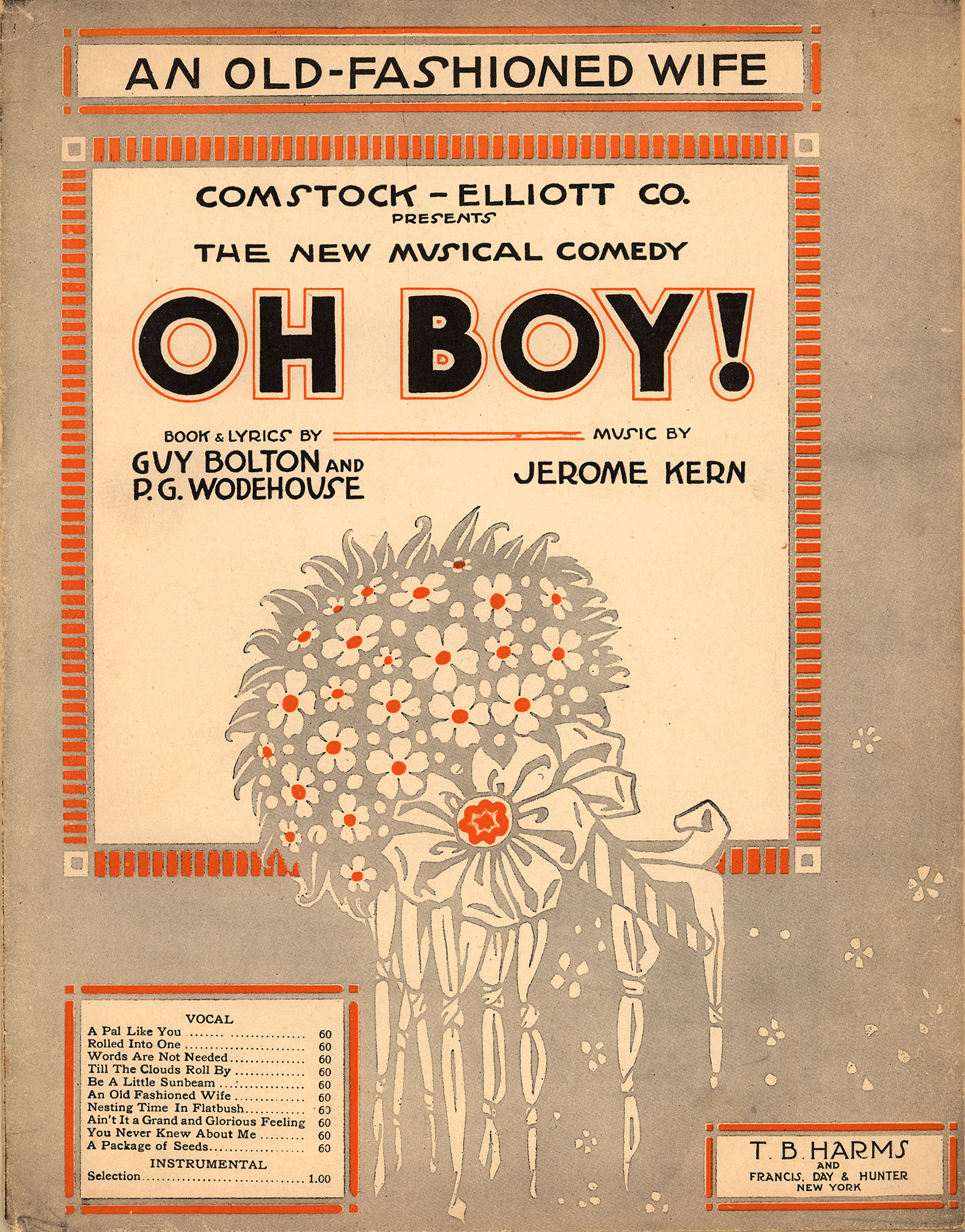
Sheet music from Oh Boy!

The team's first Princess Theatre show was an adaptation of Paul Rubens' 1905 London show, Mr. Popple (of Ippleton), called Nobody Home (1915). The piece ran for 135 performances and was a modest financial success. However, it did little to fulfill the new team's mission to innovate, except that Kern's song, "The Magic Melody", was the first Broadway showtune with a basic jazz progression. Kern and Bolton next created an original piece, Very Good Eddie, which was a surprise hit, running for 341 performances, with additional touring productions that went on into the 1918-19 season. The British humorist, lyricist and librettist P. G. Wodehouse joined the Princess team in 1917, adding his skill as a lyricist to the succeeding shows. Oh, Boy! (1917) ran for an extraordinary 463 performances. Other shows written for the theatre were Have a Heart (1917), Leave It to Jane (1917) and Oh, Lady! Lady!! (1918). The first opened at another theatre before Very Good Eddie closed. The second played elsewhere during the long run of Oh Boy! An anonymous admirer wrote a verse in their praise that begins:

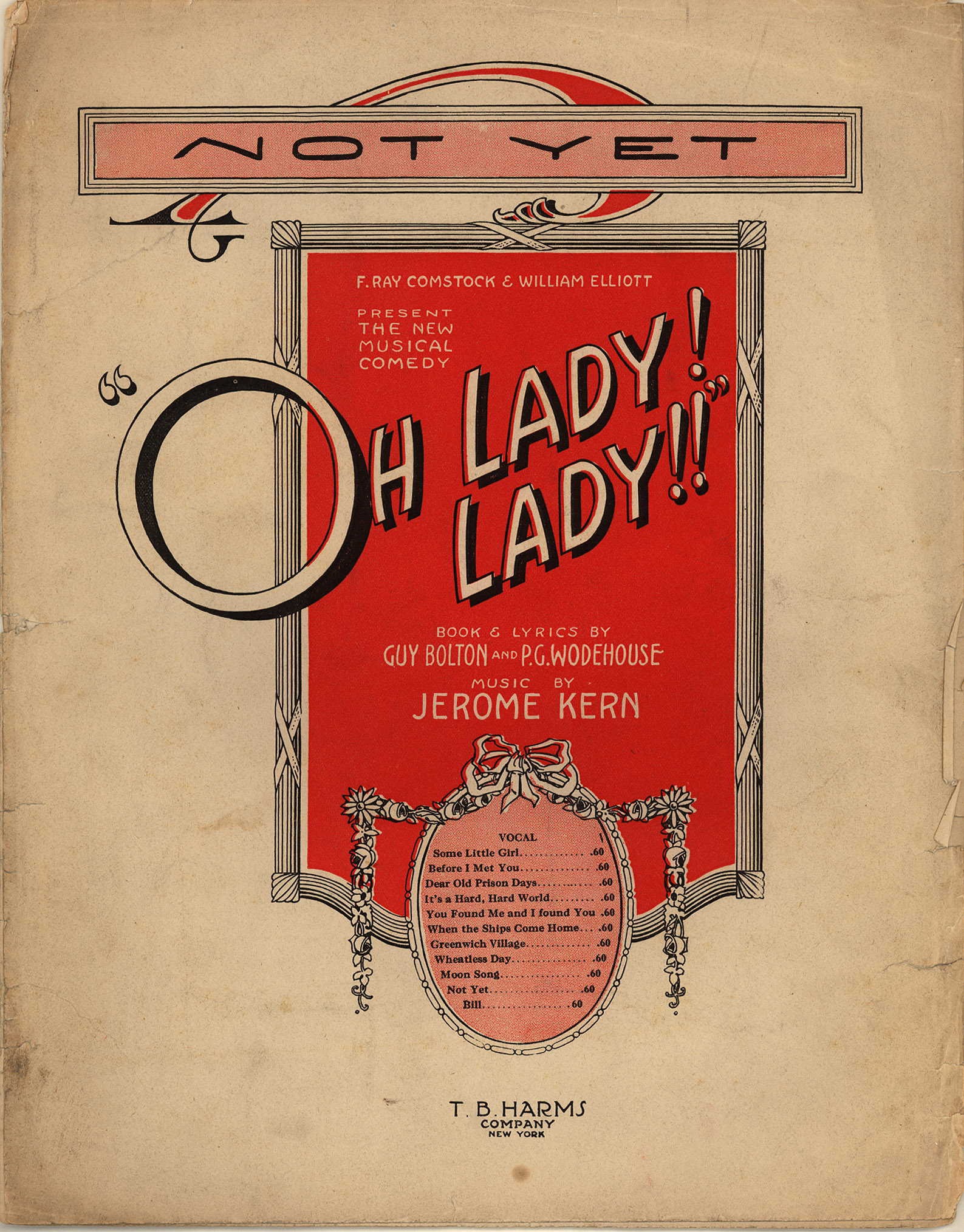
Sheet music from Oh, Lady! Lady!!

This is the trio of musical fame,
Bolton and Wodehouse and Kern.
Better than anyone else you can name
Bolton and Wodehouse and Kern.

In February 1918, Dorothy Parker wrote in Vanity Fair:

Well, Bolton and Wodehouse and Kern have done it again. Every time these three gather together, the Princess Theatre is sold out for months in advance. You can get a seat for Oh, Lady! Lady!! somewhere around the middle of August for just about the price of one on the stock exchange. If you ask me, I will look you fearlessly in the eye and tell you in low, throbbing tones that it has it over any other musical comedy in town. But then Bolton and Wodehouse and Kern are my favorite indoor sport. I like the way they go about a musical comedy. ... I like the way the action slides casually into the songs. ... I like the deft rhyming of the song that is always sung in the last act by two comedians and a comedienne. And oh, how I do like Jerome Kern's music. And all these things are even more so in Oh, Lady! Lady!! than they were in Oh, Boy!

Oh, Lady! Lady!! was the last successful "Princess Theatre show". Kern and Wodehouse disagreed over money, and the composer decided to move on to other projects. Kern's importance to the partnership was illustrated by the fate of the last musical of the series, Oh, My Dear! (1918), to which he contributed only one song: "Go, Little Boat". The rest of the show was composed by Louis Hirsch and ran for 189 performances: "Despite a respectable run, everyone realized there was little point in continuing the series without Kern."

=== Early 1920s ===
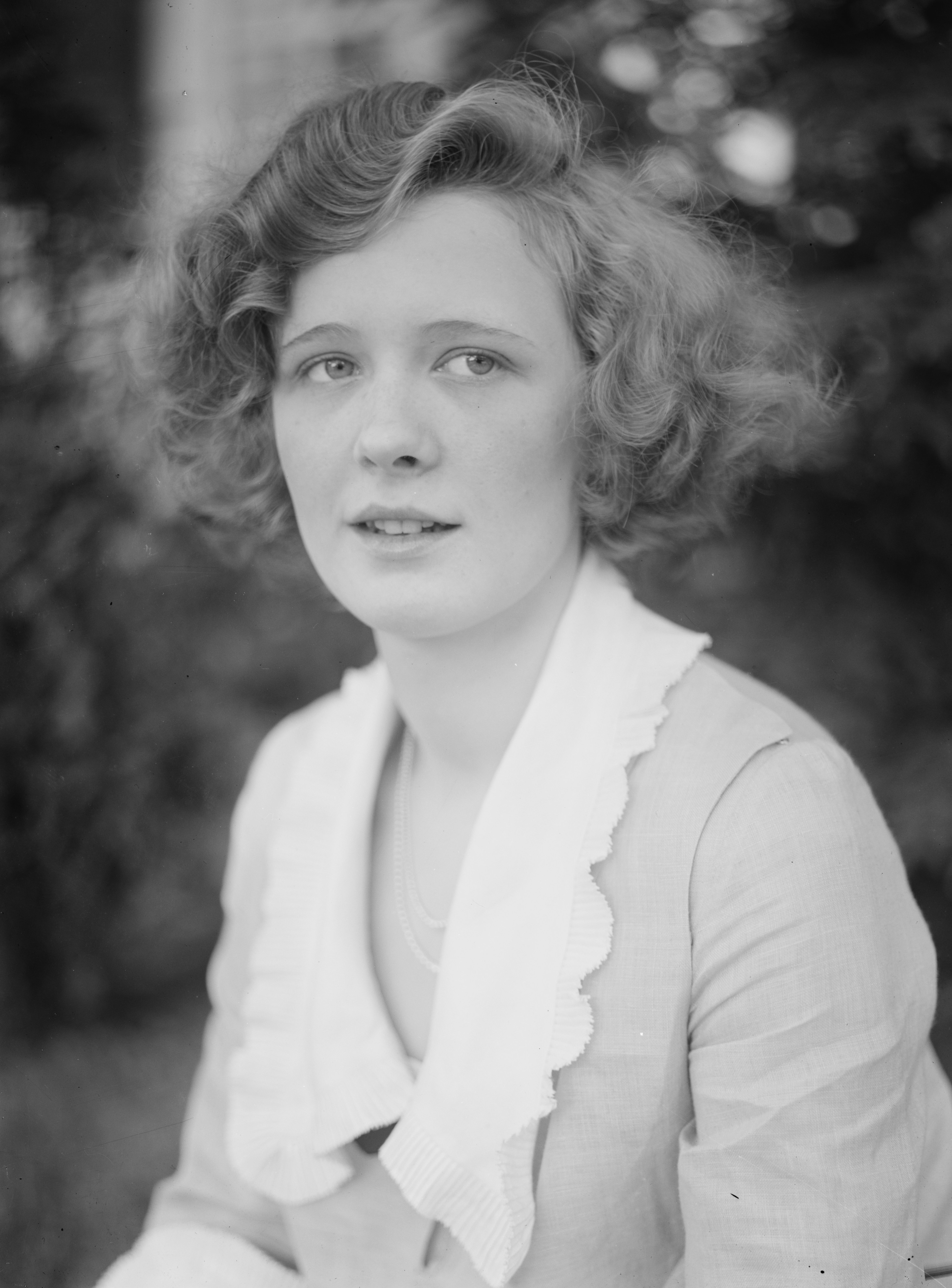
Marilyn Miller, the star of Sally

The 1920s were an extremely productive period in American musical theatre, and Kern created at least one show every year for the entire decade. His first show of 1920 was The Night Boat, with book and lyrics by Anne Caldwell, which ran for more than 300 performances in New York and for three seasons on tour. Later in the same year, Kern wrote the score for Sally, with a book by Bolton and lyrics by Otto Harbach. This show, staged by Florenz Ziegfeld, ran for 570 performances, one of the longest runs of any Broadway show in the decade, and popularized the song "Look for the Silver Lining" (which had been written for an earlier show), performed by the rising star Marilyn Miller. It also had a long run in London in 1921, produced by George Grossmith Jr. Kern's next shows were Good Morning, Dearie (1921, with Caldwell) which ran for 347 performances; followed in 1922 by a West End success, The Cabaret Girl in collaboration with Grossmith and Wodehouse; another modest success by the same team, The Beauty Prize (1923); and a Broadway flop, The Bunch and Judy, remembered, if at all, as the first time Kern and Fred Astaire worked together.

Stepping Stones (1923, with Caldwell) was a success, and in 1924 the Princess Theatre team of Bolton, Wodehouse and Kern reunited to write Sitting Pretty, but it did not recapture the popularity of the earlier collaborations. Its relative failure may have been partly due to Kern's growing aversion to having individual songs from his shows performed out of context on radio, in cabaret, or on record, although his chief objection was to jazz interpretations of his songs. He called himself a "musical clothier – nothing more or less," and said, "I write music to both the situations and the lyrics in plays." When Sitting Pretty was produced, he forbade any broadcasting or recording of individual numbers from the show, which limited their chance to gain popularity.

1925 was a major turning point in Kern's career when he met Oscar Hammerstein II, with whom he would entertain a lifelong friendship and collaboration. As a young man, Kern had been an easy companion with great charm and humor, but he became less outgoing in his middle years, sometimes difficult to work with: he once introduced himself to a producer by saying, "I hear you're a son of a bitch. So am I." He rarely collaborated with any one lyricist for long. With Hammerstein, however, he remained on close terms for the rest of his life. Their first show, written together with Harbach, was Sunny, which featured the song "Who (Stole My Heart Away)?" Marilyn Miller played the title role, as she had in Sally. The show ran for 517 performances on Broadway, and the following year ran for 363 performances in the West End, starring Binnie Hale and Jack Buchanan.

=== Show Boat ===
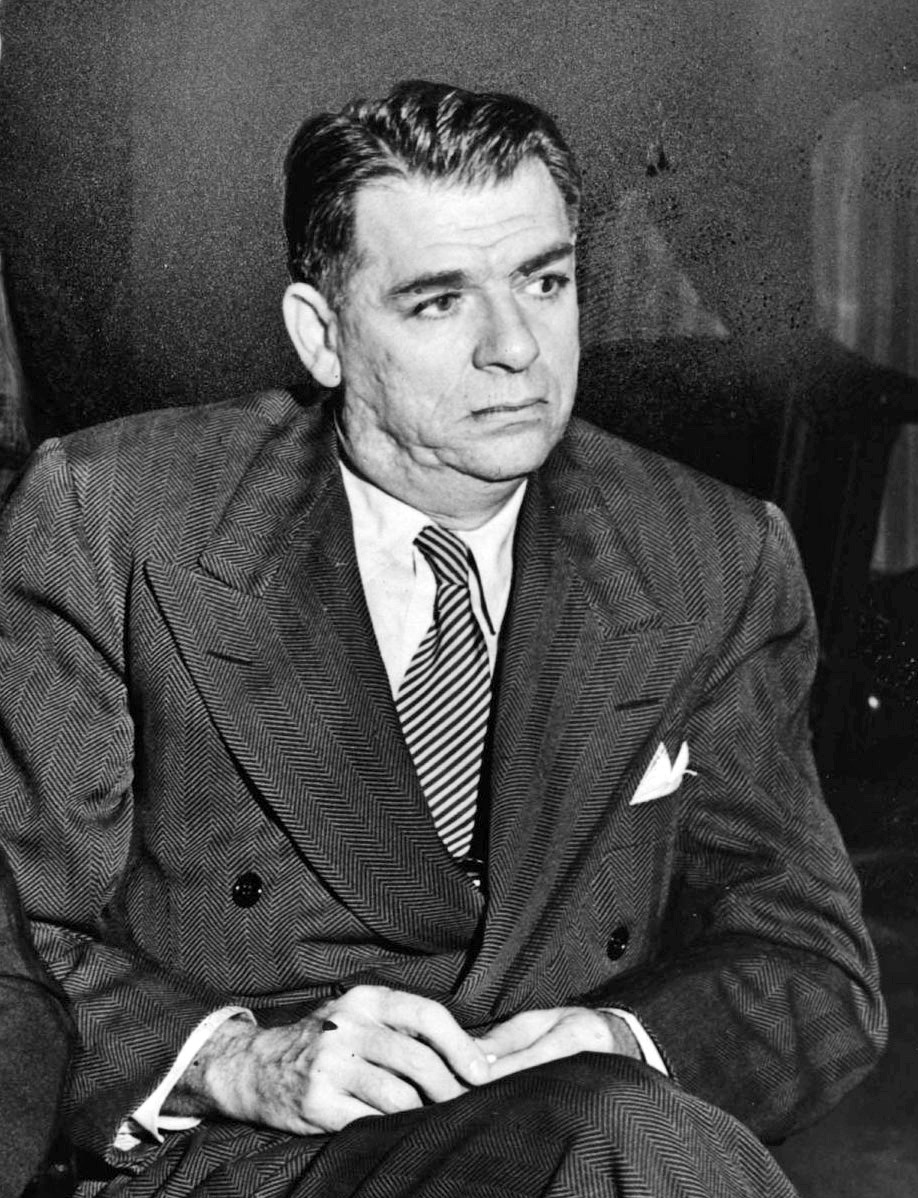
Oscar Hammerstein II, one of Kern's chief collaborators

Because of the strong success of Sally and Sunny and consistent good results with his other shows, Ziegfeld was willing to gamble on Kern's next project in 1927. Kern had been impressed by Edna Ferber's novel Show Boat and wished to present a musical stage version. He persuaded Hammerstein to adapt it and Ziegfeld to produce it. The story, dealing with racism, marital strife and alcoholism, was unheard of in the escapist world of musical comedy. Despite his doubts, Ziegfeld spared no expense in staging the piece to give it its full epic grandeur. According to the theatre historian John Kenrick: "After the opening night audience filed out of the Ziegfeld Theatre in near silence, Ziegfeld thought his worst fears had been confirmed. He was pleasantly surprised when the next morning brought ecstatic reviews and long lines at the box office. In fact, Show Boat proved to be the most lasting accomplishment of Ziegfeld's career – the only one of his shows that is regularly performed today." The score is, arguably, Kern's greatest and includes the well-known songs "Ol' Man River" and "Can't Help Lovin' Dat Man" as well as "Make Believe", "You Are Love", "Life Upon the Wicked Stage", "Why Do I Love You", all with lyrics by Hammerstein, and "Bill", originally written for Oh, Lady! Lady!, with lyrics by P. G. Wodehouse. The show ran for 572 performances on Broadway and was also a success in London. Although Ferber's novel was filmed unsuccessfully as a part-talkie in 1929 (using some songs from the Kern score), the musical itself was filmed twice, in 1936, and, with Technicolor, in 1951. In 1989, a stage version of the musical was presented on television for the first time, in a production from the Paper Mill Playhouse telecast by PBS on Great Performances.

While most Kern musicals have largely been forgotten, except for their songs, Show Boat remains well-remembered and frequently seen. It is a staple of stock productions and has been revived numerous times on Broadway and in London. A 1946 revival integrated choreography into the show, in the manner of a Rodgers and Hammerstein production, as did the 1994 Harold Prince–Susan Stroman revival, which was nominated for ten Tony Awards, winning five, including best revival. It was the first musical to enter a major opera company's repertory (New York City Opera, 1954), and the rediscovery of the 1927 score with Robert Russell Bennett's original orchestrations led to a large-scale EMI recording in 1987 and several opera-house productions. In 1941, the conductor Artur Rodziński wished to commission a symphonic suite from the score, but Kern considered himself a songwriter and not a symphonist. He never orchestrated his own scores, leaving that to musical assistants, principally Frank Saddler (until 1921) and Robert Russell Bennett (from 1923). In response to the commission, Kern oversaw an arrangement by Charles Miller and Emil Gerstenberger of numbers from the show into the orchestral work Scenario for Orchestra: Themes from Show Boat, premiered in 1941 by the Cleveland Orchestra conducted by Rodziński.

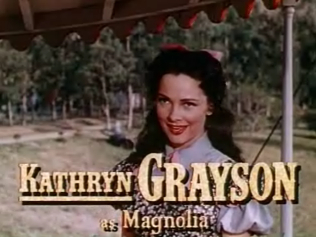
1951 film version of Kern and Hammerstein's Show Boat

Kern's last Broadway show in the 1920s was Sweet Adeline (1929), with a libretto by Hammerstein. It was a period piece, set in the Gay 90s, about a girl from Hoboken, New Jersey (near Kern's childhood home), who becomes a Broadway star. Opening just before the stock market crash, it received rave reviews, but the elaborate, old-fashioned piece was a step back from the innovations in Show Boat, or even the Princess Theatre shows. In January 1929, at the height of the Jazz Age, and with Show Boat still playing on Broadway, Kern made news on both sides of the Atlantic for reasons wholly unconnected with music. He sold at auction, at New York's Anderson Galleries, the collection of English and American literature that he had been building up for more than a decade. The collection, rich in inscribed first editions and manuscript material of eighteenth and nineteenth century authors, sold for a total of $1,729,462.50 (equivalent to $32,427,413 in 2025) – a record for a single-owner sale that stood for over fifty years. Among the books he sold were first or early editions of poems by Robert Burns and Percy Bysshe Shelley, and works by Jonathan Swift, Henry Fielding and Charles Dickens, as well as manuscripts by Alexander Pope, John Keats, Shelley, Lord Byron, Thomas Hardy and others.

=== First films and later shows ===
In 1929, Kern made his first trip to Hollywood to supervise the 1929 film version of Sally, one of the first "all-talking" Technicolor films. The following year, he was there a second time to work on Men of the Sky, released in 1931 without his songs, and a 1930 film version of Sunny. There was a public reaction against the early glut of film musicals after the advent of film sound; Hollywood released more than 100 musical films in 1930, but only 14 in 1931. Warner Bros. bought out Kern's contract, and he returned to the stage. He collaborated with Harbach on the Broadway musical The Cat and the Fiddle (1931), about a composer and an opera singer, featuring the songs "She Didn't Say Yes" and "The Night Was Made for Love". It ran for 395 performances, a remarkable success for the Depression years, and transferred to London the following year. It was filmed in 1934 with Jeanette MacDonald.

Music in the Air (1932) was another Kern-Hammerstein collaboration and another show-biz plot, best remembered today for "The Song Is You" and "I've Told Ev'ry Little Star". It was "undoubtedly an operetta", set in the German countryside, but without the Ruritanian trimmings of the operettas of Kern's youth. Roberta (1933) by Kern and Harbach included the songs "Smoke Gets in Your Eyes", "Let's Begin" and "Yesterdays" and featured, among others, Bob Hope, Fred MacMurray, George Murphy and Sydney Greenstreet all in the early stages of their careers. Kern's Three Sisters (1934) was his last West End show, with a libretto by Hammerstein. The musical, depicting horse-racing, the circus, and class distinctions, was a failure, running for only two months. Its song "I Won't Dance" was used in the film Roberta. Some British critics objected to American writers essaying a British story; James Agate, doyen of London theatre critics of the day, dismissed it as "American inanity," though both Kern and Hammerstein were strong and knowledgeable Anglophiles. Kern's last Broadway show (other than revivals) was Very Warm for May (1939), another show-biz story and another disappointment, although the score included the Kern and Hammerstein classic "All The Things You Are".

=== Kern in Hollywood ===
In 1935, when musical films had become popular once again, thanks to Busby Berkeley, Kern returned to Hollywood, where he composed the scores to a dozen more films, although he also continued working on Broadway productions. He settled permanently in Hollywood in 1937. After suffering a heart attack in 1939, he was told by his doctors to concentrate on film scores, a less stressful task, as Hollywood songwriters were not as deeply involved with the production of their works as Broadway songwriters. This second phase of Kern's Hollywood career had considerably greater artistic and commercial success than the first. With Hammerstein, he wrote songs for the film versions of his recent Broadway shows Music in the Air (1934), which starred Gloria Swanson in a rare singing role, and Sweet Adeline (1935). With Dorothy Fields, he composed the new music for I Dream Too Much (1935), a musical melodrama about the opera world, starring the Metropolitan Opera diva Lily Pons. Kern and Fields interspersed the opera numbers with their songs, including "the swinging 'I Got Love,' the lullaby 'The Jockey on the Carousel,' and the entrancing title song." Also with Fields, he wrote two new songs, "I Won't Dance" and "Lovely to Look At", for the Fred Astaire and Ginger Rogers film version of Roberta (1935), which was a hit. The show also included the song "I'll Be Hard to Handle". This was given a 1952 remake called Lovely to Look At.

Their next film, Swing Time (1936) included the song "The Way You Look Tonight", which won the Academy Award in 1936 for the best song. Other songs in Swing Time include "A Fine Romance", "Pick Yourself Up" and "Never Gonna Dance". The Oxford Companion to the American Musical calls Swing Time "a strong candidate for the best of the Fred Astaire and Ginger Rogers musicals" and says that, although the screenplay is contrived, it "left plenty of room for dance and all of it was superb. ... Although the movie is remembered as one of the great dance musicals, it also boasts one of the best film scores of the 1930s." For the 1936 film version of Show Boat, Kern and Hammerstein wrote three new songs, including "I Have The Room Above Her" and "Ah Still Suits Me". High, Wide, and Handsome (1937) was intentionally similar in plot and style to Show Boat, but it was a box-office failure. Kern songs were also used in the Cary Grant film, When You're in Love (1937), and the first Abbott and Costello feature, One Night in the Tropics (1940). In 1940, Hammerstein wrote the lyric "The Last Time I Saw Paris", in homage to the French capital, recently occupied by the Germans. Kern set it, the only time he set a pre-written lyric, and his only hit song not written as part of a musical. Originally a hit for Tony Martin and later for Noël Coward, the song was used in the film Lady Be Good (1941) and won Kern another Oscar for best song. Kern's second and last symphonic work was his Mark Twain Suite (1942).

In his last Hollywood musicals, Kern worked with several new and distinguished partners. With Johnny Mercer for You Were Never Lovelier (1942), he contributed "a set of memorable songs to entertain audiences until the plot came to its inevitable conclusion". The film starred Astaire and Rita Hayworth and included the song "I'm Old Fashioned". Kern's next collaboration was with Ira Gershwin on Cover Girl starring Hayworth and Gene Kelly (1944) for which Kern composed "Sure Thing","Put Me to the Test," "Make Way for Tomorrow" (lyric by E. Y. Harburg), and the hit ballad "Long Ago (and Far Away)". For the Deanna Durbin Western musical, Can't Help Singing (1944), with lyrics by Harburg, Kern "provided the best original score of Durbin's career, mixing operetta and Broadway sounds in such songs as 'Any Moment Now,' 'Swing Your Partner,' 'More and More,' and the lilting title number." "More and More" was nominated for an Oscar.

Kern composed his last film score, Centennial Summer (1946) in which "the songs were as resplendent as the story and characters were mediocre. ... Oscar Hammerstein, Leo Robin, and E. Y. Harburg contributed lyrics for Kern's lovely music, resulting in the soulful ballad 'All Through the Day,' the rustic 'Cinderella Sue,' the cheerful 'Up With the Lark,' and the torchy 'In Love in Vain.'" "All Through the Day" was another Oscar nominee. The music of Kern's last two films is notable in the way it developed from his earlier work. Some of it was too advanced for the film companies; Kern's biographer, Stephen Banfield, refers to "tonal experimentation ... outlandish enharmonics" that the studios insisted on cutting. At the same time, in some ways his music came full circle: having in his youth helped to end the reigns of the waltz and operetta, he now composed three of his finest waltzes ("Can't Help Singing", "Californ-i-ay" and "Up With the Lark"), the last having a distinctly operetta-like character.

=== Personal life and death ===
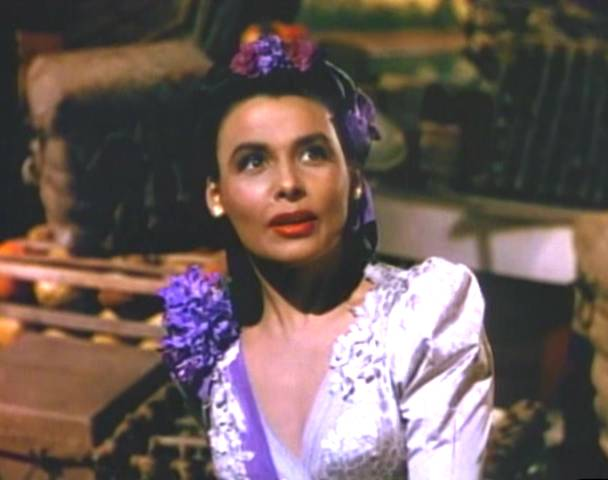
Lena Horne sings "Can't Help Lovin' Dat Man" in Till the Clouds Roll By.

Kern and his wife, Eva, often vacationed on their yacht Show Boat. He collected rare books and enjoyed betting on horses. At the time of Kern's death, Metro-Goldwyn-Mayer was filming a fictionalized version of his life, Till the Clouds Roll By, which was released in 1946 starring Robert Walker as Kern. In the film, Kern's songs are sung by Judy Garland, Kathryn Grayson, June Allyson, Lena Horne, Dinah Shore, Frank Sinatra and Angela Lansbury, among others, and Gower Champion and Cyd Charisse appear as dancers. Many of the biographical elements are fictionalized.

In the fall of 1945, Kern returned to New York City to oversee auditions for a new revival of Show Boat, and began to work on the score for what would become the musical Annie Get Your Gun, to be produced by Rodgers and Hammerstein. On November 5, 1945, at 60 years of age, he suffered a cerebral hemorrhage while walking at the corner of Park Avenue and 57th Street. Identifiable only by his ASCAP card, Kern was initially taken to the indigent ward at City Hospital, later being transferred to Doctors Hospital in Manhattan. Hammerstein was at his side when Kern's breathing stopped less than a week later, on November 11. Hammerstein hummed or sang the song "I've Told Ev'ry Little Star" from Music in the Air (a personal favorite of the composer's) into Kern's ear. Receiving no response, Hammerstein realized Kern had died. Rodgers and Hammerstein then assigned the task of writing the score for Annie Get Your Gun to the veteran Broadway composer Irving Berlin.

Kern is interred at Ferncliff Cemetery in Westchester County, New York. His daughter, Elizabeth "Betty" Jane Kern (1918–1996) married Artie Shaw in 1942 and later Jack Cummings. Kern's wife eventually remarried, to a singer named George Byron.

== Accolades ==
Jerome Kern was nominated eight times for an Academy Award and won twice. Seven nominations were for Best Original Song; these included a posthumous nomination in each of 1945 and 1946. One nomination was in 1945 for Best Original Music Score. Kern was not eligible for any Tony Awards, which were not created until 1947. In 1976, Very Good Eddie was nominated for a Drama Desk Award as Outstanding Revival, and the director and actors received various Tony, Drama Desk and other awards and nominations. Elisabeth Welsh was nominated for a Tony Award for her performance in Jerome Kern Goes to Hollywood in 1986, and Show Boat received Tony nominations in both 1983 and 1995, winning for best revival in 1995 (among numerous other awards and nominations), and won the Laurence Olivier Award for best revival in 2008. In 1986, Big Deal was nominated for the Tony for best musical, among other awards, and Bob Fosse won as best choreographer. In 2000, Swing!, featuring Kern's "I Won't Dance" was nominated for the Tony for Best Musical, among others. In 2002, Elaine Stritch at Liberty, featuring Kern's "All in Fun", won the Tony Award for Best Special Theatrical Event. In 2004, Never Gonna Dance received two Tony nominations.

Kern was inducted into the Songwriters Hall of Fame posthumously in 1970. In 1985, the U.S. Post Office issued a postage stamp (Scott #2110, 22¢), with an illustration of Kern holding sheet music. The Grateful Dead guitarist Jerry Garcia was named after Kern by his Dixieland bandleader father.

=== Academy Award for Best Original Song ===
- 1935 – Nominated for "Lovely to Look At" (lyrics by Dorothy Fields and Jimmy McHugh) from Roberta
- 1936 – Won for "The Way You Look Tonight" (lyrics by Dorothy Fields) from Swing Time
- 1941 – Won for "The Last Time I Saw Paris" (lyrics by Oscar Hammerstein II) from Lady Be Good
- 1942 – Nominated for "Dearly Beloved" (lyrics by Johnny Mercer) from You Were Never Lovelier.
- 1944 – Nominated for "Long Ago (and Far Away)" (lyrics by Ira Gershwin) from Cover Girl
- 1945 – Posthumously nominated for "More and More" (lyrics by E. Y. Harburg) from Can't Help Singing
- 1946 – Posthumously nominated for "All Through the Day" (lyrics by Oscar Hammerstein II) from Centennial Summer.

=== Academy Award for Best Original Music Score ===
- 1945 – Posthumously nominated for Can't Help Singing (with H. J. Salter).

== Selected works ==
Note: All shows listed are musical comedies for which Kern was the sole composer unless otherwise specified.

=== 1904–1911 ===
During his first phase of work (1904–1911), Kern wrote songs for 22 Broadway productions, including songs interpolated into British musicals or featured in revues (sometimes writing lyrics as well as music), and he occasionally co-wrote musicals with one or two other composers. During visits to London beginning in 1905, he also composed songs that were first performed in several London shows. The following are some of the most notable such shows from this period:

- Mr. Wix of Wickham (1904) – contributed most of the songs for this musical's New York production
- The Catch of the Season (1905) – contributed to this Seymour Hicks musical's New York production
- The Earl and the Girl (1905) – contributed music and lyrics to this Hicks and Ivan Caryll musical's American productions
- The Little Cherub (1906) – contributed to this Caryll and Owen Hall musical's New York production
- The Rich Mr. Hoggenheimer (1906) – contributed eight songs
- The Beauty of Bath (1906) – contributed to the original London production of this Hicks musical, with lyricist P. G. Wodehouse
- The Orchid (1907) – contributed to this Caryll and Lionel Monckton musical's New York production
- The Girls of Gottenberg (1908) – contributed "I Can't Say That You're The Only One" to this Caryll and Monckton musical's New York production
- Fluffy Ruffles (1908) – co-composed eight out of ten songs
- The Dollar Princess (1909) – contributed songs for American production
- Our Miss Gibbs (1910) – contributed four songs and some lyrics to this Caryll and Monckton musical's New York production
- La Belle Paree (1911) – revue; co-composed seven songs; the Broadway debut of Al Jolson

=== 1912–1924 ===
From 1912 to 1924, the more-experienced Kern began to work on dramatically concerned shows, including incidental music for plays, and, for the first time since his college show Uncle Tom's Cabin, he wrote musicals as the sole composer. His regular lyricist collaborators for his more than 30 shows during this period were Bolton, Wodehouse, Caldwell, Harry B. Smith and Howard Dietz. Some of his most notable shows during this very productive period were as follows:

- The "Mind-the-Paint" Girl (1912 play; starring Billie Burke) – incidental music
- The Red Petticoat (1912) – Kern's first complete score
- To-Night's the Night (1914) – contributed two songs to this Rubens musical
- The Girl from Utah (1914) – added five songs to the American production of this Rubens musical
- Nobody Home (1915) – the first "Princess Theatre show"
- Very Good Eddie (1915; revived in 1975)
- Ziegfeld Follies of 1916 (1916; a revue; the first of many) – contributed four songs
- Theodore & Co (1916) – contributed four songs to young Ivor Novello's London hit.
- Miss 1917 - the musical comedy
- Miss Springtime (1917) – contributed two songs to this Emmerich Kalman success
- Have a Heart (1917) – composer; contributed some lyrics
- Love O' Mike (1917)
- Oh, Boy! (1917) – the most successful Princess Theatre show
- Ziegfeld Follies of 1917 (1917) – contributed "Because You Are Just You (Just Because You're You)"
- Leave It to Jane (1917; revived in 1958 off-Broadway)
- Oh, Lady! Lady!! (1918) – the last Princess Theatre hit
- "Oh, My Dear" (1918) – contributed one song to this last "Princess Theatre show"
- The Night Boat (1920)
- Hitchy-Koo of 1920 (1920) – revue
- Sally (1920; revived in 1923 and 1948) – a long-running hit
- The Cabaret Girl (London 1922)
- The Bunch and Judy (1922) – Kern's first show with Fred Astaire
- Stepping Stones (1923)

=== 1925–1939 ===
During the last phase of his theatrical composing career, Kern continued to work with his previous collaborators but also met Oscar Hammerstein II and Otto Harbach, with whom Kern wrote his most lasting, memorable, and well-known works. The most successful of these are as follows:

- Sunny (1925) – follow-up to Sally and almost as big a hit; first collaboration with Hammerstein and Harbach
- Criss Cross (1926) – with Harbach
- Show Boat (1927; revived frequently) – with Hammerstein
- Blue Eyes (1928; London)
- Sweet Adeline (1929) – with Hammerstein
- The Cat and the Fiddle (1931) – Kern collaborated with Harbach the music, book and lyrics
- Music in the Air (1932; revived in 1951) – composer and co-director with Hammerstein
- Roberta (1933) – with Harbach (remade as Lovely to Look At (1952))
- Three Sisters (1934; London)
- Mamba's Daughters (1939; revived in 1940) – play – featured songwriter
- Very Warm for May (1939) – with Hammerstein; Kern's last stage musical, and a failure

=== Posthumous ===
In addition to revivals of his most popular shows, Kern's music has been posthumously featured in a variety of revues, musicals and concerts on and off Broadway.

- Jerome Kern Goes to Hollywood (1986) – Broadway revue consisting solely of Kern songs with lyrics by twelve different writers
- Big Deal (1986) – a Bob Fosse dance revue; includes "Pick Yourself Up"
- Something Wonderful (1995) – concert celebrating Oscar Hammerstein II's 100th birthday – featured composer
- Dream (1997) – revue; includes "You Were Never Lovelier", "I'm Old Fashioned", and "Dearly Beloved"
- Swing! (1999) – dance revue; includes "I Won't Dance"
- Elaine Stritch at Liberty (2002) – one-woman show; included "All In Fun"
- Never Gonna Dance (2003) – musical consisting solely of songs composed by Kern, with lyrics by nine different writers
- Jerome Kern: All the Things You Are (2008) – KT Sullivan's revue biography of Kern featuring Kern's songs
- Come Fly Away (2010) – a Twyla Tharp dance revue; includes "Pick Yourself Up"

== Kern's songs ==
Among the more than 700 songs by Kern are such classics as "They Didn't Believe Me" (1914), "Look for the Silver Lining" (1920), "Ol' Man River", "Can't Help Lovin' Dat Man", "Make Believe", "You Are Love" and "Bill" (all from Show Boat, 1927), "The Song Is You" (1932), "Smoke Gets in Your Eyes", "Yesterdays" and "Let's Begin" (all from Roberta, 1933), "I Won't Dance" (1935), "A Fine Romance" and the Academy Award-winning "The Way You Look Tonight" (both from Swing Time, 1936), "All the Things You Are" (1939) and "I'm Old Fashioned" (1942). Another Oscar winner was "The Last Time I Saw Paris". One of Kern's last hits was "Long Ago (and Far Away)" (1944).
