= Annette Warren =

American vocalist and jazz stylist (born 1922)

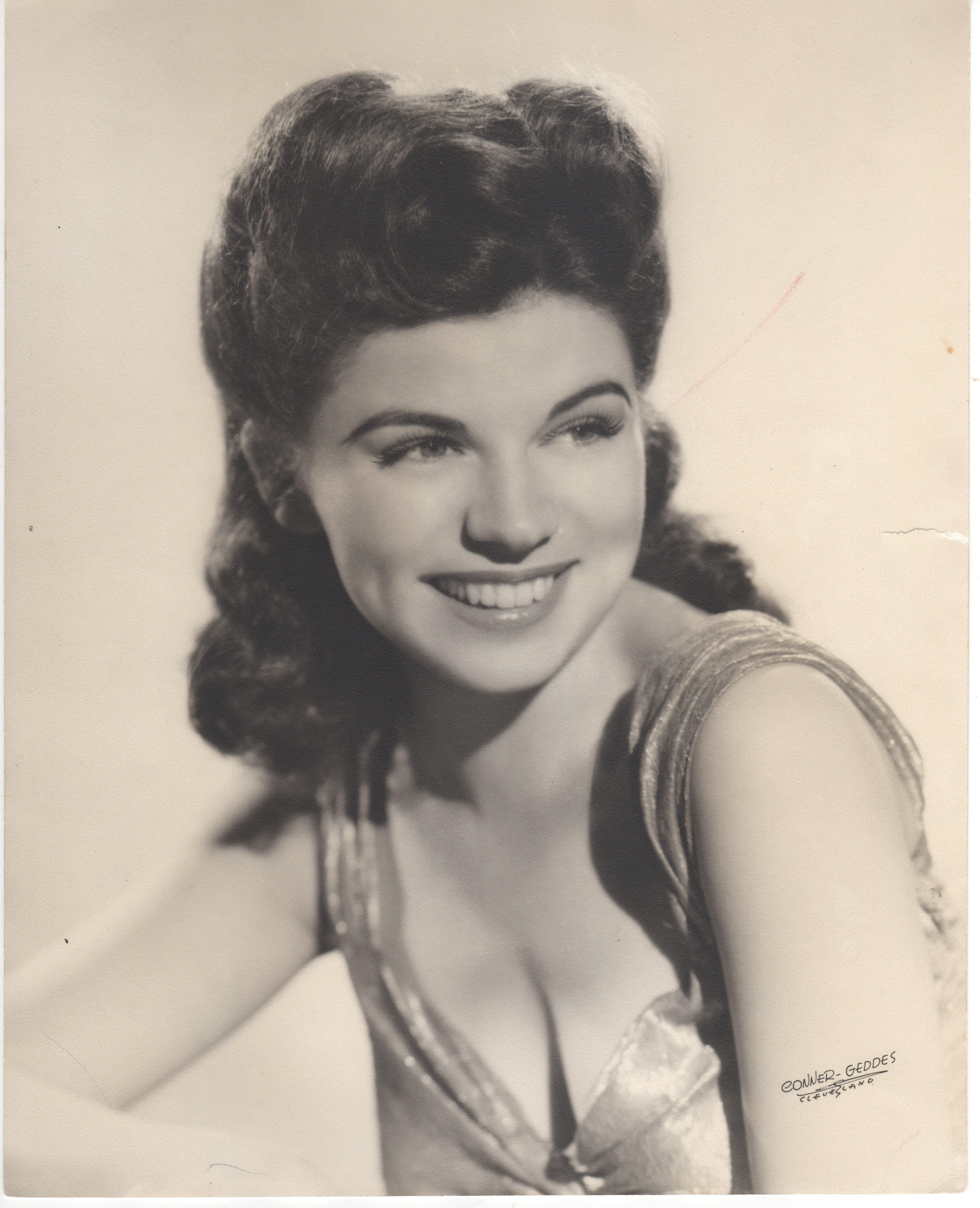
- Born: July 11, 1922 (age 104); Cleveland, Ohio, U.S.
- Occupations: Vocalist, jazz stylist
- Years active: 1947–present
- Spouse: Paul Smith (m. 1958; died 2013)
- Children: 4, including Lauri Johnson

Annette Warren (born July 11, 1922) is an American vocalist and jazz stylist who dubbed the singing voices of such stars as Lucille Ball in Sorrowful Jones (1949) and Fancy Pants (1950), and Ava Gardner in the 1951 film version of Show Boat. She was still actively performing in 2017 at the age of 95.

== Early life ==
Warren was born in Cleveland, Ohio on July 11, 1922. She was discovered in 1945 by vocal coach and arranger Phil Moore, who arranged her first recordings. She made her radio debut October 4, 1946, on Meredith Willson's Sparkle Time program on CBS.

== Career ==
Warren headlined clubs and theaters in London and across the U.S., including the Bon Soir, the Blue Angel and the St. Regis Hotel Maisonette in New York City and Ye Little Club in Beverly Hills. She co-starred as Mrs. Peachum in the off-Broadway revival of The Threepenny Opera with Jerry Orbach, Ed Asner and Beatrice Arthur and was also seen in the musical Livin' The Life with Alice Ghostley and Edward Villella.

Warren's television appearances include The Tonight Show, The Ed Sullivan Show, The Liberace Show, and The Summer Chevy Show. She also was seen on screen in the films Midnight Frolics and The Devil's Sleep.

Her first dubbing assignment was for the film Lured in 1947, followed by The Paleface in 1948, in which she sang for Iris Adrian. She dubbed the singing voice for Lucille Ball in Sorrowful Jones in 1949, and Fancy Pants in 1950. The following year, she auditioned to sing for Ava Gardner in MGM's remake of Show Boat (1951 film) and won the job over such other applicants as Dinah Shore and Lee Wiley. She also provided all of the female voices for John Hubley's UPA short Rooty Toot Toot, which was voted No. 41 of the "50 Greatest Cartoons" of all time and was nominated for an Academy Award for "Best Animated Short Film". She is also notable for recognizing the talent of Connie Converse, and for incorporating her songs into her permanent repertoire.

Warren recorded for such labels as Capitol Records, Verve Records, ABC Paramount Records, and Outstanding Records, and was married for 54 years to jazz musician Paul Smith, with whom she also occasionally performed. She co-starred over a 20-year period with fellow "ghost singers" India Adams, Betty Wand and Jo Ann Greer in the musical revue Hollywood's Secret Singing Stars. A two-CD retrospective of her recordings entitled "There's a Man in My Life" was released in 2016 by Fresh Sound Records.

In January 2016, Warren sang at the La Cicada Club in Los Angeles at a party held to celebrate the release of Lyn Stanley's album Interlude. Warren had been instrumental in encouraging Stanley to embark on her jazz-singing career in 2012. On April 24, 2016 (at the age of 93), Warren debuted a brand-new one-woman show entitled "I Ain't Done Yet" at the Warner Grand Theatre in San Pedro, CA. She is managed by Alan Eichler.

On March 30, 2017, Warren returned to New York for the first time in nearly 60 years to headline at Feinstein's/54 Below at the age of 94, to critical acclaim, and continues to perform regularly at such clubs as the Catalina Jazz Club in Hollywood.

== Later life ==
She turned 100 on July 11, 2022.
