= Sweet Adeline (musical) =

- Music: Jerome Kern
- Lyrics: Oscar Hammerstein II
- Productions: 1929 Broadway

Sweet Adeline is a musical with music by Jerome Kern, book and lyrics by Oscar Hammerstein II and original orchestration by Robert Russell Bennett. It premiered on Broadway in 1929. The story, set in the Gay Nineties, concerns a Hoboken, New Jersey girl who, unlucky in love, becomes a Broadway star.

== Production history ==
The musical opened at Hammerstein's Theatre on September 3, 1929 and closed March 22, 1930, after 234 performances. Produced by Arthur Hammerstein the show was directed by Reginald Hammerstein (the brother of Oscar Hammerstein II) and was choreographed by Danny Dare. The cast on opening night included Charles Butterworth, Helen Morgan, and Max Hoffman, Jr.

The Goodspeed Opera House in East Haddam, Connecticut, produced the musical in May 1977, starring Cynthia Wells.

In 1985 a concert presentation was given at The Town Hall in New York as part of a Jerome Kern centennial celebration, which featured Judy Kaye and Paula Laurence.

Sweet Adeline was produced in 1997 as part of City Center's Encores! Great American Musicals in Concert. The concert was directed by Eric D. Schaeffer, the choreographer was John DeLuca, adaption by Norman Allen with the scenic consultant John Lee Beatty, apparel coordinator Gregg Barnes, lighting by Howell Binkley and sound by Bruce Cameron. The cast starred Dorothy Loudon, Tony Randall, Patti Cohenour, Stephen Bogardus, Gary Beach, Myra Carter, Patrick Breen, Kristi Lynes, Hugh Panaro, and Jacquelyn Piro.

== Songs ==
Setting: Hoboken, New Jersey, 1898; San Juan Hill, Cuba; Olympia Burlesque Theatre, the Bowery; Various Broadway theatres

Act 1

- "Play Us a Polka Dot"
- "Twas Not So Long Ago"
- "My Husband's First Wife"
- "Here Am I"
- "First Mate Martin"
- "Spring is Here"
- "Out of the Blue"
- "Naughty Boy"
- "Oriental Moon"
- "Mollie O' Donahue"
- "Why Was I Born?"
- "Finale"

Act 2

- "Twas Not So Long Ago" (Reprise)
- "Winter in Central Park"
- "The Sun About to Rise"
- "Some Girl is on Your Mind"
- "Don't Ever Leave Me"
- "Here Am I" (Reprise)
- "Finaletto"
- "Indestructible Kate"
- "Take Me for a Honeymoon Ride"
- "Harbor Scene"
- "Twas Not So Long Ago" (Reprise)
- "Finale"

== Film ==
A film based on the stage musical was released in 1935 by Warner Brothers, directed by Mervyn LeRoy, and starred Irene Dunne as Adeline, Louis Calhern, Noah Berry and Hugh Herbert.

== Reception ==
Opening just before the stock market crash, it received rave reviews, but the elaborate, old-fashioned piece was a step back from the innovations in Kern and Hammerstein's Show Boat (1927), or even Kern's Princess Theatre shows.
