= Let's Begin =

Song composed by Jerome Kern (1933)

"Let's Begin" is a popular song composed in 1933 by Jerome Kern, with lyrics written by Otto Harbach. It was written for the musical Roberta (1933) where it was introduced by George Murphy. In the 1935 film version, the song was performed by Fred Astaire, Candy Candido and Gene Sheldon, with the band.

== Notable recordings ==
- Anita O'Day - Pick Yourself Up with Anita O'Day (1957)
- Tony Bennett - The Beat of My Heart.
- Ella Fitzgerald - Ella Fitzgerald Sings the Jerome Kern Songbook (1963)
- Margaret Whiting - Margaret Whiting Sings the Jerome Kern Songbook (1960)
