= Ol' Man River =

1925 composition by Jerome Kern and Oscar Hammerstein II

- Sheet music for the song

Single by Paul Whiteman and His Concert Orchestra with Paul Robeson and Mixed Chorus
- Written: 1925
- Published: 1927 T. B. Harms Co.
- Released: May 1927
- Recorded: March 1, 1928
- Studio: Liederkranz Hall, New York City
- Genre: Show tune
- Label: Victor 35912
- Composer: Jerome Kern
- Lyricist: Oscar Hammerstein II

"Ol' Man River" is a show tune from the 1927 musical Show Boat with music by Jerome Kern and lyrics by Oscar Hammerstein II, who wrote the song in 1925. The song contrasts the struggles and hardships of African Americans with the endless, uncaring flow of the Mississippi River. It is sung from the point of view of a black stevedore on a showboat, and is the most famous song from the show. The song is meant to be performed in a slow tempo; it is sung complete once in the musical's lengthy first scene by the stevedore "Joe" who travels with the boat, and, in the stage version, is heard four more times in brief reprises. Joe serves as a sort of musical one-man Greek chorus, and the song, when reprised, comments on the action, as if saying, "This has happened, but the river keeps rolling on anyway."

The song is notable for several aspects: the lyrical pentatonic-scale melody, the subjects of toil and social class, the metaphor to the Mississippi, and as a bass solo (rare in musicals, solos for baritones or tenors being more common).

Paul Whiteman and His Orchestra had a hit recording of the song in early 1928, in a much faster tempo than Kern and Hammerstein intended, featuring Bing Crosby on vocals and Bix Beiderbecke on cornet. A second version was recorded on March 1, with Paul Whiteman and his Concert Orchestra and bass singer Paul Robeson on vocals, sung in a dance tempo. The latter was inducted into the Grammy Hall of Fame in 2006, and a 1936 rendition by Robeson also finished No. 24 in AFI's 100 Years...100 Songs 2004 survey of top tunes in American cinema. Its musical composition entered the public domain on January 1, 2023.

== Early versions ==
"Ol' Man River" was first performed in the original stage production of Show Boat on December 27, 1927, by Jules Bledsoe, who also sang it in the part-talkie 1929 film, although that film version had little to do with the stage musical. Bledsoe also recorded the song years later. The first known recording of the song was by "Kenn" Sisson and His Orchestra, recorded on December 27, 1927, with Irving Kaufman on vocals.

Hammerstein and Kern originally wrote the song "Ol' Man River" for the voice of baritone Broadway Jones. Hammerstein had initially determined to cast Jones in the role of Joe for the original production after hearing the singer perform in Palm Beach, Florida, and Kern later traveled down to Florida to hear him perform as well. Jones, a partner of Eubie Blake, was offered the role but was not willing to take the salary that he was offered which was less than he was already making as a performer. Jones later performed the song in Fanchon and Marco's 1929 musical revue California Capers.

The part of Joe in the original New York production was also offered to Paul Robeson, but he too declined the part. Robeson later played the role in the 1928 London production and became closely associated with the song. Arguably the most famous rendition of the song, one that is still noted today, was sung by Robeson in James Whale's classic 1936 film version of Show Boat. Robeson also recorded the song with Paul Whiteman and his Concert Orchestra in 1928, and multiple times in the 1930s.

From the show's opening number "Cotton Blossom", the notes in the phrase "Cotton Blossom, Cotton Blossom" are the same notes as those in the phrase "Ol' Man River, dat Ol' Man River," but inverted. However, "Cotton Blossom" was written first, and "Ol' Man River" was written only after Kern and Hammerstein realized they needed a song to end the first scene in the show. Hammerstein decided to use the idea of the Mississippi River as a basis for the song and told Kern to use the melody that the stevedores sang in "Cotton Blossom" but invert some of it, and slow down the tempo. This inversion gave "Ol' Man River" a tragic quality.

== Robeson's alterations to song lyrics ==
Beginning about 1938 to the end of his career, Paul Robeson changed a few of the lyrics of "Ol' Man River" when singing it at recitals but never in actual stage performances of Show Boat and not in the 1936 film version. (In addition to the 1928 and 1932 stage productions as well as the 1936 film version, he appeared in a Los Angeles stage revival in 1940.) Except for the change of the word "niggers" to "darkies", the lyrics of the song as Robeson performed it in the 1936 film version of the show remain exactly as Oscar Hammerstein II originally wrote them in 1927. However, after 1938, Robeson would record the song only with the lyrics that he had used in his post-1936 concert recitals.

In the 1978 one-man play Paul Robeson, by Phillip Hayes Dean, there is a (perhaps fictitious) reference to the change in the lyrics - an unseen interviewer asks Robeson (played by James Earl Jones) about the original lyrics, and he responds "No, I don't sing it that way anymore".

In the 1951 film version of Show Boat, as well as the 1962 studio recording and the 1966 Lincoln Center revival of the show, William Warfield sang only the introductory verse and the lyrics to the main section of the song, and omitted what could be considered a controversial section, in contrast to both Jules Bledsoe (who sang it in the prologue to the 1929 film version) and Robeson (who sang the whole song in the 1936 film). The section that Warfield omitted begins:

Niggers all work on de Mississippi,
Niggers all work while de white folks play...

In the 1936 film, the word "niggers" was changed to "darkies". Ever since the 1946 revival, the term has been changed to "colored folks", although there have been revivals that change the lines to Here we all work on de Mississippi,/ Here we all work while de white folks play. Al Jolson sang a version starting with "lots of folks work on the Mississippi." Also, the phrase "feared of dyin' " (rather than "skeered of dyin' ") has been sung in some recordings, notably Lawrence Tibbett's 1930s version, Gordon MacRae's 1950s version (first heard on The Railroad Hour), and Frank Sinatra's 1946 performance, first heard in the film Till the Clouds Roll By.

Robeson's own 1938 changes in the lyrics of the song are as follows:

- Instead of "Dere's an ol' man called de Mississippi, / Dat's de ol' man that I'd like to be...", Robeson sang "There's an ol' man called the Mississippi, / That's the ol' man I don't like to be"..."
- Instead of "Tote that barge! / Lift that bale! / Git a little drunk, / An' you land in jail...", Robeson sang "Tote that barge and lift dat bale!/ You show a little grit / And you lands in jail.."
- Instead of "Ah gits weary / An' sick of tryin'; / Ah'm tired of livin' / An skeered of dyin', / But Ol' Man River, / He jes' keeps rolling along!", Robeson sang "But I keeps laffin'/ Instead of cryin' / I must keep fightin'; / Until I'm dyin', / And Ol' Man River, / He'll just keep rollin' along!" In Scene 7 of Act II of the show, Joe does sing this verse, but rather than singing "I must keep fightin' until I'm dyin", sings "I must keep livin' until I'm dyin,/ But Ol' Man River,/ He jes' keeps rollin' along!" According to the 1988 EMI album of Show Boat, these are Hammerstein's authentic lyrics for this reprise.

In recitals and in several of his many recordings of the song, Robeson also omitted the controversial section "Niggers all work on de Mississippi...", etc., with its middle portion "Don't look up/ An' don't look down/ You don't dast make / De white boss frown", etc., as well as its concluding "Lemme go ' way from de Mississippi/ Lemme go ' way from de white man boss, etc." . However, Robeson did include a portion of these lyrics in the 1932 4-record 78 rpm album of selections from Show Boat.

Gordon MacRae's version of the song, as performed on The Railroad Hour radio program (late 1940s or 1950s), changed the phrase "white man boss" to "big man boss".

The Temptations, in their rendition on The Temptations in a Mellow Mood (1967), changed any references to the "white man boss" to "rich man boss", as well as "Here we all work while the white boys play" to "Here we all work while the rich boys play".

In 1988, EMI/Angel Records issued a 3-CD set of the complete score of Show Boat, starring Frederica Von Stade, Jerry Hadley, Teresa Stratas, and Bruce Hubbard, conducted by John McGlinn. On this album, the original 1927 lyrics of Ol' Man River were heard for the first time on a high fidelity stereo recording.

While Robeson's changes to the lyrics were mostly sung by himself, Leon and Eric Bibb together sang a changed version in their 2006 tribute album Praising Peace: A Tribute to Paul Robeson, and a clip exists of William Warfield singing the song with the changes that Robeson incorporated into it.

== Other versions ==
Indian singer Bhupen Hazarika met Robeson in New York in the 1950s. His Assamese song "Bistirno Dupare" is influenced by "Ol' Man River", with the Brahmaputra replacing the Mississippi. Hazarika's song has in turn been translated into Bengali (with the same name) and Hindi (as "Ganga Behti Ho Kyu", about the Ganges).

Judy Garland performed Ol' Man River on the premiere episode of her CBS musical television variety series The Judy Garland Show in 1963, lending her renowned contralto voice to perhaps the most notable interpretation of the song by a female artist.

The Beach Boys recorded a version of Ol' Man River with "Old Folks at Home" as an instrumental intro during the recording sessions for their 1968 20/20 album, which did not make the final cut.

Jim Croce recorded a version of the song for his album “You Don’t Mess Around with Jim” in 1972.

== See also ==
- Spirituals – also known as Negro spirituals - is a genre of songs originating in the US and created by African-Americans describing the hardships of slavery
- That Lucky Old Sun – a country-western song addressing similar themes and popularized by Frankie Laine
