= Public Landing =

Public Landing may refer to:

- Public Landing, Maryland
- Public Landing, Cincinnati

== See also ==
- Landing (water transport)
