= Elise Bartlett =

American actress

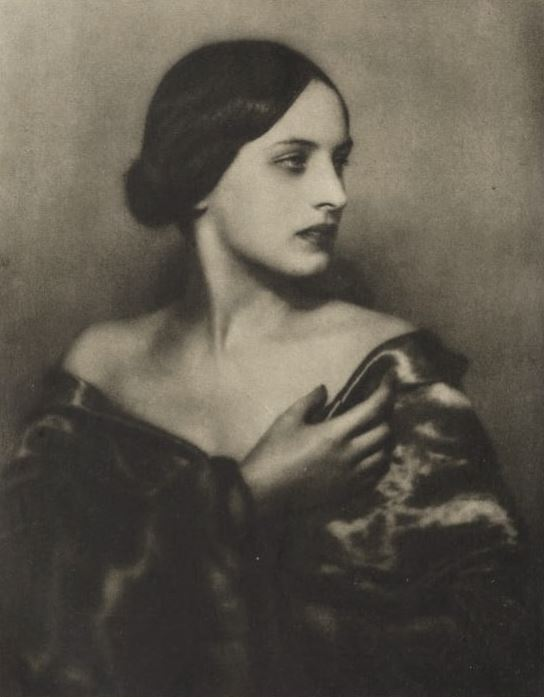
- Elise Bartlett, c1923
- Born: Elise Bartlett Porter; October 5, 1897; Union City, Tennessee, US
- Died: May 22, 1947 (aged 49); Daytona Beach, Florida, US
- Occupation: Actress
- Spouses: Joseph Schildkraut (m. 1922; div. 1930) Horace Liveright (m. 1931; div. 1932) Michel Picard (m. 1934)

Elise Bartlett (born Elise Bartlett Porter; October 5, 1897 – May 22, 1947) was an American actress who appeared in numerous stage productions throughout the 1920s and 1930s, as well as several feature films, including the 1929 film Show Boat. She was born into a rich and aristocratic family.

Bartlett's several marriages were well-reported during her life, which included Joseph Schildkraut, who she divorced in 1930, Horace Liveright which lasted just several months, and later Michel Picard. She died in May 1947 of alcoholism.

== Early life ==
Born in Union City, Tennessee, Bartlett grew up in Pittsburgh, Pennsylvania, where she lived with her parents Madison and Ella and an African-American house servant named Sarah Garnell. She was educated at a convent in Paris and returned to the United States in May 1914. She had always wanted to perform on stage since she was a baby. She used the first two parts of her name for her stage name, dropping her surname of Porter. From watching her first play at Nixon's Theater, her big ambition was to then become an actress, dreaming of "seeing her name in electric bulbs on Broadway." She learnt various languages to perfection outside her stage career, including German, French, Spanish as well as her native English, and would spend considerable time studying, as well as training in singing, fencing, and dancing.

== Career ==
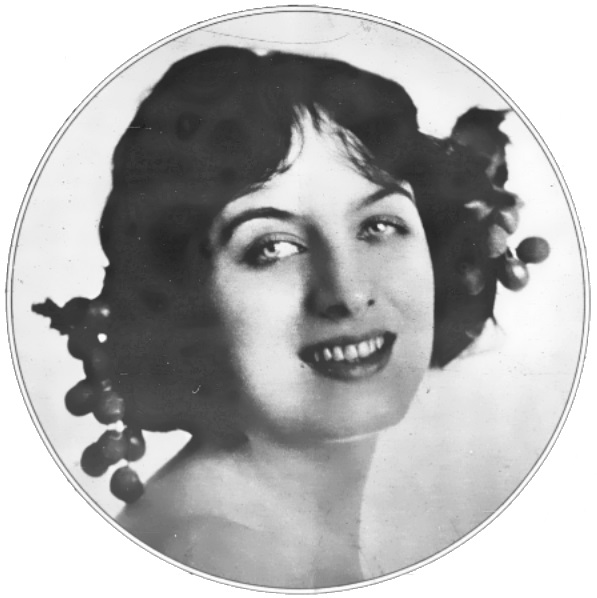
Bartett as pictured in a 1920 edition of Midweek Pictorial

Among Bartlett's earliest reported play credits were in Here Comes The Bride and The Gipsy Trail in May 1918, the latter of which she was described as being "a lovely young girl". She appeared alongside Leo Carrillo in a production of The Bad Man, changing her gown several times as she did not feel her choices matched the mood she wanted to convey. In May 1930, she presided over a meeting of notable stage stars in a campaign to increase support for the Civic Repertory Theater.

Bartlett lived in California for six years before moving to New York and appeared in 13 plays, such as Pagan Lady. Throughout 1934–1936, she had a hiatus in her stage career of around two years due to her interest in tung trees and she became "intensely interested" in their development during a visit to the family's summer residence in Florida. She stated that she was likely to return for an engagement in Chicago in 1936 and planned to remain an actress "for another five years."

She was featured in the film Show Boat, as well as stage productions So To Bed, Lilliom and Children of the Moon to name a few.

== Personal ==
Bartlett was described as a well educated "blue grass beauty" and was born into a rich and aristocratic family. Her father, M. Madison Russell Porter, was a member of the East India Company and would often travel around the world in his capacity as a phosphate manufacturer. Her mother was Ella B Porter and maternal grandmother was Ella S Bartlett. She was the only daughter of her parents.

=== Marriages ===
==== Joseph Schildkraut ====
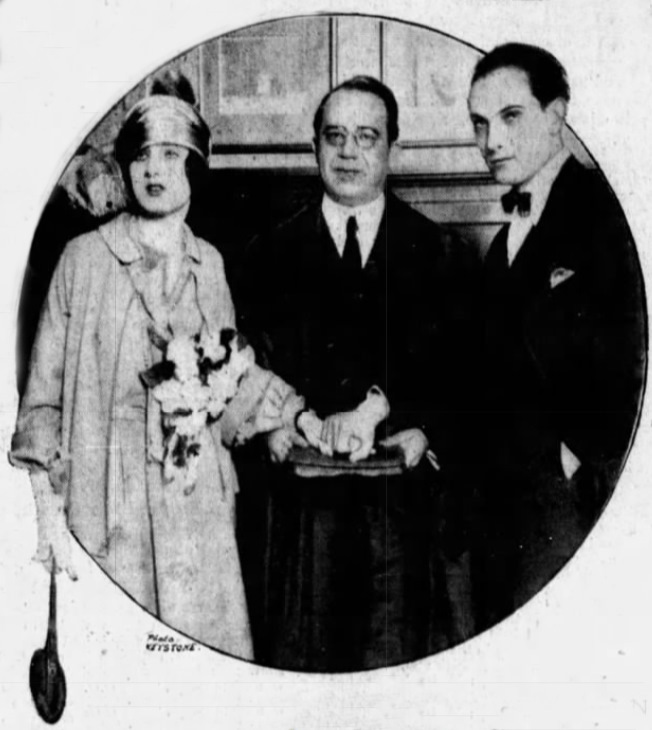
Wedding ceremony of Elise Porter and Joseph Schildkraut, c.1922

Bartlett first met Joseph Schildkraut in his dressing room when she approached him to audition for the part of Solveig in one of his plays. Schildkraut was heralded as "the handsomest man in the world" by Max Reinhardt, a title he resented. He was born in Romania to a Romanian father Rudolph Schildkraut, a distinguished actor and a Hungarian mother, although also had Turkish and Spanish ancestry. They were married in Philadelphia City Hall in the presence of their parents on April 2, 1922, following Schildkraut's engagement in 'Liliom' at which point the couple then sailed to Europe. Upon their marriage, Bartlett lost her American citizenship, though this was restored by the Federal Court in 1926.

Reports emerged in 1926 that the couple were to be divorced, just over 3 years after getting married. It was reported that shortly after their marriage, the couple disagreed on ways in which they could improve the other's performances, in particular from Schildkraut who was critical of Bartlett only following their marriage. Bartlett said that in the climax of a love scene between the couple, Schildkraut would whisper "mean remarks" in her ear regarding her acting ability, while she had to pretend to be "almost faint with love." She would also endure physical hurt, such as pinching until she eventually "exploded" in 1925 and disclosed the nature of their relationship while filing for divorce in Chicago, which her husband did not take seriously, reasoning that divorce was "impossible" as they both loved each other. Bartlett instead considered that a "stage divorce" may be more appropriate, where they would not play together in the same company or criticize the work of each other for a five-year period. This ultimately did not bore out as envisaged and Schildkraut noted that "if my wife wishes to be freed from me I shall probably not make any contest", commenting that while he still loved her, he would not live unhappily. She was ultimately awarded a divorce on June 9, 1930, in an agreement reached out of court, in which Schildkraut would have to pay his wife a $250 weekly alimony and divide $20,000 worth of "community property".

==== Horace Liveright ====
In December 1931, Bartlett announced her engagement to producer and publisher Horace Liveright, having known each other for eight years. Liveright by that time was managing Bartlett. Just four months of living together, the couple filed for divorce, with Bartlett saying that "my marriage to him was just something I shouldn't have done. I found that out immediately after we were married." She described him as a "charming fellow" and had no resentment, despite reports of physical abuse between the couple.

==== Michel Picard ====
Her final marriage was to Longshore Beach and Country Club manager Michel Picard. The marriage was performed by Justice of the Peace John Carpenter with just one witness. Picard had previously been married to Leona Lane who he divorced in 1930. Bartlett had known Picard for ten years and said she "simply adores" him.

== Death ==
Bartlett died suddenly at a local hospital in Daytona Beach on May 23, 1947 from alcoholism. The funeral was arranged by Baggett-McIntosh.

== Filmography ==
- The Con in Economy (1919)
- The Angel of Broadway (1927)
- A Harp in Hock (1927)
- Show Boat (1929)
- Oh Sailor Behave (1930)
- The Hot Heiress (1931)
