= Show Boat (1929 film) =

1929 film

- Directed by: Harry A. Pollard
- Written by: Charles Kenyon (continuity); Tom Reed
- Based on: Show Boat; 1926 novel by Edna Ferber Show Boat; 1927 musical by Jerome Kern and Oscar Hammerstein II
- Produced by: Carl Laemmle
- Starring: Laura La Plante; Joseph Schildkraut; Emily Fitzroy; Otis Harlan
- Cinematography: Gilbert Warrenton
- Edited by: Daniel Mandell
- Music by: Jerome Kern; Joseph Cherniavsky
- Production company: Universal Pictures
- Distributed by: Universal Pictures
- Release date: July 28, 1929
- Running time: 146 minutes (with prologue); 129 minutes (without prologue); 114 minutes (without sound sequences)
- Country: United States
- Languages: Sound (Part-Talkie); Talking Sequences; English Intertitles
- Box office: $1,643,000 (rentals)

Show Boat is a 1929 American pre-Code sound part-talkie romantic drama film based on the 1926 novel Show Boat by Edna Ferber. The film initially did not use the 1927 stage musical of the same name as a source, but scenes were later added into the film incorporating two of the songs from the musical as well as other songs. Many of these songs from the stage show were featured in a special prologue that was added to the picture before it was released. This film was produced and released by Universal. Like the majority of films during the early sound era, a silent version was made for movie theatres that had not yet converted to sound.

The film was long believed to be lost, but most of it has been found and released on LaserDisc and shown on Turner Classic Movies. Like most early sound films the film was released in both sound-on-disc and sound-on-film versions. A number of Vitaphone type records for the sound-on-disc version were located in the mid-1990s. The soundtrack for the film was originally recorded using the sound-on-film Western Electric process and transferred to the disc format for those theatres that did not have the capability of playing the sound-on-film format. Two more soundtrack records were discovered in 2005.

As a film first published in 1929, it entered the public domain on January 1, 2025.

== Plot ==
The full movie

The eighteen-year-old Magnolia meets, falls in love with, and elopes with riverboat gambler Gaylord Ravenal.

After her father Captain Andy dies, Magnolia, Ravenal, and their daughter Kim leave the boat and go to live in Chicago, where they live off Ravenal's gambling earnings and are alternately rich and poor. Finally, Parthy announces she is coming to visit at a time when Ravenal is completely broke, and, fearing her wrath, he abandons Magnolia and Kim, after which Magnolia finds a job singing at a local club and eventually becomes famous. Years later, Parthy dies, and Magnolia, who had long been estranged from her because of her attitude toward Ravenal, returns to the show boat. Magnolia and Ravenal are reunited on the show boat at the end of the film, and after Parthy's death, Magnolia gives her own inheritance money to her daughter Kim.

== Cast ==
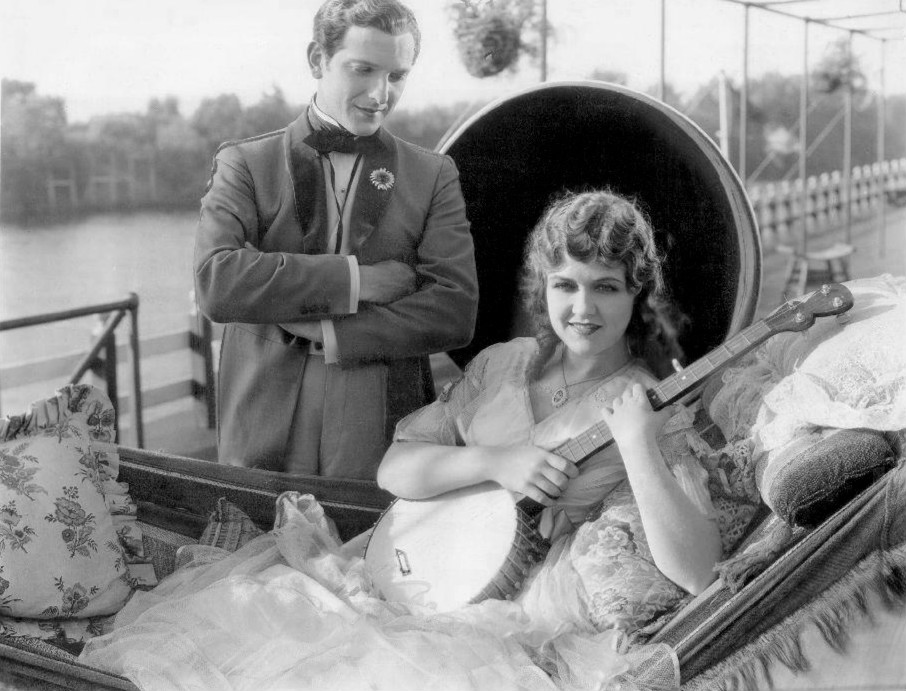
Laura La Plante and Joseph Schildkraut in a scene from the film.

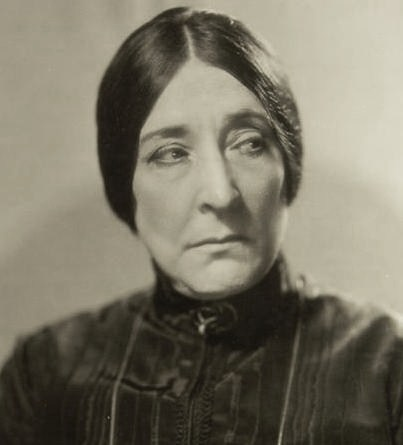
Emily Fitzroy as Parthy

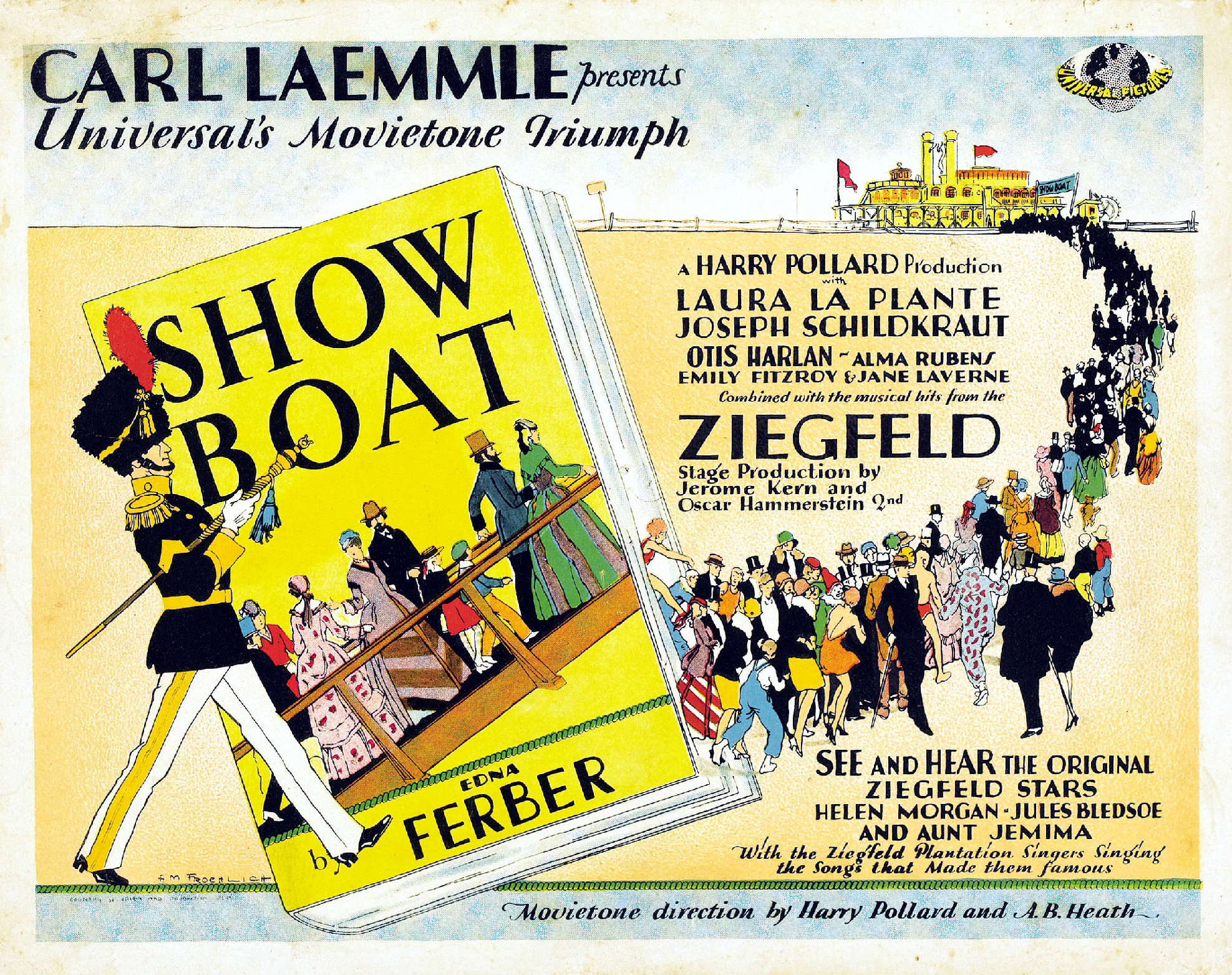
Universal lobby card, 1929

- Laura La Plante as Magnolia Hawks
- Joseph Schildkraut as Gaylord Ravenal
- Emily Fitzroy as Parthenia 'Parthy' Ann Hawks
- Otis Harlan as Capt'n Andy Hawks and the Master of Ceremonies in Prologue
- Alma Rubens as Julie Dozier
- Jack McDonald as Windy
- Jane La Verne as Magnolia as a Child/Kim
- Neely Edwards as Schultzy
- Elise Bartlett as Elly
- Stepin Fetchit as Joe
- Gertrude Howard as Queenie

== Music ==
The film featured a theme song entitled "Love Sings A Song In My Heart" by Joseph Cherniavsky (music) and Clarence J. Marks (words). This song is heard on numerous occasions on the soundtrack as it served as the theme music for the sequences dealing with love.

== Sound adaptation ==
These were the years in which film studios were making a transition from silent films to sound films and this version of Show Boat was made as a silent film. The studio panicked when they realized that audiences might be expecting a sound version of Show Boat because sound films had become so popular, and the film was temporarily withheld from release.

Subsequently, several scenes were then reshot to include about 30 minutes of dialogue and singing. At first, the songs recorded for the film had nothing to do with the Broadway score. However, Universal began to fear that audiences might instead be expecting, rather than just the Ferber novel, a film version of the stage musical, which had become a smash hit and was still playing on Broadway at the same time that the 1929 film premiered. So, a two-reel sound prologue, featuring original Broadway cast members Helen Morgan (Julie), Jules Bledsoe (Joe), Tess Gardella (Queenie) and the Jubilee Singers singing five songs from the show, was added, and the movie was released both as a part-talkie at a time when most films being released were all-talking.

Otis Harlan, who played Cap'n Andy in the film, served as Master of Ceremonies in the prologue, which featured legendary impresario Florenz Ziegfeld, producer of the stage musical version of Show Boat, and Carl Laemmle, the producer of the film, as themselves. In the actual storyline of the film, Laura la Plante, with a dubbed singing voice, performs five songs, two of them from the stage musical – "Ol' Man River" (which Magnolia does not sing at all in any other version of Show Boat), and "Can't Help Lovin' Dat Man". Both of these songs were sung in circumstances entirely different from any version of the musical. The other songs that Ms. La Plante sang in the film were traditional spirituals such as "I Got Shoes" and (it is believed) "Deep River", as well as a coon song of the early 1900s entitled "Coon, Coon, Coon". Her singing voice was dubbed by soprano Eva Olivetti.

It was long believed that an entirely new score was written by Billy Rose for the film, but according to Miles Kreuger in his book Show Boat: The Story of a Classic American Musical, this turns out to not be true. Rose wrote only one new song for the film, and the Broadway score was not dropped because of any suggestion by him, as is often claimed.

The singing voice of Stepin Fetchit, who played Joe in the film, was provided by Jules Bledsoe, the original Joe of the 1927 stage production of the musical. Fetchit mouthed the lyrics to a popular song of the time entitled "The Lonesome Road", which, as sung on the soundtrack by Bledsoe, served as the film's finale instead of a final reprise of Ol' Man River, as in the show.

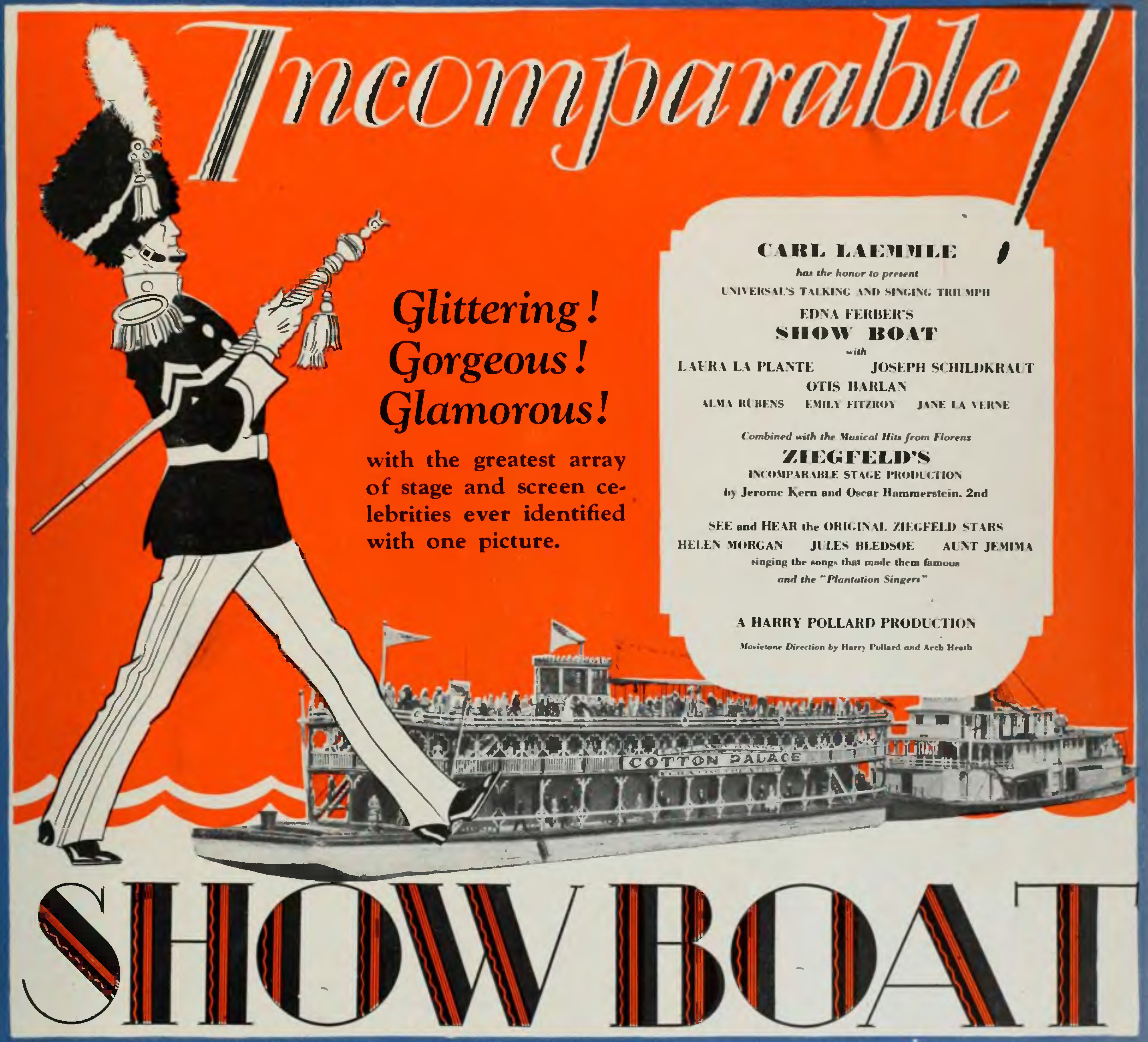
Ad from The Film Daily, 1929

The entire stage score, except for "Can't Help Lovin' Dat Man", "Bill", "Ol' Man River", and the little-known songs "C'mon Folks! (Queenie's Ballyhoo)" and "Hey Feller!", was replaced in the 1929 film by several spirituals and popular songs written by other songwriters, and largely because of this, the movie was not a success. Most of the songs taken from the stage version were heard only in the prologue and in the film's exit music, not the film itself. It is likely though that the fact that it was a part-talkie may have played a part in its failure. The then-recent 1929 film version of The Desert Song, an all-talking sound film almost literally faithful to the stage musical of the same name, had been a huge success, and audiences were no longer willing to accept part-talking musical films.

Several of the extant parts of the 1929 Show Boat have been combined and occasionally shown on Turner Classic Movies. Fragments of the prologue not included in the TCM showings, both sound and picture, were shown as part of A&E's biography of Florenz Ziegfeld, and have turned up on YouTube. However, in the TCM version, the visual print of the prologue sequence has been replaced with an "Overture" card.

== See also ==
- List of early sound feature films (1926–1929)
