= Gaylord Ravenal =

Character from "Show Boat"

Gaylord Ravenal is the leading male character in Edna Ferber's 1926 novel Show Boat, in the Jerome Kern-Oscar Hammerstein II musical adaptation, and in the films and other adaptations of the story. He is a handsome, compulsive riverboat gambler, who becomes the leading man of the showboat Cotton Blossom at the same time that Magnolia Hawks, the captain's daughter, becomes the leading lady. In the novel, this happens several years after the illegally married mulatto Julie Dozier (Magnolia's good friend) and her white husband Steve Baker have left the show on the boat. In the musical, it happens immediately after Julie and Steve are forced to leave the show. In the musical, Magnolia and Gaylord meet in the first scene of the show, before Julie and Steve leave, as Kern and Hammerstein wished to bring Gaylord into the story early. In the novel the two meet right after Gaylord is hired as leading man, long after Julie and Steve have left.

== Character history ==
Magnolia and Gaylord fall in love and marry after a whirlwind courtship. In the novel, they stay on the boat until shortly after the accidental drowning of Magnolia's father, Cap'n Andy, during a storm. Because of the incessant nagging of Magnolia's mother, Parthy, they leave the boat with their baby daughter and move to Chicago, where they live off Gaylord's gambling earnings. They are alternately rich and poor, and Gaylord is occasionally unfaithful to his wife and belittles her. Years later, upon hearing that Parthy is coming to visit, and finding himself broke, he borrows money from the local whorehouse madam and returns, completely drunk, to the boarding house at which they are living. As he sleeps, Magnolia goes to the whorehouse to return the money, is horrified and saddened to discover that her old friend Julie is working as a secretary there. Magnolia returns to the boarding house to discover that Gaylord has abandoned her. He never returns, and Magnolia brings up their daughter alone. Gaylord eventually dies under unexplained circumstances, in San Francisco. Years later, after Parthy dies, Magnolia returns to Mississippi to manage the showboat and gives her daughter all of Parthy's inheritance money.

In the musical, Gaylord is a much more sympathetic character. None of the characters in the story die in the musical, and Gaylord remains faithful to Magnolia. The pair moves to Chicago with their daughter, as in the novel, but not because of Parthy's nagging. Rather, Gaylord wants to show Magnolia the big city. He deserts her after ten years, not because he fears the wrath of Parthy, but because he feels guilty over his gambling losses and his inability to support Magnolia. She gets a job as a nightclub singer when Julie, who is now an alcoholic, secretly quits the job so that Magnolia can have it. Magnolia goes on to become a Broadway star, with the encouragement of her father, Cap'n Andy, all the while raising her daughter alone. Twenty-three years later, when Magnolia retires and she and her now adult daughter (now a Broadway star herself) return to the boat for a family reunion, Gaylord is there waiting. He and Magnolia reconcile, and all is well. There are variations of this in the film versions.

== Portrayals ==
Gaylord was portrayed by Howard Marsh in the original 1927 stage production of Show Boat. Though producer Florenz Ziegfeld brought most of the original cast back in his 1932 revival of the show, Dennis King played Gaylord. In 1929, Joseph Schildkraut, complete with Viennese accent, was rather incongruously cast as a non-singing Gaylord in the first, part-talkie film version of Show Boat. In James Whale's 1936 film version, Allan Jones played the role. In the 1946 stage revival, which was revised by Kern and Hammerstein to accommodate a slightly shorter running time, Charles Fredericks played the role. In MGM's 1951 Technicolor remake, Howard Keel portrayed Gaylord.

The 1946 biopic of Kern's life, Till the Clouds Roll By, featured a re-enactment of some of the first act of Show Boat, with Tony Martin as Gaylord.
