= Clinton Area Showboat Theatre =

Summer stock professional theatre in Iowa, U.S.

Coordinates: 41.846744°N 90.183617°W

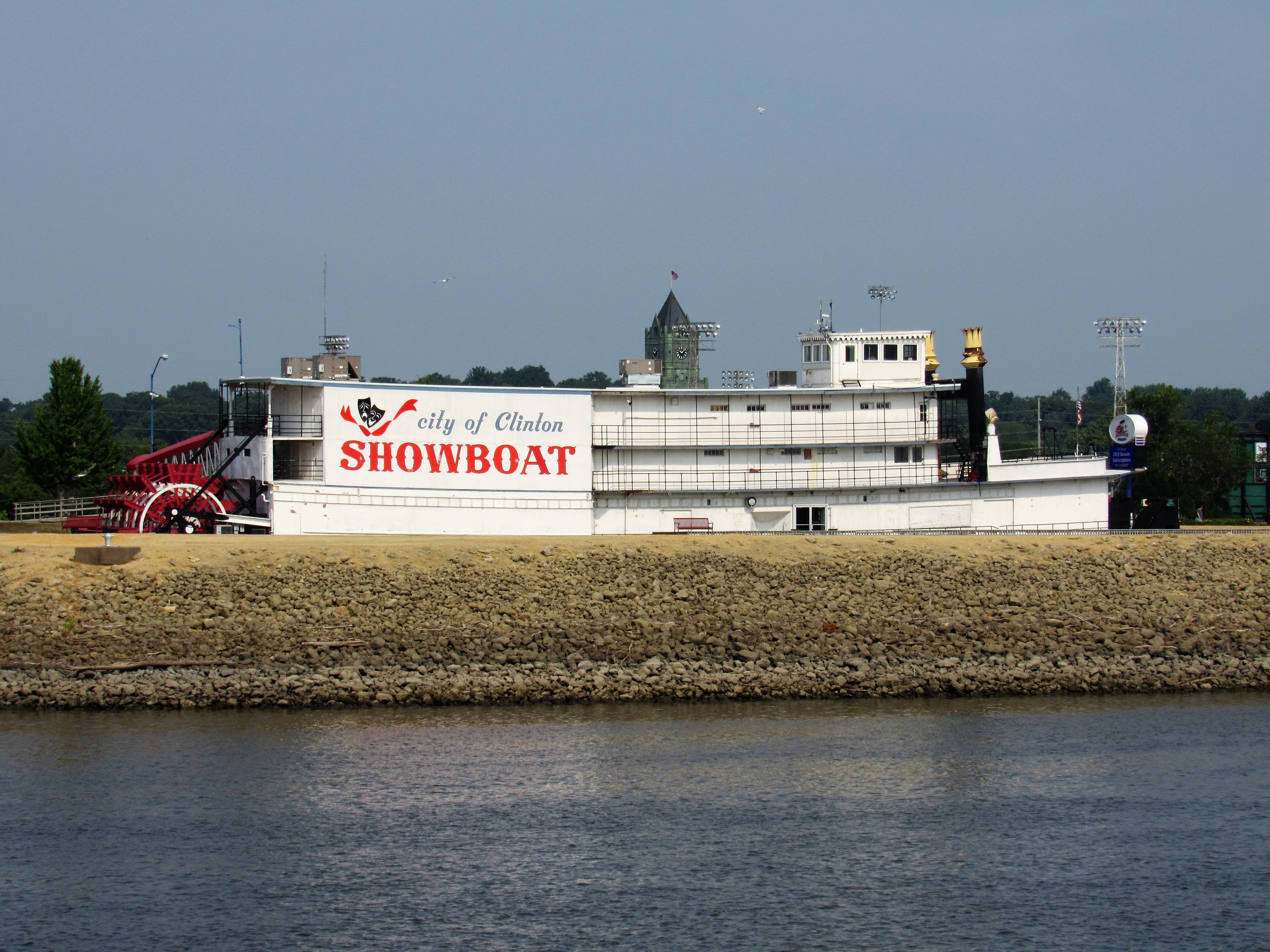
Clinton Area Showboat Theatre

The Clinton Area Showboat Theatre is a summer stock professional theatre in Clinton, Iowa. Currently run by Executive Producer James Kyle Davis, the showboat has been drydocked on the Army Corps of Engineers Levee. With a 217-seat theater, the Clinton Showboat has produced musicals and comedies for 39 years.

== History ==
=== Original construction ===
The original boat was built in 1936 by the Dravo Corporation near Pittsburgh and named Omar. She was created as a working boat, a coal-fired towboat for the Ohio River Company. Primarily steel, the boat is 207 feet long, 36 feet wide, and 37½ feet high. In the water, it displaces 581 gross tons.

The oaken paddlewheel, rebuilt in 1980, is approximately 32 feet in diameter. It was powered by two Marietta compound steam wheel engines that required 25 to 75 tons of coal a day. These engines produced 1,000 horsepower.

For 25 years, Omar pushed barges up and down the Ohio River. In 1962, the Ohio River Company donated the boat her to the State of West Virginia for its centennial celebration.

=== Renovation ===
The State of West Virginia converted the towboat into a showboat. The builder preserved the main deck, lounge and second deck captain's quarters. The original galley area and crew's quarters became the theater. By raising the pilothouse, the builders created a new third deck, providing theatre balcony and museum exhibition space. The pilothouse retained the captain's control wheel and the high view of the river. The new showboat was renamed Rhododendron, the West Virginia state flower.

=== Purchase by City of Clinton ===
On September 15, 1966, the city of Clinton, Iowa, purchased Rhododendron from the state of West Virginia at a public bid price of $21,165. A week later, the boat began its 1,600 mile journey from Morgantown, WV to Clinton. It was towed down the Monongahela River to Pittsburgh, then down the Ohio to Cairo, IL, then up the Mississippi River to Clinton.

Moored at Riverfront Park in Clinton, the boat was used by the city as a floating theatre.

=== City of Clinton ===
In 1975, the U. S. Army Corps of Engineers began construction of new flood control dike on the Clinton waterfront. This forced the showboat to relocate for the next five years. When the showboat returned to Clinton in 1980, it was rechristened City of Clinton.

After its return to Clinton, the City of Clinton was pulled out of the river and permanently installed on the new dike. This move was intended to protect the boat from winter damage in the river and make it more accessible to the public. At the same time, the exterior of the boat was painted and the interior refurbished.

=== Lillian Russell Theater ===
In 1980, the theater on the City of Clinton was named the "Lillian Russell Theater" in honor of the Clinton-born actress Lillian Russell. In 1940, the film biography of Russell was shown in Clinton as a world premiere. At that time, the city commissioned a brass plaque to commemorate that event. That plaque was installed in the Lillian Russell Theater.

In 1983, the Clinton Park Board and the Showboat Advisory Board decided to create its own theater company for the "Lillian Russell Theater". In previous years, the boards had been paying outside theater companies to stage plays and the move was considered more cost efficient. The boards hired an artistic director and founded the Showboat Players. The first performance was in the summer of 1984.

=== Clinton Area Showboat Theater ===
In 1988, a new nonprofit group was incorporated to run the Lillian Russell Theater, the Clinton Area Showboat Theater (CAST). By 1989, had leased the theater. The city converted the showboat museum into a theater shop. The city also replaced the boilers and converted the front portion of the main deck into a waiting area. In 1989 and 1990, this waiting area was used as a rehearsal space for the Showboat Players.

=== 1990's additions ===
In 1991, the city rebuilt the entire first deck of the City of Clinton, removing all the small motors, generators, and pumps. A ticket office for the Mississippi Belle II casino boat was constructed in the forward section of the first deck along with a new CAST box office and a concession stand. The City also installed air conditioning and heating on the first deck, in the theater and in the dressing rooms.

In 1992, the city installed a handicap elevator and created a wheel chair seating area in the back of the theater. In 1995, the city built a handicap ramp to the second deck.

With Mississippi Belle II, The Iowa Department of Criminal investigation and the Iowa Gaming Commission moving off the showboat, CAST now has complete use of the showboat, moving the box office to the area of the Gaming Commission and the Artistic Director’s office along with the Production Stage Manager’s office to the area vacated by the DCI. The old box office was removed to give more space across from the concession stand.

=== 2000's Remodeling ===
In 2006, the city installed a new fire control system, a new fire exit sign and a new air conditioning system. The exterior of the City of Clinton and its paddle wheel were painted.

Later in the decade, the theater received new carpeting, new wooden flooring, and new seats.

In June 2016, a proposal was discussed in the Clinton City Council to repaint the exterior of the boat again due to chipping and rust.

== Artistic Management ==
The Clinton Showboat is currently managed by Artistic Director Courtney Crouse who holds an MFA in Directing from Western Illinois University, and previously served as Associate Artistic Director at Timber Lake Playhouse.

Previous to 2023, former Timber Lake Playhouse Artistic Director James Beaudry served as Producing Artistic Director for the immediate two years post-COVID.

In 2014, CAST hired Matthew Teague Miller as the new producing artistic director. Miller had previously directed the musical Les Misérables at the neighboring Timber Lake Playhouse. Miller has a BFA in Musical Theatre from University of Cincinnati College Conservatory of Music and an MFA in Directing from University of North Carolina Greensboro. Miller served as Artistic Manager until the 2020 COVID shutdown when he resigned to focus on his family in California.

== Notes ==
As of 26 March 2010, this article is derived in whole or in part from Clinton Showboat. The copyright holder has licensed the content in a manner that permits reuse under CC BY-SA 3.0 and GFDL. All relevant terms must be followed. The original text was at "Clinton Showboat » The Boat"
