= Young April =

1926 film

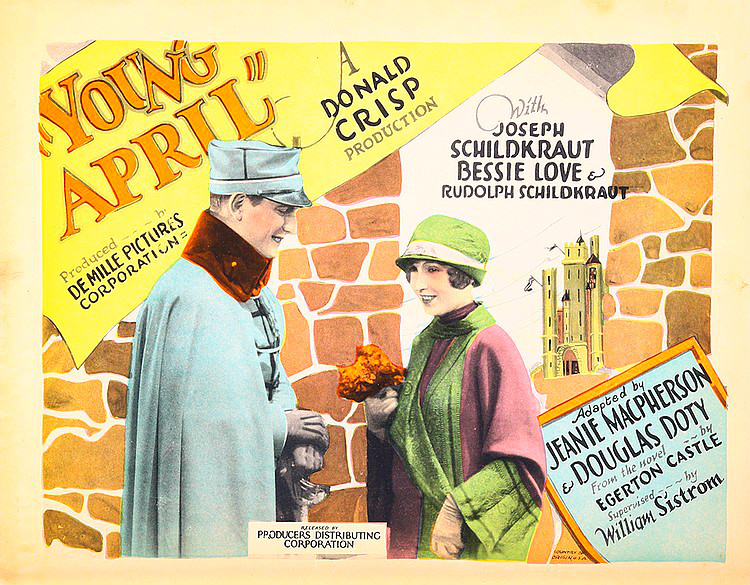
- Lobby card
- Directed by: Donald Crisp
- Written by: Jeanie MacPherson; Douglas Z. Doty
- Based on: Young April (novel) by Egerton Castle
- Produced by: William Sistrom
- Starring: Bessie Love; Joseph Schildkraut; Rudolph Schildkraut
- Cinematography: J. Peverell Marley
- Production company: De Mille Pictures Corp.
- Distributed by: Producers Distributing Corporation
- Release date: October 11, 1926 (U.S.)
- Running time: 7 reels; 6,858 feet
- Country: United States
- Language: Silent (English intertitles)

Young April is a 1926 American silent romantic comedy film directed by Donald Crisp, and starring Bessie Love, Joseph Schildkraut, and Rudolph Schildkraut. The film was produced by Cecil B. DeMille's production company and distributed by Producers Distributing Corporation. The film was adapted from Egerton Castle's 1899 novel of the same name by Jeanie MacPherson and Douglas Z. Doty. Art direction for the film was done by Anton Grot and its costumes were designed by Adrian.

== Plot ==
Prince Caryl of Belgravia is to be married to Archduchess Victoria, whom he has never met. He rebels by stealing the royal crown and going to Paris to pawn it and enjoy the money. Victoria, who has been raised an orphan in America, is told of her title and upcoming wedding, and goes to Paris for a final week of freedom and a shopping spree. While in Paris, she buys the royal crown and meets—and falls in love with—Caryl, each not knowing the other's royal identity.

Caryl's unethical brother Prince Michael comes to Paris, and prevents Victoria from revealing her identity to Caryl, who renounces his title to be with her. Michael kidnaps Victoria, but Caryl rescues her via an elaborate chase involving carriages, cars, and airplanes.

== Cast ==
- Joseph Schildkraut as Prince Caryl
- Rudolph Schildkraut as King Stefan
- Bessie Love as Archduchess Victoria
- Bryant Washburn as Prince Michael
- Clarence Geldart as Krutchki
- Alan Brooks as Jerry Lanningan
- Dot Farley as Maggie
- Carrie Daumery as Countess Morne
- Joseph Belmont (billed as Baldy Beldmont) as Hans or Ivan
- Jeanette Loff as extra (uncredited)
- Clarence Wilson as flower vendor (uncredited)

== Release and reception ==
Young April had its New York premiere at the Hippodrome. The film, particularly the production, received positive reviews.

== Censorship ==
Before Young April could be exhibited in Kansas, the Kansas Board of Review required the removal of several scenes. In reel 2, clothes strewn across a room, an undergarment draped on a painting, and a scene of a corset hanging from a staff with the intertitle "The flag of our fathers," are eliminated.

== Preservation and availability ==
Complete prints of Young April are held by:

- Archives du Film du CNC
- George Eastman Museum
- Arhiva Națională de Filme
- UCLA Film and Television Archive (on 16 mm)
- Filmoteca de Catalunya

The film was released on DVD in 2014 by Alpha Video.
