= Showboat Branson Belle =

Riverboat in Missouri, United States

Coordinates: 36°35′13″N 93°19′05″W

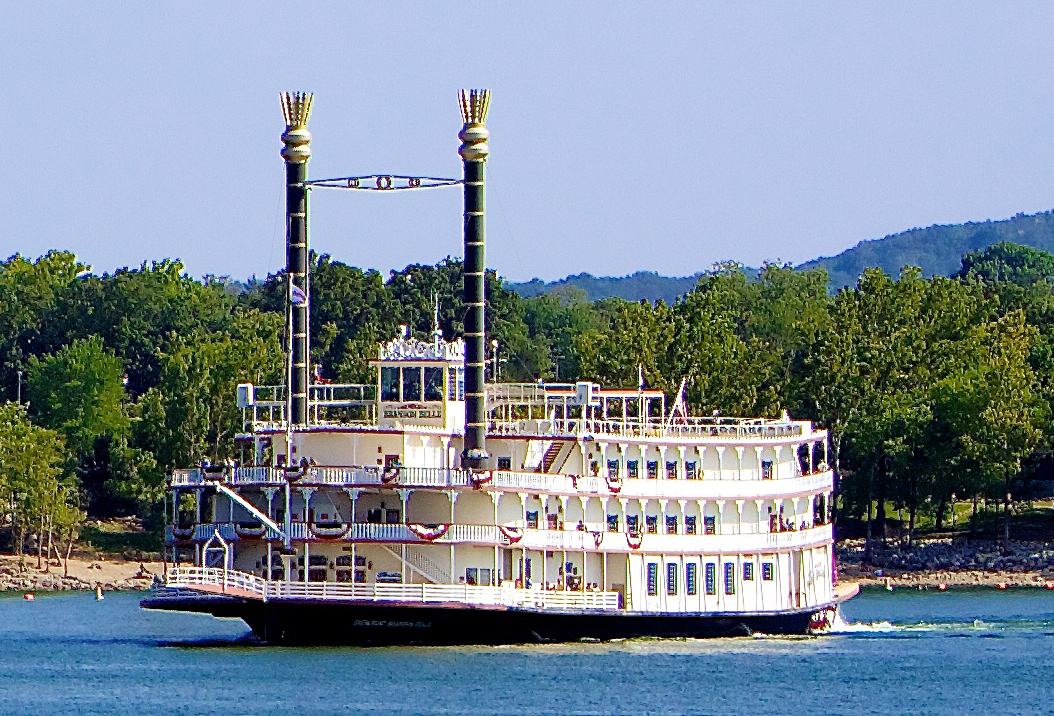
- Showboat Branson Belle on Table Rock Lake in 2012

History
- Owner: Herschend
- Launched: August 12, 1994 (31 years ago)
- Christened: April 13, 1995 (31 years ago)

General characteristics
- Type: Riverboat/showboat
- Tonnage: 1250 tons
- Length: 278 ft (85 m)
- Beam: 78 ft (24 m)
- Height: 112 ft (34 m) (to top of stacks)
- Draught: 7 ft (2.1 m)
- Installed power: 2 Detroit Diesel 16V92 (original) 3 Caterpillar C32 (repower)
- Propulsion: 2 twin electric driven rear paddle wheels, 16 ft (4.9 m) wide, 24 ft (7.3 m) in diameter
- Speed: 14 knots (26 km/h; 16 mph)
- Capacity: 700 passengers

Showboat Branson Belle is a riverboat—more specifically, a showboat—on Table Rock Lake near Branson, Missouri. The lake is landlocked by the Table Rock Dam on one side and the Beaver Lake Dam on the other side. Being a showboat, it hosts lunch and dinner shows throughout the year.

== Construction and launch ==
The boat was constructed at its port at White River Landing and was launched on August 12, 1994. The boat was launched into Table Rock Lake at a speed of 14 knots (26 km/h; 16 mph) on launching rails lubricated with two tons of bananas. The bananas were used for lubrication because they were biodegradable and would not have polluted Table Rock Lake as grease would have. The boat is claimed by its owner to be the largest ship on a landlocked lake in the United States.

== Incidents ==
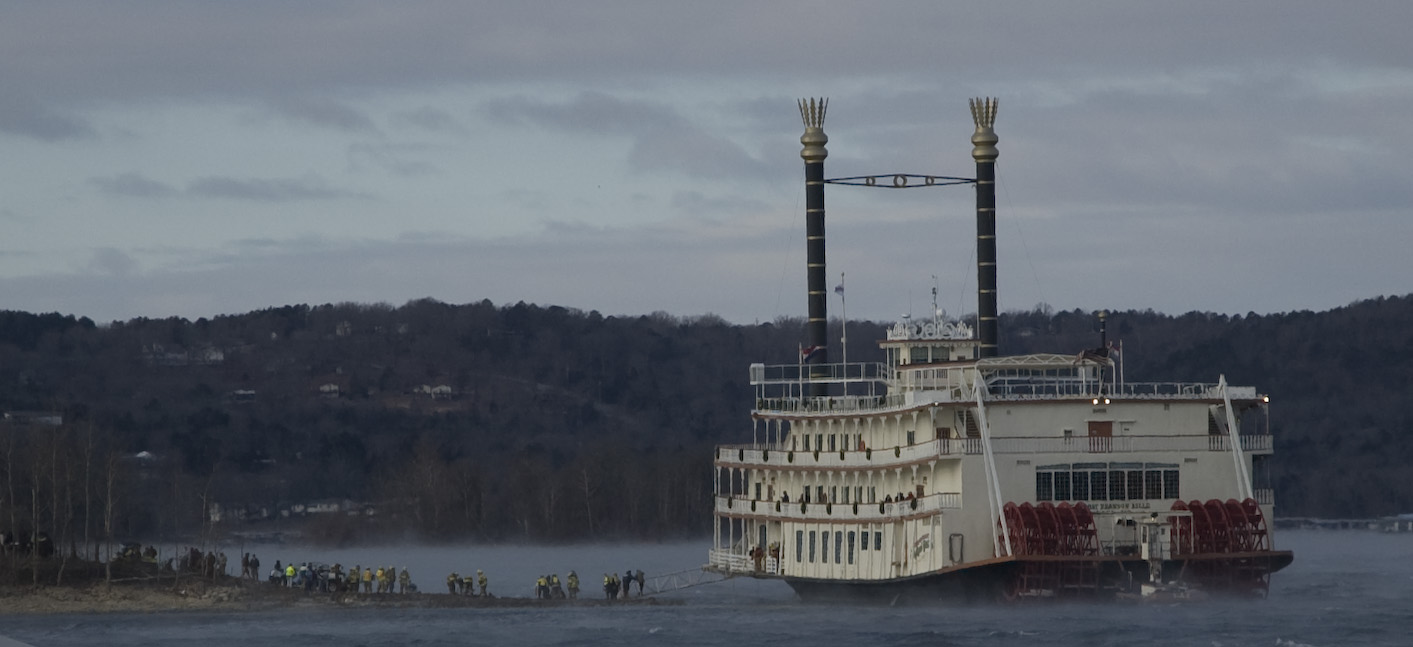
The Showboat Branson Belle, aground at Poverty Point, Table Rock Lake, December 12, 2010

On December 11, 2010, due to high winds that had come up suddenly, the Showboat Branson Belle ran aground while cruising on Table Rock Lake. The incident stranded 567 passengers and 76 crew members overnight.
