= Majestic (riverboat) =

Historic American riverboat, built 1923

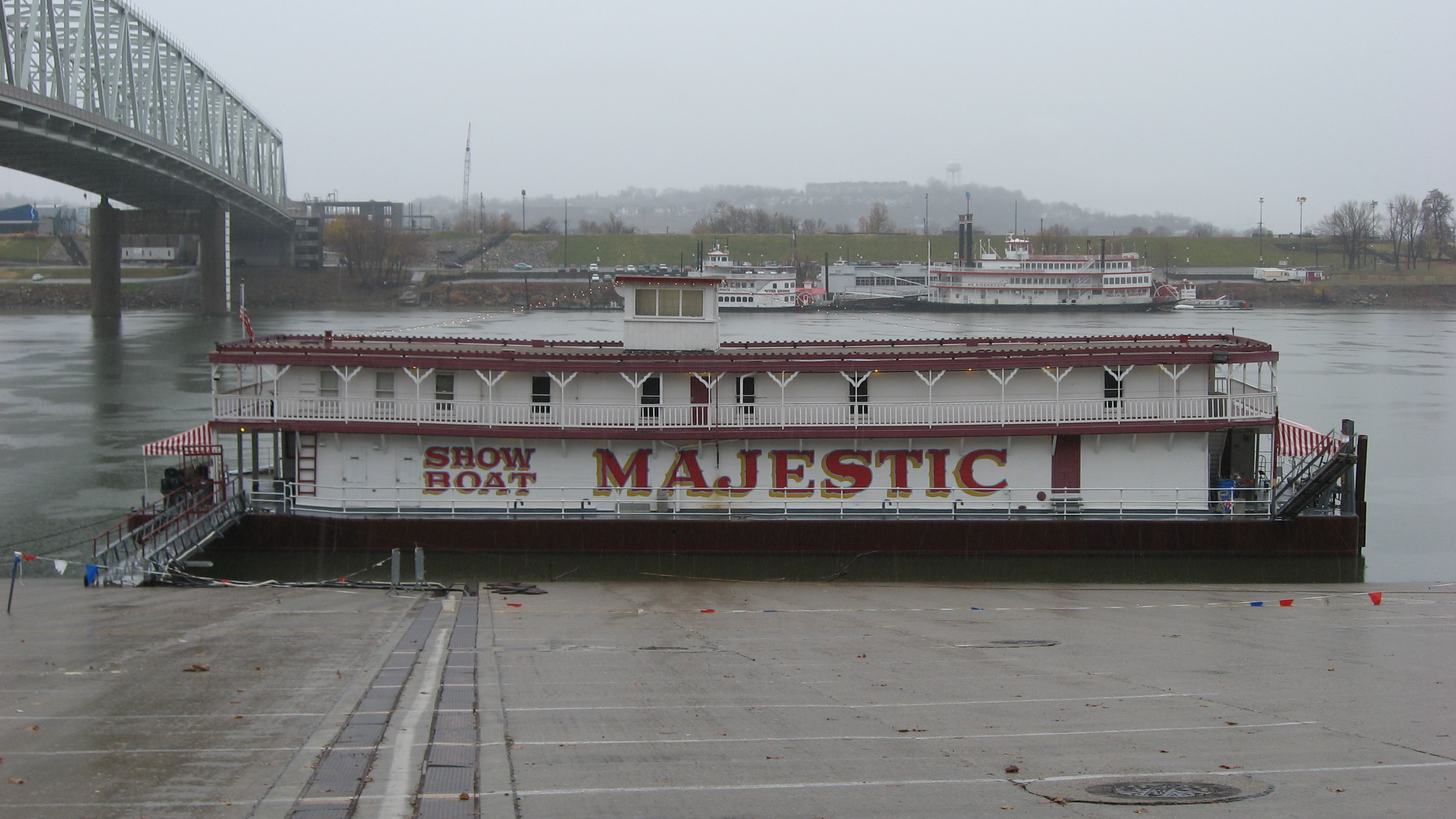
- Majestic moored at Cincinnati

History

United States
- Name: Majestic
- Owner: Joe Brumley
- Launched: 1923
- Acquired: 2019
- Status: Moored In Greenup, Kentucky

General characteristics
- Type: Showboat
- Draft: 12 in (300 mm)
- Propulsion: Diesel sternwheel towboat Attaboy
- Majestic (Showboat)
- U.S. National Register of Historic Places
- U.S. National Historic Landmark
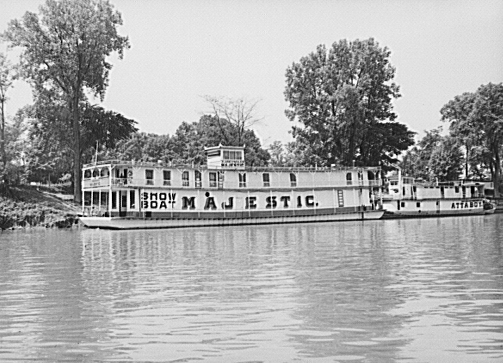
- Majestic and Attaboy on the Ohio River in 1943

- Location within Kentucky
- Location: Greenup, Kentucky
- Coordinates: 38°34′45″N 82°50′10″W
- Built: 1923
- Architect: Tom Reynolds
- NRHP reference No.: 80003085
- Added to NRHP: January 3, 1980; December 20, 1989

The Majestic is a historic riverboat that is moored on the Ohio River at Greenup, Kentucky. Built in 1923, she was the last floating theater to be built in the United States, and one of its longest-lived. She was declared a National Historic Landmark on December 20, 1989.

== Description ==
Majestic is moored on the Ohio River at Greenup, Kentucky. She is 135 feet (41 m) long, with a beam of 40 feet (12 m) and a draft depth of 1 foot (0.30 m). Her wooden hull has been sheathed inside a steel one, and is still visible from within the boat. Its superstructure housing the theater has been little altered since 1969.

== History ==
The last of the original traveling showboats, Majestic was built in 1923 in Pittsburgh, and plied the Ohio River and other portions of its watershed for many years, offering shows at towns along the way. The showboat was not necessarily a "ship" at all. It has no motor and no means of movement. Therefore, she came as a pair with a tugboat the Attaboy which towed her from venue to venue. Tom Reynolds and his family owned, lived on and ran it until 1959. Reynolds himself was born into an old established showboat family. Tom Reynolds first boat was the Illinois, lost to fire in 1916, which he replaced by building the America.

From 1945 to 1959 there was an academic alliance between the Reynolds family and Hiram College, Kent State University, and Indiana University that allowed the schools to present summer theater experiences for students on Majestic. In December 2014, longtime drama professor, Tom Weatherston, produced a documentary about the alliance and life on the showboat.

Capt. Tom Reynolds sold the Majestic in August 1959 for $30,000 to the Indiana University. He had piloted the Majestic on the Ohio, Kansas, Mississippi and Kanawha Rivers for 36 years. That December he was working on the tug Attaboy, moored alongside the Majestic, when it is thought the tug's engine kicked back, and Reynolds lost his footing and fell into the Kanawha River and drowned. He was 71 and had lived on or beside the river his whole life.

=== Drydocking in Cincinnati ===
She was forced into dry dock in 1965 by the Safety at Sea Act, which prohibited wooden-hulled vessels from transporting cast and crew on overnight journeys, though by that time the condition of her hull was fast deteriorating. The outer steel hull was added at that time, as were other modernizing conveniences, including air conditioning. While in dry dock, the City of Cincinnati purchased Majestic for $13,500 as part of its downtown Cincinnati Central Riverfront show case. She was docked at the Cincinnati Public Landing. The University of Cincinnati leased the showboat as a summer stock theater for its students until 1988. The showboat was cared for by the cast and crew of Cincinnati Landmark Productions, captained by Tim Perrino for 23 years, until March 2019.

=== Post Cincinnati Riverfront ===
She was purchased in a public auction for over $100K by Joe and Cortnee Brumley and on April 4, 2019, left drydock on the Cincinnati Riverfront to be pushed upstream to Manchester, Ohio to property the Brumley's purchased to develop into a tourist attraction, including using her as an Airbnb bed and breakfast.

==== Manchester ====
In April 2019, she arrived at her destination near the Moyer Winery in Manchester, Ohio

In December 2019, she was open to the public for public performing art events with the production of "The Majestic Christmas," her first public event since being acquired from the City of Cincinnati and being moved to Manchester, Ohio.

On December 11, 2020, The Ledger Independent reported that the owners were considering docking her in Maysville, Kentucky at Limestone Landing, a riverfront landing in a designated entertainment destination known as The Landing at Limestone quarter of Maysville, after discussions with Augusta, Kentucky broke down. In a special meeting of the city council on December 17, 2020, Maysville City Commissioners learned that Joe Brumley had acquired 100% ownership of the Majestic and had formed a 501 3c non-profit to operate the showboat but the board of directors had been dissolved. The city commission, although was in support of the move, deferred permitting and entering into a lease with Brumley until its non-profit status was resolved and the city knew who it was entering a lease with. Brumley was concerned that the showboat be moved as quickly as possible to prevent damage from Ohio River floods. The showboat was battered with debris during major flooding in early 2020. Brumley claimed that being moored in Manchester is not economically sustainable since the historic winery and tourist attraction, The Moyer Winery, burned down in 2019.

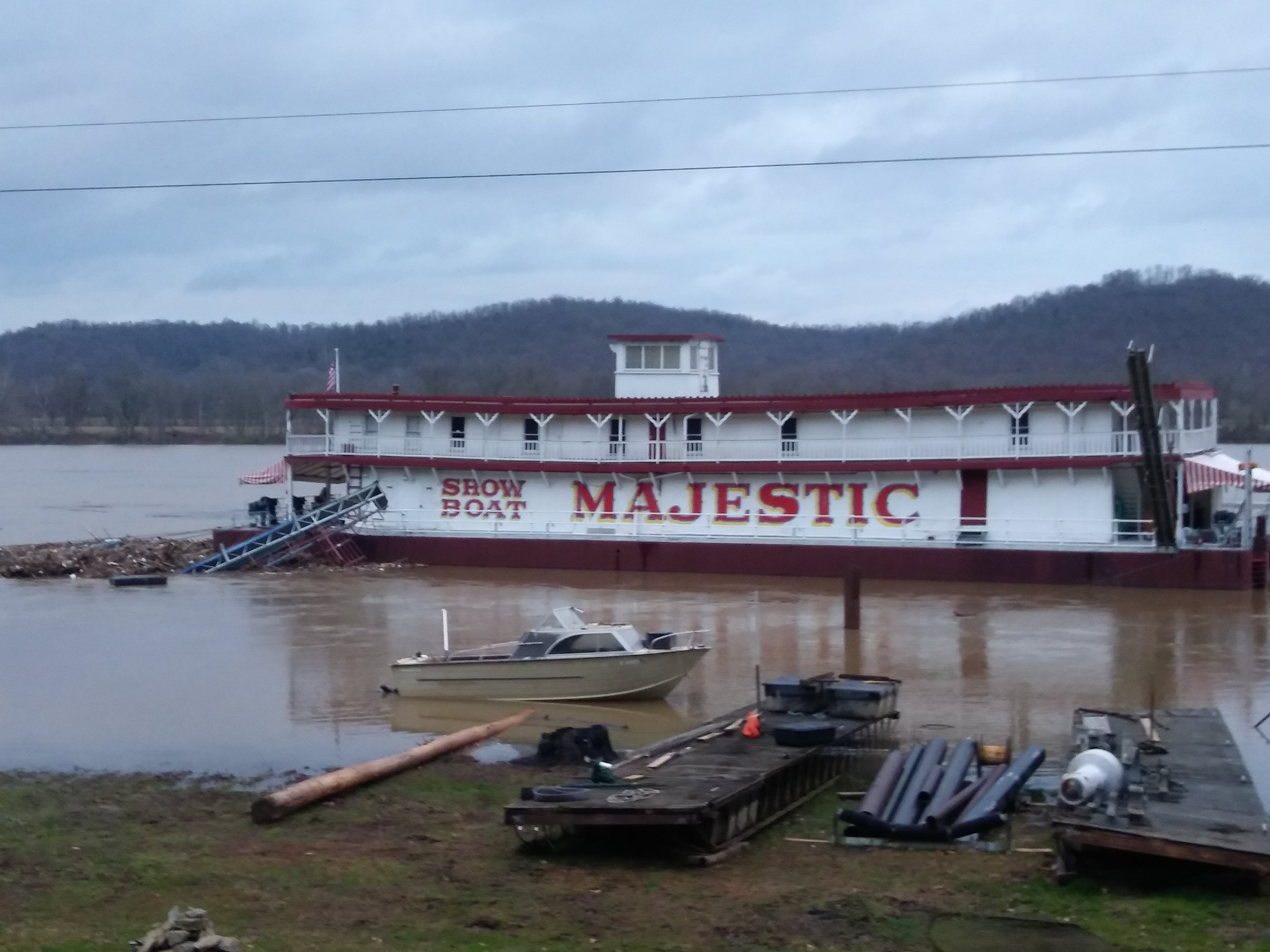
Flooding of the Ohio River on February 13, 2020, batters the Majestic

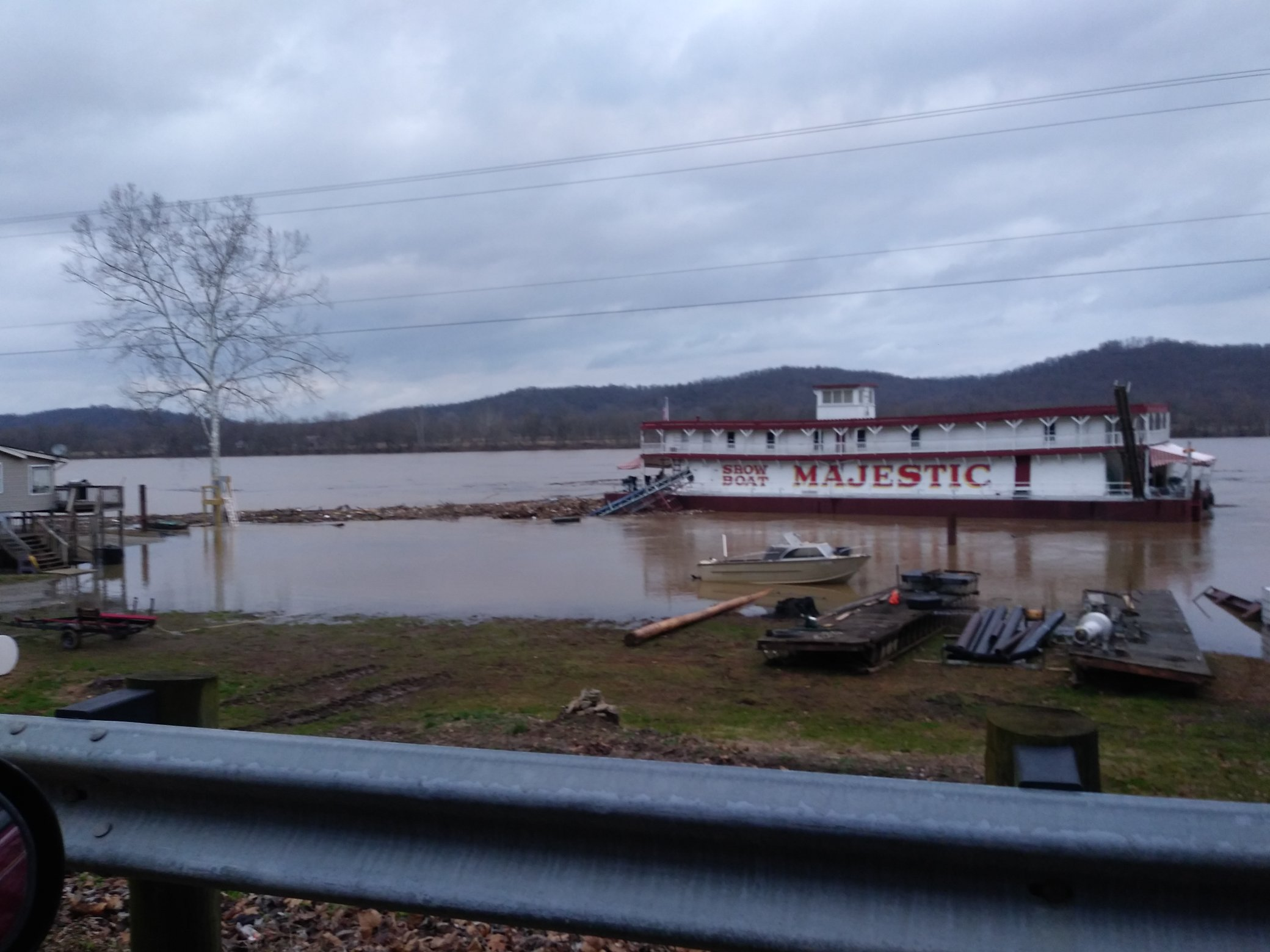
Flooding of the Ohio River on February 13, 2020, batters the Majestic

==== New Richmond ====
On February 11, 2021, multiple newspapers reported that New Richmond, Ohio's Village Administrator Greg Roberts said the New Richmond Village Council gave the go-ahead for the showboat to moor at its riverfront. Roberts said negotiations had taken less than a week after Brumley telephoned the village. The Ledger Independent reported that Maysville's officials were blindsided by the news, even though city officials had requested a salvage bond worth $2,000,000. On February 17, 2021, the Majestic left Manchester Ohio being pushed by the historic towboat Miss Anne, and arrived to its new dock in New Richmond, Ohio as part of the village's Designated Outdoor Refreshment Area (DORA), an economic tourist area where persons over 21 can possess and consume alcohol along the Ohio River.

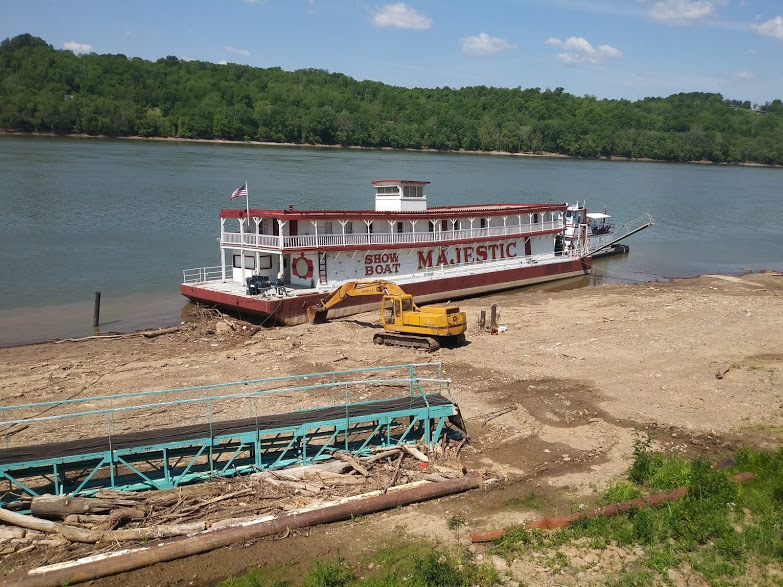
Showboat Majestic on the banks of the Ohio River in New Richmond, Ohio

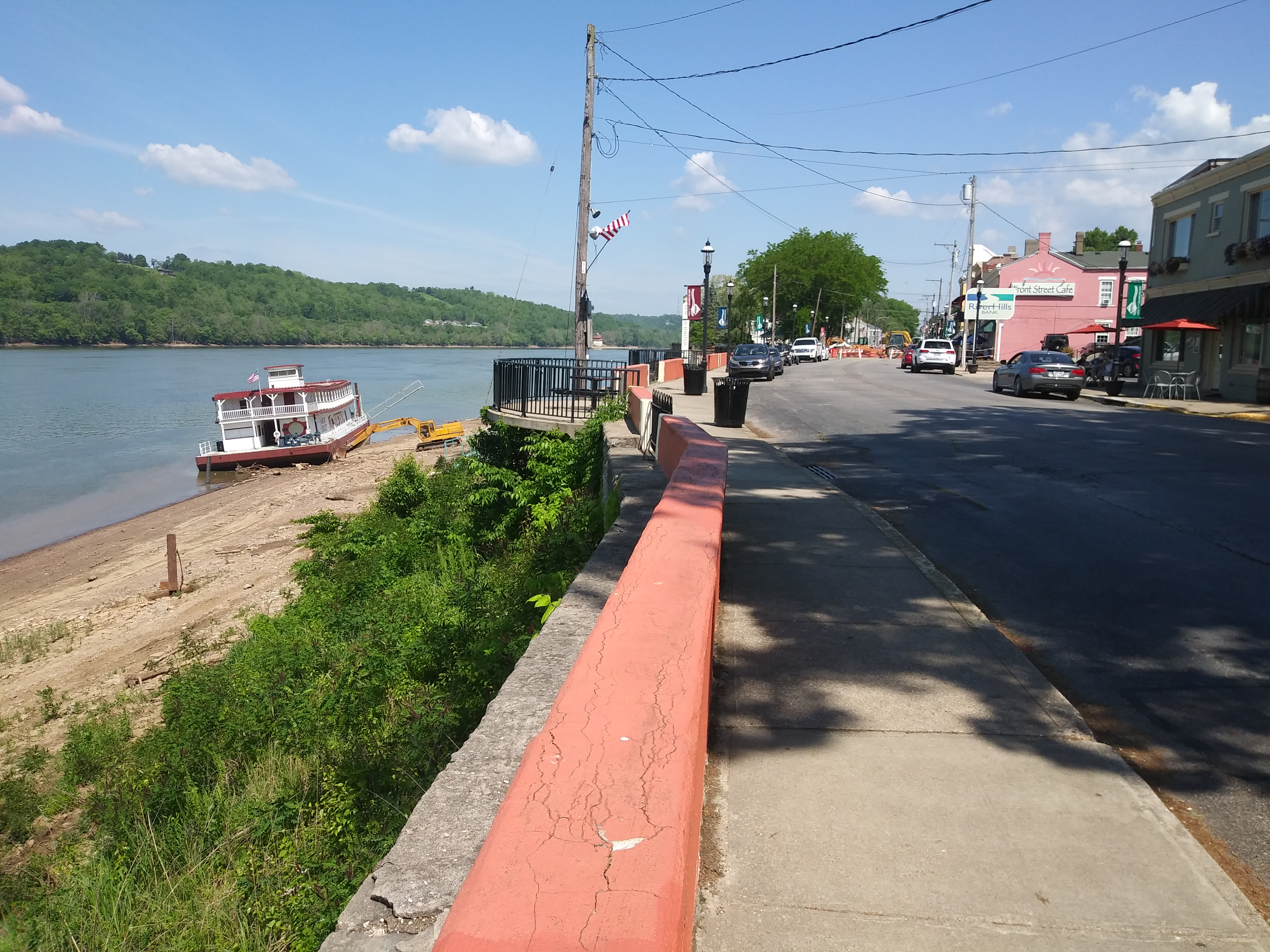
Showboat Majestic on the banks of the Ohio River in New Richmond, Ohio at the intersection of Johnston Alley and Front Street, while it awaits construction of its dock. In the image is New Richmond's Designated Outdoor Refreshment Area (DORA), an economic tourist area where persons over 21 can possess and consume alcohol along the Ohio River.

On June 28, 2022, the New Richmond Village Council voted to revoke owner Joe Brumley's license to moor her at New Richmond and gave Brumley 90 days to have her removed, citing lack of progress in Brumley's development of the showboat's riverfront attraction. According to The Waterways Journal Weekly, the city revolked the license due to environmental concerns and lack of insurance on the showboat.

==== Post New Richmond ====
In September 2022, the showboat left New Richmond and was pushed up the Ohio River back to Manchester, Ohio where it is banked near the Moyer Winery.

In January 2023, it was reported by The Ledger Independent that the showboat was moored along the Ohio River in an area along Maysville's west end. City officials said they had no desire to have the showboat moored in Maysville and was told she was on her way to Vicksburg, Mississippi.

The showboat was moved to Greenup, Kentucky in November 2024 and is currently moored next to property owned by Brumley.

== See also ==
- List of National Historic Landmarks in Ohio
