= Julie Dozier =

Book character

Julie Dozier is a character in Edna Ferber's 1926 novel Show Boat. In the Jerome Kern and Oscar Hammerstein II's classic musical version of it, which opened on Broadway on December 27, 1927, her stage name (or alias) is Julie La Verne. She is exposed as Julie Dozier in Act I. In Act II, Julie has changed her name, this time to Julie Wendel.

Julie is married to Steve Baker, and both are actors on the show boat Cotton Blossom. However, they harbor a secret - Julie is part African-American, and Steve is white; therefore, according to the laws of the time, their marriage is illegal. They are an exceptionally close couple, and Steve is fiercely protective of her. Julie is also a close friend and surrogate mother figure to ten-year-old Magnolia Hawks, daughter of Cap'n Andy Hawks, the show boat's owner. Andy is married to the shrewish Parthy Ann, who has disdain for all actors, especially Julie.

== Character history ==
When Pete, a coarse engineer who works on the boat, makes unwanted advances toward Julie, Steve engages him in a fistfight. Pete knows that Julie is mixed and Steve white so he goes to the local sheriff and exposes the couple. Before the sheriff arrives, however, Steve takes out a pocket knife in front of the troupe, makes a cut on Julie's hand, and sucks some of her blood, so that he can truthfully claim that he has mixed blood in him. Nevertheless, the couple is obliged to leave the show boat because law at the time made it illegal for African-Americans to act on the stage with whites. After some years have past, Magnolia, now eighteen, becomes the new leading lady on the showboat. Many years after, just before being deserted in Chicago by her gambler husband Gaylord Ravenal, Magnolia accidentally discovers that Julie now works in a whorehouse. Julie is mortified by this turn of events. Author Ferber never reveals why Julie has become a prostitute, or what happened to her husband Steve.

Show Boat's Julie is perhaps the first truly tragic character depicted in a musical. Most of what happens to her in the novel remains exactly the same in the show—she is still a biracial woman who is married to a white man and is forced to leave the show because of racist laws, an element once considered taboo in a musical play. There are, however, some major changes to her story in the musical:

- The scenes with Julie on the show boat occur when Magnolia, Julie's best friend in the musical, is eighteen rather than still a child, and Magnolia becomes the troupe's leading lady immediately after Julie and Steve are forced to leave the boat.
- Years later, Julie, rather than becoming a prostitute, becomes an alcoholic nightclub singer, despondent because Steve has ultimately left her. Magnolia, who has been abandoned by Ravenal, winds up auditioning at the same nightclub, without knowing that Julie is the featured singer. Julie, backstage, overhears the audition and deliberately (and secretly) quits her job so that Magnolia can have it. Magnolia goes on to become a great star, never learning of Julie's sacrifice. The ultimate fate of Julie remains a mystery, as in the novel, but Miles Kreuger, the musical theatre historian, has stated in the accompanying booklet to the 1988 EMI complete recording of Show Boat 's score that he believes that Julie's sacrifice probably will ultimately lead to her death (presumably from drinking).

In the musical, the character of Julie is given two of Show Boat's most memorable songs, Can't Help Lovin' Dat Man and Bill.

== Portrayals ==
In the show's original production, Julie was played by Helen Morgan, who made the role her own until her untimely death and reprised it in the 1932 stage revival, the 1936 film version of the show, and a 1940 Los Angeles revival. In the 1946 stage revival, the first U.S. revival after Morgan's death, Julie was played by Carol Bruce. In the 1951 Technicolor remake of "Show Boat", Julie was played by Ava Gardner, with her singing voice dubbed by Annette Warren. She was also given an additional scene in this version, in which she meets Ravenal a few years after he has deserted Magnolia and shames him into returning to her. (In the play and 1936 film, she is not seen again after she resigns from the nightclub.)

In the 1929 part-talkie film version of Show Boat, based on the novel rather than the musical, Julie, played by Alma Rubens, was not biracial. In this version, Parthy orders her and Steve to leave the boat out of jealousy over Magnolia's affection for Julie. Later in the film Julie becomes not a mere prostitute in a whorehouse as in the novel, but the actual whorehouse madam. In the musical prologue to the 1929 film, made with sound, Helen Morgan was filmed singing Julie's two songs from the musical, Can't Help Lovin' Dat Man and Bill.

While the usual custom in the past was to have a white actress play the role, it is now far more common to cast a biracial actress, despite the fact that the audience watching Show Boat is supposedly unaware that Julie is biracial until the sheriff reveals it. The first biracial actress to play Julie was Cleo Laine, in the 1971 London revival of the show. More recently, Lonette McKee portrayed Julie in Harold Prince's 1993 revival of the musical, as well as in the 1983 revival for which she earned a Tony Award nomination.

Lena Horne briefly appeared as Julie in the Show Boat sequence in the Jerome Kern biopic Till the Clouds Roll By, in 1946, but MGM was reluctant to cast her in a true film version of the show because they feared that audiences would not welcome a black actress playing a romantic role in a film featuring both blacks and whites, so they gave the role to Gardner in the 1951 film Show Boat.
