= A Harp in Hock =

1927 film

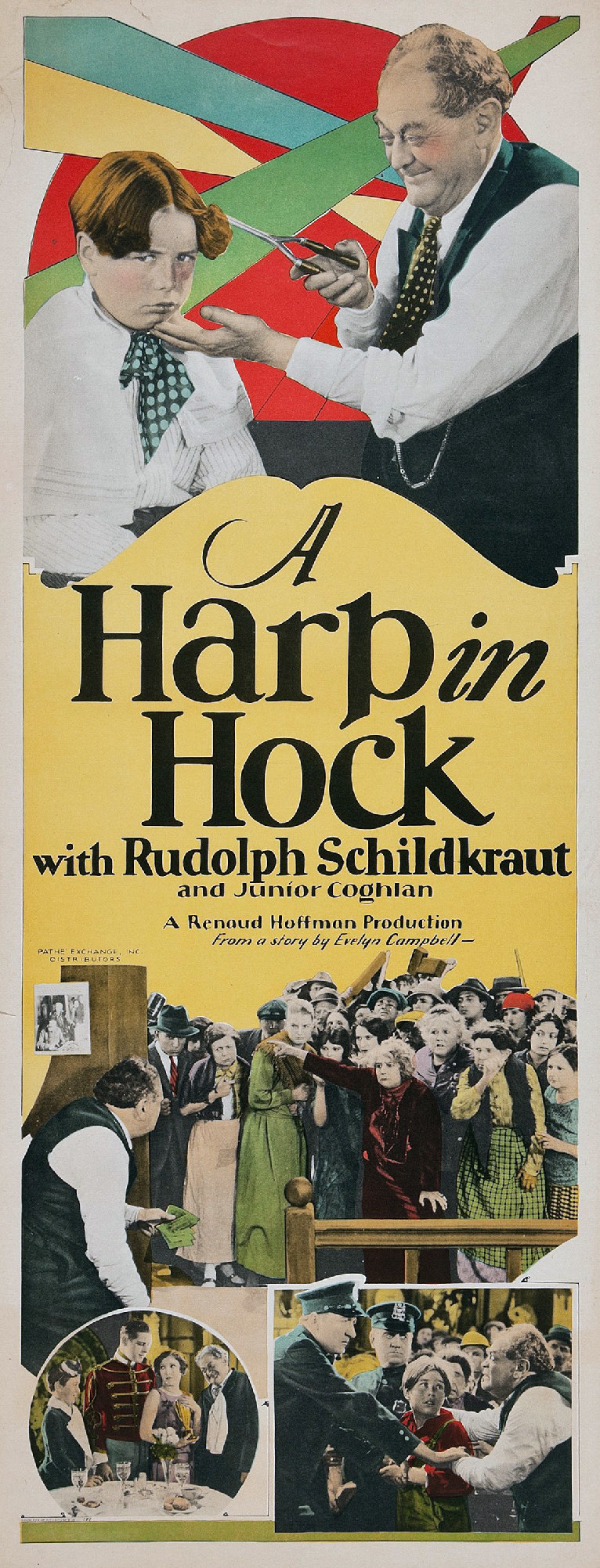
- Film poster
- Directed by: Renaud Hoffman; Glenn Belt (ass't director)
- Written by: Sonya Levien (scenario)
- Based on: "A Harp in Hock" (story) by Evelyn Campbell
- Produced by: DeMille Pictures
- Starring: Rudolph Schildkraut; Junior Coghlan; May Robson; Bessie Love
- Cinematography: Dewey Wrigley
- Edited by: W. Donn Hayes
- Production company: DeMille Pictures
- Distributed by: Pathé Exchange
- Release date: October 10, 1927 (U.S.)
- Running time: 6 reels; 5,995 feet
- Country: United States
- Language: Silent (English intertitles)

A Harp in Hock, also known as The Samaritan, is a lost 1927 American silent melodrama film directed by Renaud Hoffman, produced by DeMille Pictures, and distributed by Pathé Exchange. The film starred Rudolph Schildkraut, Junior Coghlan, May Robson, and Bessie Love, and was based on the short story by Evelyn Campbell.

== Plot ==
In New York City, pawnbroker Isaac Abrams must take in an orphaned immigrant boy, Tommy, after his mother dies. Tommy helps at the pawn shop and goes to school, but after a fight with a bully, the bully's mother, Mrs. Banks, reports him to the authorities and has him sent to an orphanage.

Tommy escapes and returns to New York, where he upsets Mrs. Banks and a riot breaks out, but Abrams then adopts Tommy.

== Cast ==
- Rudolph Schildkraut as Isaac Abrams
- Junior Coghlan as Tommy Shannon
- May Robson as Mrs. Banks
- Bessie Love as Nora Banks
- Louis Natheaux as Nick
- Elise Bartlett as Mrs. Shannon
- Mrs. Charles Mack as The Clock Woman
- Joseph Striker as Dr. Franz Mueller
- Adele Watson as Investigator
- Lillian Harmer as Sourface
- Clarence Burton as Plainclothesman
- Bobby Heck as Snipe Banks

== Reception ==
The film received positive reviews, particularly the performances of Schildkraut and Coghlan.
