= Clinton, Iowa Riverfront =

Riverfront in Clinton, Iowa, U.S.

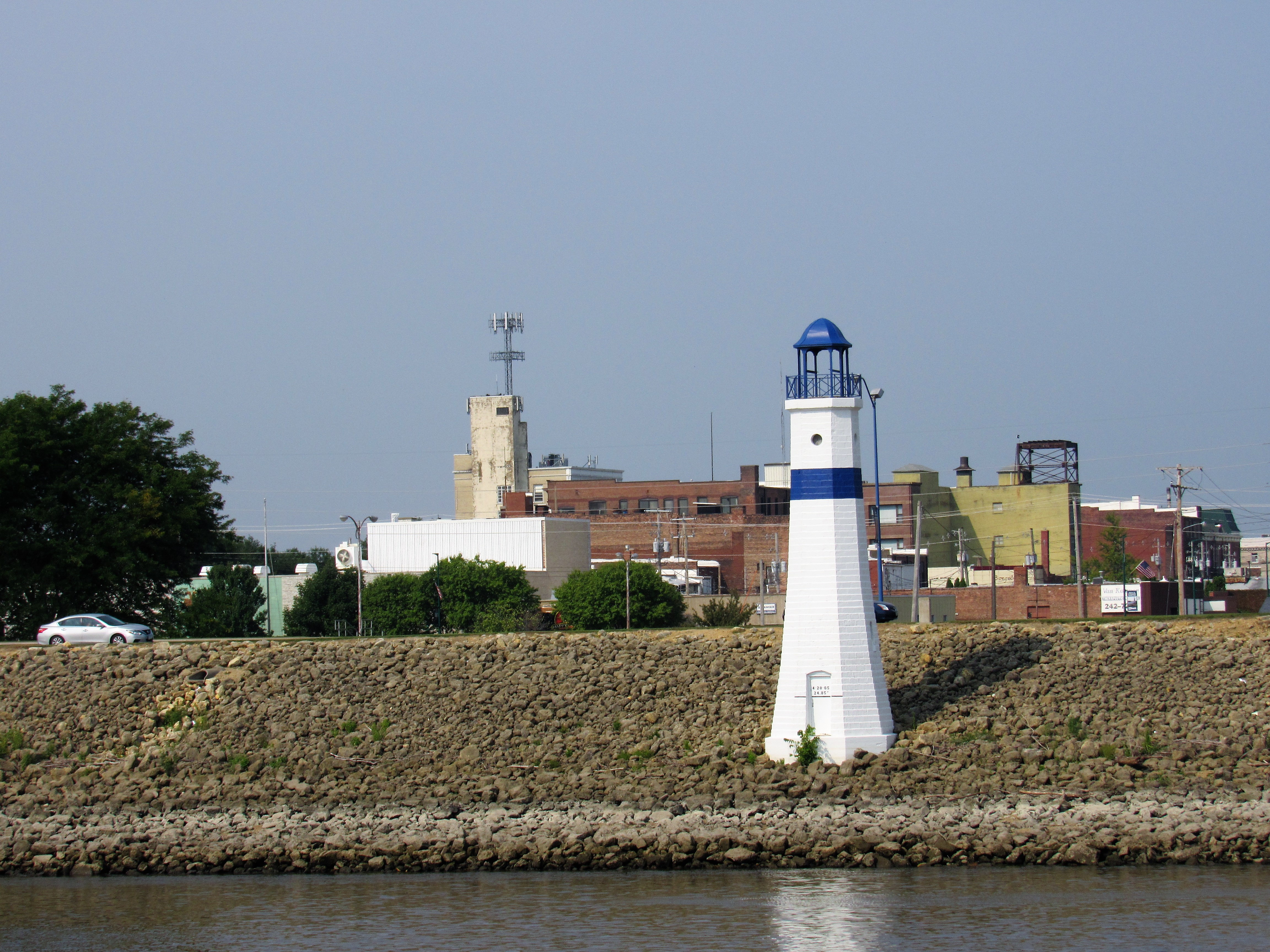
The riverfront in 2018.

The Clinton, Iowa Riverfront, (also known as The Dike by Clintonians) is an area by the Mississippi River in Clinton, Iowa, United States, The riverfront is home to one of Clinton's main attractions the Clinton Area Showboat Theatre. There is a band shell with tennis courts, a child-friendly park, restaurants, an aquatic center, and skate park.

The Riverfront was built as a solution from the result of a 1965 flood that flooded half of Clinton. Damages were estimated to be five million dollars. It has protected Clinton from further damage since.

In 2005, the City of Clinton updated the existing dike, with parks, recreation, and riverside views using the five million dollars in an Iowa Great Places Destination grant.

== Clinton Showboat Theatre ==
The Clinton Area Showboat Theatre was built in 1935 on a working boat converted into a showboat. The city of Clinton bought it in 1966. The boat uses 25-75 tons of coal each day.

== NelsonCorp Field ==
NelsonCorp Field is a baseball stadium which is home field for the Clinton LumberKings, a collegiate summer baseball team in the Prospect League.

== Discovery Trail ==
The Discovery Trail is a 4.8 mile trail along the riverfront, dedicated to three Clinton county astronauts. It is open all year round and all hours of the day, and is free.
