= Joseph Schildkraut =

Austrian-American actor (1896–1964)

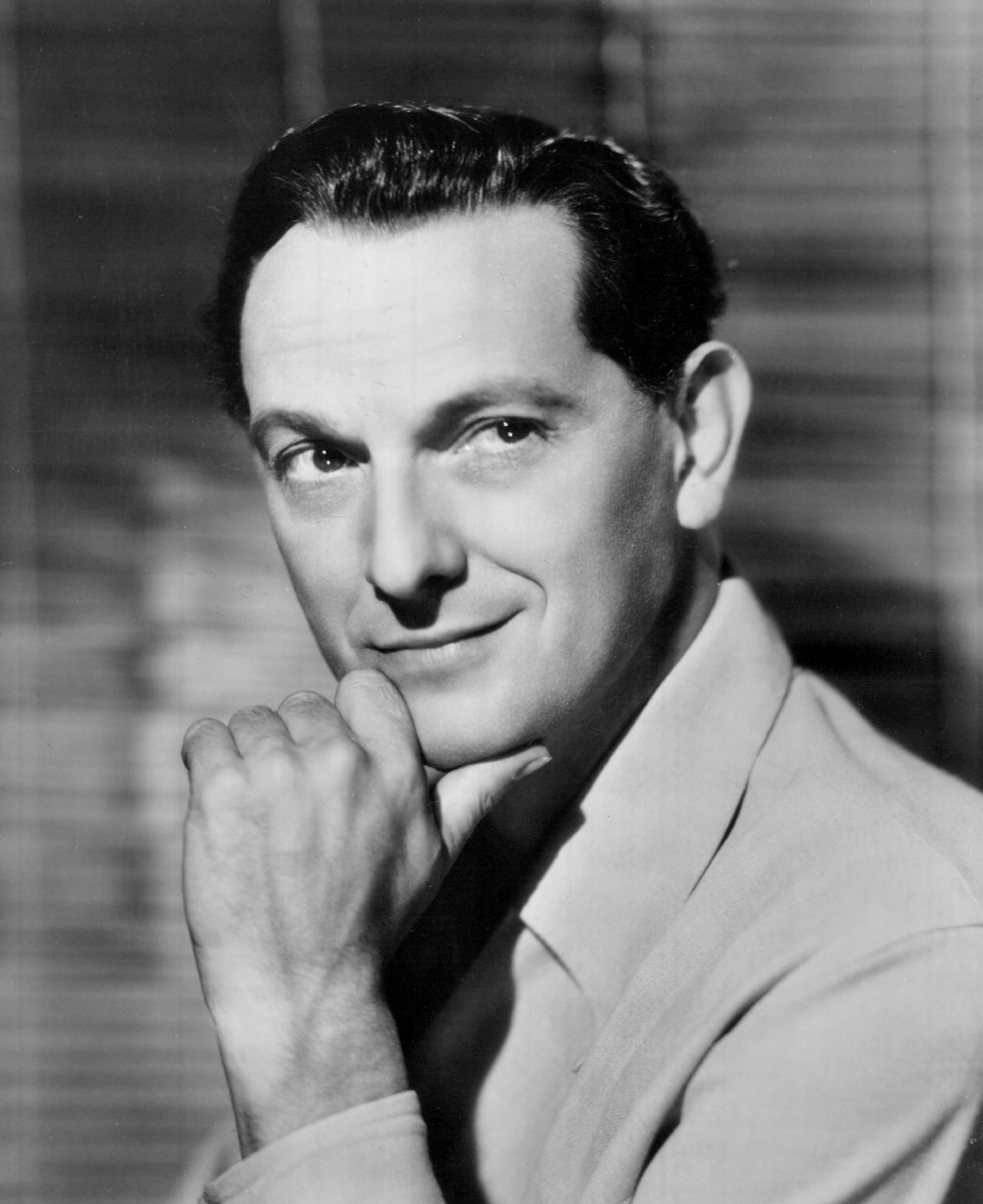
- Schildkraut, 1953
- Born: 22 March 1896; Vienna, Austria-Hungary (now Austria)
- Died: 21 January 1964 (aged 67); New York City, U.S.
- Burial place: Hollywood Forever Cemetery
- Occupation: Actor
- Years active: 1915–1964
- Spouses: Elise Bartlett (m. 1923; div. 1930) Marie McKay (m. 1932; died 1962) Leonora Rogers (m. 1963)
- Father: Rudolph Schildkraut

Joseph Schildkraut (22 March 1896 – 21 January 1964) was an Austrian-American actor. He won an Oscar for his performance as Captain Alfred Dreyfus in the film The Life of Emile Zola (1937). He was nominated for a Golden Globe for his performance as Otto Frank in the film The Diary of Anne Frank (1959) and a Primetime Emmy for his performance as Rabbi Gottlieb in a 1962 episode of the television series Sam Benedict.

== Early life ==
Schildkraut was born in Vienna, Austria, the son of Erna (née Weinstein) and stage (and later motion picture) actor Rudolph Schildkraut. His family was Jewish.

In 1910, he accompanied his father on his tour to the U.S. and returned to Europe in 1913. He began stage training with Max Reinhardt in Berlin shortly afterward, began his career on the stages of Germany and Austria, then made the transition to film. Schildkraut moved to the U.S. in 1920 and appeared in many Broadway productions. Among the plays in which he starred was a notable production of Peer Gynt.

== Career ==
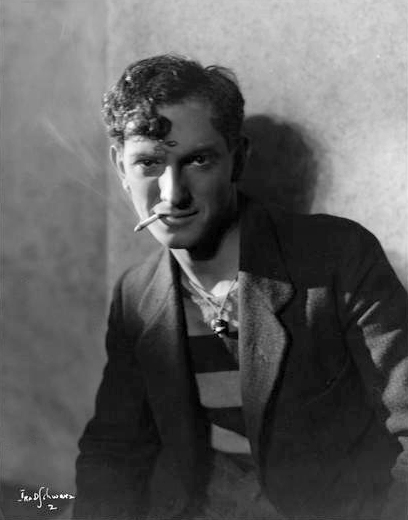
Schildkraut in 1921

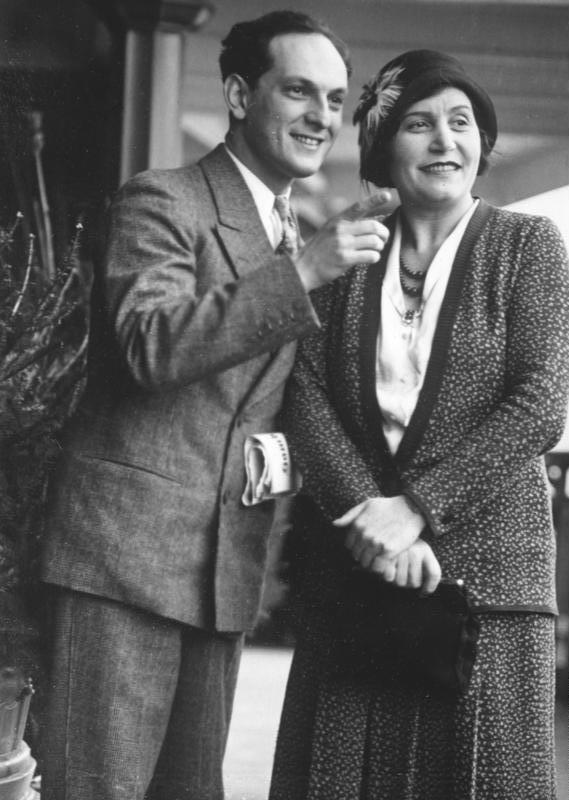
Schildkraut with opera singer Maria Olszewska, 1932

In 1921, Schildkraut played the title role in the first American stage production of Ferenc Molnár's Liliom, the play that eventually became the basis for Rodgers and Hammerstein's Carousel. He then began working in silent movies, but he returned to the stage occasionally. He had early success in film as the Chevalier de Vaudrey in D.W. Griffith's Orphans of the Storm with Lillian Gish. Later, he was featured in Cecil B. DeMille's epic 1927 film The King of Kings as Judas Iscariot. Schildraut's father Rudolf also appeared in the film. Joseph Schildkraut also played a Viennese-accented, non-singing Gaylord Ravenal in the 1929 part-talkie film version of Edna Ferber's Show Boat. The character as written in the 1929 film was much closer to Ferber's original than to the depiction of him in the classic Kern and Hammerstein musical play based on the novel as well as the 1936 and 1951 film versions of the musical, but the 1929 film was not a critical or box-office success.

Schildkraut received an Academy Award for Best Supporting Actor for his role as Alfred Dreyfus in The Life of Emile Zola (1937). Additional accolades came for playing the ambitious duc d'Orléans in the historical epic Marie Antoinette (1938), and he gave a notable performance as the villainous Nicolas Fouquet in The Man in the Iron Mask (1939).

Schildkraut is perhaps best remembered today for playing the role of Otto Frank in both the original stage production and film version of The Diary of Anne Frank (1959). Noticeably, he plays the villain in Ernst Lubitsch's The Shop Around the Corner (1940). He was also an active character actor and appeared in guest roles on several early television shows, including the Hallmark Hall of Fame, in which he played Claudius in the 1953 television production of Hamlet, with Maurice Evans in the title role. Schildkraut also hosted and starred in Joseph Schildkraut Presents, a short-lived series on the DuMont Television Network from October 1953 to January 1954.

In 1961, during the third season of The Twilight Zone, he made his first appearance on "Deaths-Head Revisited". He later played an elderly man in "The Trade-Ins" in season 3, episode 31 of the same show. In 1963, he was nominated for a Best Actor Emmy Award for his performance in a guest-starring role on Sam Benedict.

== Personal life ==
Schildkraut was married three times. His first marriage was to actress Elise Bartlett in 1923; they divorced in 1931. He was married to Mary McKay from 1932 until her death on February 17, 1962. In 1956, he was involved with Patricia Bosworth, who recalls that he was known informally as "Pepi." In 1963, Schildkraut married Leonora Rogers, who survived him.

For his contributions to the motion picture industry, Schildkraut has a star on the Hollywood Walk of Fame at 6780 Hollywood Boulevard. He is interred in the Hollywood Forever Cemetery.

== Death ==
Schildkraut died at his home in New York City of a heart attack. His father had died at the age of 68, also of a heart attack.

== Filmography ==
- Dämon und Mensch (1915)
- Das Wiegenlied (1916)
- Für den Ruhm des Geliebten (1916) as Musiker Rolf
- Seine Durchlaucht der Landstreicher (1919)
- Die schwarze Fahne (1919)
- Der Roman der Komtesse Ruth (1920)
- Theodor Herzl (1921) as Das leidende Israel
- Orphans of the Storm (1921) as Chevalier de Vaudrey
- The Song of Love (1923) as Raymon Valverde
- The Road to Yesterday (1925) as Kenneth Paulton
- Shipwrecked (1926) as Larry O'Neil
- Meet the Prince (1926) as Prince Nicholas
- Young April (1926) as Prince Caryl
- The King of Kings (1927) as Judas Iscariot
- The Heart Thief (1927) as Paul Kurt
- His Dog (1927) as Peter Olsen
- The Forbidden Woman (1927) as Jean La Coste
- The Blue Danube (1928) as Ludwig
- Tenth Avenue (1928) as Joe Ross
- Show Boat (1929) as Gaylord Ravenal
- The Mississippi Gambler (1929) as Jack Morgan
- Night Ride (1930) as Joe Rooker
- Cock o' the Walk (1930) as Carlos Lopez
- Carnival (1931) as Count Andreas Scipio
- The Blue Danube (1932) as Sandor
- Viva Villa! (1934) as Gen. Pascal
- Sisters Under the Skin (1934) as Zukowski
- Cleopatra (1934) as Herod
- The Crusades (1935) as Conrad - Marquis of Montferrat
- The Garden of Allah (1936) as Batouch
- Slave Ship (1937) as Danelo
- Souls at Sea (1937) as Gaston de Bastonet
- The Life of Emile Zola (1937) as Capt. Alfred Dreyfus
- Lancer Spy (1937) as Prince Ferdi Zu Schwarzwald
- Lady Behave! (1937) as Michael Andrews
- The Baroness and the Butler (1938) as Baron Georg Marissey
- Marie Antoinette (1938) as duc d’Orleans
- Suez (1938) as Vicomte Rene De Latour
- Idiot's Delight (1939) as Captain Kirvline
- The Three Musketeers (1939) as King Louis XIII
- The Man in the Iron Mask (1939) as Fouquet
- Mr. Moto Takes a Vacation (1939) as Hendrik Manderson
- Lady of the Tropics (1939) as Pierre Delaroch
- The Rains Came (1939) as Mr. Bannerjee
- Pack Up Your Troubles (1939) as Hugo Ludwig
- Phantom Raiders (1940) as Al Taurez
- Rangers of Fortune (1940) as Col. Lewis Rebstock
- The Shop Around the Corner (1940) as Ferencz Vadas
- Meet the Wildcat (1940) as Leon Dumeray
- The Parson of Panamint (1941) as Bob Deming
- The Tell-Tale Heart (1941, short) as Young Man
- Flame of Barbary Coast (1945) as Tito Morell
- The Cheaters (1945) as Anthony 'Mr. M.' Marchand
- Monsieur Beaucaire (1946) as Don Francisco
- Plainsman and the Lady (1946) as Peter Marquette
- Northwest Outpost (1947) as Count Igor Savin
- Old Los Angeles (1948) as Luis Savarin
- The Gallant Legion (1948) as Sen. Clarke Faulkner
- Hamlet (1953, TV) as King Claudius
- The Diary of Anne Frank (1959) as Otto Frank
- The Big Bankroll (1961) as Abraham Rothstein
- Dr. Kildare (TV series), Episode: The Stepping Stone as Max Keller
- The Twilight Zone, Episode: Deaths-Head Revisited (1961, TV) as Alfred Becker
- The Twilight Zone, Episode: The Trade-Ins (1962, TV) as John Holt
- The Greatest Story Ever Told (1965) as Nicodemus (posthumous release)

== See also ==
- List of German-speaking Academy Award winners and nominees
- List of actors with Academy Award nominations
