= The Angel of Broadway =

1927 film

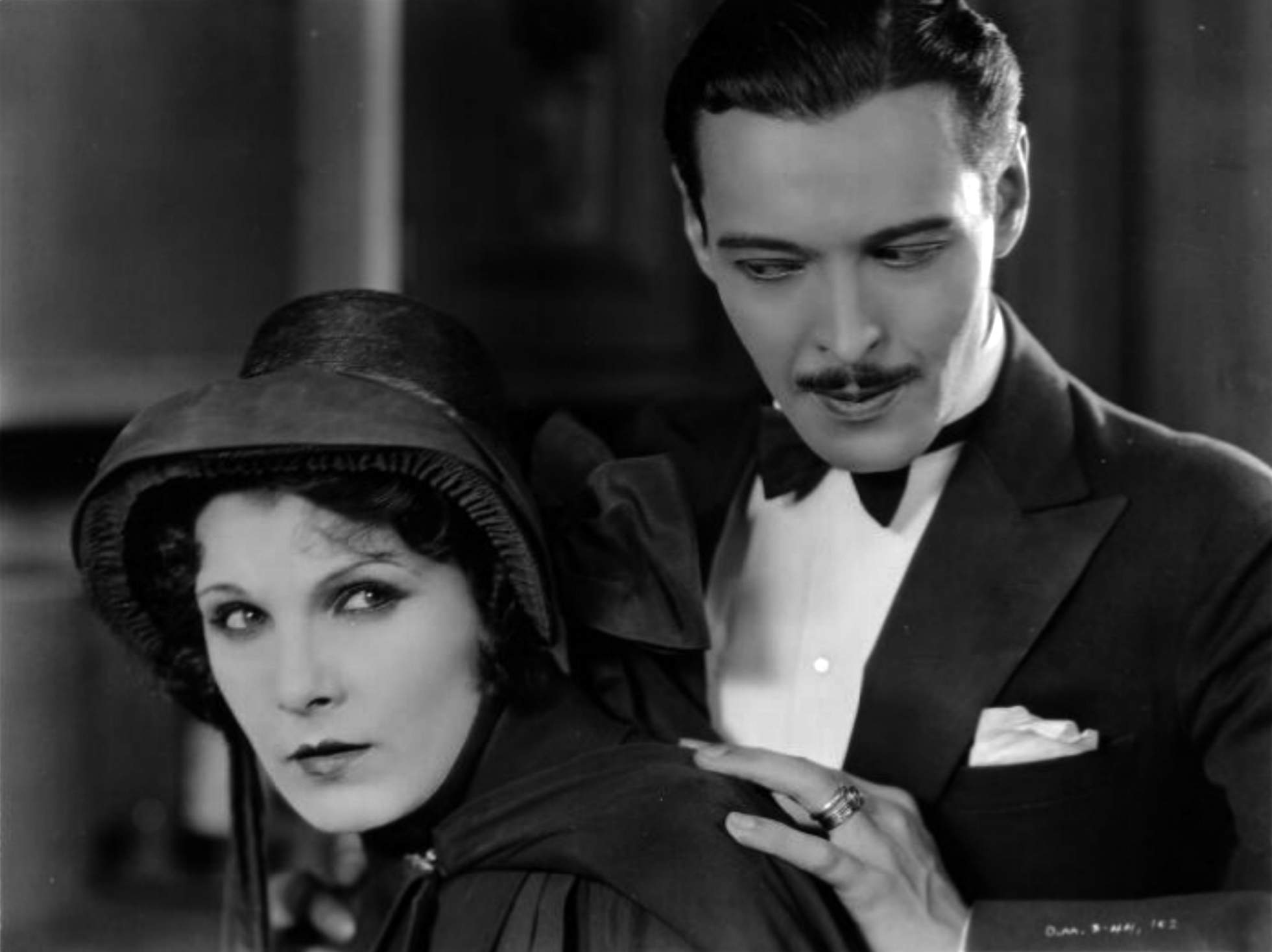
- Film still
- Directed by: Lois Weber
- Written by: John W. Krafft (intertitles)
- Screenplay by: Lenore J. Coffee
- Story by: Lenore J. Coffee
- Produced by: Cecil B. DeMille
- Starring: Leatrice Joy
- Cinematography: Arthur C. Miller
- Edited by: Harold McLernon
- Distributed by: Pathé Exchange
- Release date: October 3, 1927 (United States)
- Running time: 7 reels
- Country: United States
- Language: Silent (English intertitles)

The Angel of Broadway is a 1927 American silent drama film produced by Cecil B. DeMille and distributed by Pathé Exchange. It was directed by Lois Weber and starred Leatrice Joy.

== Plot ==
As stated in the copyright submission for the film, Babe Scott, a pretty cabaret entertainer, is constantly in search of sensational material for new numbers calculated to shock the patrons of her night club. She conceives the idea of burlesquing a Salvation Army lassie, and attends mission meetings on the East Side for atmosphere. There she strikes up an acquaintance with Jerry Wilson, a good natured and honest truck-driver who does not suspect the purpose of her visits. The act goes over big. The patrons go wild over it and Herman, a wealthy habitue of the night club, promises Babe an elaborate party in her honor any tine she will accompany him. Meanwhile, Jerry wonders why Babe does not return to the Mission. Gertie, a little streetwalker with whom he has been friendly, pleads with him to come back to her, but he refuses, and she threatens to drink poison. Babe is sorely disappointed to catch Lonnie, the song-plugger of the night club, who has been making love to her, stealing part of her money. Later she finds him making overtures to Big Bertha, the hard-boiled, middle-aged hostess of the club. One night, Babe notices that the hymn which she sings to open her Salvation Sal act, so touches a young girl present that she asks her escort to take her home. Babe realizes the bad taste of the act, and hurries off without completing it. She tries to buck up her nerves with a drink and a smoke, but the incident has gotten to her, and she begs Big Bertha to let her change the act. However, Bertha will not hear of it as the Salvation Sal act has been too big a hit. Babe goes out for a walk, and stops to hear Captain Mary hold a Salvation Army meeting. Jerry sees her and follows her back to night club. He has difficulty getting in and, by the time he does, Babe's Salvation Sal act is on. He is horrified and follows her to her dressing room. She is nervous and tries to pass the situation off lightly by offering him a drink. She is astonished when he accepts it and says he just hung around the Salvation Army to meet her. She turns on him and furiously accuses him of having deceived her. He replies by asking her if she has not done the same thing to him. Then his anger gets the better of him and he tears the Salvation Army bonnet from her head, and, declaring her unfit to wear the uniform, begins to choke her. Stopping, he laughs sardonically at his own anger over such a cheap trick as Babe's act and tells her that he is going back to Gertie. Babe is dazed and heartbroken. She has lost both Lonnie and Jerry and her night club act is slipping. She decides to accept Herman's invitation and they start off for the party. Meanwhile, Jerry has gone to see Gertie and found her dying from poison. She calls for Captain Mary, whom she wants to pray for her, and Jerry sends a neighbor out to look for her. Babe and Herman have not progressed very well at the party and decide to leave. Herman is very drunk and before they have gotten very far, he drives the car into a snow drift and cannot manage to get it started again. Babe grows disgusted with him, leaves the car, and starts to walk home. Gertie's neighbor, believing her to be Captain Mary due to her outfit, excitedly accosts her and tells her she is wanted upstairs immediately. When they reach Gertie's room, Jerry stands behind a door so Babe does not see him. The neighbor explains the request and Babe falls on her knees beside the dying girl and prays earnestly and ardently for the forgiveness of the young woman's many sins. Gertie falls back on the pillow with a smile of content. Babe hurries from the room with tears in her eyes. Jerry follows her and catches her, just as she collapses from the terrific strain of the emotional experiences of the night. Jerry picks her up, bends over her and kisses her very tenderly. She opens her eyes and drops her head contentedly on his shoulder. Jerry carries her across the street and into the Salvation Army Mission where they first met.

== Cast ==
- Leatrice Joy as Babe Scott
- Victor Varconi as Jerry Wilson
- May Robson as Big Bertha
- Alice Lake as Goldie
- Elise Bartlett as Gertie
- Ivan Lebedeff as Lonnie
- Jane Keckley as Captain Mary
- Clarence Burton as Herman
- Carmencita Johnson as Baby (uncredited)
- Rosina Lawrence as Dancer (uncredited)

== Production ==
In addition to Weber as director, Harold McLernon was the film's editor, and Mitchell Leisen was production designer. Lenore Coffee wrote the screenplay, based on her own story. Arthur C. Miller was the cinematographer, and William Sistrom was the producer.

== Censorship ==
During the silent era in the United States, films were subject to censorship by state and city censor boards. During an attempt by the Motion Picture Producers and Distributors of America in 1928 to convince these state and local boards to limit the number of censorable sequences, The Angel of Broadway was cited as a film where the required cuts had ruined it. In the film, Babe Scott snubs the Salvation Army and incorporates an Army costume into a burlesque night club act. Events cause Babe to become disillusioned with life, but she later reforms and joins the Salvation Army on the level. While censors allowed her to join the charitable organization, the boards ordered cuts of the sequences depicting the moral depths to which the young woman had fallen. As a result, the continuity was destroyed, and the plot now lacked any contrast in Babe's life, which killed the box office in these states.

== Preservation ==
With no prints of The Angel of Broadway located in any film archives, it is a lost film.
