= Ivan Koschula =

- Directed by: Richard Oswald
- Written by: Richard Oswald
- Produced by: Jules Greenbaum; Paul Davidson
- Starring: Rudolph Schildkraut; Ernst Ludwig; Hanni Weisse
- Production company: Vitascope Film
- Distributed by: PAGU
- Release date: 25 November 1914
- Country: Germany
- Languages: Silent; German intertitles

Ivan Koschula is a 1914 German silent drama film directed by Richard Oswald and starring Rudolph Schildkraut, Ernst Ludwig and Hanni Weisse.

It was shot at the Tempelhof Studios in Berlin.

== Cast ==
- Rudolph Schildkraut as Ivan Koschula
- Ernst Ludwig
- Hanni Weisse
- Robert Valberg

== Bibliography ==
- Bock, Hans-Michael & Bergfelder, Tim. The Concise CineGraph. Encyclopedia of German Cinema. Berghahn Books, 2009.
