= Show Boat (novel) =

1926 novel by Edna Ferber

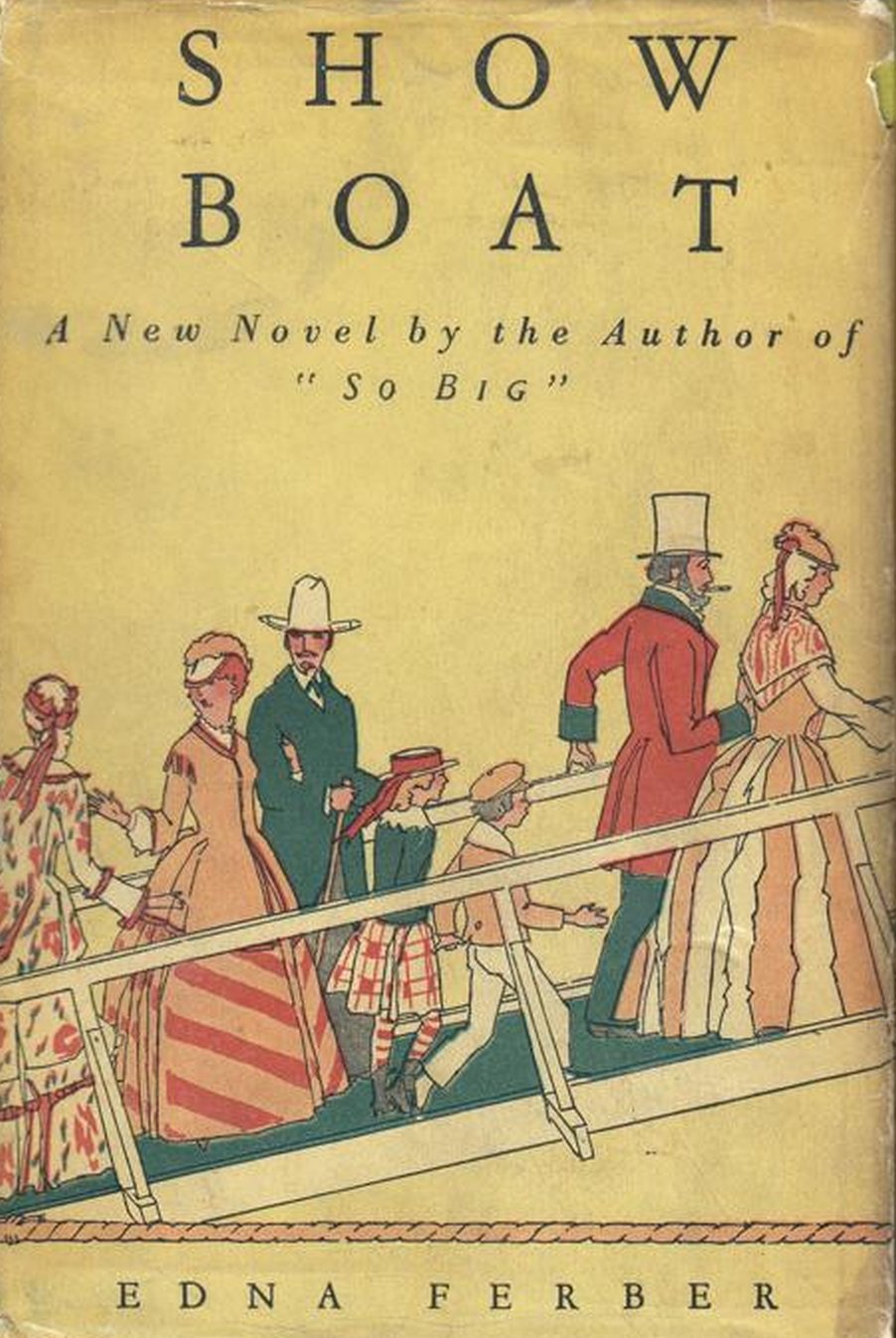
- First edition (US)
- Author: Edna Ferber
- Language: English
- Publisher: Doubleday, Page (US); Heinemann (UK)
- Publication date: 1926
- Publication place: United States
- Media type: Print (Hardcover)
- Pages: 341 pp

Show Boat is a 1926 novel by American author and dramatist Edna Ferber. It chronicles the lives of three generations of performers on the Cotton Blossom, a floating theater on a steamboat that travels between small towns along the banks of the Mississippi River, from the 1880s to the 1920s. The story moves from the Reconstruction Era riverboat to Gilded Age Chicago to Roaring Twenties New York and finally returns to the Mississippi River.

Show Boat was adapted as a Broadway musical of the same name in 1927 by Jerome Kern and Oscar Hammerstein II. Three films followed: a 1929 version that depended partly on the musical and two full adaptations of the musical in 1936 and 1951.

== Background ==
In August 1924, Edna Ferber watched as the opening performance of her play Minick (co-written with George S. Kaufman) was disrupted by an invasion of bats that had been nesting undetected in the chandeliers and dome of the playhouse. Alarmed theatergoers scurried for the exits. As the crew recovered from this debacle, Winthrop Ames, the show's producer, jokingly remarked, "Next time... we won't bother with tryouts. We'll all charter a show boat and we'll just drift down the rivers, playing the towns as we come to them."

Show boats were floating theaters that traveled along rivers of the United States from the 1870s to the 1930s. The performers lived aboard the vessels. With song, dance, and dramatic productions, show boats provided entertainment for small riverside towns that were otherwise quite isolated. Ferber, who had never heard of show boats, was immediately intrigued:

Here, I thought, was one of the most melodramatic and gorgeous bits of Americana that had ever come my way. It was not only the theater — it was the theater plus the glamour of the wandering drifting life, the drama of the river towns, the mystery and terror of the Mississippi itself... I spent a year hunting down every available scrap of show-boat material; reading, interviewing, taking notes and making outlines.

In 1925, Ferber traveled to Bath, North Carolina, and spent four days aboard one of the few remaining show boats in the country, the James Adams Floating Theatre, which plied the Pamlico River and Great Dismal Swamp Canal. An account of Ferber's visit to Bath is posted at NCHistoricSites.org. The material she gathered, especially the reminiscences of Charles Hunter, the director and chief actor, provided her with "a treasure-trove of show-boat material, human, touching, true." Ferber spent the next year in France and New York writing the novel, and published it in the summer of 1926.

The mix of romance, realistic depiction of racial issues, and nostalgia for a vanishing American past was an immediate hit with the public, and the novel was number one on the bestseller lists for twelve weeks. The critical reception was more cautious but still positive. In his New York Times review, Louis Kronenberger wrote:

With Show Boat, Miss Ferber establishes herself not as one of those who are inaugurating first-rate literature, but as one of those who are reviving first-rate story-telling. This is little else but an irresistible story; but that, surely, is enough.

By the time the James Adams Floating Theatre was destroyed by fire in 1941, the era of show boats had ended, supplanted by the motion pictures theater.

== Plot ==
In the late nineteenth century, Captain Andy Hawks is a former riverboat owner with a shrewish wife, Parthy Ann, and a 10-year-old daughter, Magnolia. He buys the new show boat Cotton Blossom. Among its acting cast are Julie Dozier and her husband Steve Baker; and Ellie Chipley and her husband, affectionately known as Schultzy. Other members of the crew are Pete, the engineer of the towboat Mollie Able, which propels the show boat; Frank, the utility man; and Windy McClain, the pilot.

Steve and Julie are close. Julie becomes Magnolia's best friend, exhibiting motherly affection toward her. For a time, all is well. However, Pete begins making unwanted advances toward Julie. This erupts into a fist fight between Pete with Steve. Pete is soundly beaten and swears revenge.

He implies knowing some dark secret concerning Julie. When the troupe arrives in fictional Lemoyne, Mississippi, Pete steals Julie's picture from the box office and takes it to the local sheriff. Julie claims she does not feel well enough to perform, and Parthy observes that Julie fell sick the year before in the same town. When they hear what Pete has done, Steve takes out a pocket knife, makes a cut on Julie's hand, and sucks blood from it.

The sheriff arrives and announces that there is a miscegenation case on board: since Julie is black and Steve is white, their marriage is illegal. Julie admits that she is half-black. Ellie, who has been very close to Julie, becomes upset at the revelation and hysterically denounces her friend. Steve says he has "negro blood" in him, and the rest of the company backs him up. The sheriff, not realizing that Steve's claim is based only on his having sucked some blood from Julie's hand, recites as Mississippi law that "one drop of Negro blood makes you a Negro in these parts". Although still suspicious, the sheriff is convinced by Windy, a boyhood friend, that he cannot arrest the couple. As he leaves, he tells Steve and Julie to leave the boat, which they do, after Julie sorrowfully says goodbye to Magnolia.

Years later, an 18-year-old Magnolia is the boat's newest leading lady. She has no leading man. Gaylord Ravenal, a handsome riverboat gambler, is hired, and he and Magnolia promptly fall in love and elope. Months later, Magnolia has had a baby daughter, whom she names Kim (because she was born at the moment when the Cotton Blossom was at the convergence on the Mississippi of the states of Kentucky, Illinois, and Missouri).

Shortly afterward, Captain Andy falls overboard during a storm and drowns. Rather than live with the stern Parthy, Magnolia, Ravenal and Kim relocate to Chicago. Their lifestyle alternates between rich and poor, depending on Ravenal's gambling winnings. He does not seek regular work, and he cheats on Magnolia with prostitutes. After about ten years, Parthy announces she is coming to visit. The destitute Ravenal, desperate for money, borrows some from Hetty Chilson, the local whorehouse madam. He returns, drunk, to Magnolia at their boarding house. As he sleeps off his stupor, Magnolia returns the money to Hetty and discovers the madam's secretary is Julie Dozier. Julie is devastated that Magnolia has found her working in the whorehouse. (The fate of Steve goes unmentioned in the novel.)

When Magnolia returns to the boarding house, she finds Ravenal gone, having left behind nothing but a farewell note. She never sees him again. She goes out to get work and is hired at a local nightclub, Joppers.

Years later, in 1926, show boats are becoming scarce on the Mississippi River. Kim has married and become a successful actress on Broadway in New York City. Her father Ravenal has been dead for several years. One night, Magnolia receives a telegram announcing the death of her mother Parthy, from whom she has been long estranged. She returns to the show boat, which she decides to keep and manage, rather than to scrap.

She gives all of her inheritance from Parthy, a fortune, to Kim. Joining Magnolia is Ellie, a widow since her husband Schultzy has died.

== Musical adaptation ==
Although Brooks Atkinson, the noted New York Times theatre critic, proclaimed the musical adaptation as being "positively slavish" to the novel, Hammerstein made several changes in adapting it to the musical stage.

== Radio ==
On March 31, 1939, on The Campbell Playhouse, Orson Welles presented a dramatic hourlong version of the Ferber novel in which he played the role of Captain Andy, and author Edna Ferber made her acting debut as Parthy. Margaret Sullavan played Magnolia as an adult, William Johnstone played Ravenal and, because of her success onstage in the role, Helen Morgan played Julie, though the one song she sang had nothing to do with the stage version of Show Boat. It was one of Morgan's last public appearances before her untimely death in 1941.

On February 20 and 27, 2011, a two-part version of Show Boat was broadcast on BBC Radio 4 in the Classic Serial spot. Based only on Ferber's novel, it was dramatised by Moya O'Shea, produced/directed by Tracey Neale, and starred Lysette Anthony as Kim, Samantha Spiro as Magnolia, Laurel Lefkow as Parthy, Morgan Deare as Cap'n Andy, Ryan McCluskey as Gaylord and Nonso Anozie as Jo, with original music by Neil Brand.

== Criticism ==
Writing for the Jewish Women's Archive in 2020, Allison Abrams described Show Boat as "problematic" on race, claiming that the novel "maintains a romanticized and subordinate image of Black Americans", uses "dehumanizing and animalistic terms" for Black people, perpetuates racial stereotypes about Black men, and "lumps Black Americans in the fold of the working class which is reflective of a perception of race as an economic class...and less so a social reality."

== See also ==
- Show Boat (1929 film)
- Show Boat (1936 film)
- Show Boat (1951 film)

== Sources ==
- Ferber, Edna (1960). A Peculiar Treasure. New York: Doubleday.
