= Landing (water transport) =

Terminal for water transport

A landing is a water terminal for river transport lines, such as for ferries, steamboats or cargo ships.

A notable example is the historic Public Landing on the north bank of the Ohio River in Cincinnati, Ohio, United States. In the age of steamboat transport, the public landing was frequently jammed with riverboat traffic with 5,000 arrivals and departures per season.

== See also ==
- Ferry terminal
