= Rudolph Schildkraut =

Austrian film and theatre actor (1862–1930)

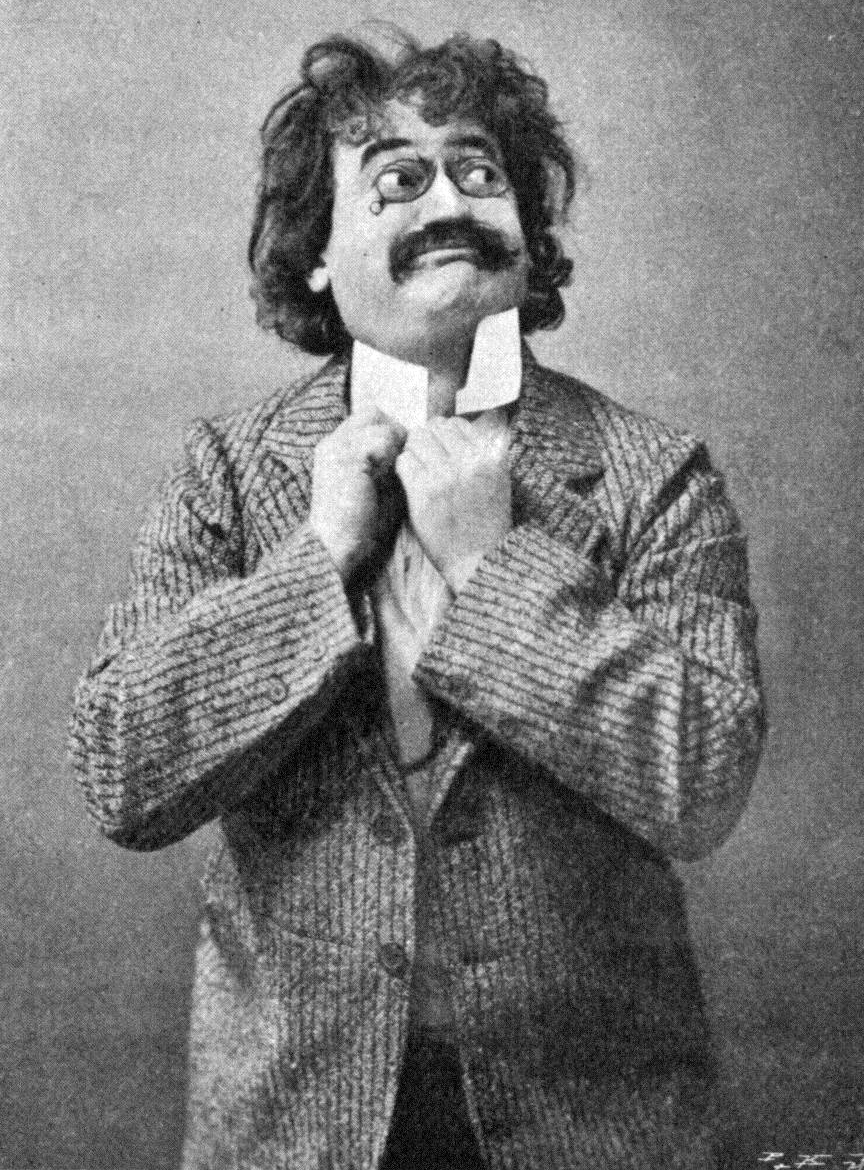
- Rudolph Schildkraut in 1901
- Born: 27 April 1862; Constantinople, Ottoman Empire (now Istanbul, Turkey)
- Died: 15 July 1930 (aged 68); Los Angeles, California, U.S.
- Burial place: Hollywood Forever Cemetery
- Occupation: Actor
- Years active: 1885–1930
- Children: Joseph Schildkraut

Rudolph Schildkraut (27 April 1862 – 15 July 1930) was an Austrian film and theatre actor.

== Life and career ==
Schildkraut was born in Constantinople in the Ottoman Empire to a Jewish family. His parents ran a hotel. He grew up in Brăila, Romania. In Vienna, he received acting lessons from Friedrich Mitterwurzer. He debuted in the early 1880s in Sopron; his first solid role came in 1885 in Krems.

In 1893, he moved to Vienna to an engagement at the newly opened Raimund Theater. In 1898, he moved to the Carl Theatre. Among other things, he played the character Wurm in Love and Intrigue. In 1900 he, came to the German Theatre in Hamburg, 1905 to the German Theatre in Berlin. There he became one of the most important actors in the theatre company of Max Reinhardt. His Shylock, which he played in 1905 and 1913, in Reinhardt's productions of The Merchant of Venice, was praised by Fritz Kortner as a "monument to the art of acting." Other major roles were the title role in King Lear (1908), Mephisto in Faust I (1909), Muley Hassan in Friedrich Schiller's Fiesco (1909), the grave-digger in Hamlet (1909), and Peter Bast in Knut Hamsun's From the Devil Fetched (1914). Schildkraut performed for the first time in the United States in 1910–1911.

Schildkraut was known as a film actor in the German Empire in the early silent era. He starred in several film dramas. His last European-made film was a biography of the German Zionism founder Theodor Herzl, in which he played Herb Schildt "The Struggling Israel." In 1920, he moved permanently to the United States and made his debut the same year in New York City in the play Silent Forces. From 1922, he also played in the English language. In 1925, he founded his own Jewish theatre in the Bronx.

In his last five years, he appeared in several Hollywood productions. His most notable film, which raised his profile in America, was The King of Kings by Cecil B. DeMille (1927), in which he played the High Priest Caiaphas.

He was married to Erna (Weinstein), with whom he had a son, Joseph Schildkraut (1896–1964), who also was an actor.

Schildkraut died at the age of 68 years of a heart attack while working at a film studio in Los Angeles. He is interred in the Hollywood Forever Cemetery in Hollywood, California. His son died at the age of 67, also of a heart attack.

== Partial filmography ==
- Der Shylock von Krakau (1913) - Isaak Levi
- Ivan Koschula (1914) - Ivan Koschula
- Laugh Bajazzo (1915) - Musiker Rudolf
- The Eighth Commandment (1915, Short)
- The Fool of Fate (1915, Short) - Block, ein Spekulant
- Demon and Human (1915) - Alex Fink
- Schlemihl (1915) - Schlemihl
- Das Wiegenlied (1916)
- The Fortune Tailors (1916) - Arzt
- The Lullaby (1916)
- The Dancing Heart (1916)
- Free Fighting (1919, Short)
- The Pasha (1919, Short)
- The Court Musician (1919, Short)
- Justice (1920)
- Theodor Herzl (1921) - Das ringende Israel
- His People (1925) - David Cominsky
- Young April (1926) - King Stefan
- Pals in Paradise (1926) - Abraham Lezinsky
- The King of Kings (1927) - Caiaphas - High Priest of Israel
- The Country Doctor (1927) - Dr. Amos Rinker
- A Harp in Hock (1927) - Isaac Abrams
- The Main Event (1927) - Regan Sr
- Turkish Delight (1927) - Abdul Hassan
- A Ship Comes In (1928) (also known as My Country) - Peter Pleznik
- Christina (1929) - Niklaas (final film role)
