= Public Landing, Cincinnati =

River landing in Ohio, United States

Coordinates: 39°05′49″N 84°30′13″W

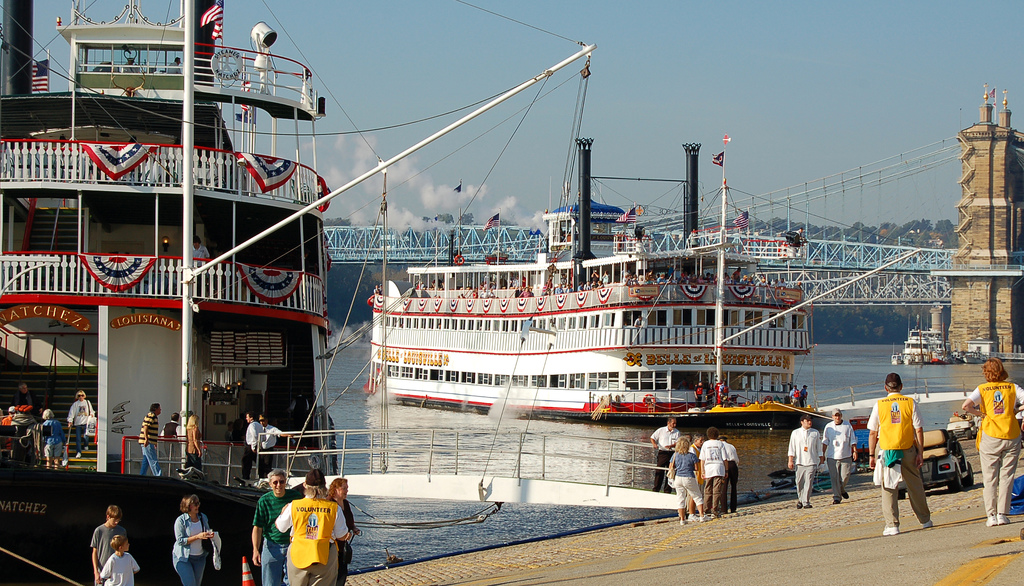
Riverboats dock at the Public Landing during the 2006 Tall Stacks festival

The Cincinnati Public Landing is the landing on the banks of the Ohio River in Cincinnati, Ohio, United States.

The Cincinnati Public Landing by 1825 had shipbuilding facilities. It was described in 1841 as a space of nearly 10 acres (4 ha), with a front of almost 1,000 feet (305 m). In the age of steamboat transport, the public landing was frequently jammed with riverboat traffic with 5,000 arrivals and departures per season.

The historic showboat Majestic was moored at the Public Landing until it was sold in 2019 at public auction and relocated to Manchester, Ohio.
