= James Adams Floating Theatre =

The James Adams Floating Theatre was a floating theater founded in 1914 by James Adams and his wife Gertrude. It that toured Chesapeake Bay, staging theater in Maryland, Virginia, and North Carolina. Over 200 different plays were performed in the years the James Adams Floating Theater was active (1914–1941).

It was visited in 1925 by Edna Ferber, who boarded the vessel in Bath, North Carolina, while researching what would become her 1926 novel Show Boat which inspired Jerome Kern and Oscar Hammerstein II’s Broadway musical Show Boat. After the James and Beulah retired in 1917, the management of the theater was turned over to Charles Hunter and his wife Beulah Adams Hunter (sister of James Adams).

For 28 seasons over the decades, the huge, scow-like wooden craft visited waterfront towns from the top of the Chesapeake down to the coast of North Carolina. Its audience capacity was 700. It occasionally ventured as far south as South Carolina and Georgia, but spent most of its time in Virginia, Maryland and North Carolina. The arrival of the Adams Floating Theater was an exciting time for residents in these isolated communities. The theater generally remained in one location for six nights, performing a different set of plays and entertainment each night to help ensure returning audiences. The seventh day was reserved for travel to the next location. As summer transitioned to autumn, the floating theater drifted south toward Elizabeth City, North Carolina, where it normally spent the winter.

By the 1930s, the business was falling off, though the shows continued through much of the decade. In 1941 the theater was destroyed by fire while being towed to Savannah, Georgia, to be refitted.

A group of volunteers has been working to build a reproduction.
