= Look for the Silver Lining (film) =

1949 film by David Butler

- Theatrical release poster
- Directed by: David Butler
- Screenplay by: Phoebe Ephron; Henry Ephron; Marian Spitzer
- Story by: Bert Kalmar; Harry Ruby
- Produced by: William Jacobs
- Starring: June Haver; Ray Bolger; Gordon MacRae; Charlie Ruggles; Rosemary DeCamp; Lee and Lyn Wilde
- Cinematography: J. Peverell Marley
- Edited by: Irene Morra
- Music by: David Buttolph; Ray Heindorf
- Color process: Technicolor
- Production company: Warner Bros. Pictures
- Distributed by: Warner Bros. Pictures
- Release date: June 23, 1949 (New York City)
- Running time: 106 minutes
- Country: United States
- Language: English
- Budget: $2.5 million or $1,780,000
- Box office: $4,130,000

Look for the Silver Lining is a 1949 American biographical musical film directed by David Butler and written by Phoebe Ephron, Henry Ephron and Marian Spitzer. A fictionalized biography of Broadway singer-dancer Marilyn Miller, it stars June Haver and Ray Bolger. It was nominated for an Academy Award for best scoring for a musical picture in 1950.

Although the film was popular and made a profit, Haver's performance of Marilyn Miller has been somewhat overlooked in comparison to the more memorable portrayal of Miller by Judy Garland in Till the Clouds Roll By, the 1946 MGM musical biography of the composer Jerome Kern.

== Plot ==
Marilyn Miller is rehearsing for a revival of the musical Sally. She has to stop because of pain or dizziness: She keeps pressing her hands to her head. While she rests in her dressing room, a man from her hometown comes to show her a poster of the Miller family, beginning a flashback to how she joined her parents vaudeville act, even though she is underage.

It is Jack Donahue who first spots Marilyn's talents, picking her "at random" from the audience one night and they ad-lib their way through a duet. Donahue keeps turning up on the same bills as the Miller Family, to Papa Miller's great annoyance. Marilyn reads too much into the relationship and thinks Donohue is going to propose. She is stunned to find out he is happily married---and that his "surprise" is an introduction to a British impresario who can give her her big break.

Marilyn gets a role in Profiles of 1914, where she is partnered with Frank Carter. Will Rogers tells her she will be a hit. When a representative from the authorities tries to stop Marilyn (who is under sixteen) from going on, Carter steps in and spins a yarn about their being engaged. He gives her one of his good luck elephants. They are a hit. He continues a tradition of giving her an elephant for each opening. Years pass. Ziegfeld invites Marilyn to discuss a role in his coming Follies. Frank has enlisted in the Army. She asks him to marry her; they elope as soon as he returns home from World War I.

Frank persuades her to take the lead in “Sally”. On opening night, Marilyn expects an elephant, but it does not come. Jack finds the package: the elephant is broken in two pieces. Marilyn goes on and is a huge success. In her dressing room, the people who love her tell her that Frank has been killed in a car crash.

Marilyn takes a break after Sally closes, on doctor's orders, but cannot stand doing nothing. She meets producer Henry Doran II and appears in Sunny, another hit, with Jack. Henry keeps proposing. He loves her enough for both of them. They kiss.

Dissolve to the opening scene. Jack is at the dressing room door. She tells him she has been thinking about her life, which has been nothing but show business. Why would she want anything else? Jack asks, and tells her that he would like to make his “final exit” after a great tap number on closing night of a hit show. Henry comes in and she tells him the doctor told her to give up lobster. Relieved, he leaves, but Jack knows her too well. Marilyn tells Jack that her doctor—who does not know her profession—says she must take it easy and avoid strenuous exercise, especially dancing. Jack tells her she must stop, and she reminds him of what he himself just said. Marilyn insists that, without performing, her life would feel meaningless. She goes out to rehearse. Cut to a performance of Sally which concludes the film with “Look for the Silver Lining”.

In 1949, many in the film's audience would know that the real Jack Donahue died suddenly in 1930 while on the road, and that Miller died in 1936 at age 38.

== Cast ==
- June Haver as Marilyn Miller
- Ray Bolger as Jack Donahue
- Gordon MacRae as Frank Carter
- Charlie Ruggles as Caro "Pop" Miller
- Rosemary DeCamp as Mama Miller
- Lee and Lyn Wilde as Claire and Ruth Miller
- Dick Simmons as Henry Doran
- S. Z. Sakall as Shendorf
- Walter Catlett as himself
- George Zoritch as Ballet Specialty
- Will Rogers Jr. as Will Rogers
- Lillian Yarbo as Violet (uncredited)
- Marlo Dwyer as Mitzi (uncredited)
- Vernon Dent as Heckler (uncredited)
- Phyllis Coates as Rosie (uncredited)
- William Forrest as William Taylor, producer (uncredited)
- Fred Kelsey as Stage Doorman (uncredited)
- Hank Mann as Stagehand (uncredited)
- Pierre Watkin as Theatregoer (uncredited)
- Leo White as Xmas Party Attendee (uncredited)

== Release ==
The film opened at Radio City Music Hall in New York City on June 23, 1949, together with a Fourth of July pageant. It grossed $142,000 in its opening week. In its sixth week of release, it grossed over $370,000 and was the number one film in the United States. It returned to number one two weeks later.

== Reception ==
Bosley Crowther condemned the film with faint praise in his June 24, 1949 review for The New York Times, opening with: “A couple of lively tap dances out of Ray Bolger's talented feet and three or four pleasant renditions of old familiar songs are the only rewards of any consequence that the patron is counseled to expect… Otherwise this Technicolored picture, based on the late Marilyn Miller's career, is a slow, unimaginative romance cut to obvious formula. The least of its several shortcomings is the fact that it doesn't begin to tell the story of Miss Miller, who was a rare personality. Instead, it follows the standard vaudeville-to-musical stardom plot,… So far as the details are presented, this could be the story of Tillie Doaks.”

According to Warner Bros. records, the film earned theatrical rentals of $3,089,000 in the United States and Canada and $1,041,000 internationally for a worldwide total of $4,130,000.
