= Sunny (1930 film) =

1930 film directed by William A. Seiter

- Lobby card
- Directed by: William A. Seiter
- Written by: Henry McCarty and Humphrey Pearson
- Based on: Sunny by Oscar Hammerstein II and Otto A. Harbach
- Starring: Marilyn Miller; Lawrence Gray; Inez Courtney
- Cinematography: Ernest Haller; Arthur Reeves
- Edited by: LeRoy Stone
- Music by: Jerome Kern; Oscar Hammerstein II; Otto A. Harbach
- Production company: First National Pictures
- Distributed by: First National Pictures
- Release date: November 9, 1930
- Running time: 78 minutes
- Country: United States
- Language: English
- Budget: $745,000
- Box office: $690,000

Sunny is a 1930 American pre-Code musical comedy film directed by William A. Seiter and starring Lawrence Gray, O. P. Heggie, and Inez Courtney. It was produced and released by First National Pictures. The film was based on the Broadway stage hit, Sunny, produced by Charles Dillingham, which played from September 22, 1925, to December 11, 1926. Marilyn Miller, who had played the leading part in the Broadway production, was hired by Warner Brothers to reprise the role that made her the highest-paid star on Broadway.

== Plot ==
Sunny (1930)

Sunny Peters is an American circus performer, doing her act in a British circus, who is engaged to a man she does not love. A former boyfriend, Tom Warren, stops by to see her before taking a boat back to the United States. Sunny realizing that she loves Tom, decides to run away. She embarks on the same boat that Tom takes. Her father, who realizes what his daughter has done, reaches the boat just as it is about to leave and manages to board it. While on board, Tom becomes engaged to be married to Margaret Manners, a wealthy socialite. Sunny learns that she will not be allowed to disembark in the United States without a passport. To land, Sunny marries an American friend, intending to divorce him as soon as she is safely inside the United States. After arriving in the States, Sunny tells Tom about her love for him. Margaret overhears them and tells Tom that she will announce their engagement at a party that very night. Disappointed, Sunny decides to return to England, but Tom proposes to her just as she is about to leave.

== Cast ==
- Marilyn Miller as Sunny Peters
- Lawrence Gray as Tom Warren
- Joe Donahue as James Denning
- O. P. Heggie as Mr. Peters
- Inez Courtney as Weenie
- Barbara Bedford as Margaret Manners
- Judith Vosselli as Sue Warren
- Clyde Cook as Sam
- Mackenzie Ward as Harold Harcourt Wendell-Wendell

uncredited

- Harry Allen as Side Show Barker
- B. F. Blinn as Party Guest
- William B. Davidson as First Ship's Officer
- Jay Eaton as Man 'Weenie' Flirts with at Ball
- Bill Elliott as One of Tom's Friends
- June Gittelson as Mrs. Hammerslagger
- Ben Hendricks, Jr. as Second Ship's Officer
- Franklin Pangborn as Party Guest
- Ellinor Vanderveer as Party Guest

== Music ==
- "The Hunt Dance" (Danced by Marilyn Miller)
- "I Was Alone" (Performed by Marilyn Miller)
- "When We Get Our Divorce" (Danced by Marilyn Miller and Joe Donahue)
- "Who?" (Performed by Marilyn Miller and Lawrence Gray)
- "Oh! Didn't He Ramble" (Performed by Lawrence Gray and Men)
- "Sunny" (Cut from film before release, but played briefly by the circus band)
- "D'Ya Love Me?" (Cut from film before release)
- "Two Little Love Birds" (Cut from film before release)

== Production ==
Marilyn Miller was paid $50,000 for her work on this film, after being paid $100,000 for Sally (1929), her previous film.

The film was completed as a full musical. Due to the backlash against musicals, however, Warner Bros. was forced to make many cuts to the film and much of the original music is missing or severely truncated. The film had originally been announced as a Technicolor production in trade journals. This was dropped once the studio realized that the public was growing weary of musicals. The film was released as a full musical outside of the United States, where a backlash against musicals never occurred. It is not known whether a print of this longer version still exists.

== Box office ==
According to Warner Bros records the film earned $537,000 domestically and $153,000 foreign.

== Preservation ==
Sunny survives only in the American cut version which was released in late 1930 by Warner Bros. This version of the film needs restoration. The current circulating print has a poor sound that was inappropriately transferred from the original Vitaphone discs in the 1950s. The original Vitaphone discs are still extant which could be used to properly restore the original sound to the film.

The black and white version is preserved in the Library of Congress collection.
