= Sunny (musical) =

- Music: Jerome Kern
- Lyrics: Oscar Hammerstein II; Otto Harbach
- Book: Oscar Hammerstein II; Otto Harbach
- Productions: 1925–1926 Broadway; 1926–1927 Hippodrome, London; 1927 Empire Theatre, Sydney; 1927–1930 UK National tour

Sunny is a musical comedy with music by Jerome Kern and a libretto by Oscar Hammerstein II and Otto Harbach. The plot involves Sunny, the star of a circus act, who falls for a rich playboy but comes in conflict with his snooty family. This show was the follow-up to the 1920 hit musical Sally, both starring Marilyn Miller in the title roles, and it was Kern's first musical in collaboration with Hammerstein. Sunny also became a hit, with its original Broadway production in 1925 running for 517 performances. The London production starred Binnie Hale and ran for 364 performances, while the UK national tour starred Felice Lascelles and ran for nearly three years.

== Productions ==
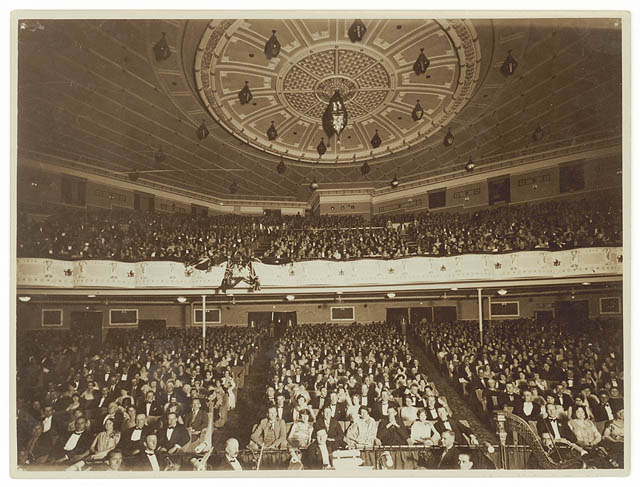
The Sunny audience. Empire Theatre, Sydney, Australia, March 1927. Photo by Sam Hood.

After a two-week tryout run at the Forrest Theatre in Philadelphia, the musical premiered on Broadway at the New Amsterdam Theatre on September 22, 1925. It was produced by Charles Dillingham and directed by Hassard Short, with scenic and costume design by James Reynolds. The cast included Marilyn Miller as Sunny, Jack Donahue as Jim Deering, Clifton Webb as Harold Harcourt Wendell-Wendell, Mary Hay as "Weenie" Winters, Louis Harrison as the First Mate, Joseph Cawthorn, Paul Frawley as Tom Warren, Cliff Edwards, Pert KeMoss & Fontana, Esther Howard as Sue Warren, Dorothy Francis, and the George Olsen Orchestra. Dances for Marilyn Miller were staged by Fred Astaire. The musical closed on December 11, 1926, after 517 performances.

The show was also produced in London at the Hippodrome, opening on October 7, 1926, and closing on July 16, 1927, after 364 performances. It starred Binnie Hale as Sunny and Jack Buchanan as Jim Demming. Buchanan doubled as choreographer, with direction by Charles Mast. This musical comedy was so popular in the UK that the partnership of Lee Ephraim and Buchanan had two separate companies of actors touring it simultaneously in the provinces; one company—starring Felice Lascelles as Sunny and Max Kirby, then Eric Fawcett, as Jim Demming—did so for nearly three years, opening in Margate on July 4, 1927 and closing in Ilford on May 31, 1930.

Another production of Sunny opened at the Empire Theatre, Sydney, Australia, in March 1927; it was produced by Ernest C. Rolls and starred the British performers Fred Bluett, Wyn Richmond, and Queenie Ashton, as well as the American Beatrice Kay.

== Musical numbers ==
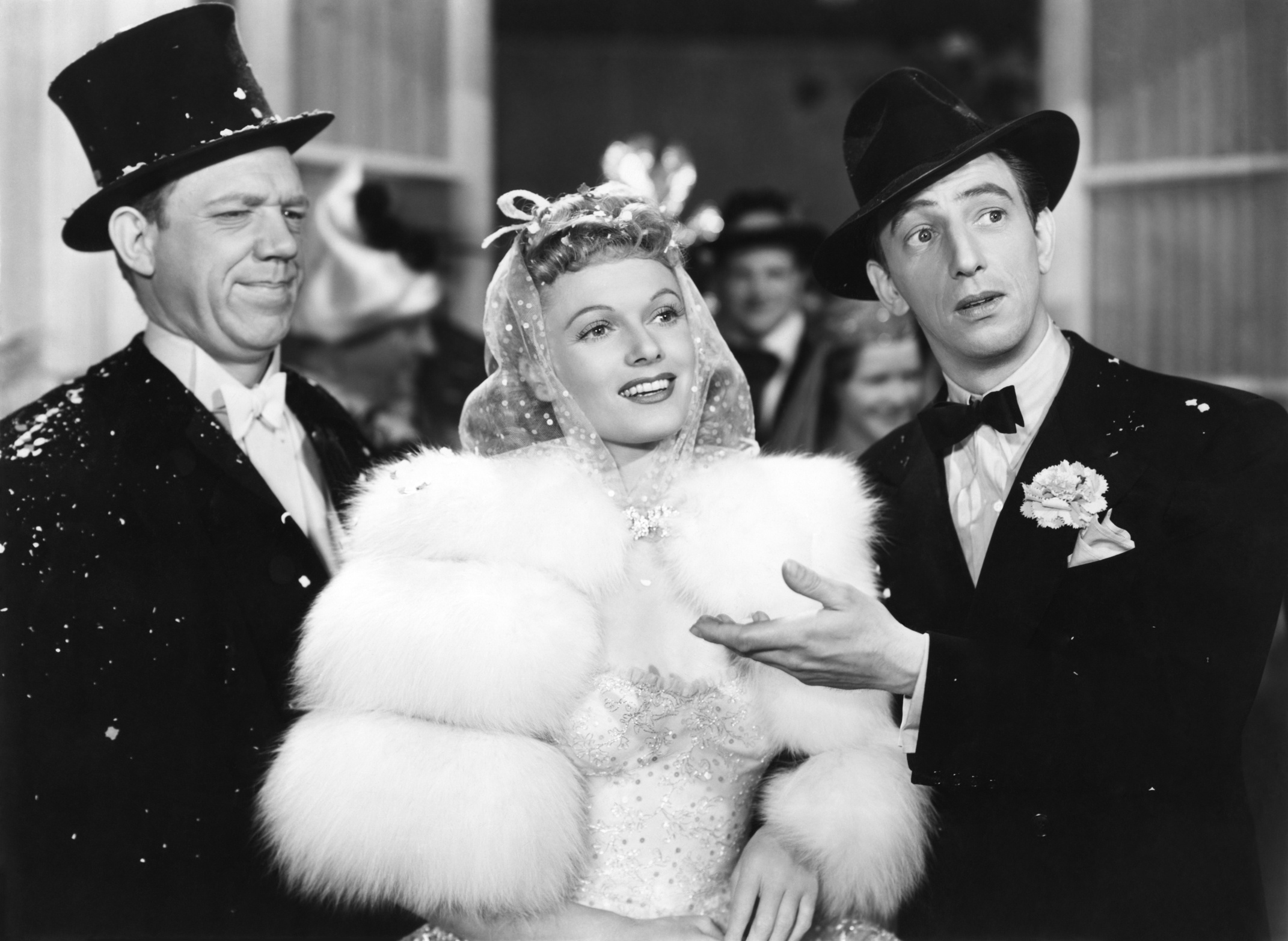
L-R: Paul Hartman, Anna Neagle, and Ray Bolger in the 1941 film adaptation

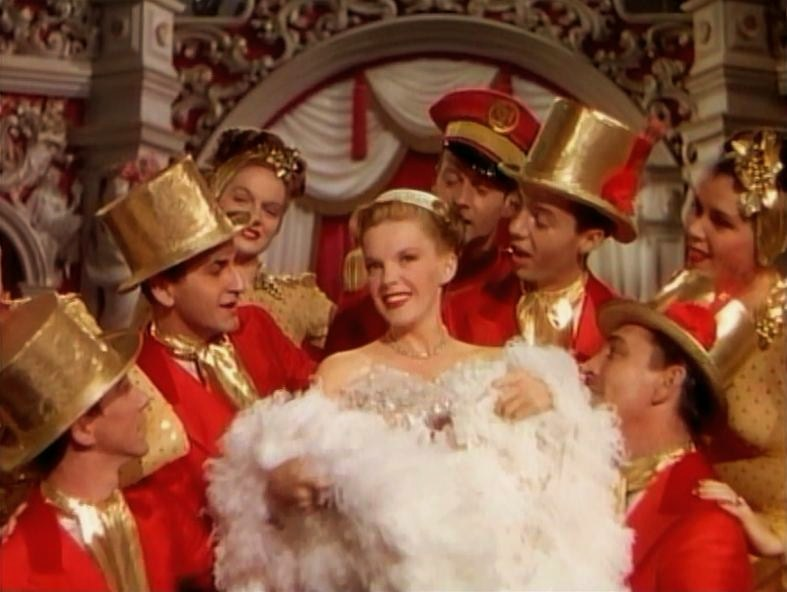
Judy Garland as Marilyn Miller in Till the Clouds Roll By (1946), in a show-within-a-show performance from the musical Sunny.

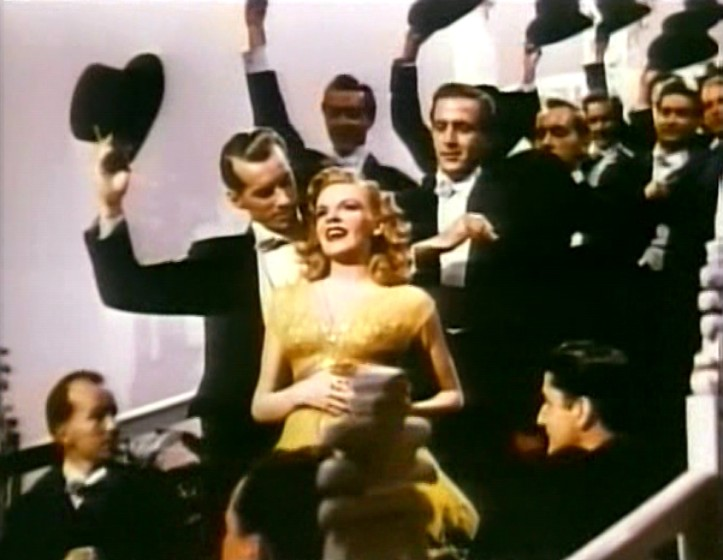
Judy Garland as Marilyn Miller singing "Who?" from Sunny in Till the Clouds Roll By (1946)

Note: The song list below is from the most common version of the show currently performed and excludes all specialties, cut numbers, and those added for other major productions.

Act I

- "Here We Are Together Again" - Ballyhoo and Ensemble
- "Sunny" - Tom and Boys
- Entrance of Sunny - Ensemble
- "Who?" - Tom and Sunny
- "So's Your Old Man" - Harold and the Eight Girls
- "Let's Say Good Night Till It's Morning" - Jim and Weenie
- "Pas de Equestrienne" - Sunny
- "D'Ye Love Me?" - Sunny
- "The Wedding Knell" - Sunny and Boys
- "Two Little Bluebirds" - Harold and Weenie
- Finale Act One - Company

Act II

- Opening Chorus - Ensemble
- "When We Get Our Divorce" - Jim and Sunny
- "Sunshine" - Marcia
- "Who?" (reprise) - Tom and Sunny
- Dance - Sunny, Jim, Harold, Weenie and Ensemble
- "The Chase" - Sunny, Tom, and Ensemble
- "The Hunt Ball" - Chorus
- "Pas d'Equestrienne" - Sunny
- "Finale Ultimo" - Sunny and Company

== Films ==
The musical was adapted for a 1930 film version directed by William A. Seiter and featuring additional music by Kern.

In 1941, a second film version was produced, directed by Herbert Wilcox. The first film starred Marilyn Miller, the second one (with a highly revised plot) starred Anna Neagle, with Ray Bolger in his first film role after playing the Scarecrow in The Wizard of Oz (1939).

== Recreation of scenes in film ==
In Sally of the Scandals (1928), the main character is in a musical production that was filmed using the chorus and sets from a production of Sunny at the Mayan Theater in Los Angeles.

In the film Till the Clouds Roll By (1946), a fictionalized biography of composer Jerome Kern, two songs from the show, "Sunny" and "Who?", are performed by Judy Garland as Marilyn Miller, representing a performance from the lead character, Sunny Peters.
