= Empire Theatre, Sydney =

Former entertainment venue in Sydney

The Empire Theatre is a former theatre in Sydney, New South Wales, Australia. It was a live music venue for a few years before 1929, when it became a cinema. Around 1940 it had a dual role and by 1950 it was hosting various kinds of stage shows, increasingly musicals, and was finally destroyed by fire on 31 July 1970.

== History ==
Railway Square, Haymarket
1 Empire Theatre

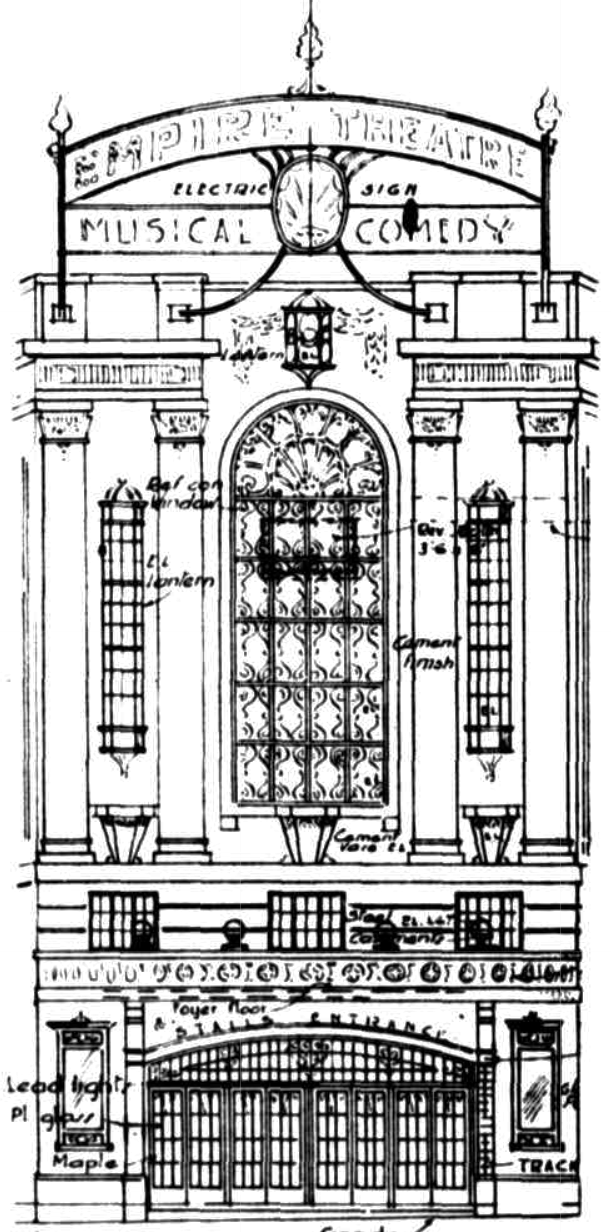
Facade, Empire Theatre

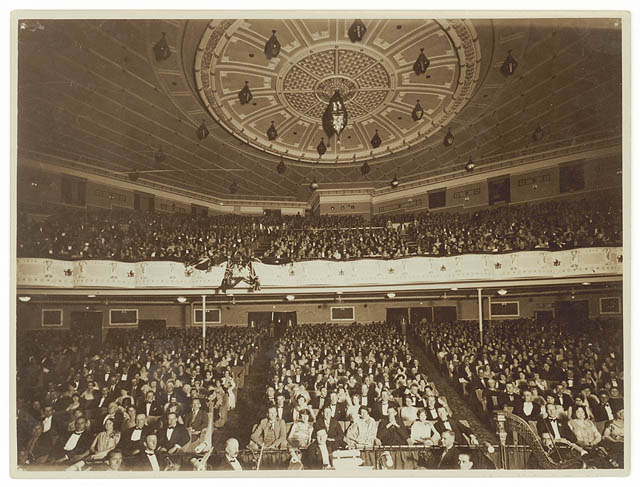
Empire Theatre interior, 1927. The audience were there for the musical comedy Sunny. Photo by Sam Hood.

The theatre was designed by Kaberry and Chard, and built by R. P. Blundell as a music hall for a syndicate led by leading bookmaker Rafe Naylor. The site was a 150 by 130 feet (46 m × 40 m) block on the Bijou Lane corner of Quay Street ("Saunders' Corner" (Note: So named for the long-established jewellery and gift shop nearby)), Railway Square, near the side entrance to Central Station. It opened on 1 May 1927 with the new Jerome Kern musical Sunny, followed by The Student Prince.

By this time stage musicals as public entertainment had been largely usurped by "talkies" and the theatre was reconfigured as a talking picture house around June 1929. It was one of the few Sydney cinemas independent of the General Theatres Corporation / Fullers' Theatres combination, so showing few "first release" films, until management signed up with RKO, and with Paramount Pictures, who already had an arrangement with Prince Edward Theatre.

During World War II, the Empire again hosted live performances, mounted by the A.I.F. Entertainment Unit interspersed with regular movie programmes.

From 1950 the Empire was used by "The Firm" of J. C. Williamson's for minor attractions: "The Great Franquin" (a stage hypnotist), a season of Gilbert and Sullivan favorites, — and ballet performances, hosting a three-week season of the National Ballet Company of Melbourne, which included the world premiere of Corroboree, with its composer John Antill conducting the Sydney Symphony Orchestra. Other ballet companies followed, culminating in the Borovansky Ballet in 1952.

In 1953 "The Firm" announced a major refit and facelift for the old theatre, leading to calls (around the time of the Coronation of Elizabeth II) for it to be renamed "Her Majesty's Theatre". The suggestion was taken up much later on 21 May 1960, when the musical My Fair Lady was being staged there.

The building was destroyed by fire on 31 July 1970.
