= Chester O'Brien =

American dancer, stage manager (1909–1996)

- O'Brien as Mr. Macintosh on Sesame Street
- Born: Chester Lee O'Brien; June 28, 1909; New York City, New York
- Died: July 14, 1996 (aged 87); Nassau, New York
- Other name: Chet O'Brien
- Occupations: Dancer, stage manager, actor
- Known for: "Mr. Macintosh" on Sesame Street
- Spouse: Marilyn Miller (m. 1934; died 1936)
- Awards: DGA Franklin J. Schaffner Achievement Award

Chester Lee "Chet" O'Brien (June 28, 1909 – July 14, 1996 (Note: A 31 December 1954 news article gives O'Brien's age as 45, which (if accurate) would mean he was born around 1909.)) was an American chorus dancer in the 1930s who became a stage manager. He worked on Oh! Calcutta! and on Sesame Street, where he also performed as "Mr. Macintosh".

== Biography ==
As a young man, Chet O'Brien and his twin brother, Mortimer "Snooks" O'Brien, performed together in a vaudeville dance act. He was an ensemble performer in Jonica in 1930, a performer in Fine and Dandy (1930-1931) and a performer in Who's Who (1938). On September 1, 1934, he married the actress Marilyn Miller, her fourth and final marriage. The marriage does not seem to have been happy. Miller died on April 7, 1936, from complications after nasal surgery.

Chet O'Brien was stage manager on Keep Off the Grass (1940). In the early 1950s O'Brien worked for CBS as a stage manager on the Arthur Godfrey shows. In December 1954, it was reported that he was leaving Columbia due to a pay cut. He was stage manager on Rumple (1957), The Most Happy Fella (1959), Finian's Rainbow (1960) and Brigadoon (1963). In 1967 he was stage manager on the TV show Mark Twain Tonight!. In 1972, he was stage manager on Oh! Calcutta!. Chet O'Brien appeared as "Mr Macintosh", a fruit and vegetable vendor, on Sesame Street in various episodes between 1975 and 1992. He was also production stage manager on that show for over ten years while his twin brother, Mortimer, was stage manager.

Chester O'Brien is listed among the 2010 Permanent Memorials of the Actors Fund of America.
