= Seventh Heaven (poetry collection) =

Book by Patti Smith

- Author: Patti Smith
- Cover artist: Judy Linn
- Language: English
- Genre: Poetry
- Publisher: Telegraph Books
- Publication date: 1972
- Publication place: United States
- Media type: Paperback
- Pages: 47
- ISBN: 978-0-915890-29-3
- OCLC: 128413912

Seventh Heaven is a poetry collection by Patti Smith, published in 1972.

== Contents ==
1. "Seventh Heaven"
2. "Sally"
3. "Jeanne Darc"
4. "Renee Falconetti"
5. "A Fire of Unknown Origin"
6. "Edie Sedgwick"
7. "Crystal"
8. "Marianne Faithfull"
9. "Girl Trouble"
10. "Cocaine"
11. "Judith"
12. "Fantasy"
13. "Marilyn Miller"
14. "Mary Jane"
15. "Amelia Earhart I"
16. "Amelia Earhart II"
17. "Linda"
18. "Death by Water"
19. "Celine"
20. "Dog Dream"
21. "Female"
22. "Longing"
