= Marilyn Miller =

Broadway musical star (1898–1936)

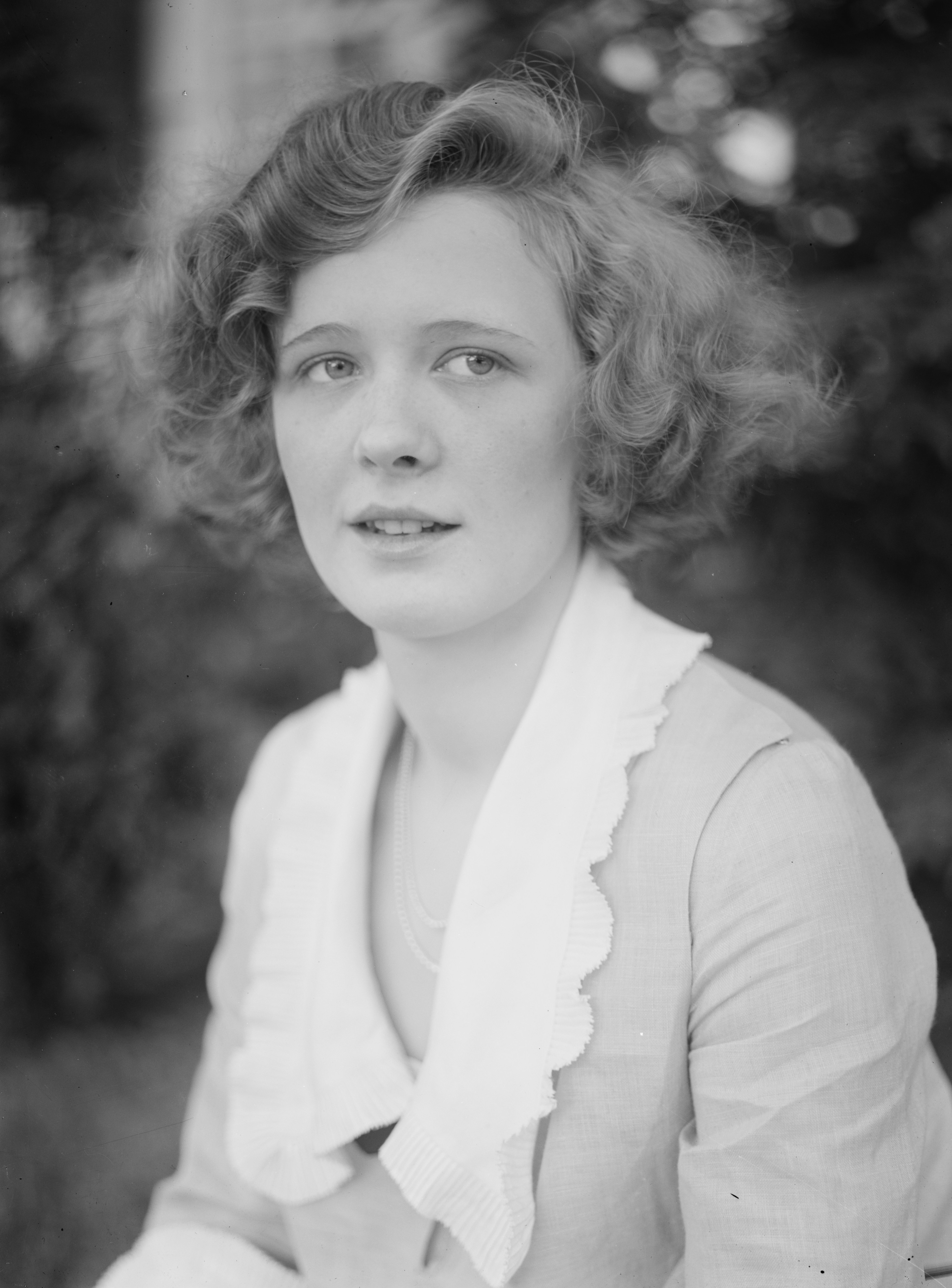
- Miller in c. 1925
- Born: Mary Ellen Reynolds; September 1, 1898; Evansville, Indiana, U.S.
- Died: April 7, 1936 (aged 37); New York City, U.S.
- Resting place: Woodlawn Cemetery
- Occupations: Actress; singer; dancer
- Years active: 1902–1936
- Spouses: Frank Carter (m. 1919; died 1920) Jack Pickford (m. 1922; div. 1927) Jack Donohue (m. 1928, divorced) Chet O'Brien (m. 1934)

Marilyn Miller (born Mary Ellen Reynolds; September 1, 1898 – April 7, 1936) was one of the most popular Broadway musical stars of the 1920s and early 1930s. She was an accomplished tap dancer, singer and actress, and the combination of these talents endeared her to audiences. On stage, she usually played rags-to-riches Cinderella characters who lived happily ever after. She had a history of sinus infections, the last of which required hospitalization and caused a toxicity – treated by blood transfusions as antibiotics were still a few years away – that caused her death at age 37.

== Early life ==
Marilyn Miller was born in 1898 in Evansville, Indiana, the youngest daughter of Edwin D. Reynolds, a telephone lineman, and his first wife, the former Ada Lynn Thompson. The tiny, delicately featured blonde was only four years old when she debuted in the role of Mademoiselle Sugarlump at Lakeside Park in Dayton, Ohio, performing as a member of her family's vaudeville act, named The Columbian Trio. That act, which included her stepfather Oscar Caro Miller and her older sisters Ruth and Claire, was renamed the Five Columbians after she and her mother joined the routine. From their home base in Findlay, Ohio, the five toured the Midwest and Europe for ten years and managed to skirt the child labor authorities until Lee Shubert discovered Miller at the Lotus Club in London in 1914.

== Career ==
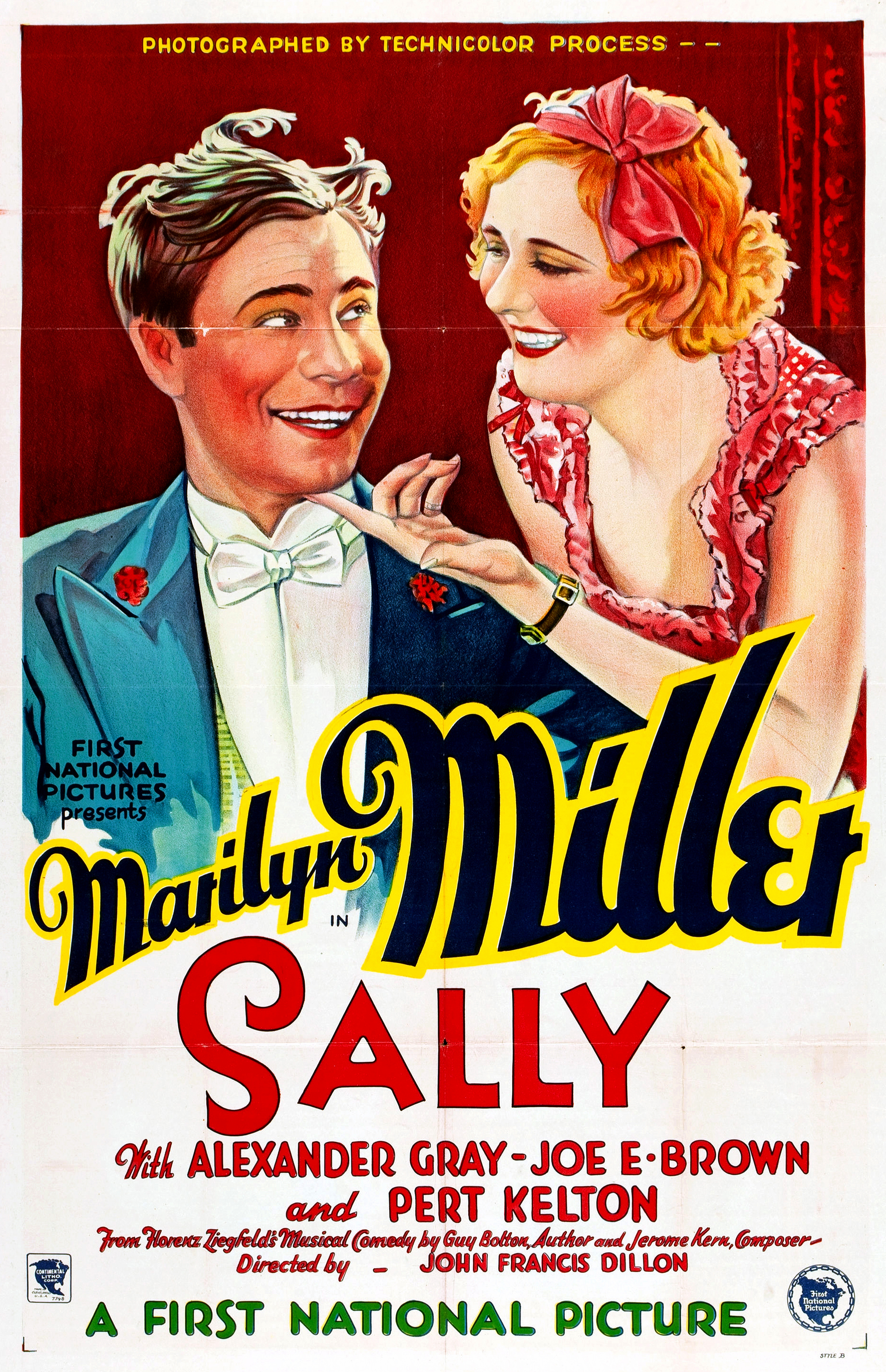
Poster for the 1929 film version of Sally

Miller appeared in New York City for the Shuberts in the 1914 and 1915 editions of The Passing Show, a Broadway revue at the Winter Garden Theatre, as well as in The Show of Wonders (1916) and Fancy Free (1918). It was, however, Florenz Ziegfeld who made her a star after she performed in his Ziegfeld Follies of 1918 in Manhattan at the New Amsterdam Theatre on 42nd Street, with music by Irving Berlin. Sharing billing with Eddie Cantor, Will Rogers and W. C. Fields, she brought the house down with her impersonation of Billie Burke, Ziegfeld's wife, in a number titled "Mine Was a Marriage of Convenience."

Miller followed as a headliner in the Follies of 1919, dancing to Berlin's "Mandy" and reputedly became Ziegfeld's mistress, though this was never proven. She attained legendary status in the Ziegfeld production Sally (1920) with music by Jerome Kern, especially for her performance of Kern's "Look for the Silver Lining". The musical, about a dishwasher who joins the Follies and marries a millionaire, ran 570 performances at the New Amsterdam. In 1921, the still-obscure Dorothy Parker memorialized her performance in verse:

From the alley's gloom and chill / Up to fame danced Sally. / Which was nice for her, but still / Rough upon the alley. / How it must regret her wiles. / All her ways and glances. / Now the theatre owns her smiles, / Sallies, songs, and dances. ...

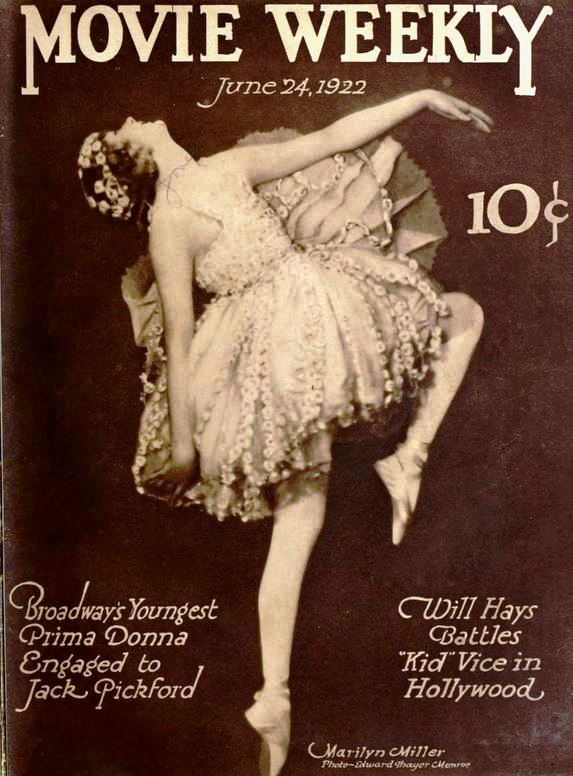
Miller, on the cover of the June 24, 1922 Movie Weekly

After a rift with Ziegfeld, Miller signed with rival producer Charles Dillingham and starred as Peter Pan in a 1924 Broadway revival, then as a circus queen in Sunny (1925), with music by Kern and lyrics by Oscar Hammerstein. A box-office smash, it featured the classic "Who?" and made her the highest-paid star on Broadway. In 1928, after reuniting with Ziegfeld, she starred in his production of the successful George Gershwin musical Rosalie, then in Smiles (1930) with Fred Astaire, one of Ziegfeld's rare box-office failures.

Miller's movie career was short-lived and less successful than her stage career. She made only three films: adaptations of Sally (1929), Sunny (1930), and Her Majesty, Love (1931), with W. C. Fields. Her last Broadway show, marking a major comeback, was the innovative 1933-1934 Irving Berlin/Moss Hart musical As Thousands Cheer, in which she appeared in the production number "Easter Parade".

Miller's last professional outing was her appearance in As Thousands Cheer. In 1936, she quit the show after her boyfriend and future husband Chester O'Brien – a chorus dancer who served as the production's second assistant stage manager – was fired for allowing the Woolworth department store heir Jimmy Donahue to sneak onstage during a scene in which Miller was impersonating his cousin, the heiress Barbara Hutton. After her death, this incident gave Irving Berlin the inspiration for a film musical On the Avenue, for which he received a script credit in addition to writing the songs.

At the time of her death, Miller was described as being in retirement.

== Origin of stage name ==
Miller's last name was adopted from her stepfather's surname, Oscar Caro Miller. In contrast, her first name was formed by combining her birth name, Mary, with her mother's middle name, Lynn. Initially calling herself Marilynn, she would drop one "n" at the urging of Florenz Ziegfeld.

In the late 1940s, Norma Jeane Baker (née Mortenson) changed her name to Marilyn Monroe at the urging of Ben Lyon, a one-time actor turned casting director at 20th Century Fox, who said she reminded him of Miller – he had played Miller's love interest in Her Majesty, Love. Monroe was named Marilyn Miller when she married the playwright Arthur Miller in 1956.

== Personal life ==
=== Engagements and marriages ===
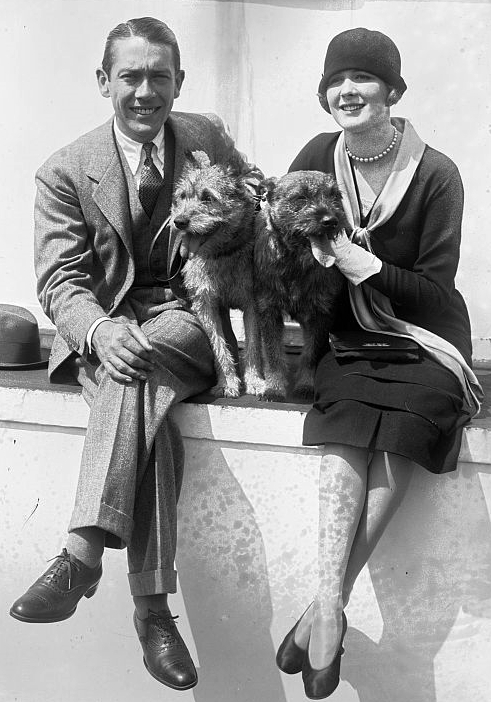
Jack Pickford and Marilyn Miller

Miller was married to:

- Frank Carter, an actor and acrobatic dancer, whom she married on May 24, 1919, at the Church of the Ascension in New York City. He was killed in a car accident in Cumberland, Maryland, on May 9, 1920. He was portrayed by Gordon MacRae in the Miller biopic Look for the Silver Lining and by Walter Willison in Ziegfeld: The Man and His Women.
- Jack Pickford, an actor and the brother of film star Mary Pickford. They were married in 1922, separated in 1926, and divorced in Versailles, France, in November 1927. By all accounts, it was an abusive marriage due to Pickford's substance abuse (both alcohol and hard drugs). Miller had attempted to secure a divorce in the Paris courts in the spring of 1927, but her published comments about how easy it would be to end her marriage in France "stirred the ire of the Paris Tribunal with the result that the court would take no action on Miss Miller's petition". She filed for divorce the following July in the nearby city of Versailles, whose tribunal eventually ended the marriage.
- Jack Donohue, a dancer who went on to become a successful director and choreographer in theater, films, and television. He should not be confused with Jack Donahue, who appeared with Miller in Sunny and Rosalie.
- Chester O'Brien, a chorus dancer, whom Miller married on October 4, 1934, in Harrison, New York. Several years older than him, she reportedly spent more than US$56,000 (equivalent to $1.3 million in 2025) on him during their brief 18-months together before her death. He, who later was known professionally as Chet O'Brien, became a stage manager for Broadway productions, including Brigadoon and Finian's Rainbow. He also was the stage manager and played Mr. Macintosh (the fruit-vendor) on Sesame Street from the premiere of the show in 1969 until 1992.

In 1930, Miller briefly was engaged to Michael Farmer, who later became a husband of Gloria Swanson. In 1932, she announced her intention to marry Don Alvarado, but the wedding did not occur.

=== Illnesses, alcoholism, and death ===
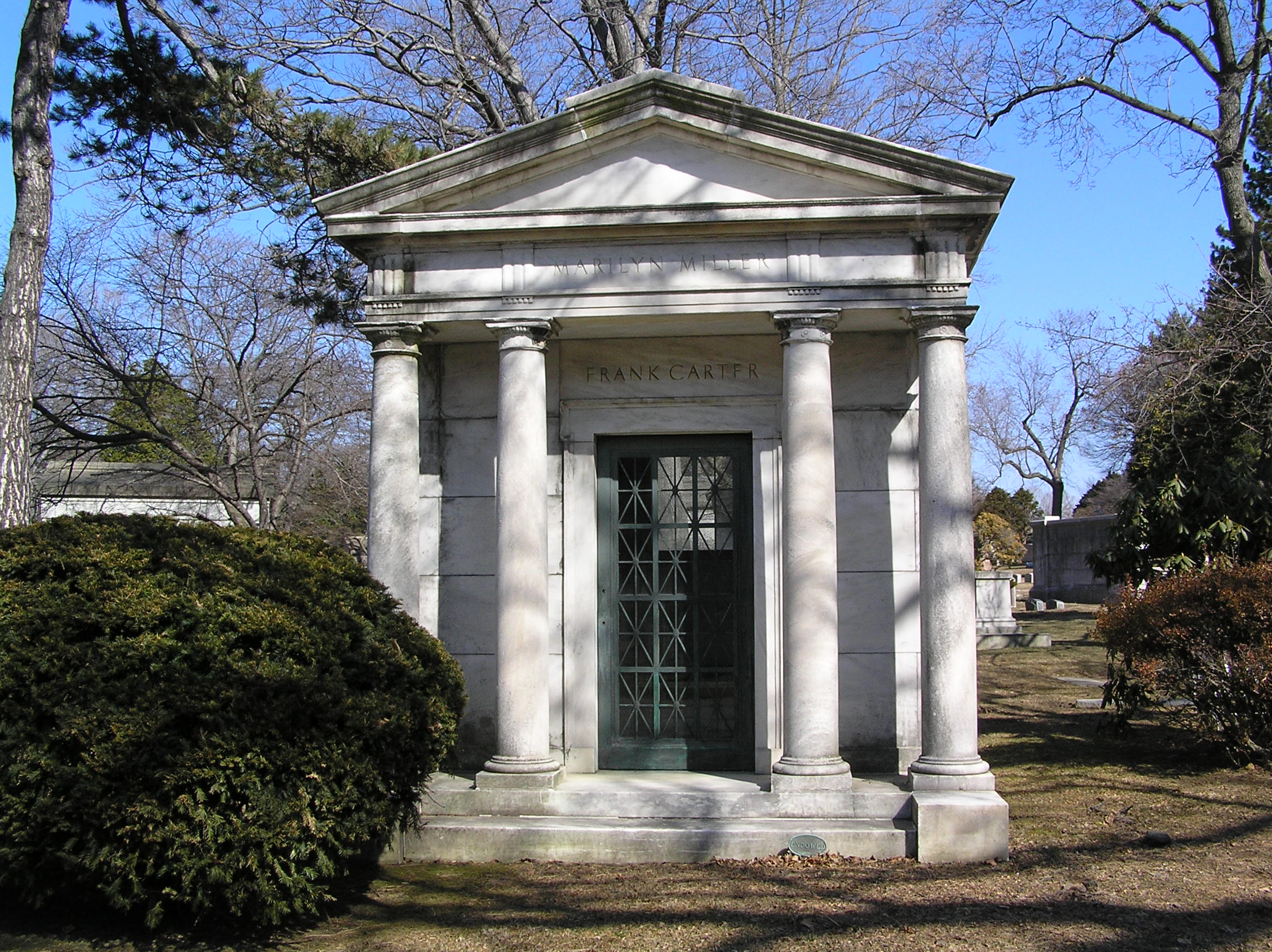
The mausoleum of Marilyn Miller in Woodlawn Cemetery

Miller had a long history of sinus infections, and her health was compromised by an increasing dependence on alcohol. In mid-March 1936, Miller entered New York's Doctors Hospital following a nervous breakdown, and a sinus condition. In late March, she developed a toxic condition, pushing her to near death, but she rallied back. Treatment included three blood transfusions. She died at age 37 on April 7, 1936.

Miller's funeral was held at Saint Bartholomew Church on Park Avenue, which drew 2,500-3,000 people, including former mayor Jimmy Walker, Beatrice Lillie, and Billie Burke. Another 5,000 people lined the streets. The procession led to Woodlawn Cemetery in the Bronx, where Miller was buried.

== Memorials ==
A statue of Miller, in the title role of Sunny, can still be seen atop the former I. Miller (no relation) Shoe Company Building at 1552 Broadway, in Times Square, Manhattan. It is one of four sculpted by Alexander Stirling Calder between 1927 and 1929 for the building's facade, representing famous theatrical professionals of the time. In 2013, after years of neglect, the building and statues were restored.

One of the poems in Patti Smith's 1972 book Seventh Heaven is titled "Marilyn Miller".

== Biographies (film and print) ==
In 1949, a biopic titled Look for the Silver Lining, starred June Haver as Miller. She was portrayed by Judy Garland in Till the Clouds Roll By, MGM's biopic of Jerome Kern. In 1978, the story of her turbulent relationship with Ziegfeld was portrayed in the Emmy-winning made-for-TV biopic Ziegfeld: The Man and His Women, starring Pamela Peadin as Miller, Paul Shenar as Ziegfeld, and Walter Willison as Frank Carter. Rare film footage of Miller in the 1929 film version of Sally can also be seen in the 2004 PBS documentary series Broadway, the American Musical.

In the only published biography of Miller, The Other Marilyn (1985), author Warren G. Harris describes her as "Ziegfeld's most dazzling star" and the premier musical comedy star of the Jazz Age. He adds, "She had rivals who may have been better dancers, singers, actresses, or mimics, but no one individual could equal her when it came to combining all those talents."

== Filmography ==
Year	Title	Role	Notes
1929	Sally	Sally/Noskerova	Filmed entirely in two-color Technicolor, now exists only in black-and-white, except for one fragment – most of the "Wild Rose" musical number – that has survived from an original Technicolor print.
1930	Sunny	Sunny Peters	
1931	Her Majesty, Love	Lia Toerrek	
