= Marian Spitzer =

American screenwriter (1899–1983)

- Born: Marian Adrienne Spitzer; February 20, 1899; New York City, New York, USA
- Died: July 18, 1983 (aged 84); New York City, New York, USA
- Education: New York University
- Occupation(s): Screenwriter, playwright, journalist
- Spouse: Harlan Thompson
- Children: Evan Thompson, Eric Thompson

Marian Spitzer (February 20, 1899-July 18, 1983, sometimes credited under her married name, Marian Spitzer Thompson) was an American screenwriter, journalist, playwright, and actress.

== Biography ==
Spitzer was born in Manhattan to Lewis Spitzer and Adaline Wolfsheim. She and her younger sister, Janet, were raised in New York City.

After graduating from New York University in 1918, she embarked on a career as a journalist, working at newspapers like The Evening Globe. She was fired from her Globe job after cutting work to spend time with her future husband, reporter (and future film producer) Harlan Thompson. She then transitioned into working as a publicity agent at the Palace Theatre while also writing short stories. She married Thompson in 1925.

She and Thompson wrote a number of plays and films together, and Thompson also had a brief flirtation with acting when she was cast in a role in Thru Different Eyes. The pair moved to Hollywood for a few years to write for the silver screen, and Marian took on a role as a story editor, producer's assistant, and script doctor at Paramount while writing novels and short stories on the side. Later in life, she wrote a book titled I Took It Lying Down about her experience suffering from tuberculosis, in addition to working for the New York City Office of Cultural Affairs in Carnegie Hall.

In 1940, she was named as someone with connections to the Communist Party.

== Selected works ==
Film

- Shake Hands with the Devil (1959)
- Look for the Silver Lining (1949)
- The Dolly Sisters (1945)
- Hangover Square (1945)

Literature

- The Palace (1969)
- I Took It Lying Down (1951)
- A Hungry Young Lady (1930)
- Who Would Be Free (1924)
