= Who? (song) =

1925 American song

Single by George Olsen and His Orchestra
- B-side: "Sunny"
- Released: 1925
- Genre: big band
- Length: 3:16
- Label: Victor
- Songwriters: Jerome Kern, Otto Harbach, Oscar Hammerstein II

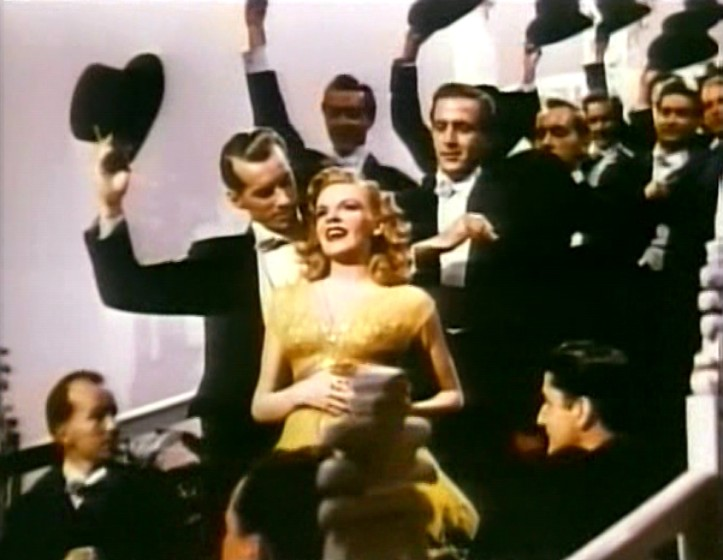
Judy Garland as Marilyn Miller singing "Who?" from Sunny in Till the Clouds Roll By (1946)

"Who?" (1925) is a popular song (sometimes written as "Who (Stole My Heart Away)?") written for the Broadway musical Sunny by Jerome Kern, Otto Harbach and Oscar Hammerstein II. The song was also featured in the film version of Sunny (1930) starring Marilyn Miller.

George Olsen and His Orchestra scored a major hit with their 1925 recording of the song. Tommy Dorsey and His Orchestra with vocalist Jack Leonard had a hit with it in the late 1930s; their arrangement was patterned after Dorsey's 1937 recording of "Marie". Judy Garland sang the song in the Metro-Goldwyn-Mayer biopic Till the Clouds Roll By (1946), loosely based on the life of Jerome Kern.

== Notable recording artists ==
- Pearl Bailey
- Josephine Baker
- Sidney Bechet
- Jack Buchanan
- The Tommy Dorsey Orchestra
- Dajos Béla and His Orchestra
- Roy Fox and His Orchestra
- Benny Goodman (both Goodman's Orchestra and Trio)
- Judy Garland
- Erroll Garner
- Carroll Gibbons and the Boyfriends
- Jean Goldkette & His Orchestra
- Binnie Hale
- Ace Harris
- The Ipana Troubadours
- Sammy Kaye
- Kurt Hohenberger
- Jerome Kern
- Gene Krupa and His Orchestra
- Guy Lombardo and His Royal Canadians
- Hal Mooney
- Red Nichols and The Five Pennies
- George Olsen and His Orchestra
- André Previn
- Eric Rogers and His Orchestra
- Raymond Scott Quintette
- The Ralph Sharon Trio
- Dinah Shore
- Frank Sinatra
- Paul Weston and His Orchestra
- Also on The Muppet Show 2 album as sung by Zelda Rose and Her Singing Owl (the latter singing only the "Who" part)
