= Look for the Silver Lining =

1919 popular song

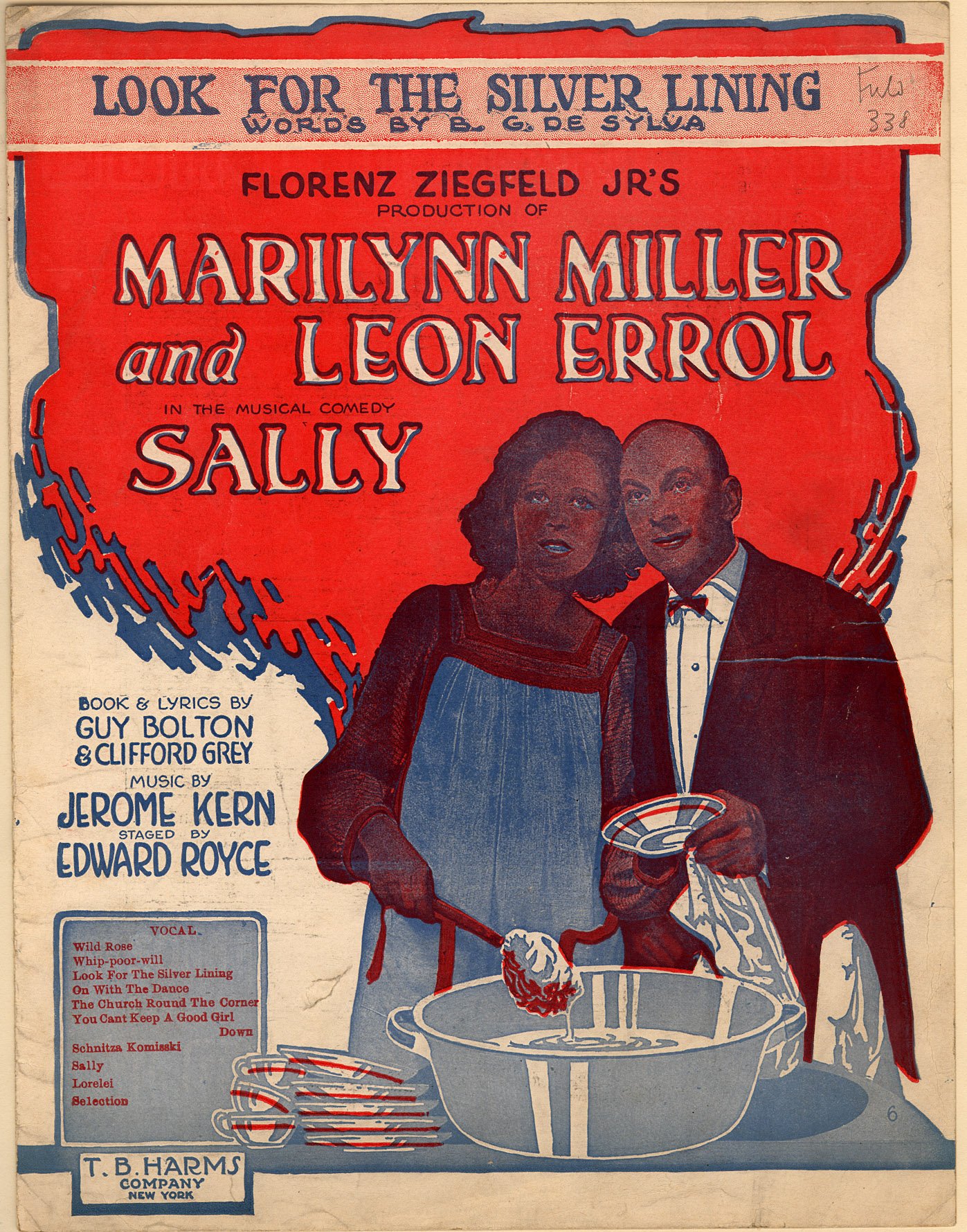
- Sheet music cover, 1919

Song
- Published: 1919
- Genre: Popular
- Composer: Jerome Kern
- Lyricist: Buddy DeSylva

Audio sample
- Recording of Look for the Silver Lining, (1921): file; help

"Look for the Silver Lining" is a 1919 popular song with music by Jerome Kern and lyrics by B.G. DeSylva.

== Background ==
The song was written in 1919 for the unsuccessful musical Zip, Goes a Million. In 1920, it was published and reused in the musical Sally whence it was popularized by Marilyn Miller, and was also used in the 1929 movie of the same name. Among others, it was later covered several times by Judy Garland, whose version also became, and remains, well-known.

A 1949 film of the same title is a biopic about Marilyn Miller.

Marion Harris' recording of the song is (anachronistically) featured in a memorable dance scene between Lady Mary and Matthew Crawley in the popular Masterpiece Classic series Downton Abbey. The scene can be viewed in Episode 8 of Series 2 where the plot-line reached early-to-mid 1919; however, the recording was not made until 29 December 1920.

The song was used as the opening theme of CBS Radio's The Billie Burke Show (1943–1946).

The strikingly similar "Look for the Union Label" seems based on the song.

Celeste Holm, portraying first lady Florence Harding, sang a portion of the song in "Backstairs at the White House."

== Notable recordings ==
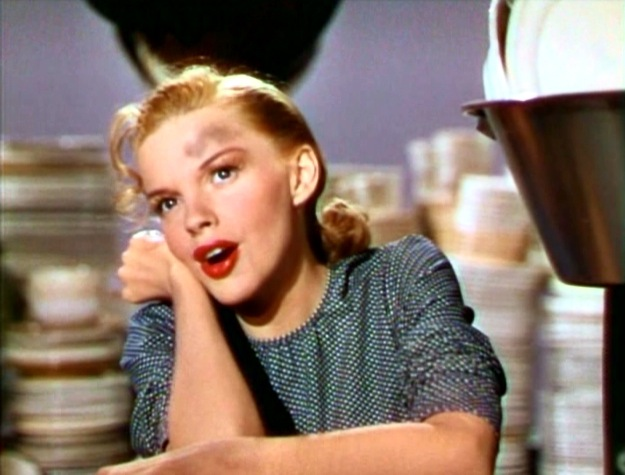
Judy Garland as Marilyn Miller performing the song in Till the Clouds Roll By (1946), a biographical film loosely based on the life and work of Jerome Kern

- Steve Conway (Columbia UK single, 1950).
- Chet Baker – Chet Baker Sings (1954). For several years a clip of Baker's rendition accompanied a bumper for Turner Classic Movies' morning programming block, titled "Sunny Side of Life" and featuring animation inspired by the paintings of Edward Hopper.
- Roberta Sherwood – Look for the Silver Lining (1959).
- Andy Williams – The Village of St. Bernadette (1959).
- Margaret Whiting – Margaret Whiting Sings the Jerome Kern Songbook (1960).
- Aretha Franklin – The Tender, the Moving, the Swinging Aretha Franklin (1962).
- Bing Crosby included the song in a medley on his album On the Sentimental Side (1962).
- Les & Larry Elgart - Girl Watchers (1966).
- Susannah McCorkle – From Broken Hearts to Blue Skies (1998), Most Requested Songs (1999).
- Leslie Odom Jr. – Leslie Odom Jr. (2014).
- Brad Mehldau – Suite: April 2020 (2020).
- Joel Culpepper - Chet Baker Re:imagined (2025)

== See also ==
- Silver lining (idiom)
