= Ted Hood (photographer) =

Australian photographer

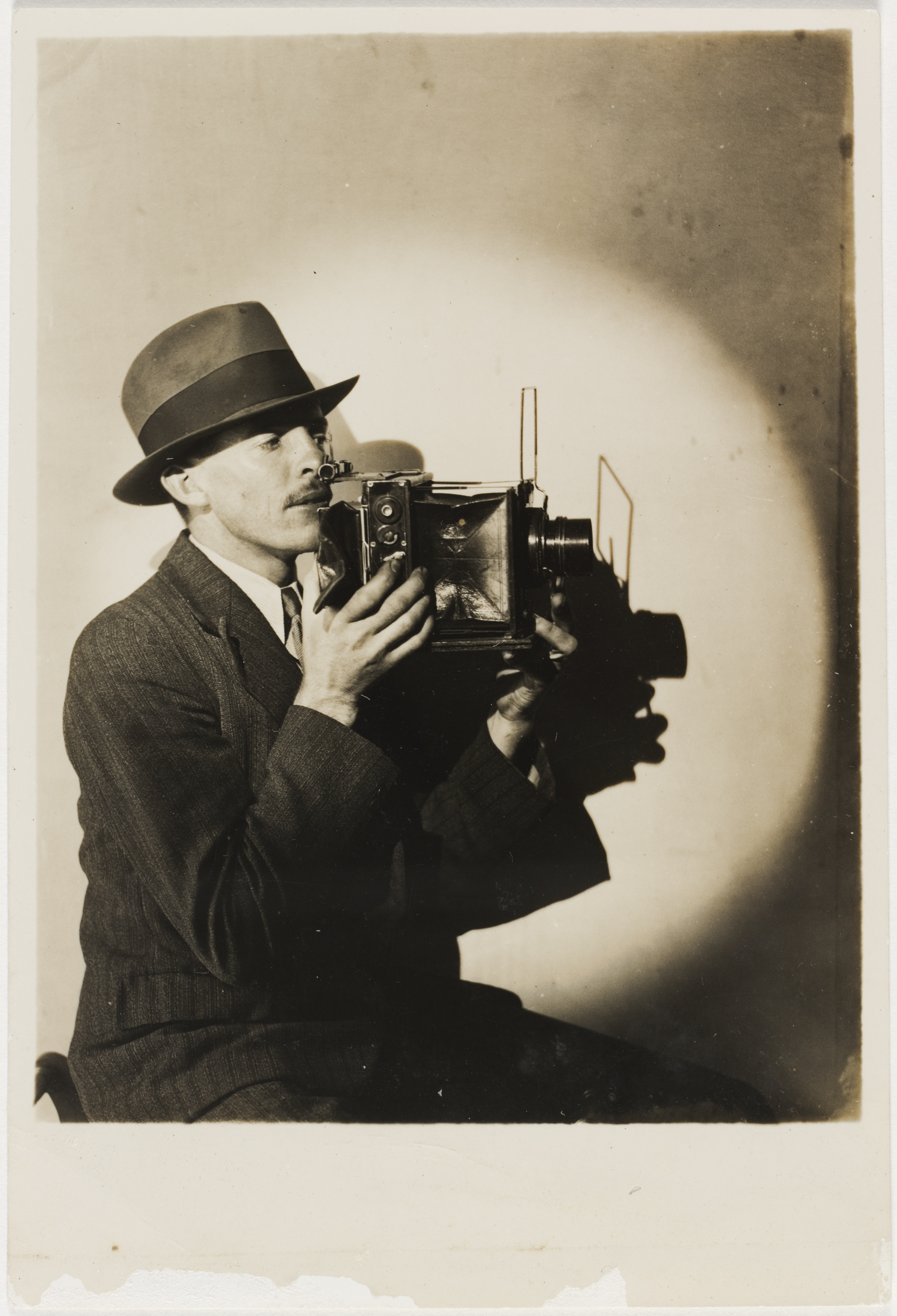
- Born: 1911; Balmain, Sydney
- Died: 15 September 2000 (aged 88–89); Willoughby, Sydney
- Known for: Photographer and photojournalist

Ted Hood (born Edgar Hood) (1911 – 15 September 2000) was an Australian photographer and photojournalist whose career spanned from 1929 to 1971.

== Early years ==
Ted Hood was born at Balmain, Sydney. His father Sam Hood was a photographer and photojournalist and had a studio at 124 Pitt Street, Sydney. A number of established photographers worked at his father's photographic studio including Ernie Bowen, Gus Daley, Jack Lazern, Lethington Maitland. Ted and his sister, Gladys, also worked at the studio.

== Career ==
=== Early career ===
Ted Hood began his career at his father Sam Hood's Dalny Studio at 124 Pitt Street and worked there between 1929 and 1934. Dalny Studio expanded its operations to include press photography providing photographs for various newspapers. Ted decided to pursue this line of work.

=== Press Photographer ===
Hood was employed as newspaper staff photographer for several Australian newspapers:

The Argus and Star 1934–1936 (Melbourne, Victoria)

Daily Telegraph (Sydney, New South Wales) 1936 +

Hood is perhaps best known for a photograph of the Sydney Harbour Bridge that appeared in the Argus 15 May 1930 with the following caption:

“The first photograph taken from the top of the jib of the creeper crane on the north side of the North Shore bridge, showing Dawes Point and Darling Harbour in the distance”

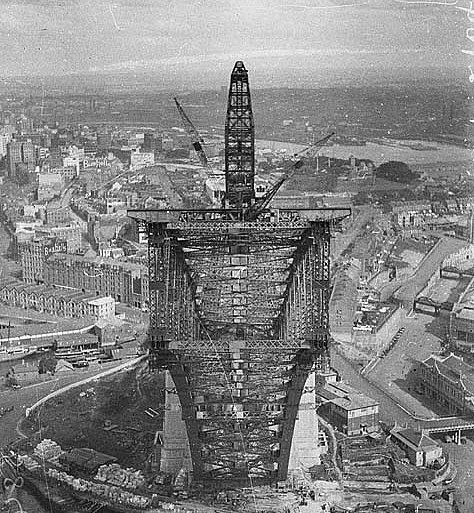
The first photograph taken from the top of the jib of the creeper crane on the north side of the North Shore bridge, showing Dawes Point and Darling Harbour in the distance

== Final years ==
Hood moved from Wamberal on the NSW Central Coast to Willoughby in Sydney in later life.

== Collected work ==
Ted Hood photographic collection, ca. 1913–1969 (121 negatives, 118 photographic prints, held by the State Library of New South Wales)

== See also ==
- Sam Hood
