= Sally (1929 film) =

1929 film

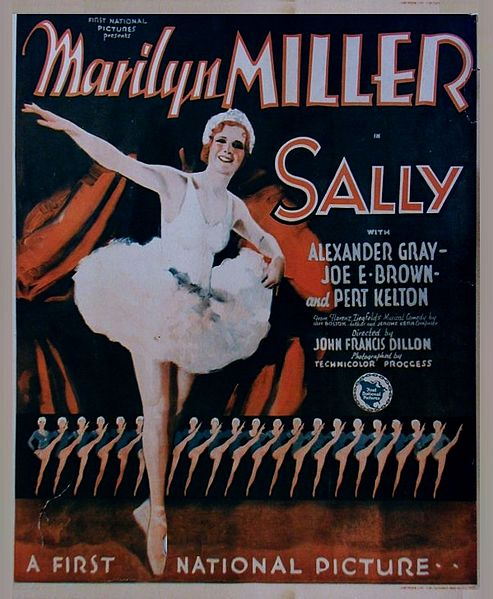
- Theatrical release poster
- Directed by: John Francis Dillon
- Written by: Waldemar Young; A.P. Younger
- Based on: Sally; 1920 musical by Guy Bolton and P.G. Wodehouse
- Starring: Marilyn Miller; Alexander Gray; Joe E. Brown; T. Roy Barnes; Ford Sterling
- Cinematography: Dev Jennings; Charles Edgar Schoenbaum (Technicolor)
- Edited by: LeRoy Stone
- Music by: Jerome Kern; Guy Bolton; Clifford Grey; Al Dubin; Joe Burke; Felix Mendelssohn
- Color process: Technicolor Process 3
- Production company: First National Pictures
- Distributed by: Warner Bros. Pictures
- Release dates: December 23, 1929 (NYC); January 12, 1930 (US); February 27, 1930 (LDN); June 21, 1930 (AU); September 22, 1930 (UK)
- Running time: 103 minutes
- Country: United States
- Language: English
- Budget: $647,000
- Box office: $2,198,000

Sally is a 1929 American sound (All-Talking) Pre-Code film. It is the fourth all-talking, all-color feature film made, and it was photographed in the Technicolor process. It was the sixth feature film to contain color that had been released by Warner Bros. Pictures; the first five were The Desert Song (1929), On with the Show! (1929), Gold Diggers of Broadway (1929), Paris (1929) and The Show of Shows (1929). (Song of the West was completed by June 1929, but had its release delayed until March 1930.) Although exhibited in a few theaters in December 1929, Sally entered general release on January 12, 1930.

The film was based on the Broadway stage hit Sally, produced by Florenz Ziegfeld and retains three of the stage production's Jerome Kern songs ("Look for the Silver Lining", "Sally" and "Wild Rose"). The film's other music was written by Al Dubin and Joe Burke.

Marilyn Miller, who had played the leading part in the Broadway production, was hired by Warner Bros. for an extravagant sum (reportedly $1,000 per hour for a total of $100,000) to star in the film.

The film was nominated for an Academy Award for Best Art Direction by Jack Okey in 1930.

== Plot ==
Sally (1929)

Sally Green is an orphan who had been abandoned as a baby at the Bowling Green telephone exchange. While living in an orphanage, she discovered the joy of dancing after being taught by an old woman. In an attempt to save enough money to become a dancer, Sally began working odd jobs. While she is working as a waitress at the Times Square Cafe, a man named Blair Farrell comes to see her regularly, though they only exchange glances through the window. Nevertheless, they fall in love. However, Sally does not know that Blair has been forced by his family into an engagement with a socialite named Marcia, the daughter of a wealthy woman from Long Island named Mrs. Ten Brock.

Broadway theatrical agent Otis Hemingway Hooper and his girlfriend, Rosie, are at the cafe ordering lunch when he offers Sally a chance to audition as a dancer, but she loses that waitress job and the audition opportunity when she accidentally spills a tray of food over Hooper's shoulder. In the kitchen, she sings "After Business Hours (That Certain Bizness Bigins)".

Sally takes a job setting and cleaning tables at the Elm Tree Inn, managed by Pops Stendorff. Blair visits during his bachelor party and immediately takes an interest in Sally while she is setting the table. She tells him her backstory and he sings "Look for the Silver Lining". He convinces Stendorff to have Sally dance for his customers. Blair’s friends arrive at his bachelor party and he tells them of Sally by singing "Sally".

Grand Duke Constantine of Czecoslovenia is a waiter at the inn. He was forced out of Czecoslovenia during an uprising initiated by Madame Noskerova, a prominent socialite and dancer. He makes Stendorff act like his subject because he is from Czecoslovenia. In the morning when Sally and Constantine are cleaning, they sing "Look for the Silver Lining". Sally and Blair go for a drive and sing "If I’m Dreaming (Don't Wake Me too Soon)".

The next day, Sally is performing at the inn. Hooper and Rosie are in the audience ordering dinner. Sally sings "All I Want to Do-Do-Do is Dance". Hooper recognizes Sally's talent during her performance and becomes her agent, convincing Sally to impersonate a famous Russian dancer named Madame Noskerova and perform at a party hosted by Mrs. Ten Brock.

At the party, she enters and performs "Wild Rose", after which she goes to the back to talk to Blair. They sing "If I'm Dreaming (Don't Wake Me too Soon)". Mrs. Ten Brock overhears them and plans to announce Blair's engagement. When Pops Stendorff discovers that Sally is missing, he calls the police and storms into the party, intending to take her back to the inn for a performance. Mrs. Ten Brock kicks him out and tells Madame Noskerova to continue dancing, but announces Blair's engagement beforehand. Sally feels hurt and blows her cover, and Mrs. Ten Brock throws her out.

Sally is devastated but later learns that she has been discovered by Florenz Ziegfeld, a guest at the party. Mr. Hooper presents her with a contract to star in Ziegfeld's next follies show on Broadway. After a successful opening night, Sally is visited in her dressing room by Pops Stendorff with flowers and a card from Blair, who has ended his engagement with Marcia. She is surprised when she discovers that Blair is also there, and he requests her forgiveness. Later, Sally and Blair emerge from a church after being married. Photographers rush them, urging them to kiss.

== Cast ==
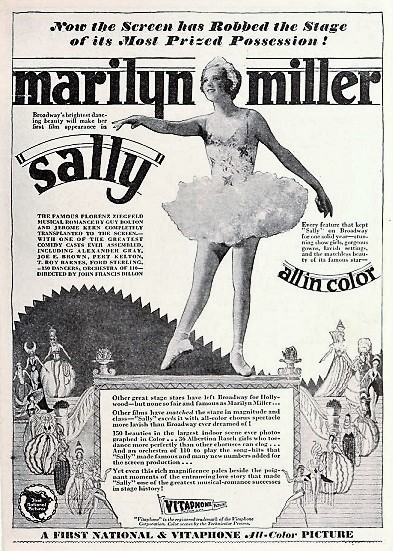
Advertisement for "Sally"

- Marilyn Miller as Sally/Noskerova
- Alexander Gray as Blair Farrell
- Joe E. Brown as Grand Duke Constantine
- T. Roy Barnes as Otis Hemingway Hooper
- Pert Kelton as Rosie, Otis' girlfriend
- Ford Sterling as 'Pops' Stendorff
- Maude Turner Gordon as Mrs. Ten Brock
- E. J. Ratcliffe as John Farquar
- Jack Duffy as The Old Roue
- Nora Lane as Marcia

== Box office ==
According to Warner Bros. records, the film earned $1,219,000 domestically and $979,000 foreign.

== Songs ==
- "After Business Hours (That Certain Bizness Bigins)"- By Al Dubin, Lyrics by Joe Burke, sung by Marilyn Miller with First National Vitaphone Orchestra
- "Look For the Silver Lining"- By Jerome Kern, Lyrics by Guy Bolton and Clifford Grey, sung by Marilyn Miller and Alexander Gray with First National Vitaphone Orchestra
- "Sally"- By Jerome Kern, Lyrics by Guy Bolton and Clifford Grey, sung by Alexander Gray with First National Vitaphone Stage Chorus and Orchestra
- "Look For the Silver Lining"- By Jerome Kern, Lyrics by Guy Bolton and Clifford Grey, sung by Marilyn Miller and Joe E. Brown with First National Vitaphone Orchestra
- "If I'm Dreaming (Don't Wake Me Too Soon)"- By Al Dubin, Lyrics by Joe Burke, sung by Marilyn Miller and Alexander Gray with First National Vitaphone Orchestra
- "All I Want to Do-Do-Do is Dance"- By Al Dubin, Lyrics by Joe Burke, sung by Marilyn Miller with First National Vitaphone Band
- "Wild Rose"- By Jerome Kern, Lyrics by Guy Bolton and Clifford Grey, sung by Marilyn Miller with First National Vitaphone Stage Chorus and Band
- "If I'm Dreaming (Don't Wake Me Too Soon)"- Reprise- By Al Dubin, Lyrics by Joe Burke, sung by Marilyn Miller and Alexander Gray with First National Vitaphone Orchestra
- "The Broadway Follies Ballet"- By Al Dubin, performed by First National Vitaphone Stage Chorus and Orchestra
- "Sally"(Ending of "Broadway Follies Ballet")- Reprise- By Jerome Kern, Lyrics by Guy Bolton and Clifford Grey, sung by First National Vitaphone Stage Chorus and Orchestra

=== Incdental scoring ===
- "In a Kitchenette"- By Al Dubin and Joe Burke from the 1929 film Gold Diggers of Broadway
- "What Will I do Without You?"- By Al Dubin and Joe Burke from the 1929 film Gold Diggers of Broadway
- "Wedding March"- By Felix Mendelssohn

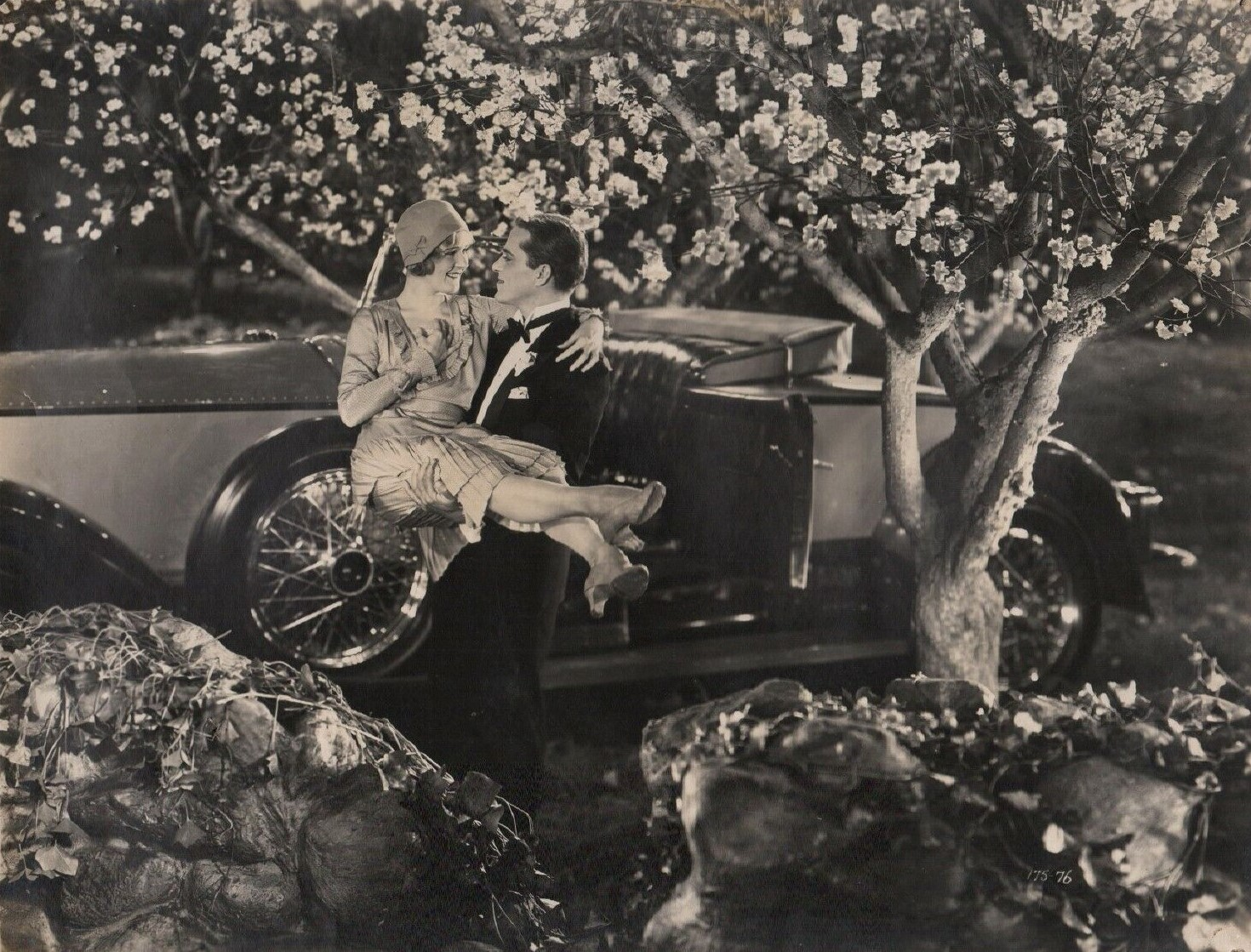
Still of "If I'm Dreaming (Don't Wake me too Soon)"

== Preservation ==
Although never technically a lost film, Sally was unavailable for public viewing for nearly six decades. Warner Bros. sold the rights to its pre-1950 film library to Associated Artists Productions. It was not until around 1990 that the film became available for archival and revival screenings. However, the film survives only in black and white with a 2 1/2-minute color segment from the "Wild Rose" musical number, which was discovered in the 1990s. Sepia-toned black-and-white footage has been inserted to replace frames missing in the color fragment. In 2014, archivist Malcolm Billingsley discovered a cache of 35mm Technicolor fragments lasting 45–75 seconds, including a 29-second fragment from the first reel.

The song "After Business Hours (That Certain Bizness Bigins)" does not exist in the existing black and white print and soundtrack, although it was released as part of the official sheet music.

In 2022, an unofficial reconstructed colorized version was made available online.

== See also ==
- List of early color feature films
- List of early sound feature films (1926–1929)
- List of incomplete or partially lost films
