= Till the Clouds Roll By =

1946 film by Richard Whorf

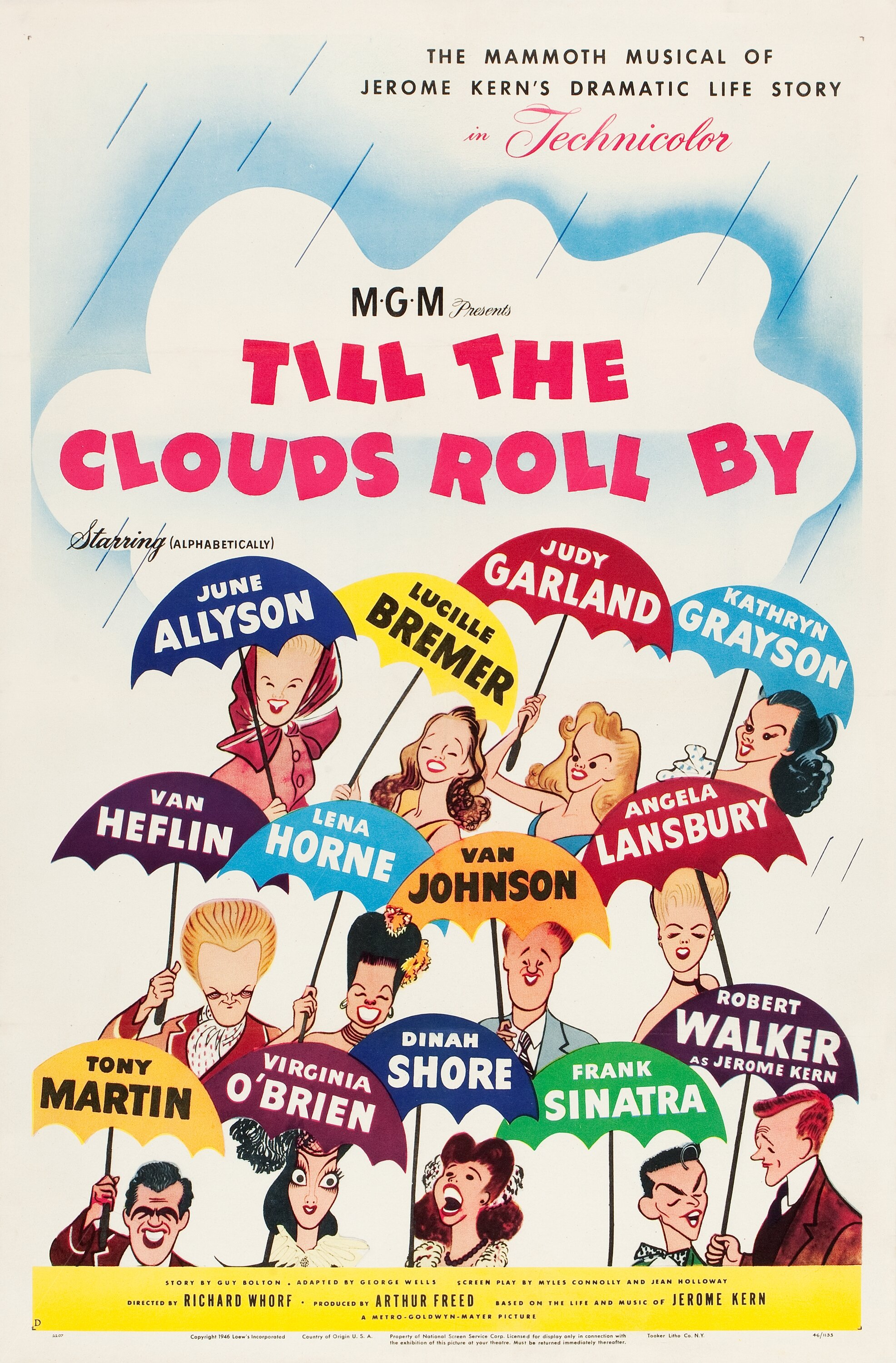
- Theatrical release poster
- Directed by: Richard Whorf uncredited: Busby Berkeley; Henry Koster; Vincente Minnelli (Judy Garland seqs.); George Sidney ("Ol' Man River"/Finale)
- Screenplay by: Myles Connolly; Jean Holloway; George Wells (adaptation); Uncredited: Fred Finklehoffe; John Lee Mahin; Lemuel Ayers; Hans Willheim
- Story by: Guy Bolton
- Produced by: Arthur Freed
- Starring: June Allyson; Lucille Bremer; Judy Garland; Kathryn Grayson; Van Heflin; Lena Horne; Van Johnson; Angela Lansbury; Tony Martin; Virginia O'Brien; Dorothy Patrick; Dinah Shore; Frank Sinatra; Robert Walker
- Cinematography: George J. Folsey; Harry Stradling
- Edited by: Albert Akst
- Music by: Music: Jerome Kern; Lyrics: Leonard Joy; Otto Harbach; Ira Gershwin; P. G. Wodehouse; Guy Bolton; Jimmy McHugh; Edward Laska; Oscar Hammerstein II; Jerome Kern; Herbert Reynolds; Dorothy Fields; B. G. DeSylva
- Production company: Metro-Goldwyn-Mayer
- Distributed by: Loew's Inc.
- Release date: December 5, 1946 (New York City)
- Running time: 132 minutes
- Country: United States
- Language: English
- Budget: $3,316,000
- Box office: $6,724,000

Till the Clouds Roll By (1946)

Till the Clouds Roll By is a 1946 American Technicolor musical film produced by Metro-Goldwyn-Mayer and a fictionalized biopic of composer Jerome Kern, portrayed by Robert Walker. Kern was involved with the production, but died before its completion. It was the first in a series of MGM biopics about Broadway composers.

The film is one of the MGM musicals that entered the public domain when MGM failed to renew its copyright.

== Plot ==
Kern attends the opening night of Show Boat in 1927, the landmark musical that secured his popularity. Following several of the show's most notable songs, Kern departs to reminisce about his early days as a young songwriter.

Kern recounts meeting Jim Hessler, a musical mentor, and Hessler's young daughter Sally. Kern and the Hesslers grow close, and he later visits them in London. Taking Sally to the fair inspires Kern to conceive a stage production for one of his songs. At the London Gaieties revue, Kern's song garners the attention of theatrical producer Charles Frohman.

When Kern happens to meet Eva Leale, it's love at first sight, but the courtship is cut short. He must abruptly sail back to New York to adapt The Girl from Utah for its Broadway debut. Following the show's success, Kern narrowly misses sailing back to London on the ill-fated RMS Lusitania.

The 1917 opening night of Oh, Boy! includes the musical number "Till the Clouds Roll By". The composer proposes to Eva and returns to New York to continue his string of theatrical successes, including Leave It to Jane. His 1920 musical Sally, starring Marilyn Miller, popularized the song "Look for the Silver Lining".

Now grown up, Sally Hessler asks her Uncle Jerry to help her get a stage role. He writes the song "Who?" for her to have a part in the 1925 musical Sunny. After the show's producers give the song to star Marilyn Miller, Sally leaves in protest. At the opening night of Sunny, Kern learns that Sally has run off, leaving her father despondent.

All attempts to locate Sally fail and Jim Hessler dies, leaving a mourning Kern unable to work. Oscar Hammerstein visits the Kerns to share a copy of the 1926 novel Show Boat. The same night, Kern learns that Sally will be performing at a club in Memphis, Tennessee. He leaves to find her and they make amends; he then spends the night listening to the sounds of the Mississippi River.

Having recounted his life story so far, Kern feels his career has likely come to a conclusion with Show Boat. On the contrary, he continues to write hit shows, including The Cat and the Fiddle (1931) and Roberta (1933). While visiting a sound stage at MGM, Kern is delighted to discover that the studio has cast Sally to perform in a new film featuring his songs.

The film concludes with highlights of Kern's Hollywood career, including songs from Swing Time (1936), Cover Girl (1944), and Broadway Rhythm (1944); the montage ends with songs from Sweet Adeline and Show Boat.

== Cast ==
- Robert Walker as Jerome Kern
- June Allyson as herself/Jane in Leave It to Jane
- Lucille Bremer as Sally Hessler (fictional)
- Judy Garland as Marilyn Miller
- Kathryn Grayson as Magnolia Hawks in Show Boat/Herself
- Van Heflin as James I. Hessler, Kern’s (fictional) mentor
- Lena Horne as Julie LaVerne in Show Boat/Herself
- Dorothy Patrick as Eva Kern nee Leale
- Van Johnson as bandleader in Elite Club
- Tony Martin as Gaylord Ravenal in Show Boat/Himself
- Dinah Shore as Julia Sanderson
- Frank Sinatra as himself
- Gower Champion as specialty dancer in Roberta
- Cyd Charisse as specialty dancer in Roberta
- Angela Lansbury as London specialty
- Ray McDonald as dance specialty in Oh, Boy! and Leave It to Jane
- Virginia O'Brien as Ellie Mae in Show Boat/Herself
- Mary Nash as Mrs. Muller
- Joan Wells as Young Sally Hessler
- Harry Hayden as Charles Frohman
- Paul Langton as Oscar Hammerstein II
- Paul Maxey as Victor Herbert

Cast notes

- Esther Williams makes a cameo.
- Sally Forrest and Mary Hatcher make appearances as "chorus girls".
- Kathryn Grayson reprised the role of Magnolia Hawks in MGM's film adaptation of Show Boat, released in 1951.
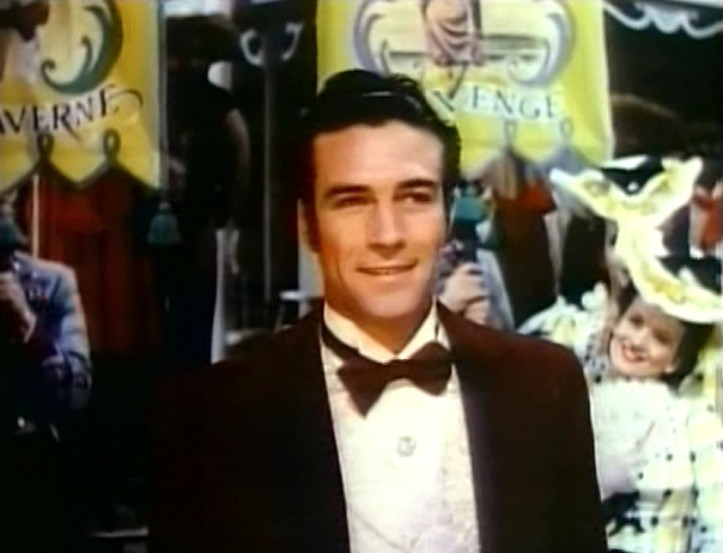
Bruce Cowling

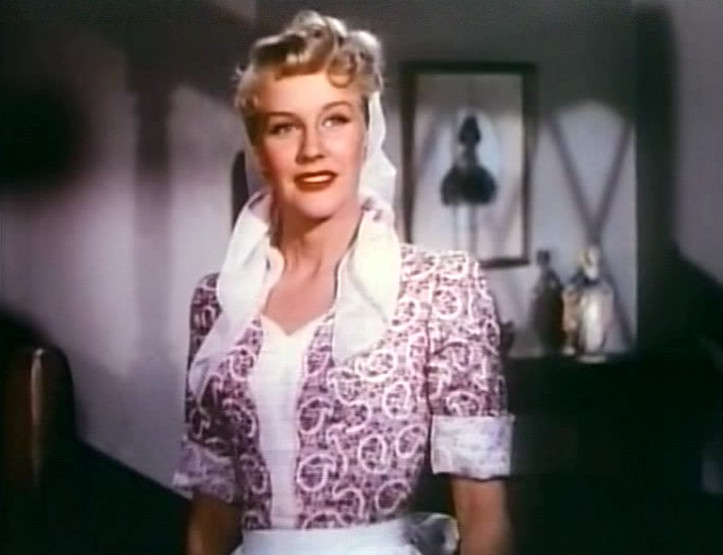
Dorothy Patrick

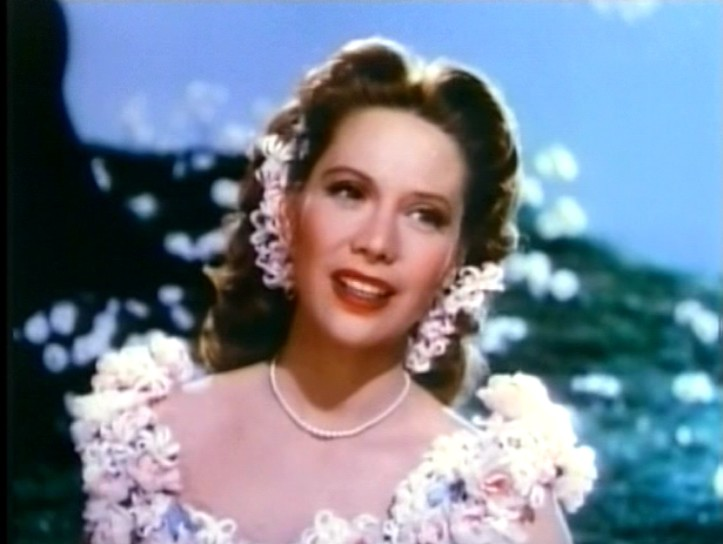
Dinah Shore

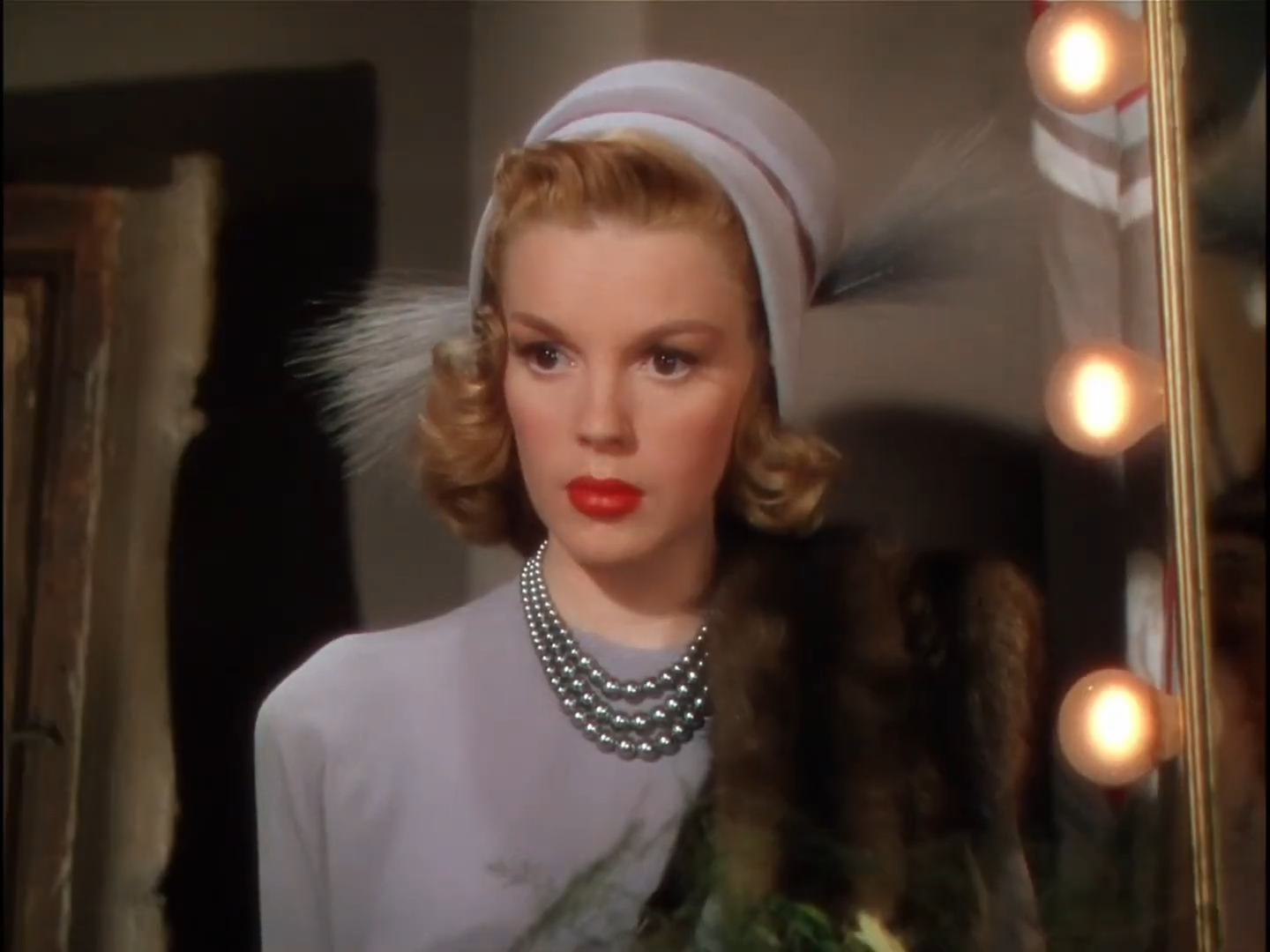
Judy Garland

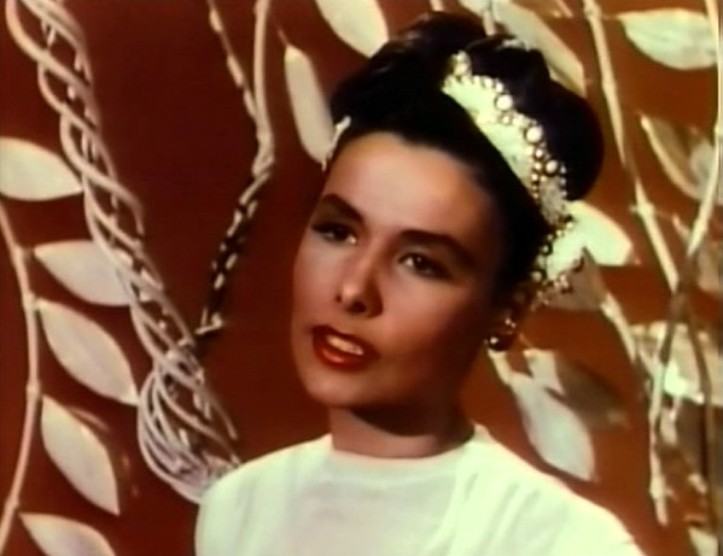
Lena Horne

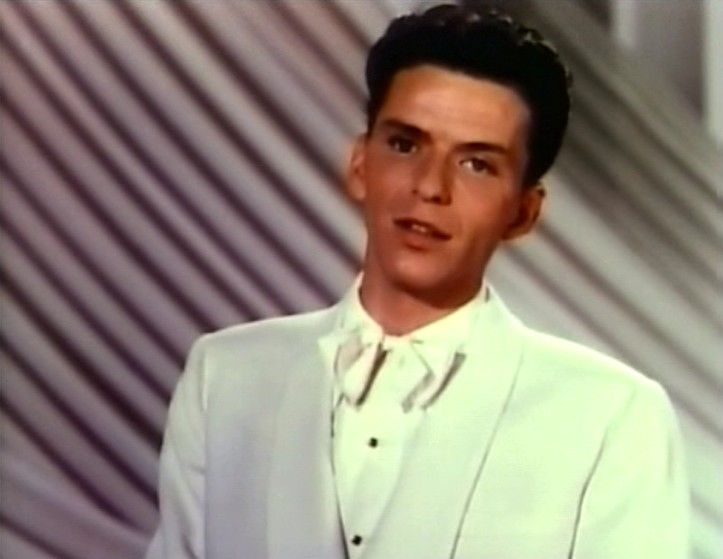
Frank Sinatra

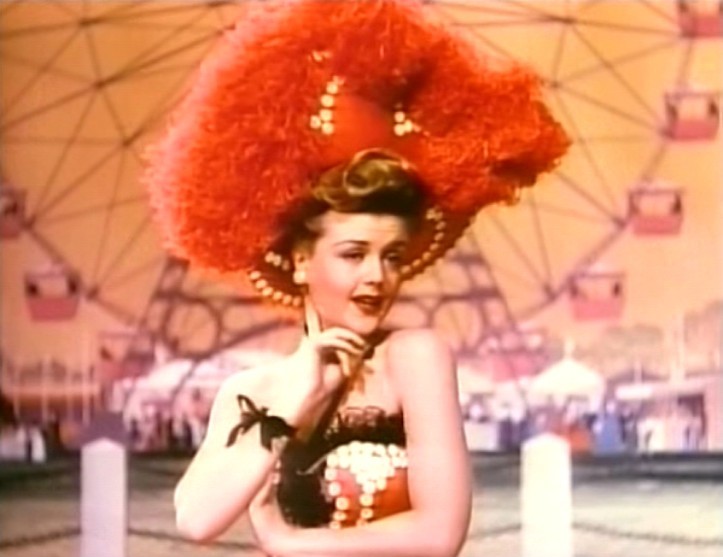
Angela Lansbury

== Production ==
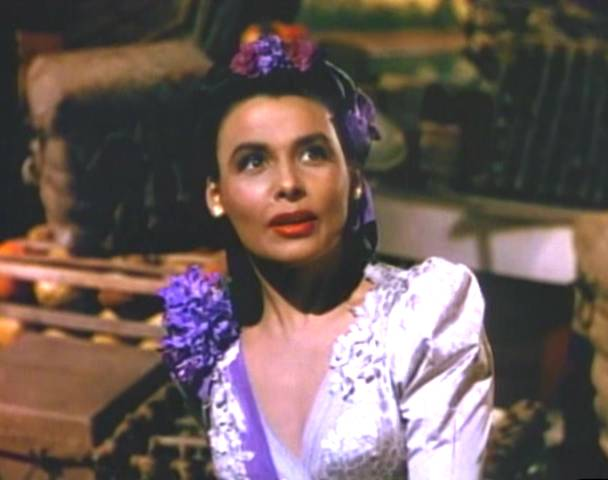
Lena Horne as Julie Laverne in a mini-production of Show Boat, singing "Can't Help Lovin' Dat Man"

The working title for the film was "As the Clouds Roll By". Gene Kelly was intended to play Kern, with Gloria DeHaven, Jacqueline White, Imogen Carpenter, and Jeanette MacDonald in major parts. None appeared in the film.

When the film started production in the fall of 1945, Judy Garland was signed as Broadway singer-dancer Marilyn Miller, having just returned to California after a long New York honeymoon with her new husband, director Vincente Minnelli. Soon after, Kern returned to New York toward the end of October and died in November 1945.

During the six months that it took to shoot the film, producer Arthur Freed had to find one director after another. Lemuel Ayers, a set designer, was scheduled to make his directorial debut on the film, but was replaced by Busby Berkeley late in August 1945. Meanwhile, Minnelli – who, it was rumored at the time, would be taking over the direction of the film – was shooting Garland's sequences even before the beginning of principal photography as she was pregnant and expected to give birth in March 1946; her shooting was completed on November 8, 1945. By the time full shooting began in the middle of December, Berkeley had been replaced by Henry Koster, who then was replaced after a short period by Richard Whorf. Whorf received the onscreen directorial credit. There was a break in production from some time in January 1946 to the middle of March of the same year.

The film includes two versions of "Ol' Man River": the first sung by Caleb Peterson and an African-American chorus as part of the Show Boat medley, and the second, a "crooner version" by Frank Sinatra, featured as the grand finale.

Barbette consulted on the creation of the film's circus sequence.

== Songs ==
- "Cotton Blossom" – MGM Studio Orchestra and Chorus
- "Where's the Mate for Me" – Tony Martin
- "Make Believe" – Kathryn Grayson/Tony Martin
- "Life Upon the Wicked Stage" – Virginia O'Brien/MGM Studio Orchestra and Chorus Girls
- "Can't Help Lovin' Dat Man" – Lena Horne
- "Ol' Man River" – Caleb Peterson/MGM Studio Orchestra and Chorus
- "Ka-Lu-a" – MGM Studio Orchestra
- "How'd You Like to Spoon with Me" – Angela Lansbury/MGM Studio Orchestra and Chorus
- "They Didn't Believe Me" – Dinah Shore
- "Till the Clouds Roll By" – June Allyson/Ray McDonald/MGM Studio Orchestra and Chorus
- "Leave It to Jane" – MGM Studio Orchestra and Chorus/June Allyson/Ray McDonald
- "Cleopatterer" – June Allyson/Ray McDonald/MGM Studio Orchestra and Chorus
- "Leave It to Jane" (Reprise) – MGM Studio Orchestra and Chorus/June Allyson/Ray McDonald
- "Look for the Silver Lining" – Judy Garland
- "Sunny" – Judy Garland/MGM Studio Orchestra and Chorus
- "Who?" – Judy Garland/MGM Studio Orchestra and Chorus
- "One More Dance" – Lucille Bremer (Dubbed by Trudy Erwin)
- "I Won't Dance" – Van Johnson/Lucille Bremer (dubbed by Trudy Erwin)
- "She Didn't Say Yes" – Lee and Lyn Wilde, aka "The Wilde Twins"
- "Smoke Gets in Your Eyes" – Cyd Charisse/Gower Champion
- "The Last Time I Saw Paris" – Dinah Shore
- "The Land Where the Good Songs Go" – Lucille Bremer (dubbed by Trudy Erwin)
- "Yesterdays" – MGM Studio Orchestra and Chorus
- "Long Ago (and Far Away)" – Kathryn Grayson
- "A Fine Romance" – Virginia O'Brien
- "All the Things You Are" – Tony Martin
- "Why Was I Born?" – Lena Horne
- "Ol' Man River" (Reprise/Finale) – Frank Sinatra/MGM Studio Orchestra and Chorus

== Surviving Judy Garland outtake ==
A video of an excised musical number survives from this film, but part of the soundtrack has been lost. Judy Garland, as Marilyn Miller, sings "D'Ya Love Me?" to two clowns in a circus setting, representing a scene from the Broadway musical Sunny. The clowns are played by Swedish clowns Jean and Rene Arnaut, known as the Arnaut Brothers. Although uncredited, they appear in the edited movie in the walk-around at the start of the Sunny circus.

== Soundtrack album ==
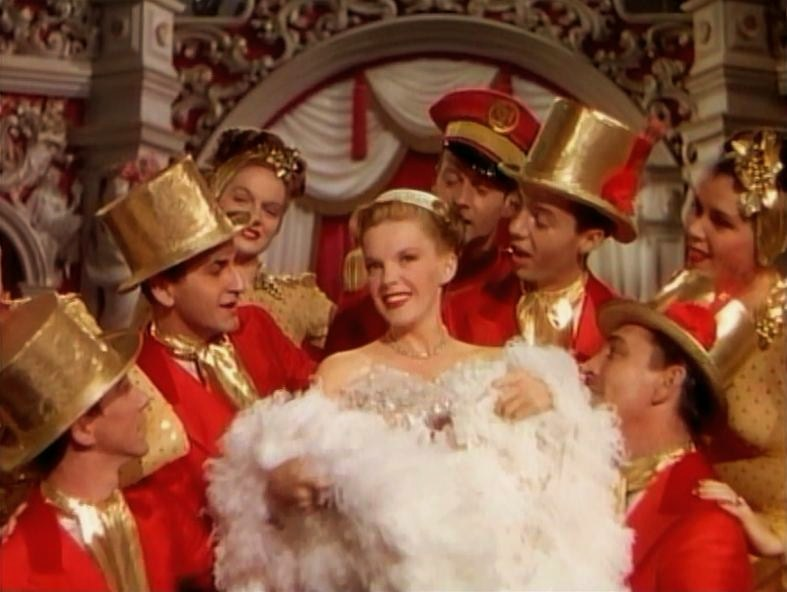
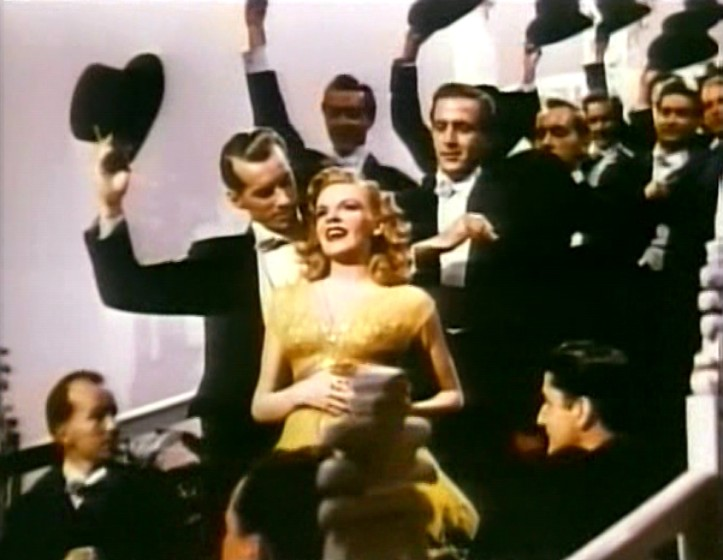
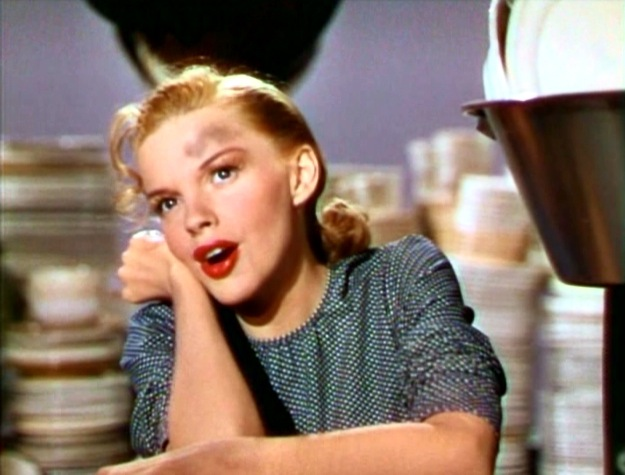
Garland as Marilyn Miller in scenes based on the musical Sunny, singing "Who?" (center) and "Look for the Silver Lining" (right)

The film was one of the early movies to have a soundtrack album released concurrently with it arriving in theaters. The soundtrack was produced by MGM Records, originally released as four 78-rpm records featuring various artists and songs from the film and cover artwork by Lennie Hayton. The album was released on LP. No official authorized version has yet been released on CD, but several unauthorized versions have appeared on the market. Rhino Entertainment currently owns the rights to issue an authorized CD of the soundtrack under license from Turner Entertainment; in the past, MCA Records and Sony Music Entertainment held such rights.

== Reception ==
=== Critical response ===
Bosley Crowther, reviewing the film for The New York Times, wrote:

Why did Metro ... have to cook up a thoroughly phoney yarn about the struggles of a chirpy young composer to carry the lovely songs of Jerry Kern? And why did it have to do it in such a hackneyed and sentimental way as to grate on the sensibilities of even the most affectionately disposed?

Variety differed, opening its satisfactory notice with "Why quibble about the story?" and likening the film to another such venture, Cary Grant's Night and Day. In a retrospective review, American film critic Pauline Kael wrote, "This monster thing, spawned at M-G-M, was meant to be the life of Jerome Kern."

On the review aggregator website Rotten Tomatoes, 100% of 6 critics' reviews are positive, with an average rating of 6.3/10.

=== Box office ===
The film earned $4,748,000 in the U.S. and Canada box offices and $1,976,000 in other markets, but because of its high cost, the profit was $732,000.

=== Accolades ===
The film is recognized by American Film Institute in these lists:

- 2006: AFI's Greatest Movie Musicals – Nominated

== Home media ==
The film is one of several MGM musicals – another being Royal Wedding – that entered the public domain 28 years after production because the studio did not renew the copyright registration. As such, it is one of the more widely circulated MGM musicals on home video. Warner Home Video gave it its first fully restored DVD release on April 25, 2006.

== Related films ==
Till the Clouds Roll By was the first in a series of MGM biopics about Broadway composers: It was followed by Words and Music about Rodgers and Hart in 1948, Three Little Words about Kalmar and Ruby in 1950, and Deep in My Heart about Sigmund Romberg in 1954.
