= Sam Hood =

Australian photographer and photojournalist

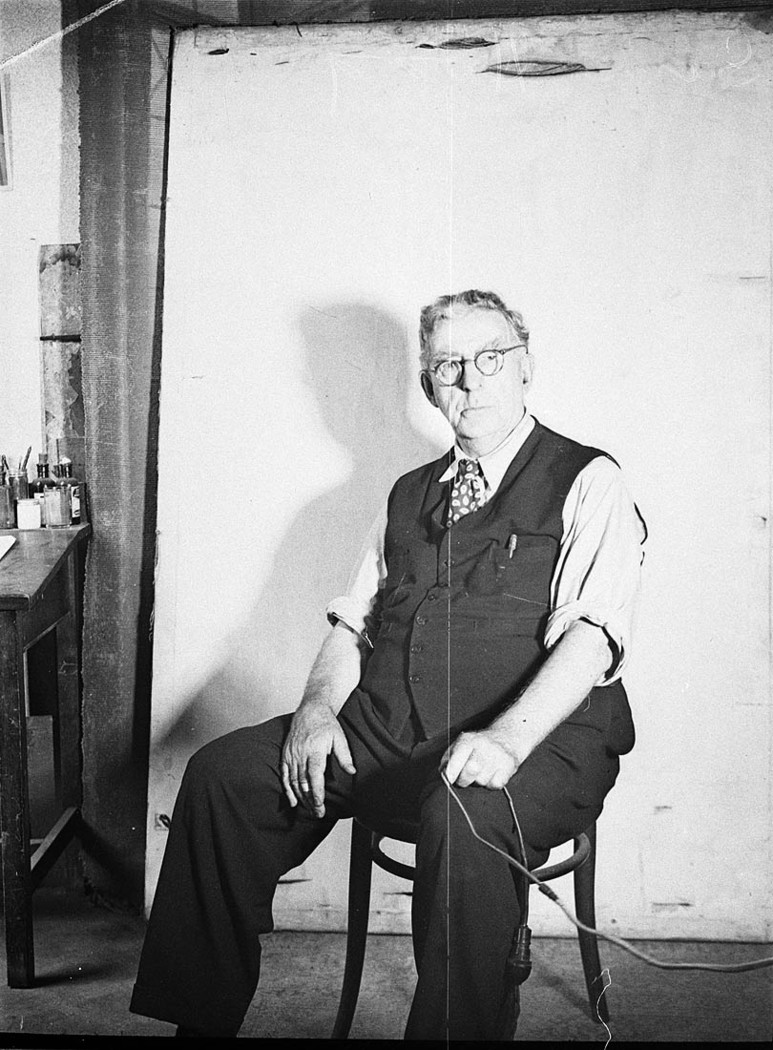
- Self portrait, c. 1935
- Born: Samuel John Hood; 20 August 1872; Glenelg, Adelaide, Colony of South Australia
- Died: 8 June 1953 (aged 80); Sydney, New South Wales, Australia
- Resting place: Rookwood Cemetery
- Known for: Photography; photojournalism

Samuel John Hood (20 August 1872 – 8 June 1953) was an Australian photographer and photojournalist born in South Australia whose career spanned from the 1880s to the 1950s.

== Early years ==
Sam Hood was born at Glenelg, South Australia, his father John Hood was an artist who had a studio at Glenelg. His grandfather was also an artist.

== Career ==
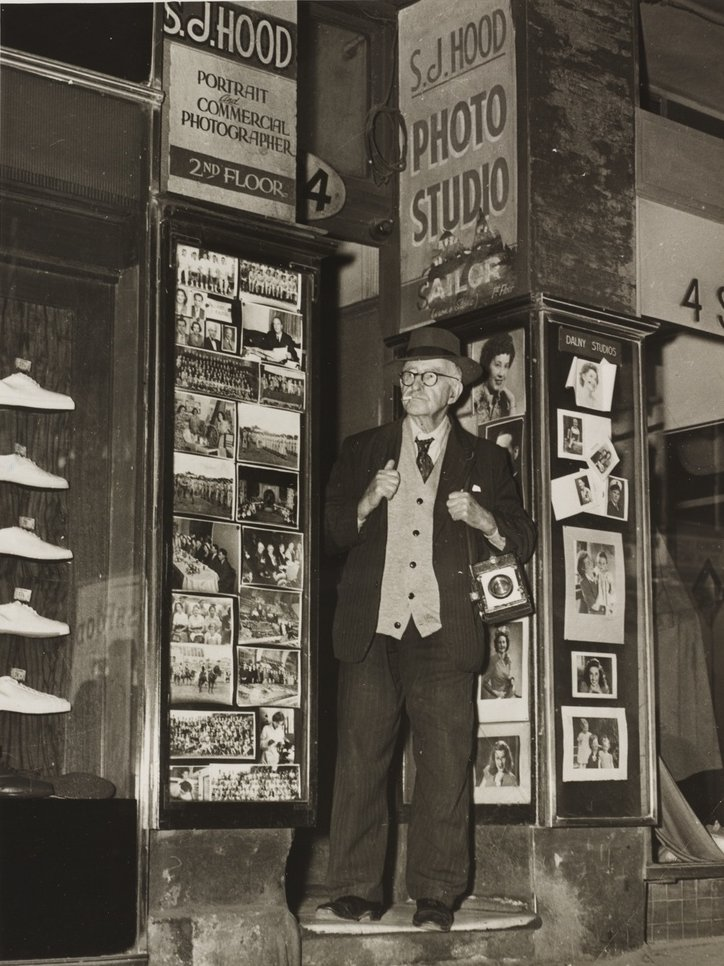
Hood outside his "Dalny Studios", 124 Pitt Street, Sydney, 1953 (taken three weeks before his death)

=== Early career ===
Hood came to Sydney in 1899 and opened a photographic studion specialising in portraiture and weddings. Hood supplemented this income by selling framed images of sailing vessels to their crews upon arrival in Sydney Harbour. Many of these negatives are now held by the Australian National Maritime Museum, Sydney. He also took photographs at the Dore Studio in Queen Victoria Markets.

=== Press photographer ===
In 1918, he acquired the Dalny Studio at 124 Pitt Street, and began to expand his business into press photography, providing photographs for The Sydney Mail, The Australasian, the Daily Guardian, the Daily Telegraph Pictorial, the Labor Daily, The Sun, the Daily News, and The Sydney Morning Herald. Press photography increasingly came to dominate his business, and in 1934 he joined the Labor Daily for a short time as a full-time photographer, engaging other staff to look after his studio. At the beginning of Hood's career photography in newspapers was a novelty, and although the technology to reproduce half tone illustrations was in use by 1880 the Australian papers and in particular wood engravers whose job it was to illustrate articles resisted the new process. The Sydney Morning Herald did not reproduce a photograph until 1908. Sam Hood is acknowledged as a trailblazer in this genre - becoming adept at capturing the sensational, trivial and in particular sporting moments with his camera.

=== Commercial photographer ===
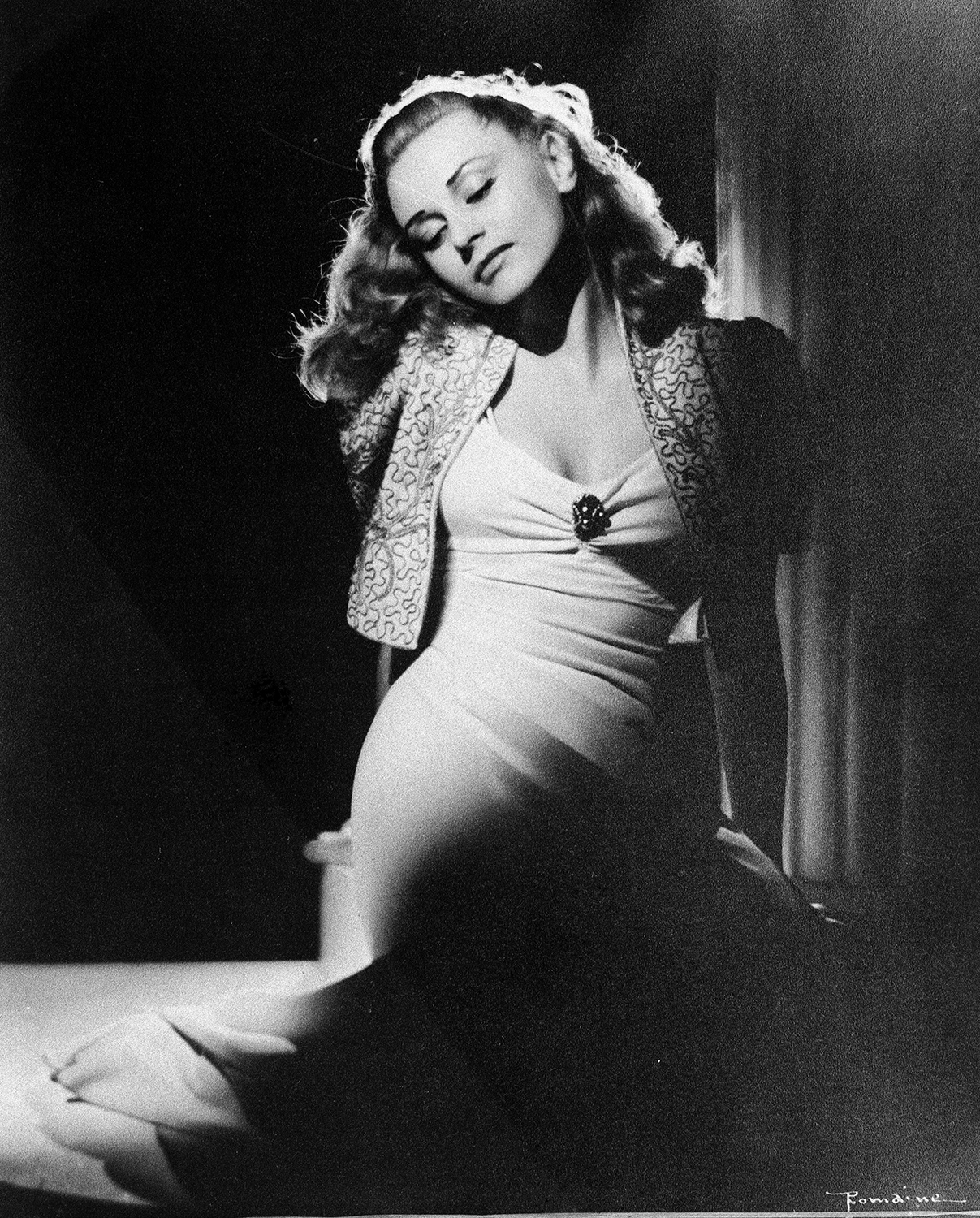
Nina Verchinina, from Colonel de Basil's "Original Ballet Russe", 1939-1940

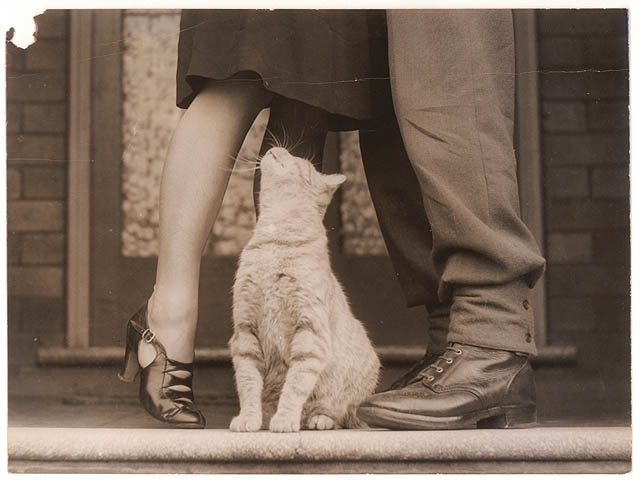
A soldier's goodbye, with Bobby the cat. Photo by Sam Hood ca. 1942.

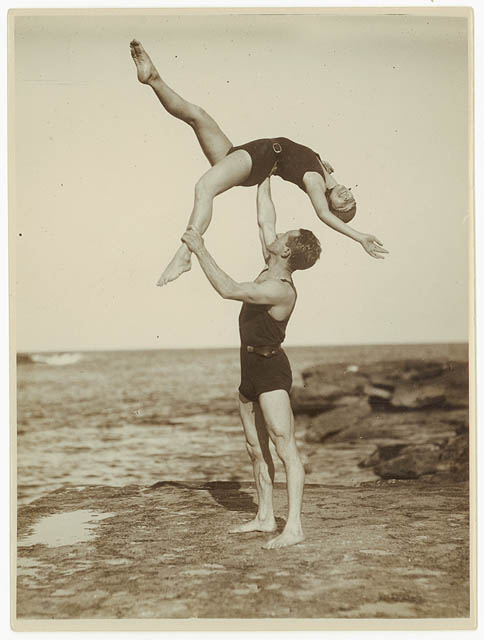
Acrobats, Sydney, 1930s Sam Hood (Possibly John M. Hendry, bodybuilder and physical culture writer.)

By the mid-1930s most newspapers employed their own photographers, and Hood's commissions from the papers began to decline. He sought other kinds of commissions, and won a number of long term advertising and commercial contracts. He contributed a number of photographs of Sydney buildings and streets to Building, Construction and Australasian Engineer during the late 1930s and early 1940s.

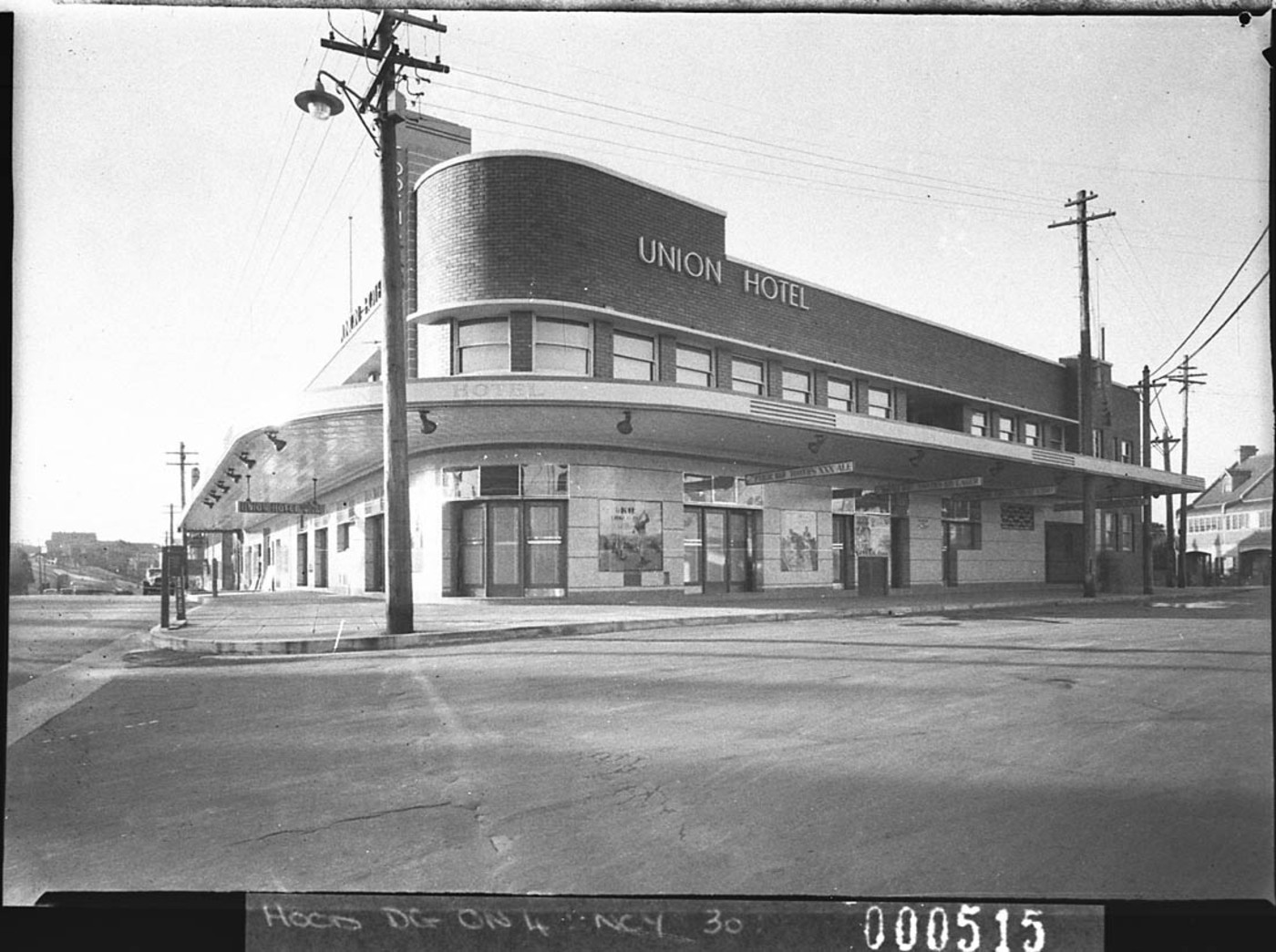
Union Hotel built circa 1933 & remodelled 1939 along Pacific highway.

Hood worked Ministry of News and Information service and documented the armed service during World War Two and had had extensive contacts in the entertainment industry, who called upon him to document celebrity events and stars, as well as theatre advertising. Throughout his career he worked at the stock-in-trade for commercial photographers: portraits, weddings and even funerals.

A number of photographers worked for Dalny Studio: some of these include Ernie Bowen, Gus Daley, Jack Lazern, Lethington Maitland as well as Sam's own children Gladys and Ted.

== Final years ==
Hood moved to Glenbrook in the Blue Mountains in around the year 1949. He died after collapsing on the street in Eddy Avenue, Sydney, while on his way to catch a train home. When he died in 1953, he was survived by his wife and son Albert who lived in Sutherland, Sydney, William who lived in Perth, Western Australia, Edgar (Ted) and Noel who also lived in Glenbrook as well as two daughters. He was cremated at Rookwood Cemetery.

== Collected work ==
- Sam Hood : photographic collection, 1916-ca.1955, 44,800 negatives, 7,309 photographic prints, 3 boxes of textual material, held by the State Library of New South Wales and purchased from Gladys Hood in 1972.
- Sydney exposures : through the eyes of Sam Hood and his studio, 1925–1950.

== See also ==
- Ted Hood (photographer)
