= Sally (musical) =

Musical by Jerome Kern, Clifford Grey and Guy Bolton

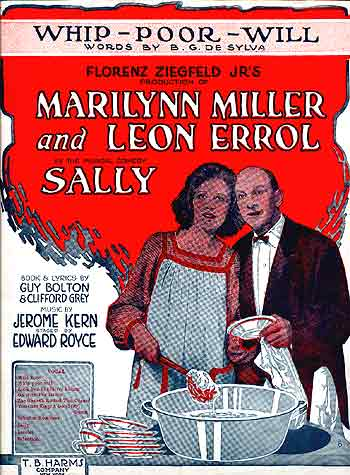
- Sheet music cover
- Music: Jerome Kern; Victor Herbert
- Lyrics: Clifford Grey; Buddy De Sylva; P. G. Wodehouse; Anne Caldwell
- Book: Guy Bolton
- Productions: 1920 Broadway; 1921 West End; 1923 Australia; 1923 Broadway revival 1942 West End revival 1948 Broadway revival

Sally is a musical comedy with music by Jerome Kern, lyrics by Clifford Grey and book by Guy Bolton (inspired by the 19th century show, Sally in our Alley), with additional lyrics by Buddy De Sylva, Anne Caldwell and P. G. Wodehouse. The plot hinges on a mistaken identity: Sally, a waif, is a dishwasher at the Alley Inn in New York City. She poses as a famous foreign ballerina and rises to fame (and finds love) through joining the Ziegfeld Follies. There is a rags to riches story, a ballet as a centrepiece, and a wedding as a finale. "Look for the Silver Lining" continues to be one of Kern's most familiar songs. The song is lampooned by another song, "Look for a Sky of Blue," in Rick Besoyan's satirical 1959 musical Little Mary Sunshine.

The piece was first produced in 1920 on Broadway by Florenz Ziegfeld, and ran for 570 performances, one of the longest runs on Broadway up to that time. The show was designed as a debut star vehicle for Marilyn Miller. It had a successful London run and was revived several times on Broadway and in the West End, although it has had few productions since the 1950s. The musical was adapted into a 1925 silent film and a 1929 musical film.

== Background and original production ==
Kern, Bolton, and Wodehouse had collaborated on a number of musical comedies at the Princess Theatre. The story combined the innocence of these earlier "Princess musicals" with the lavishness of the "Ziegfeld Follies" formula. The score recycles some material from previous Kern shows, including "Look for the Silver Lining" and "Whip-poor-will" (with lyrics by De Sylva, from the flop "Zip Goes a Million"); "The Lorelei" (lyrics by Anne Caldwell); and "You Can't Keep a Good Girl Down" and "The Church 'Round the Corner" (lyrics by Wodehouse). Grey supplied the lyrics for the few new songs in the score. At the request of Ziegfeld, Victor Herbert was engaged to write the music to "The Butterfly Ballet" in Act Three.

The musical was originally produced by Florenz Ziegfeld, opening on December 21, 1920 at the New Amsterdam Theatre on Broadway. It ran for 570 performances, which was one of the longest runs on Broadway up to that time. By the time it closed in 1924 (including revivals), it would prove to be among the top five money makers of the 1920s. The show was designed as the musical comedy debut of Marilyn Miller, a 22-year-old Ziegfeld Follies girl. Miller would continue to be a star on Broadway until her death in 1936.

== Roles and original cast ==
The Butterfly Ballet

- "Pops", proprietor of the Alley Inn, New York – Alfred P. James
- Rosalind Rafferty, a manicurist – Mary Hay
- Madame Nookerova's maid – Mary Hay
- Sascha, Violinist at the Alley Inn – Jacques Rebiroff
- Otis Hooper, a theatrical agent – Walter Catlett
- Mrs. Ten Broek, a settlement worker – Dolores
- Sally of the Alley, a foundling – Marilyn Miller
- Madame Nookerova, a Wild Rose – Marilyn Miller
- Premier Star of the Follies – Marilyn Miller
- Connie, a waiter at the Alley Inn – Leon Errol
- Duke of Czechogovinia – Leon Errol
- Miss New York, a niece – Agatha Dehussey
- Admiral Travers, a gay one – Phil Ryley
- Blair Farquar, an only son – Irving Fisher
- Jimmie Spelvin – Stanley Ridges
- Billy Porter – Wade Boothe
- Harry Burton – Jack Barker

== Musical numbers ==
Scene from the London production

Act I

- Opening and Violin Solo
- The Night Time – Jimmie Spelvin and Ensemble (lyrics by Grey)
- On with the Dance – Otis Hooper, Rosalind, Betty and Harry Burton (lyrics by Grey)
- On with the Dance (Encore) – Otis Hooper, Rosalind, Betty and Harry Burton
- Joan of Arc ("You Can't Keep a Good Girl Down") – Sally of the Alley and Foundlings (lyrics by Grey & Wodehouse)
- Look for the Silver Lining – Sally and Blair Farquar (lyrics by De Sylva)
- Look for the Silver Lining (reprise) – Sally, Duke of Czechogovinio, Boys and Girls
- Sally – Blair and Ensemble (lyrics by Grey)
- Dance – Sally
- Finale Act One – Sally, Duke of Czechogovinio, Otis Hooper, Rosalind and Company

Act II

- Opening Act II: The Social Game – Jimmie and Ensemble
- Wild Rose – Sally and Diplomats (lyrics by Grey)
- (On the Banks of) The Schnitza Komisski – Duke of Czechogovinio and Ensemble (lyrics by Grey)
- Schnitza Komisski Dance (Pzcherkatrotsky) – Duke of Czechogovinio
- Whip-poor-will – Sally and Blair (lyrics by De Sylva)
- The Lorelei – Otis Hooper, Rosalind and Jimmie (lyrics by Anne Caldwell)
- The Church Around the Corner – Rosalind and Otis (lyrics by Grey & Wodehouse)
- Finale Act II: – Entire Company

Act III

- Land of Butterflies (ballet) (music By Victor Herbert)
- Wild Rose (reprise) – Sally and Boys
- Finale – Dear Little Church 'Round the Corner

== Subsequent productions ==
The musical enjoyed a successful production in 1921 in London at the Winter Garden Theatre, starring British musical comedy veterans George Grossmith Jr. and Leslie Henson, which ran for 387 performances.

It also played well in 1923 in Australia, produced by the J. C. Williamson company. There were Broadway revivals in 1923 (at the New Amsterdam Theatre) and 1948 and London revivals in 1942 (at Prince's Theatre) and 1952 (Oxford New Theatre). Other productions included a 1944 LACLO Production in Los Angeles, California and a 1988 concert production Off-Broadway at the Academy Theatre.

== Adaptations ==
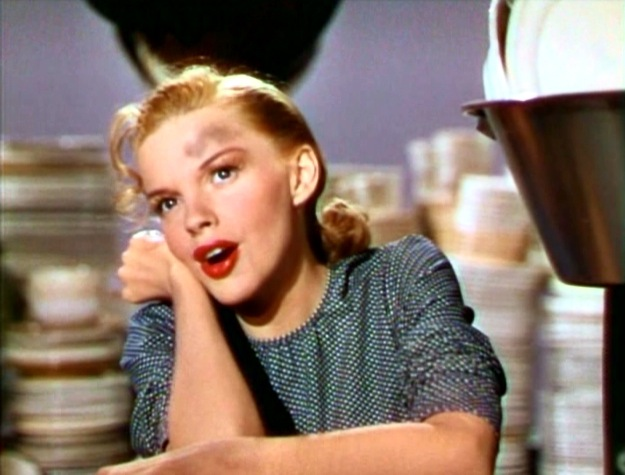
Judy Garland, as Miller, singing "Look for the Silver Lining" in Till the Clouds Roll By (1946), a film loosely based on Kern's life and work

A 1925 silent romantic comedy film of the same name starred Colleen Moore and was directed by Alfred E. Green, produced by Moore's husband John McCormick. The screenplay was adapted by June Mathis.

The 1929 musical film version was only the third all talking all-color feature movie ever made. It retains three of Kern's songs ("Look for the Silver Lining", "Sally", and "Wild Rose"). The rest of the music newly written for the film by Al Dubin and Joe Burke. Miller was hired by the Warner Brothers to reprise her role at an extravagant sum (reportedly $1,000 an hour for a total of $100,000). The film was nominated for an Academy Award for Best Art Direction by Jack Okey in 1930.

Sally was presented on The Railroad Hour April 6, 1953. The 30-minute radio adaptation starred Gordon MacRae and Lucille Norman.

== References and sources ==
Sources

- Description of the musical
- Synopsis and other information about the musical
