= The Lieutenant (musical) =

- Playbill cover from 1975 Broadway production
- Music: Gene Curty; Nitra Scharfman; Chuck Strand
- Lyrics: Gene Curty; Nitra Scharfman; Chuck Strand
- Book: Gene Curty; Nitra Scharfman; Chuck Strand
- Productions: 1975 Broadway

The Lieutenant is a rock opera with book, music and lyrics by Gene Curty, Nitra Scharfman and Chuck Strand. The musical concerns the court martial of Lieutenant William Calley during the Vietnam War and ran on Broadway in 1975.

== Production ==
The Lieutenant was originally produced by Queens Playhouse, (Flushing Meadows, New York) in 1974 by Joseph S. Kutrzeba, who started the Playhouse. Alan Eichler was the press representative.

The original Broadway production of The Lieutenant, directed by William Martin and choreographed by Dennis Dennehy opened at the Lyceum Theatre on March 9, 1975, and closed on March 16, 1975, after nine performances and seven previews. The cast featured Eddie Mekka and was produced by Joseph S. Kutrzeba and Spofford J. Beadle.

The Lieutenant was nominated for four Tony Awards including Best Musical, Best Book of a Musical, Best Original Score and Best Actor in a Musical.

Producer and Holocaust survivor Joseph Kutrzeba said of the reason he decided to produce The Lieutenant was "The show meant a lot to me on human values. I think the theme is one of cardinal importance to our times: The concept of obedience versus exercising one's own conscience." The Philadelphia Inquirer September 3, 1974

In 1994 an adaptation of The Lieutenant was performed under the title "...One of the Good Guys" by Israeli actor Meir Vardi and David Bolander at the Sanford Meisner Theatre in New York City.

The Lieutenant was performed in September 2023 as part of the Off-Broadway York Theatre's Musicals in Mufti series.

== Overview ==
The show poses the question: Where does the guilt lie for the My Lai massacre of civilians in 1968 Vietnam? Does it reside solely in the person of The Lieutenant, who gave the order to "waste them"? Or perhaps in the larger military itself, where wars are planned, body counts are calculated, and inconvenient casualties are sometimes scrubbed from the record? Or just maybe the seeds for deeds like My Lai are latent in the very fabric of the human race, and once in a while the perfect storm of events allows for something terrible like this to happen?

The use of music follows the approach of Brecht, whereby the songs comment on themes and issues of the play.

In August 2016, Miles Kreuger, president of The Institute for the American Musical in Los Angeles, California, accepted the script, score, libretto, reviews and playbill of The Lieutenant into their archives.

== Original Broadway cast ==
- Eddie Mekka starred as The Lieutenant.
- Steven Boockvor – Soldier in "C" Company
- Gene Curty – Judge, OCS Sergeant
- Chet D'Elia – First General
- Gordon Grody – Defense Attorney
- Walt Hunter – Captain
- Clark James – Soldier in "C" Company
- Dan Kruger – Soldier in "C" Company
- James "Jim" Litten – Sergeant, Soldier "C" Company, Clergyman and First Reporter
- Donald Rayson McGrath – Chaplain and First Congressman
- Jim-Patrick McMahon – Soldier in "C" Company
- Eugene Moose – Second General
- Joel Powers – Recruiting Sergeant, Senator
- Joseph Pugliese – Soldier in "C" Company
- Burt Rodriguez – Soldier in "C" Company, Second Congressman, Prosecutor
- Alan K. Siegel – New Recruit
- Jo Speros – Sole female, Third Reporter
- Danny Taylor – Third General
- Tom Tofel – G.I., Second Reporter, Soldier in "C" Company

== Musicians ==
- Mark Cianfrani on Lead Guitar
- John Angelori on Rhythm Guitar
- Alan Bowin on Organ
- Joe DiCarlo on Drums
- James Marino on Bass Guitar
- Chuck Strand on Piano.

== Recording ==
The cast album was recorded in 1975 but never officially released.

== Songs ==
- The Indictment – Lieutenant and Judge
- Join the Army – Lieutenant, Recruiting Sergeant and Recruits
- Look for the Men With Potential – Generals
- Kill – OCS Sergeant
- I Don't Want to Go Over to Vietnam – Lieutenant and "C" Company
- Eulogy – Chaplain
- At 0700 Tomorrow – Captain and "C" Company
- Massacre – Captain, Lieutenant, "C" Company and Vietnamese
- Something's Gone Wrong – Captain and Lieutenant
- Twenty-Eight – Generals, Captain and Lieutenant
- Let's Believe in the Captain – Generals
- Final Report – First General
- I Will Make Things Happen – G.I.
- He Wants to Put the Army in Jail – Senator, 1st & 2nd Congressmen and Clergyman
- There's No Other Solution – Generals
- I'm Going Home – Lieutenant and "C" Company
- We've Chosen You, Lieutenant – Generals
- The Star of This War – Reporters and Lieutenant
- On Trial for My Life – Lieutenant
- The Conscience of a Nation – Prosecutor
- Damned No Matter How He Turned – Defense Attorney
- On Trial for My Life (Reprise) – Lieutenant
- The Verdict – Judge and Jurors
- Finale – New Recruit, Recruiting Sergeant and Company

== Critical response ==
The musical was described by Clive Barnes in his New York Times review as "extremely well staged" a "rock opera", and "it works very well indeed".

He also mentioned in The Morning News that the Lieutenant is "attractive and supportive" and there is "never a dull moment"

Ernest Leogrande of the New York News Service felt that "they have two of the essentials for any musical show: telling lyrics and strong melodies".

The Long Island Press said "If you never see another show, you must see this one"

== Awards and nominations ==
=== Original Broadway production ===
Year	Award	Category	Nominee	Result
1975	Tony Award	Best Musical		Nominated
1975	Tony Award	Best Book of a Musical	Gene Curty, Nitra Scharfman and Chuck Strand	Nominated
1975	Tony Award	Best Original Score	Gene Curty, Nitra Scharfman and Chuck Strand	Nominated
1975	Tony Award	Best Performance by a Leading Actor in a Musical	Eddie Mekka	Nominated
1975	Drama Desk Award	Outstanding Musical		Nominated
1975	Drama Desk Award	Outstanding Music and Lyrics	Gene Curty, Nitra Scharfman and Chuck Strand	Nominated
1975	Drama Desk Award	Outstanding Actor in a Musical	Eddie Mekka	Nominated
1975	Drama Desk Award	Outstanding Director of a Musical	William Martin	Nominated
1975	Drama Desk Award	Outstanding Choreography	Dennis Dennehy	Nominated
