= Mis'ry's Comin' Aroun =

Mis'ry's Comin' Aroun' is a once-neglected song from the 1927 musical Show Boat by Jerome Kern and Oscar Hammerstein II. It was cut from the production during the Washington D.C. tryout on the orders of producer Florenz Ziegfeld, supposedly because it was one of the factors that made the show too long (it ran four-and-a-half hours when it premiered). However, musical theatre historian Miles Kreuger and conductor John McGlinn, also suggest that it was the dark, dramatic tone of the piece that most concerned Ziegfeld. Kern was reportedly so incensed by the deletion of "Mis'ry's Comin' Aroun'" that he made it the principal motif of Show Boats original overture and asked orchestrator Robert Russell Bennett to work sections of it into the background music as well, where it is now played by the orchestra during some of the dialogue scenes involving the mixed race actress Julie La Verne.

The song, which runs about five minutes, is an African-American lament of foreboding and impending doom sung by Queenie, the cook, and the African-American chorus, and, in the show, drives Julie, who has been passing as white, to near hysteria. It is supposed to be sung at the beginning of the rehearsal scene, which contains the sequence in which Julie and her white husband are revealed to be guilty of "miscegenation" by the local sheriff, who tries to arrest them. A fragment of the song's slow section is still actually sung by the black chorus during the scene, as well as in the 1936 film version of the show, but it does not build up to the fever pitch that Kern and Hammerstein originally conceived.

In the 1951 film version of the show, an offscreen chorus hums the slow section of the song as Julie and Steve leave the boat, but the words are not sung. The song is not heard at all in the 1929 part-talkie film version.

The complete song was not restored to the show's score until EMI's exhaustive 1988 3-CD recording of the show's score with its original lyrics, orchestrations and vocal arrangements, and performed onstage complete for the first time since the Washington D.C. tryout of Show Boat when producer Harold Prince included it in the 1994 Broadway revival.
