= Chuck Strand =

American dramatist

Charles Strand is an American theater composer and lyricist. Strand, along with Gene Curty and Nitra Scharfman, wrote the music, book and lyrics to the Tony Award and Drama Desk Award nominated rock opera The Lieutenant. He also arranged the music and was the musical director for the show.

Strand also wrote the music and lyrics to the Off-Off-Broadway show A Naughty Knight which was produced at The Duke Theatre on 42nd Street in New York and performed by the Jewish Repertory Theatre in 2001.
