= William Martin (director) =

American theatre director, playwright, and acting coach

William Martin, also known as Bill Martin, (born William George Martin, Jr., September 6, 1937 – November 16, 2017) was an American theatre director, playwright, and acting coach. He was nominated for the 1975 Drama Desk Award for Outstanding Direction of a Musical for his work on the rock opera The Lieutenant.

== Biography ==
The son of William George Martin, Sr., William George Martin, Jr. was born on September 6, 1937 in Pueblo, Colorado. He grew up in Denver. After graduating from high school, he enlisted in the United States Navy in 1956.

Upon finishing his military service, Martin became a student at Bob Jones University (BJU) when he was 21 years old. He originally pursued studies in counseling and in Christian ministry at BJU; also studying theatre at BJU which at that time centered its drama program around the works of William Shakespeare. He earned both Bachelor of Arts (1962) and a Master of Arts (1964) degrees from BJU and became a member of its teaching staff. He spent nine years teaching classes and directing Shakespeare plays at BJU.

Martin pursued doctoral studies in theatre at the University of Wisconsin (UW); earning his Ph.D. in 1971. While at UW he concurrently worked as a substitute teacher for Madison Public Schools and as a teaching and project assistant at UW. He was a member of the English faculty at Wilkes College (WC) in Pennsylvania in 1971-1972. In 1972 Hurricane/Tropical Storm Agnes flooded much of the campus of WC. Martin lost all of his belongings in this disaster, and much of the college was destroyed which led to his decision to leave the school and move to New York City.

After moving to New York, Martin began his professional directing career as a stage director for the Metropolitan Opera in the 1970s. At the Met he directed productions starring Jerome Hines and Eleanor Steber. In 1973 he directed a production of The Student Prince at Lakewood Musical Playhouse in Barnesville, Pennsylvania. He directed the Broadway production of the rock opera The Lieutenant which opened in 1974. On the day that the production closed it was announced that the show was nominated for five Tony Awards; making it impossible for the voters to view the show. Martin was nominated for the Drama Desk Award for Outstanding Direction of a Musical for his work on The Lieutenant. Around this same time he served as Edward Albee's assistant director for the 1975 Broadway production of Seascape.

In 1982 Martin was a visiting professor in the theatre department at Auburn University. He subsequently taught on the theatre faculty at the University of Virginia, and served as vice-president of the American Lyric Theater during the 1980s. He continued to work as a director; staging more than 200 productions of both musical and non-musical theatre during his career. These included shows both on and Off-Broadway, and in regional theatres and at universities. Some of the performers who appeared in shows he directed include Eartha Kitt, George Grizzard, Jessica Tandy, Hume Cronyn, Deborah Kerr, Frank Langella, Barry Bostwick, Salome Jens, Barbara Barrie, Jason Alexander, Maureen Anderman, Patricia Richardson, Pamela Meyers, and Dick Shawn.

Martin staged the Glimmerglass Opera's 2000 production of John Philip Sousa's The Glass Blowers; an operetta he helped reconstruct from surviving fragments of the original libretto by Leonard Liebling. In the 2000s he was the manager of Applause Books until leaving to join the staff of the Drama Book Shop, Inc. in 2007. A gay man, he married his partner, director and producer Tom Gustafson, on February 5, 2012.

William Martin died while in hospice care on November 16, 2017 at the age of 80.
