= Drama Desk Award for Outstanding Direction of a Musical =

Broadway Theatre Award

- Awarded for: Outstanding Direction of a Musical
- Location: New York City
- Country: United States
- Presented by: Drama Desk
- First award: 1975
- Currently held by: Lear deBessonet, Ragtime (2026)
- Website: dramadesk.org (defunct)

The Drama Desk Award for Outstanding Direction of a Musical is an annual award presented by Drama Desk in recognition of achievements in theatre across collective Broadway, off-Broadway and off-off-Broadway productions in New York City. The awards were established in 1955, with the Drama Desk Award for Outstanding Director being presented each year to a director from any play or musical production. Starting in 1975, the singular director's award was replaced by separate play and musical categories.

Harold Prince holds the record for most wins in the category, with four, followed closely by Tommy Tune and Michael Mayer with three wins each. Prince is also tied with John Doyle for the most nominations in the category, both with eight.

== Winners and nominees ==
Key

and bold indicates the winner.

=== 1970s ===
Year	Director	Production
1975
1975	**Arthur Laurents**	**Gypsy**
1975	Geoffrey Holder	The Wiz
1975	Sue Lawless	In Gay Company
1975	William Martin	The Lieutenant
1975	Joel Zwick	Dance with Me
1976
1976	**Michael Bennett**	**A Chorus Line**
1976	Jerry Adler	My Fair Lady
1976	Richard Foreman	The Threepenny Opera
1976	Gerald Freedman	The Robber Bridegroom
1976	Harold Prince	Pacific Overtures
1977
1977	**Martin Charnin**	**Annie**
1977	Gerald Freedman	The Robber Bridegroom
1977	Jack O'Brien	Porgy and Bess
1977	Gene Saks	I Love My Wife
1977	Tommy Tune	The Club
1978
1978	**Peter Masterson and Tommy Tune**	**The Best Little Whorehouse in Texas**
1978	Stephen Schwartz	Working
1978	Elizabeth Swados	Runaways
1979
1979	**Harold Prince**	**Sweeney Todd: The Demon Barber of Fleet Street**
1979	Michael Bennett	Ballroom

=== 1980s ===
Year	Director	Production
1980
1980	**Harold Prince**	**Evita**
1980	Walton Jones	1940's Radio Hour
1980	Joe Layton	Barnum
1980	Gary Pearle	Tintypes
1981
1981	**Wilford Leach**	**The Pirates of Penzance**
1981	Arthur Faria	Lena Horne: The Lady and Her Music
1982
1982	**Tommy Tune**	**Nine**
1982	Michael Bennett	Dreamgirls
1982	Tony Tanner	Joseph and the Amazing Technicolor Dreamcoat
1983
1983	**George Abbott**	**On Your Toes**
1983	Howard Ashman	Little Shop of Horrors
1984
1984	**James Lapine**	**Sunday in the Park with George**
1984	A.J. Antoon	The Rink
1984	Jacques Levy	Doonesbury
1985	—N/a	
1986
1986	**Wilford Leach**	**The Mystery of Edwin Drood**
1986	Andre Ernotte	Goblin Market
1986	Bob Fosse	Big Deal
1986	Bob Fosse	Sweet Charity
1986	Paul Lazarus	Personals
1987
1987	**Mike Ockrent**	**Me and My Girl**
1987	Barry Harman	Olympus on My Mind
1988
1988	**Harold Prince**	**The Phantom of the Opera**
1988	James Lapine	Into the Woods
1988	Harold Prince	Cabaret
1988	Jerry Zaks	Anything Goes
1989	—N/a	

=== 1990s ===
Year	Director	Production
1990
1990	**Tommy Tune**	**Grand Hotel**
1990	Michael Blakemore	City of Angels
1990	James Hammerstein	The Sound of Music
1991
1991	**Scott Ellis**	**And the World Goes 'Round**
1991	**Scott Ellis**	**A Little Night Music**
1991	Lisa Peterson	The Waves
1991	Susan H. Schulman	The Secret Garden
1991	Jerry Zaks	Assassins
1992
1992	**Jerry Zaks**	**Guys and Dolls**
1992	Gerald Gutierrez	The Most Happy Fella
1992	Mike Ockrent	Crazy for You
1992	George C. Wolfe	Jelly's Last Jam
1993
1993	**Des McAnuff**	**The Who's Tommy**
1993	Michael Leeds	Hello Muddah, Hello Fadduh
1993	Michael Maggio	Wings
1993	Joel Paley	Ruthless!
1994
1994	**Nicholas Hytner**	**Carousel**
1994	Graciela Daniele	Hello Again
1994	Scott Ellis	She Loves Me
1994	Andre Gilbert Ernotte	Christina Alberta's Father
1994	James Lapine	Passion
1995
1995	**Harold Prince**	**Show Boat**
1995	Christopher Ashley	Das Barbecü
1995	Michael Mayer	America Dreaming
1995	Trevor Nunn	Sunset Boulevard
1996
1996	**Christopher Renshaw**	**The King and I**
1996	Graciela Daniele	Chronicle of a Death Foretold
1996	Andre Gilbert Ernotte	Bed and Sofa
1996	Michael Greif	Rent
1996	Tina Landau	Floyd Collins
1996	George C. Wolfe	Bring in 'da Noise, Bring in 'da Funk
1997
1997	**Walter Bobbie**	**Chicago**
1997	Michael Blakemore	The Life
1997	Scott Ellis	Steel Pier
1997	Susan H. Schulman	Violet
1997	Mark Waldrop	Howard Crabtree's When Pigs Fly
1998
1998	**Julie Taymor**	**The Lion King**
1998	Scott Ellis	1776
1998	Frank Galati	Ragtime
1998	Sam Mendes and Rob Marshall	Cabaret
1999
1999	**Matthew Bourne**	**Swan Lake**
1999	Graciela Daniele	A New Brain
1999	Richard Maltby, Jr. and Ann Reinking	Fosse
1999	Michael Mayer	You're a Good Man, Charlie Brown
1999	Harold Prince	Parade

=== 2000s ===
Year	Director	Production
2000
2000	**Michael Blakemore**	**Kiss Me, Kate**
2000	Gabriel Barre	The Wild Party
2000	Susan Stroman	Contact
2000	Susan Stroman	The Music Man
2001
2001	**Susan Stroman**	**The Producers**
2001	Christopher Ashley	The Rocky Horror Show
2001	Wilfredo Medina	The Bubbly Black Girl Sheds Her Chameleon Skin
2001	Jack O'Brien	The Full Monty
2001	John Rando	Urinetown
2001	Scott Schwartz	Bat Boy: The Musical
2002
2002	**Michael Mayer**	**Thoroughly Modern Millie**
2002	Nicholas Hytner	Sweet Smell of Success
2002	James Lapine	Into the Woods
2002	Trevor Nunn	Oklahoma!
2002	Scott Schwartz	Tick, Tick... Boom!
2002	George C. Wolfe	Elaine Stritch: At Liberty
2003
2003	**Jack O'Brien**	**Hairspray**
2003	James Lapine	Amour
2003	David Leveaux	Nine
2003	Baz Luhrmann	La bohème
2003	Joe Mantello	A Man of No Importance
2003	Twyla Tharp	Movin' Out
2004
2004	**Joe Mantello**	**Wicked**
2004	Jeff Calhoun	Big River
2004	Pamela Hunt	The Musical of Musicals: The Musical
2004	Joe Mantello	Assassins
2004	Kathleen Marshall	Wonderful Town
2004	George C. Wolfe	Caroline, or Change
2005
2005	**James Lapine**	**The 25th Annual Putnam County Spelling Bee**
2005	Matthew Bourne	Play Without Words
2005	Jack Cummings III	The Audience
2005	Mark Dornford-May	The Mysteries
2005	Mike Nichols	Spamalot
2005	Bartlett Sher	The Light in the Piazza
2006
2006	**John Doyle**	**Sweeney Todd: The Demon Barber of Fleet Street**
2006	Michael Greif	Grey Gardens
2006	Daniel Finzi Pasca	Rain
2006	Des McAnuff	Jersey Boys
2006	Casey Nicholaw	The Drowsy Chaperone
2006	Kathleen Marshall	The Pajama Game
2007
2007	**Michael Mayer**	**Spring Awakening**
2007	John Doyle	Company
2007	Thomas Kail	In the Heights
2007	Jerry Mitchell	Legally Blonde
2007	Harold Prince	LoveMusik
2007	Alex Timbers	Gutenberg! The Musical!
2008
2008	**Bartlett Sher**	**South Pacific**
2008	Christopher Ashley	Xanadu
2008	Sam Buntrock	Sunday in the Park with George
2008	David Cromer	Adding Machine
2008	John Doyle	A Catered Affair
2008	Bob McGrath	The Slug Bearers of Kayrol Island
2009
2009	**Stephen Daldry**	**Billy Elliot the Musical**
2009	Walter Bobbie	Irving Berlin's White Christmas
2009	Joe Mantello	9 to 5
2009	Jason Moore	Shrek the Musical
2009	Diane Paulus	Hair
2009	Stuart Ross	Enter Laughing the Musical

=== 2010s ===
Year	Director	Production
2010
2010	**Michael Mayer**	**American Idiot**
2010	Warren Carlyle	Finian's Rainbow
2010	Marcia Milgrom Dodge	Ragtime
2010	Igor Goldin	Yank!
2010	Terry Johnson	La Cage aux Folles
2010	Susan Stroman	The Scottsboro Boys
2011
2011	**Casey Nicholaw and Trey Parker**	**The Book of Mormon**
2011	Rob Ashford	How to Succeed in Business Without Really Trying
2011	Joe Calarco	In Transit
2011	Jack Cummings III	Hello Again
2011	Jack Cummings III	See Rock City & Other Destinations
2011	Kathleen Marshall	Anything Goes
2012
2012	**John Tiffany**	**Once**
2012	Christopher Ashley	Leap of Faith
2012	Jack Cummings III	Queen of the Mist
2012	Doug Hughes	Death Takes a Holiday
2012	Kathleen Marshall	Nice Work If You Can Get It
2012	Eric Schaeffer	Follies
2013
2013	**Diane Paulus**	**Pippin**
2013	Andy Blankenbuehler	Bring It On: The Musical
2013	Rachel Chavkin	Natasha, Pierre and the Great Comet of 1812
2013	John Doyle	Passion
2013	Emma Rice	The Wild Bride
2013	Alex Timbers	Here Lies Love
2013	Matthew Warchus	Matilda the Musical
2014
2014	**Darko Tresnjak**	**A Gentleman's Guide to Love and Murder**
2014	Sam Gold	Fun Home
2014	Michael Mayer	Hedwig and the Angry Inch
2014	Bartlett Sher	The Bridges of Madison County
2014	Susan Stroman	Bullets Over Broadway The Musical
2014	Alex Timbers	Rocky the Musical
2015
2015	**Thomas Kail**	**Hamilton**
2015	Carolyn Cantor	Fly By Night
2015	Bill Condon	Side Show
2015	John Doyle	The Visit
2015	Casey Nicholaw	Something Rotten!
2015	Christopher Wheeldon	An American in Paris
2016
2016	**John Doyle**	**The Color Purple**
2016	**Bartlett Sher**	**Fiddler on the Roof**
2016	Michael Arden	Spring Awakening
2016	Rupert Goold	American Psycho
2016	Bryna Wasserman and Motl Didner	The Golden Bride
2017
2017	**Rachel Chavkin**	**Natasha, Pierre & The Great Comet of 1812**
2017	**David Cromer**	**The Band's Visit**
2017	Christopher Ashley	Come from Away
2017	Bill Buckhurst	Sweeney Todd: The Demon Barber of Fleet Street
2017	Jerry Zaks	Hello, Dolly!
2018
2018	**Tina Landau**	**SpongeBob SquarePants**
2018	Christian Barry	Old Stock: A Refugee Love Story
2018	Teddy Bergman	KPOP
2018	Jack O'Brien	Carousel
2018	Bartlett Sher	My Fair Lady
2019
2019	**Rachel Chavkin**	**Hadestown**
2019	Noah Brody	Merrily We Roll Along
2019	Scott Ellis	Tootsie
2019	Daniel Fish	Rodgers & Hammerstein's Oklahoma!
2019	Joel Grey	Fiddler on the Roof

=== 2020s ===
Year	Director	Production
2020
2020	**Stephen Brackett**	**A Strange Loop**
2020	Thomas Kail	The Wrong Man
2020	Kathleen Marshall	The Unsinkable Molly Brown
2020	Leigh Silverman	Soft Power
2020	Annie Tippe	Octet
2021	No awards: New York theatres shuttered, March 2020 to September 2021, due to the COVID-19 pandemic in New York City	
2022
2022	**Marianne Elliott**	**Company**
2022	John Doyle	Assassins
2022	Lucy Moss and Jamie Armitage	Six
2022	Bartlett Sher	Intimate Apparel
2022	Jessica Stone	Kimberly Akimbo
2023
2023	**Thomas Kail**	**Sweeney Todd: The Demon Barber of Fleet Street**
2023	Jeff Calhoun	Between the Lines
2023	John Doyle	A Man of No Importance
2023	Maria Friedman	Merrily We Roll Along
2023	Jack O'Brien	Shucked
2024	**Jessica Stone**	**Water for Elephants**
2024	David Cromer	Dead Outlaw
2024	Rebecca Frecknall	Cabaret at the Kit Kat Club
2024	Daisy Prince	The Connector
2024	Danya Taymor	The Outsiders
2025
2025	**Michael Arden**	**Maybe Happy Ending**
2025	Zhailon Levingston and Bill Rauch	Cats: "The Jellicle Ball"
2025	Jamie Lloyd	Sunset Blvd.
2025	Jerry Mitchell	Boop! The Musical
2025	Alex Timbers	Just in Time
2025	George C. Wolfe	Gypsy
2026	**Lear deBessonet**	**Ragtime**
2026	Gordon Greenberg	The Baker's Wife
2026	Danny Mefford	The 25th Annual Putnam County Spelling Bee
2026	David Mendizábal	Mexodus
2026	Josh Rhodes	Beau the Musical
2026	Leigh Silverman	The Seat of Our Pants

== Multiple wins ==
4 wins

- Harold Prince

3 wins

- Tommy Tune
- Michael Mayer

2 wins

- Rachel Chavkin
- John Doyle
- Thomas Kail
- James Lapine
- Wilford Leach
- Bartlett Sher

== Multiple nominations ==
8 nominations

- Harold Prince
- John Doyle

6 nominations

- Michael Mayer
- James Lapine
- Scott Ellis
- Bartlett Sher

5 nominations

- Jack O'Brien
- George C. Wolfe
- Kathleen Marshall
- Christopher Ashley
- Susan Stroman

4 nominations

- Tommy Tune
- Jerry Zaks
- Joe Mantello
- Jack Cummings III
- Thomas Kail
- Alex Timbers

3 nominations

- Michael Bennett
- Andre Ernotte
- Graciela Daniele
- Michael Blakemore
- Casey Nicholaw
- David Cromer
- Rachel Chavkin

2 nominations

- Gerald Freedman
- Scott Schwartz
- Walter Bobbie
- Trevor Nunn
- Wilford Leach
- Bob Fosse
- Mike Ockrent
- Des McAnuff
- Nicholas Hytner
- Susan H. Schulman
- Tina Landau
- Michael Greif
- Matthew Bourne
- Jeff Calhoun
- Jerry Mitchell
- Diane Paulus
- Michael Arden
- Jessica Stone

== See also ==
- Laurence Olivier Award for Best Director
- Tony Award for Best Direction of a Musical
