= Show Boat (1959 cast album) =

Cast recording by Various: features Shirley Bassey and Dora Bryan
- Released: 1959
- Recorded: 1959
- Genre: Vocal Studio Cast
- Label: His Master's Voice
- Producer: Norman Newell

Show Boat
- Australian CD re-issue

Show Boat (1959 studio cast album) is a studio recording of the 1927 musical Show Boat by Jerome Kern and Oscar Hammerstein II. The album was recorded in the summer of 1959 at the No.1 studio, Abbey Road, London, and issued by the 'His Master's Voice' label, a subsidiary of EMI, which was run at this time by Norman Newell. It features a cast that was formed for this recording only; this cast did not perform the show live in any theatre production.

The album features the debut recordings made by Shirley Bassey for EMI, here she performs two songs in the role of Julie LaVerne. Previously she had successfully recorded at Philips Records but in 1959 her partner and manager Kenneth Hume arranged a contract with EMI/Columbia. These are also her first recordings made and released in stereo. The album also features the actress Dora Bryan, who appeared in films from the mid-1950s. She was later frequently seen on British television, most recently in the BBC series Last of the Summer Wine.

== Impact ==
The critics were not fans. Gramophone called Bassey's renderings "marred". AllMusic gave the LP only 3/5 stars. Jeffrey Dunn at Cast Album Reviews gave it 1/5.

The album was originally issued in two formats, a long-playing album in mono and stereo and as a two EP set, which featured highlights from the recording. A CD release was issued in mono by the Australian EMI company AXIS in the mid-1990s; it was finally issued in stereo in 2005 on the EMI label Classics For Pleasure where it appeared on a collection of Jerome Kern compositions such as Music in the Air and Roberta titled Kern - Show Boat etc..

== Track listing ==
1. "Overture" orchestra - 6.08
2. "Make Believe" Marlys Watters and Don McKay - 4.48
3. "Ol' Man River" Inia Te Wiata - 4.45
4. "Can't Help Lovin' Dat Man" Shirley Bassey - 4.22
5. "Life Upon the Wicked Stage" Dora Bryan - 3.19
6. "You are Love" Marlys Watters and Don McKay - 4.48
7. "I Might Fall Back on You" Dora Bryan and Geoffrey Webb - 2.14
8. "Why Do I Love You" Marlys Watters and Don McKay - 2.53
9. "I Still Suits Me" Inia Te Wiata and Isabelle Lucas - 3.19 (written for the 1936 film version of Show Boat)
10. "Bill" Shirley Bassey - 3.29
11. "Finale" Dora Bryan, Marlys Watters and Don McKay - 4.05

Unlike the stage version of Show Boat as well as two of the three film versions, the final reprise of Ol' Man River is not used as the finale.

== Personnel ==
- Michael Collins and his Orchestra – Arranger, Conductor
- Rita Williams and The Williams Singers - Vocal choir
