= A Naughty Knight =

- Music: Chuck Strand
- Lyrics: Chuck Strand
- Book: William Martin
- Productions: 2001 Jewish Repertory Theatre at Duke Theatre (Off-Off-Broadway)

A Naughty Knight is a 2001 musical comedy play written by William Martin with music and lyrics by Chuck Strand. The play premiered at the Off-Off Broadway Duke Theatre in a production by the Jewish Repertory Theatre.

== Plot ==
A Naughty Knight is based loosely on Mark Twain's short story "A Medieval Romance." It tells the story of Constance, a young princess living with her father in exile on a desert island. The princess dresses up as a boy and seizes her chance for freedom. She returns to the zany kingdom ruled by her father's evil twin brother, King Berger. She soon falls for Jervis, and is romantically pursued by the king's daughter.

== Productions ==
A Naughty Knight opened in previews at the Duke Theater on May 20, 2001, with an official premiere on June 3, 2001. The production was directed by the play's author, William Martin. Steven Silverstein directed, with Rebecca Kupka in the role of Constance, Christopher J. Hanke as Jervis, and Mark Manley as Constance's father, the exiled prince. The production closed as scheduled on June 17, 2001. (Note: Unlike Broadway productions that schedule an open-ended run until ticket sales wane, Off-Broadway repertory companies often schedule shows for only a limited run, in keeping with the repertory nature of the company.)

== Reception ==
A Naughty Knight received mixed reviews. The New York Times said of its book "[its] wordplay amounts to little more than sophomoric double-entendre" but praised its music, saying "[its] music and lyrics by Chuck Strand have consistent charm." Matthew Murray, writing for Talkin' Broadway, noted that the book "tends to get off track during the second act, when it seems to have more story than it completely knows how to handle", while Strand's score includes songs that "drive a point much further than it needs to go... [and] have a tendency to stop the show dead, or repeat what has already been covered in dialogue."
