= Institute of the American Musical =

The Institute of the American Musical, founded in 1972 by its current president Miles Kreuger, is located in Los Angeles. Its collection includes "the greatest collection of artifacts from the Broadway musical", including scripts and other material associated with the matter. It is considered "one of the most important archives of Broadway history", and has been called "a national treasure" by the Library of Congress.

== Collection ==
The collection includes items like playbills of Broadway-plays since the 19th century, the memoirs of Busby Berkeley, Oscar Hammerstein's personal copy of the Show Boat script and the Ray Knight collection which has been called the "crown jewel" of the institute's collection. It includes "the only known footage of much of early Broadway, including Julie Andrews in Camelot, Gwen Verdon in Damn Yankees and Ethel Merman in the original cast of Gypsy."
