= Miles Kreuger =

- Born: Miles Kreuger; March 28, 1934 (age 92); New York City, U.S.
- Occupation: President: Institute of the American Musical

Miles Kreuger (born March 28, 1934) is the Grammy Award nominated president and founder of the Institute of the American Musical. He has been called "the foremost expert on the American musical" and his Institute of the American Musical has been referred to as "a national treasure" and "one of the nation's most important cultural resources."

== Life ==
Kreuger was born in New York City, the son of a mink coat manufacturer and fashion illustrator and designer. He saw his first show on Broadway, a musical biography of Gilbert and Sullivan called Knights of Song, when he was four years old. As a child, he became fascinated by film archives and explored those at the Museum of Modern Art and the Museum of the City of New York.

At 16, he attended Bard College where he studied theater and literature and dreamed of becoming a director. For his senior project, he directed a version of William Butler Yeats’ Deirdre. After graduation, he directed "one or two showcase projects off-Broadway" but was "too shy, too passive" according to composer Sheldon Harnick. “To protect himself he started to build a wall between himself and the directorial world.”

Kreuger was director of publicity for My Fair Lady co-writer Alan Jay Lerner. According to Kreuger, in 1956 Lerner cast him as Freddy Eynsford-Hill but Kreuger "couldn’t sing as well as he read for the part." The role went to John Michael King and the production ran for six years.

As a producer, Kreuger introduced the trail-blazing French mime Etienne Decroux to New York audiences. The Mime Theatre of Etienne Decroux opened at the Cricket Theatre in Dec. 1959 and ran for 39 performances.

He began his career as a critic in 1959 with a well-received essay on Cole Porter. Kreuger also worked on a WBAI radio program about the theater called “Opening Night” and for Columbia Records impresario Goddard Lieberson.

Kreuger produced albums, wrote liner notes, taught at universities and, in 1977, published Show Boat: The Story of a Classic American Musical, establishing him as an authority on the musical. He was Grammy nominated for supplying liner notes for Ethel Waters on Stage and Screen and Show Boat. In 1989, he recorded an audio commentary for James Whale's 1936 version of Show Boat, which The Criterion Collection included in its 2020 DVD and Blu-Ray re-releases of the film, and supplied commentary on the 1929 version.

Kreuger has continued to publish works about the American Musical and has appeared in numerous documentaries about the subject, including 2003's Broadway: The Golden Age, by The Legends Who Were There.

== Institute of the American Musical ==
After moving to Los Angeles where he taught briefly as USC and UCLA, Kreuger founded the Institute of the American Musical in 1972, a nonprofit organization based in a 17-room house in Los Angeles.

His collecting began while living with his mother and grandmother: "The doorbell rang, and it was Lincoln Storage bringing me box after box after box of recordings filled with Richard Rodgers' treasures. And that's when I had to take my first apartment."

Among the holdings are donations from composers Rodgers, Irving Berlin and Harold Arlen, acting teacher Bobby Lewis and MGM. The collection also holds the Ray Knight pirated films of classic American musicals on Broadway, "probably the only record of much that made American comedy great." In addition, the collection houses "200,000 photographs from movie musicals dating back to 1914, every Broadway cast album, sheet music and recordings dating back to the 19th century, wax cylinders of popular as well as show music, published and unpublished scripts, playbills, scores, sheet music and posters."

The institute has received Rockefeller, National Endowment for the Humanities, California Arts Council, and California State Library grants but continues to face financial crisis.

== Select Publications ==
- The Movie Musical from Vitaphone to 42nd Street, as reported in a great fan magazine. New York, Dover Publications 1975.
- Show Boat: The Story of a Classic American Musical. Oxford University Press 1977.
- Souvenir Programs of Twelve Classic Movies, 1927-1941. New York, Dover Publications 1977.
- The Warner Bros. Musical: (1933–1939). Stanford Theatre Foundation 1990.

== Testimonial ==
Buff is an insult, a frivolous term; Kreuger, 63, is scholar, curator, expert, tonsured monk of the order of St. Lerner and St. Loewe.

— Patt Morrison, in LA Times, September 07, 1997.
