= Loni Ackerman =

American actress (born 1949)

- Born: April 10, 1949 (age 77); New York City, U.S.
- Occupations: Actress, singer
- Years active: 1968–present
- Spouse: Steve Canyon Kennedy (m. 1983)
- Children: 2
- Parents: Cyma Rubin (mother); Martin Ackerman (father); Samuel Rubin (stepfather)

Loni Ackerman (born April 10, 1949) is an American musical theatre performer and cabaret singer.

== Career ==
Ackerman was born in New York City to Cyma Rubin, a theatre and film producer, and Martin Ackerman, an ophthalmologist. Her stepfather was Samuel Rubin.

She made her Broadway debut in George M! in 1968, then starred as a replacement in the off-Broadway production of Dames at Sea in 1970. Ackerman's other Broadway credits include the roles of Betty Brown in the 1971 revival of No, No, Nanette, Charmin in The Magic Show (1974), and Wanda in So Long, 174th Street (1976). In 1977, she was in the original cast of Starting Here, Starting Now.

She played the title role in the first U.S. national tour of Evita (1980–1983) and was later a replacement in the title role of the Broadway production (from April to May 1983). The following year she was in the off-Broadway show Diamonds. Her last Broadway credit was as a replacement for Grizabella in Cats in September 1991. She appeared in the off-Broadway production of The Petrified Prince in 1994. She then retired to raise her two sons.

In 2011, she returned to performing at Gateway Playhouse in Bellport, Long Island, starring as Norma Desmond in the musical Sunset Boulevard. In 2012, Ackerman debuted her cabaret show Next To Ab-normal in NYC. She later starred in two plays, My Mother, My Sister, and Me (2016) and To Life (2019).

== Personal life ==
Ackerman is married to sound designer Steve Canyon Kennedy. They have two sons, Jack and George.
