= Two for the Show (musical) =

Two for the Show is a musical revue with sketches and lyrics by Nancy Hamilton and music by Morgan Lewis. The production was conceived by John Murray Anderson.

== Production ==
The musical opened on Broadway at the Booth Theatre on February 8, 1940, and closed on May 25, 1940, after 124 performances. It was produced by Gertrude Macy and Stanley Gilkey. Scenic design and costumes were made by Raoul Pène Du Bois; vocal arrangements were by Harold Cooke, with orchestrations by Hans Spialek and Don Walker. Directed by John Murray Anderson, the sketches were directed by Joshua Logan with musical staging by Robert Alton.

The original cast included William Archibald, Eve Arden, Virginia Bolen, Frances Comstock, Norton Dean, Alfred Drake, Brenda Forbes, Nadine Gae, Willard Gary, Richard Haydn, Eunice Healy, Betty Hutton, Kathryn Kimber, Dean Norton, Richard Smart, Robert Smith, Tommy Wonder, and Keenan Wynn.

The sketches "The Age of Innocence" and "Cookery" were written by Richard Haydn. The most notable song introduced in the show was "How High the Moon," which subsequently has been recorded by many pop and jazz artists, becoming a well-known standard.

There were two other revues in this series, all conceived and directed by John Murray Anderson: One for the Money (February 4, 1939 – May 27, 1939), and Three to Make Ready (March 7, 1946 – December 14, 1946).

== Songs ==
Act 1

- Calypso Joe
- This 'Merry' Christmas
- That Terrible Tune
- Destry Has Ridden Again
- How High The Moon - Alfred Drake, Virginia Bolen, Norton Dean, Eunice Healy, Kathryn Kimber, Richard Smart, Robert Smith, Tommy Wonder
- That Terrible Tune
- That Terrible Tune
- A House With a Little Red Barn
- The All-Girl Band

Act 2

- Where Do You Get Your Greens?
- At Last It's Love
- Song of Spain
- Fool for Luck
- Goodnight, Mrs. Astor

== Critical response ==
In his review for The New York Times, Brooks Atkinson called the successor to last year's revue a "very pleasant evening...little in size and breezily acted." He felt that Nancy Hamilton's sketches were more clever than entertaining, but were more professional than in the previous revue. He praised Richard Haydn's "limp mannerisms and gasping speech." Especially noted was "fresh and antic" Betty Hutton, "who dances like a mad sprite and sings breathlessly as though she enjoys it."
