= Ralph G. Allen =

Ralph Gilmore Allen (January 7, 1934 – September 9, 2004) was an American producer, director, writer, lyricist, and professor. He is credited, along with Harry Rigby with having conceived of the Tony Award-winning musical comedy Sugar Babies, a tribute to the burlesque era. In 1965, Allen was awarded the Guggenheim Fellowship in the category of Humanities.

== Biography ==
Ralph Gilmore Allen was born on January 7, 1934, in Philadelphia. As a teenager, he and his friends went to see burlesque shows. For his friends, the appeal of the burlesque show was the scantily-clad women, but Allen was more interested in the bawdy humor. Allen received his bachelor's degree from Amherst College in 1955 and his Doctor of Fine Arts from the Yale School of Drama in 1960. It was at Yale that Allen met his wife, Harriet Nichols. Allen died at the age of 70 in New York City on September 9, 2004.

== Career ==
In 1965, Allen was awarded a Guggenheim Fellowship for Theatre Arts. From 1965 through 1968, Allen served as an editor for the academic journal Theatre Survey. Allen served as artistic director at the Victoria Fair Theatre from 1968 to 1972. From 1972 through 1978, Allen was the chairman of the theatre department at the University of Tennessee, Knoxville. While at the University of Tennessee, he also served as the artistic director of the Clarence Brown company, a professional theatre company in residence at the university.

== Works ==
Allen is best known for having conceived, along with Harry Rigby, the musical comedy Sugar Babies. Allen had traveled around the United States interviewing elderly comedians and taking down their comedy sketches. He wrote a revue, which would later become Sugar Babies, based on his collection of approximately 5000 comedy sketches. The show opened on October 8, 1979, and ran for 1208 performances before closing on August 28, 1982.

Allen's other plays include a rendition of Rip van Winkle, co-authored by Joshua Logan in 1976, The Tax Collector in 1977, and Honky Tonk Nights, a 1986 collaboration with David Campbell. Allen also wrote several books including Theatre and Drama in the Making in 1964 and Gaiety: the life and times of the American Burlesque show in 1980.
