= Morgan Lewis (songwriter) =

William Morgan "Buddy" Lewis, Jr. (26 December 1906 – 8 December 1968) was a writer of jazz songs, some of which were also recorded in the pop music genre.

Lewis was born in Rockville, Connecticut and died in New York City. He wrote songs and Broadway theatre scores with lyricist Nancy Hamilton including "How High the Moon" and "The Old Soft Shoe".

== Selected work ==
Songs

- "At Last It's Love"
- "Cause You Won't Play House"
- "Fool for Luck"
- "A House with a Little Red Barn"
- "How High the Moon"
- "I Only Know"
- "If It's Love"
- "A Lovely, Lazy Kind of Day"
- "Oh, You're a Wonderful Person"
- "The Old Soft Shoe"
- "Teeter Totter Tessie"
- "Two Can Dream the Same Dream"
- "The Yoo Hoo Blues"
- "You Might As Well Pretend"

Broadway theatre scores

- New Faces of 1934 (1934); music also by others
- One For the Money (1939)
- Two for the Show (1940)
- Three to Make Ready (1946)

Film scores

- The Unconquered (Helen Keller in Her Story), Documentary (1954)
