= Cyma Rubin =

American producer and director (born 1926)

- Born: Cyma Saltzman; May 23, 1926 (age 99); Brooklyn, New York, U.S.
- Education: North Carolina State College of Agriculture and Engineering; The New York School of Interior Design
- Occupations: Producer; writer; director
- Known for: No, No, Nanette (1971); Greaser's Palace (1972)
- Notable work: Producer and co-editor of; Moment of Impact: Stories of the Pulitzer Prize Photographs; (Book)
- Television: A Few Days in Weasel Creek (television movie); Welcome Home, Bobby (television movie); Moment of Impact: Stories of the Pulitzer Prize Photographs; (Documentary)
- Spouses: 1st Husband: Martin Ackerman; 2nd Husband: Samuel Rubin
- Family: Daughter: Loni Ackerman

Cyme Rubin (born Cyma Saltzman, May 23, 1926) is an American producer, writer, and director. She is also the president of Business of Entertainment, Inc., a corporation she had created in 1991. She is a graduate of North Carolina State College of Agriculture and Engineering and The New York School of Interior Design. Her daughter is actress Loni Ackerman.

== Early life and career ==
Rubin was born Cyma Saltzman in Brooklyn, New York, on May 23, 1926, and grew up in North Carolina. In 1949, she graduated with a degree in textile management from North Carolina State College of Agriculture and Engineering (later North Carolina State University) and became an industrial designer. She later became a color consultant for architect Ludwig Mies van der Rohe. She married her first husband, ophthalmologist Martin Ackerman, in 1948. They had a daughter together, Lori, and later divorced.. Rubin founded the interior and industrial design company Cyma Ackerman, Inc. in 1957. In 1961, she married Samuel Rubin, the founder of Faberge Cosmetics. After her marriage to Rubin, she started a career in the entertainment industry. This marriage also ended in divorce.

== Career ==
=== Production career ===
In 1969, Rubin and writer/producer Harry Rigby created Rubin and Rigby Productions, Ltd.. Together, they prepared the production for the Broadway musical revival No, No, Nanette. However, Harry Rigby was struggling to find investors and was removed from the credits as co-producer. Rigby brought the issue to legal arbitration and received a financial settlement from Rubin. The corporation was later amended on December 30, 1970 to become Pyxidium, Ltd., a theatrical production company owned by Rubin. In 1971, Pyxidium produced No, No, Nanette on Broadway. The show also did a North America tour ending in 1974. In 1973, the show was mounted in London's West End at the Theatre Royal, Drury Lane by her production company. In 1977, the U.S. copyright was registered for the show's poster with Rubin as the author. The poster's lettering with women dancing & swimming around the borders was illustrated by Hilary Knight.

Following the success of the revival, she then produced the film Greaser's Palace (1972), which was written and directed by Robert Downey Sr. The film was not a commercial success. In 1975, she returned to Broadway to produce the musical Doctor Jazz which was choreographed by Donald McKayle. The show's scenic and costume designer, Raoul Pene du Bois, had been the production designer for No, No, Nanette.

In 1978, she produced a revival of the musical Oh, Kay! first in tryouts in Toronto, Canada, and then as a premiere at the Kennedy Center Opera House in Washington, D.C. However, the show did not have a successful run.

Rubin was the executive producer and Robert L. Jacks was the producer for the 1981 television movie A Few Days in Weasel Creek. In 1986, Rubin, Thomas De Wolfe, Robert Berger, and Herbert Brodkin were the production team of the television movie Welcome Home, Bobby.

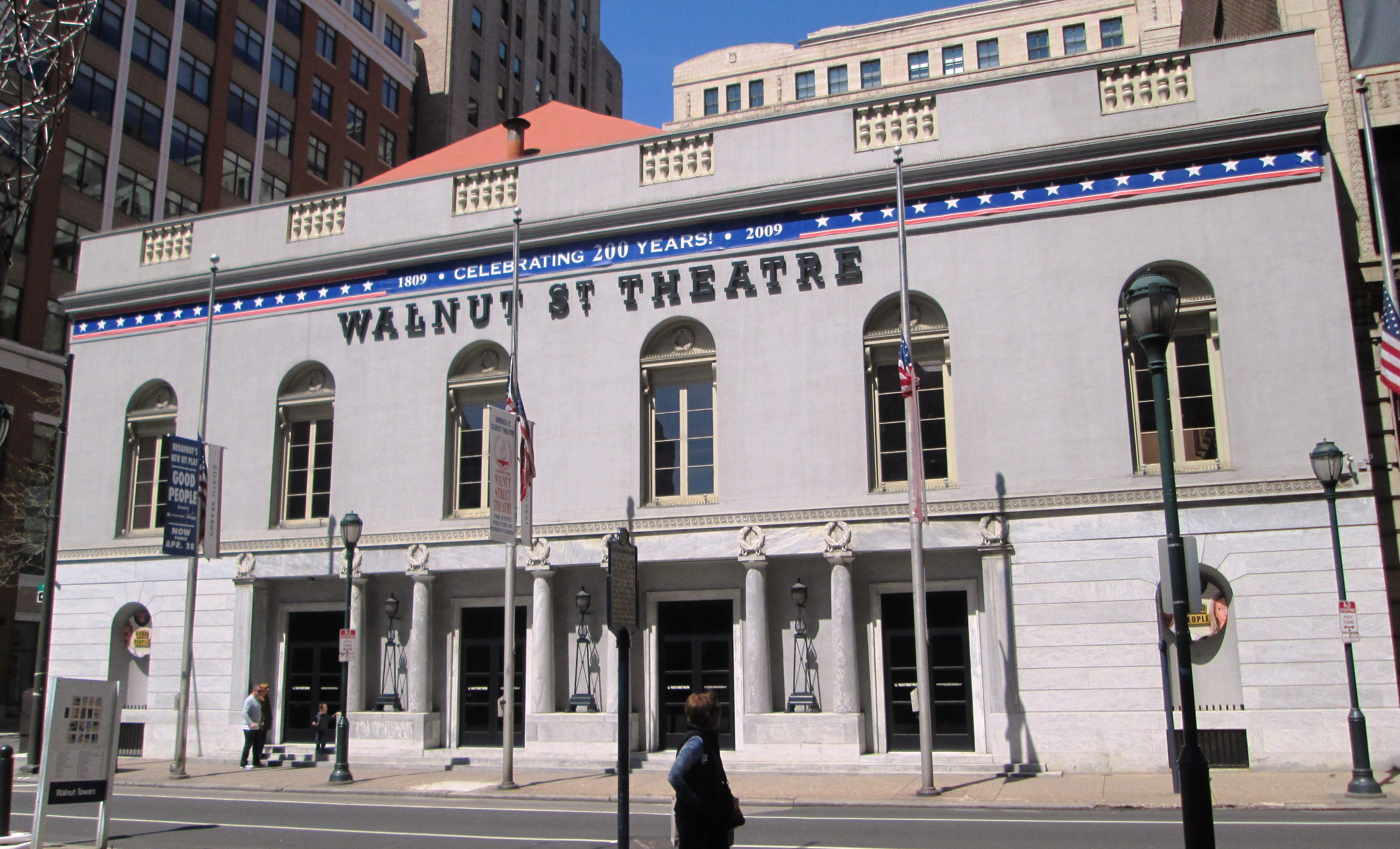
Walnut Street Theatre, Philadelphia Rubin produced Mike, the story of Mike Todd, Jr. in 1988 at this theatre.

In 1988, she returned to theater with the premier of Mike, the story of film producer Mike Todd Jr. at the Walnut Street Theater in Philadelphia, Pennsylvania.

In the 1990s, Pyxidium was dissolved by proclamation and Entertainment of Business, Inc. was created. Rubin produced her directorial debut in 1999 for the television documentary movie Moment of Impact: Stories of the Pulitzer Prize Photographs. She also curated the traveling exhibition of the photographic works, as well as edited, wrote, and produced the catalogue for the exhibition.

== U.S. copyrights ==
=== No, No, Nanette Poster ===
- Author: Cyma Rubin
- Lettering with women dancing & swimming around borders: Hilary Knight (Illustrator)
- Claimant: Broadway Properties, Ltd., Registration Date: 1977

=== Greaser's Palace (motion picture) ===
- Produced by Cyma Rubin, Written and directed Robert Downey, Sr.
- Claimant: Greaser's Palace incorporated (employer for hire), Registration Date: 1980

=== Capture the Moment: the Pulitzer Prize photographs (book) ===
- Edited by Cyma Rubin & journalist Eric Newton/ Written by Eric Newton
- Claimant: Freedom Forum Newseum (employer for hire), Registration Date: 2002

=== A Valuable Property (book) ===
- By Michael Todd Jr. & Susan McCarthy Todd
- Party 1: Cyma Rubin Party 2: Michael Todd Jr., Registration Date: 1984

=== Welcome Home, Bobby (television movie) ===
- Named on the copyright: Rubin, the production company, the director, & the fellow co-producers.
- Claimant: Titus Productions, Registration Date: 1987
