= Sula Benet =

Polish anthropologist and cannabis enthusiast

Sara Benetowa (Warsaw, 23 September 1903 – New York City, 12 November 1982), later known as Sula Benet, was a Polish anthropologist of the 20th century who studied Polish and Judaic customs and traditions.

== Biography ==
Born in Warsaw, then part of the Russian Empire, Benet was fascinated with Polish peasant culture from her early youth. This interest eventually led her to enroll as a student of literature and philosophy in the Faculty of Humanities in the University of Warsaw, graduating with a degree in anthropology in 1935. She then attended graduate school at Columbia University, where she received her doctorate in 1944. Also at this time (1936) she first made known at a seminar in Warsaw her theory that "calamus" in the Bible is hemp. Benet died in New York in 1982.

== Cannabis research ==
=== The term "kaneh" ===
Sulah Benet's claim that the biblical "kaneh" was hemp has found little support in the academic community among lexicographers and botanists. The standard reference lexicons of Biblical Hebrew, and reference works on Hebrew Bible plants by scholars such as University of Jerusalem botanist Michael Zohary mention Benet's suggestion, while others argue the word refers to an either different species of hemp or a different plant entirely. Royle identified the "sweet cane" (A.V.) of Scripture (Is. 43:24; Je. 6:20) with the Andropogon calamus, a plant extensively cultivated in India, from which an oil, deemed to be the famous spikenard of antiquity, is extracted. According to Boissier (Flora Orientalis), "kaneh" was the common marsh reed, Arundo donax L. Some biblical scholars and botanists believe that the qaneh is probably sugarcane. The Tel Arad temple finding of Cannabis reported by CNN on May 28th 2020 confirms its presence and use in the region, but for which rituals and practices (prescribed or otherwise) has not been discerned.

=== Folk uses of hemp in Eastern Europe ===
More than the kaneh debate, Benet is known for her detailed ethnographic accounts of practices of Polish and Eastern Europe peasants in using hemp for a variety of purposes, from food to psychoactivity. She also documented rituals and collective uses of the plant, and early uses of psychoactive hemp.

She declared in conclusion of her chapter "Early Diffusion and Folk Uses of Hemp" (p. 48):

I believe that the acceptance of tobacco in Europe was undoubtedly enhanced by European familiarity with smoking hemp. Tobacco was, in many ways a counterpart to hemp, all the familiar features were there. Brought to Spain from the New World as a medicinal plant, it came to be regarded as a cure-all; the Amerindian ritual use of tobacco may also have been known, and eventually also its psychoactive qualities. Even the use of pipes for smoking tobacco in the Near East was adopted from the water-pipes used for smoking hemp. Like hemp, tobacco is chewed, sniffed and smoked. Perhaps the spread of tobacco was so rapid and overwhelming in the Old World, because a receptive ground had been laid by the traditional folk uses of hemp.

== Selected works ==
- Konopie w wierzeniach i zwyczajach ludowych (1936)
- Song, Dance, and Customs of Peasant Poland (1951)
- Festive recipes and festival menus (1957)
- Riddles of many lands Carl Withers, Sula Benet (1956)
- "Early Diffusion and Folk Uses of Hemp" (1967) in Vera Rubin, Cannabis & Culture.
- Abkhasians: the long-living people of the Caucasus (1974)
- How to live to be 100: the life-style of the people of the Caucasus (1976)
