= Stanley Gilkey =

American producer and actor on Broadway

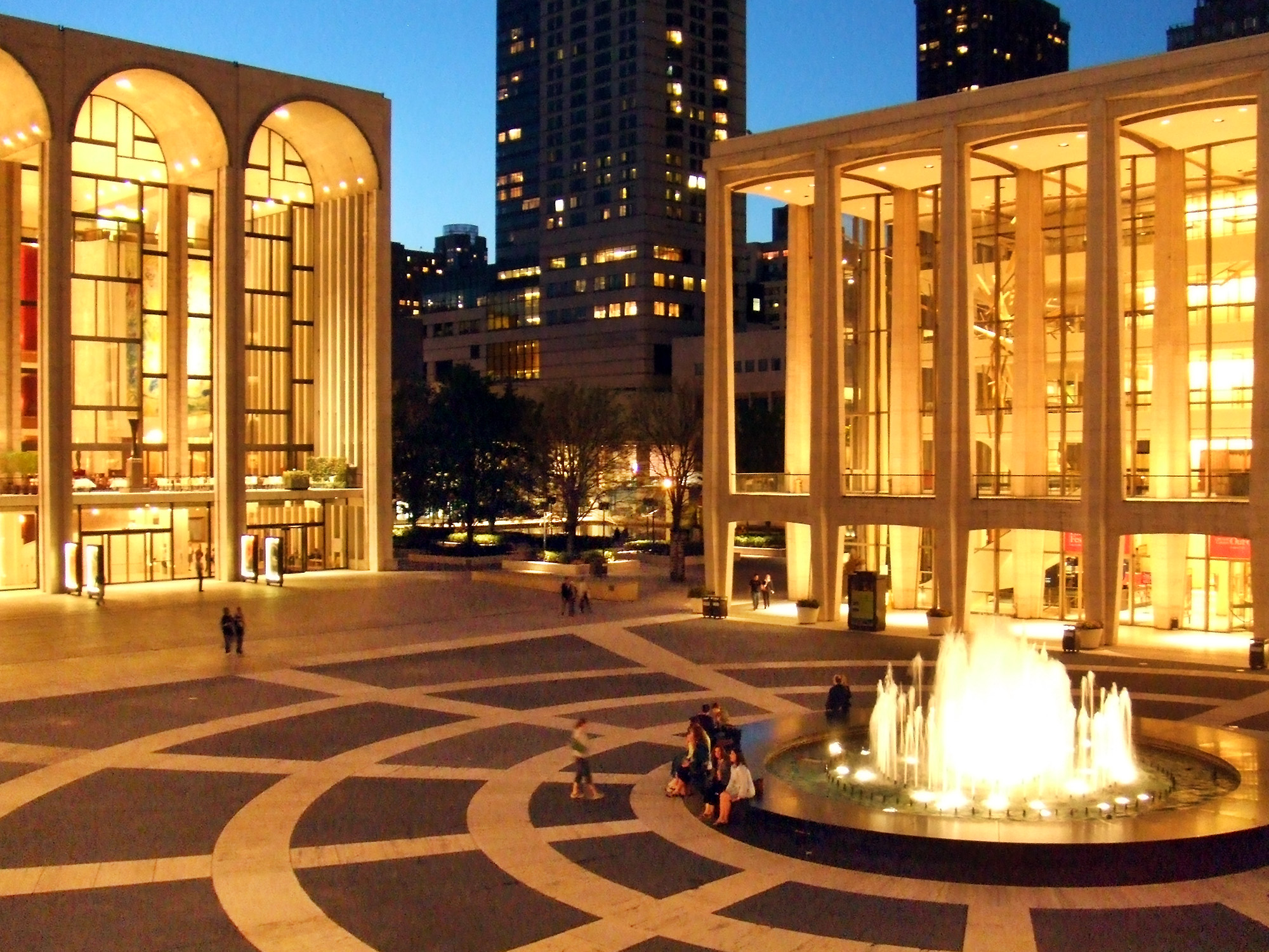
Lincoln Center. Stanley Gilky was the production manager for the Repertory Theater of Lincoln Center.

Stanley Gilkey (1900-1979), also known as Stanley Gilky, was a production manager, producer, and actor on Broadway.

He attended Harvard University and graduated from the university in 1923. He was executive producer for Guthrie McClintic for 35 years, and later a general manager for theatrical producer Robert Whitehead. Robert Whitehead and Elia Kazan were the producers of the Repertory Theater of Lincoln Center, and Gilkey was the general manager for their productions for the first two seasons as well as the theater board's acting administrator.

In 1947, he was the producer of Message for Margaret (1947), which only lasted five performances over the course of three days. He later was a co-producer with Michael P. Grace ll and Harry Rigby for John Murray Anderson's Almanac (1953). Gilky had produced five Broadway show prior to The Almanac. However, Grace and Rigby both had only one production as producers prior to the co-production. Grace, like Gilky, had also produced a Broadway show that closed after a few days, The King of Friday's Men (1951). There was clearly a certain level of risk for the co-production, but The Almanac show was a success and went on to complete 229 performances.

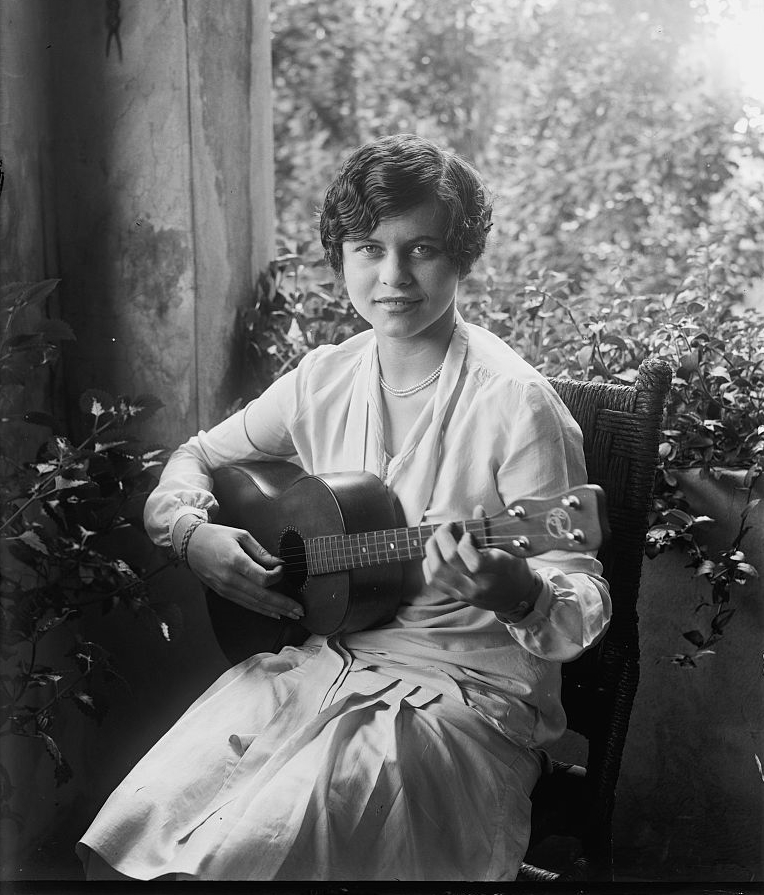
Nancy Hamiltion (1926)

== Shows produced with lyrics and sketches by Nancy Hamilton ==
- One for the Money (1939)
- Two for the Show (1940)
- Three to Make Ready (1946)

== In popular culture ==
In contemporary culture, he was portrayed in the play Veritas, a play which is based on Harvard's Secret Court of 1920. The story presents Gilkey at the time when he was a student at 1920 Harvard and was accused of being a homosexual by university administrators. Gilkey had been expelled from the university despite the fact that there was no evidence to the accusation. Based on his later request to the university, he was later readmitted in 1921 and graduated from Harvard in 1923. The Secret Court of 1920 went unreported until 2002, eighty two years after the event.

Gilky's Broadway credits
Title	Year	Role
The Age of Innocence	1928	Actor (Harry Delancey)
Winterset	1935	General Manager
Saint Joan	March, 1936	Company Manager
Hamlet	October, 1936	General Manager
Hight Tor	January, 1937	General Manager
The Star-Wagon	September, 1937	General Manager
Missouri Legend	1938	General Manager
One for the Money	February, 1939	Producer
Christmas Eve	December, 1939	General Manager
Two for the Show	1940	Producer
The Deep Mrs. Sykes	March, 1945	Producer
You Touched Me	December, 1945	General Manager
Three to Make Ready	1946	Producer
Message to Margaret	1947	Producer
John Murray Anderson's Almanac	1953	Producer
A Roomful of Roses	1955	Producer
The Day the Money Stopped	1960	Producer
Martha Graham and Her Dance Company	1960	Producer
Foxy	1964	(Producer for the original production in the Yukon Territory of Canada)
The Country Wife	1965	General Manager
The Condemned of Altona	1966	General Manager
