= Secret Court of 1920 =

Disciplinary tribunal at Harvard University

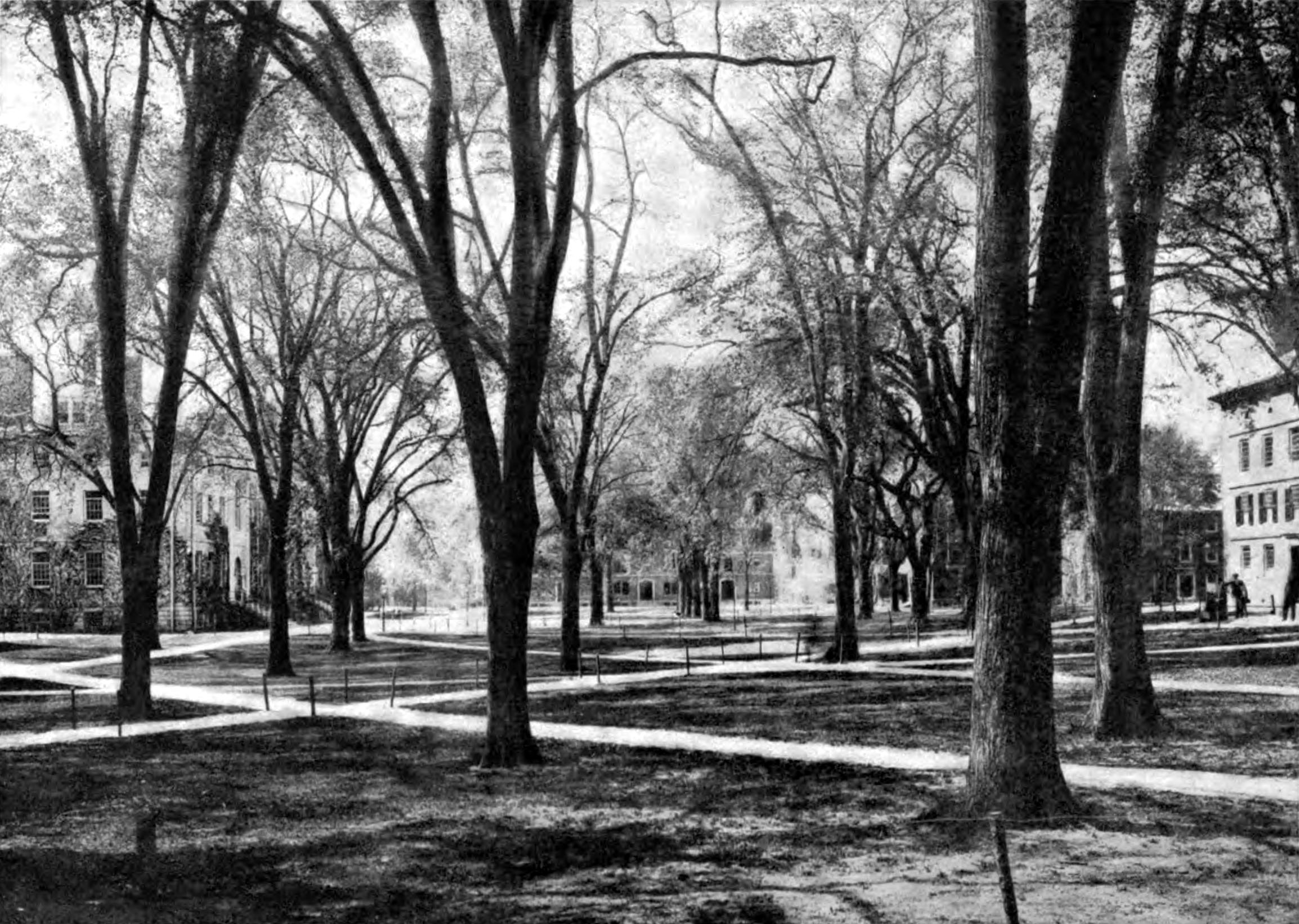
Harvard University in 1920

The Secret Court of 1920 was an ad hoc Harvard University disciplinary tribunal of five administrators, led by acting dean Chester Noyes Greenough, formed to investigate charges of homosexual activity among the student population. For two weeks in May and June 1920, the Court conducted more than 30 interviews behind closed doors and took action against eight students, one recent graduate working as a tutor, and one Ph.D. student also serving as an assistant professor for homosexual acts or association with known homosexuals. All ten were expelled or had their association with the university severed; two were later readmitted and went on to have successful careers.

The affair went unreported until 2003, when it was revealed through research in the university archives by The Harvard Crimson.

== Suicide of Cyril Wilcox ==
On May 13, 1920, Harvard College student Cyril Wilcox committed suicide by inhaling gas in his parents' house in Fall River, Massachusetts. Wilcox was on leave from the university for health reasons and had been previously warned about poor academic performance. On the night before his suicide, Wilcox confessed to his older brother, George Lester Wilcox, that he had a sexual relationship with Harry Dreyfus, an older Boston man whose parents owned the Hotel Dreyfus.

Shortly after Cyril's death, George Wilcox intercepted letters to Cyril from Harvard student Ernest Roberts and recent graduate and tutor Harold Saxton. These letters contained candid and detailed gossip which convinced George that Harvard was harboring a network of homosexual students. On May 22, George Wilcox located Dreyfus and beat him, extracting the names of three other men involved. Later that day, he met with acting Harvard dean Chester Noyes Greenough and shared the information he had learned from his brother, the letters, and Dreyfus.

== Harvard response ==
=== Formation of the Court ===
Immediately after meeting with George Wilcox, Greenough consulted Harvard president A. Lawrence Lowell. The two men decided to bypass the standard, relatively slow student disciplinary process. Instead, on May 23, just one day after George Wilcox's visit, Greenough formed a special five-member tribunal which referred to itself as "the Court" to distinguish it from the Administrative Board which handled standard student discipline. This nonspecific name disguised the subject of its investigations, and its files were later stored under the name "Secret Court" in the university archives.

The Court consisted of Greenough as its head along with Roger I. Lee, Matthew Luce, Edward R. Gay, and Kenneth Murdock. Lee was a professor of hygiene and doctor considered an expert in sexual health and responsible for annual physical examinations, which gave him experience posing intimate questions to students about their sexual activity. Luce, who was a regent of the university, was responsible for student discipline and conduct, especially housing and dormitory proctors. Gay and Murdock were young assistant deans, both slightly older than the undergraduates. The court reported to Lowell, and his rulings were final.

At the inception of the Court, Greenough identified Ernest Roberts, the son of former U.S. representative Ernest W. Roberts, as the principal target of its inquiry. On the same day as the Court was formed, Greenough spoke to Windsor Hosmer, a graduate business student and proctor of Perkins Hall, where Roberts was a resident. Hosmer told Greenough that he knew Roberts hosted parties in Perkins but caused no disturbances and broke no rules. Greenough assigned Hosmer to monitor visits to Roberts' room for three days and report both current and past visitors. On May 26, Hosmer listed Harvard College students Kenneth Day, Keith Smerage, and Nathaniel Wolff and dentistry student Eugene Cummings as visitors. Day and Smerage were noted as frequent visitors. Two other visitors objected to inclusion of their names, and Hosmer informed Greenough that he was "inclined to think that neither is part of the group that has centered around Perkins." A few days later, Hosmer returned to report that the last two boys had objected to his inclusion of their names.

Nathaniel Wollf was a 25-year-old from Buffalo, New York, just days away from graduating, when he volunteered to Greenough that he had information about the suicide of Cyril Wilcox and was quickly swept up in the court's investigation. When interviewed he described several homosexual experiences but asserted he had made a clean break. The Court expelled him and refused his requests for re-admittance though it had initially offered hope that he might return. Wollf's application for admittance to McGill University was also denied because of Harvard's report of the reason for his expulsion. Wollf earned a medical degree at Bellevue Hospital Medical College in New York City. After studying psychiatry for three more years, he spent ten years pursuing painting and academic interests. He traveled widely and briefly converted to Islam. He opened a nightclub in Barcelona in 1935. During World War II, he returned to the United States and he served as a psychiatrist for returning soldiers. He then practiced medicine in Mexico. He never married and died in London in 1959.

=== First anonymous letter ===
On May 26, an unsigned, typed letter was sent to Greenough, confirming and enlarging the allegations made by George Wilcox. It likely reached Greenough just as the Court began interviewing students. Its author identified himself as a junior and described how Cyril Wilcox had fallen in with a set of classmates during his freshman year who "committed upon him and induced him to commit upon them 'Unnatural Acts'" and had killed himself when he determined he lacked the "strength of character" to stop participating in such activity. According to the writer, Roberts was "the leader of this group and directly responsible" for the suicide:

Roberts rooms at Perkins 28 where he and more of his type have, during the past year, conducted "parties" that beggar description and how in the World such parties "got by" the Proctor is quite beyond me. At these parties were sailors in uniform whom Roberts and friends of his type picked up in the streets of Boston and used for his dirty immoral purposes. At the parties were notorious young male degenerates such as Harold Hussey, and Ned Courtney and many others of the type and many of them dressed in womans [sic] clothes which they brought with them and appeared in public hallways and entrys [sic] of Perkins so dressed.

In addition to Hussey and Courtney, the writer also named Day, Cummings, and student Edward Say as regular participants, as well as Saxton, and pressed home his point by describing parties where "the most disgusting and disgraceful and revolting acts of degeneracy and depravity took place openly in plain view of all present." The letter closed with a rhetorical question: "Isn't it about time an end was put to this sort of thing in college?"

=== Investigation ===
On May 27, the Court began interrogations. Greenough summoned each witness with a brief, non-specific note requesting their appearance in his office, directing students to appear even if necessary to miss a final exam. No transcripts of the interrogations survived, and it is difficult to ascertain the tenor of the exchanges from the Court's notes. The Court pressed witnesses and challenged them with conflicting facts and the notes record admissions of guilt followed by attempts to recant, as well as denials followed by admissions. The Court noted that Saxton "when pushed ... practically confessed to one act, but later retracted," and Day "confessed to H.S. [homosexual] relations with Roberts, after denial at first."

Many of those interrogated were never accused and have not been identified, suggesting that the Court was prepared to receive testimony from those it deemed innocent in an effort to identify those more directly involved. Despite its apparent secrecy, this may mean that the Court was willing to divulge or indicate its purpose to a broader public. The interrogations were not restricted to those directly affiliated with Harvard. Harry Dreyfus was called for his relationship with Cyril Wilcox and ownership of Café Dreyfus, a bar within his parents' hotel which the Court had identified as a known meeting place for homosexual students. Ned Courtney was a waiter at the café whose name was recorded as the "main annoyance" for his frequent telephone calls to Perkins Hall. It is unclear whether either Courtney or Dreyfus responded voluntarily or under threat. Other non-Harvard names in the Court's records include Harold Hussey, which may be a pseudonym lifted from a 1916 short story; Pat Courtney; William Toomey and Win Adams.

No subject was too personal for the Court's inquiry, and the members of the Court posed questions to students about masturbation habits (including mutual masturbation), sexual acts with women and men, cross-dressing, and entertaining overnight guests. The Court also compiled information on the accused students' friends and associates, their reading habits (including Havelock Ellis), testimony regarding the parties they attended, their familiarity with homosexuality and associated slang (e.g., "faggoty parties" and "tricks"). The Court also developed a list of associated establishments, including Café Dreyfus, The Lighted Lamp, The Golden Rooster, and Green Shutters.

As the court proceeded, it had increasing amounts of information to use to question witnesses and challenge their statements. Some were called back for follow-up questioning. The Court's notes suggest record Kenneth Day as "admit[ting] he is probably a little tainted. Mind poisoned." Ernest Roberts claimed he and Day had been "led astray" by Wilcox, and that Day had participated "not of his own free will." Another student, Joseph Lumbard, described witnessing kissing at male-only parties where men cross-dressed and danced together. Asked why he did not leave such a party, he allowed that he "stayed because he was interested." Stanley Gilkey defended reading Havelock Ellis, saying, "I think a man should know everything."

Assistant philosophy professor and Ph.D. student Donald Clark "denied any connection with homosexualism, and he denied talking about it except to help some students to cure themselves," but he later admitted to several sexual transgressions, including propositioning a student for sex. As a signal that the allegations against Clark were more serious than those against the students, Lowell personally attended his questioning.

In a dramatic and confrontational conclusion, Keith Smerage claimed that he could add 50 names to the few he had already furnished but would not. He later claimed the Court had tricked him into confessing by lying about the evidence against him and that he had expected leniency in exchange for his honest confession.

=== Disposition of cases ===
==== Expulsions ====
The Court punished ten students found guilty of some sexual offense, expelling eight:

- Eugene Cummings
- Kenneth R. Day
- Stanley Gilkey
- Joseph Lumbard
- Ernest Roberts
- Edward Say
- Keith Smerage
- Nathaniel Wolff

After he faced the court's questioning, Cummings became ill and checked himself into the Harvard infirmary. On June 11, possibly before he was notified of his expulsion, he used his medical knowledge to commit suicide using drugs available there. His death provoked the only press coverage of the court's work.

Day, Gilkey, Lumbard, and Wolff were found not to have committed any overt homosexual acts and were invited to reapply to Harvard in one or two years. Although Lowell initially opposed all four reapplications, Greenough fought for and eventually secured readmission for both Gilkey and Lumbard. He expressed special frustration over the failure to readmit Day. Informing Day that he could not return to Harvard, Greenough could only offer his personal reflections and assurances. "Two points, however, I beg you to bear in mind," Greenough wrote. "First, the chief thing in this world is to do right and be of service, whether at Harvard or outside. I know that you will keep on trying wherever you are. Secondly, please remember that if there is ever anything I can personally do to help you, I shall be glad to know it and to do it."

The Court told those expelled to leave Cambridge promptly, and Greenough ordered a letter to be placed in the files of those punished to prevent the College's alumni office from "making any statement that would indicate confidence in these men." Each of the expelled students were told that Harvard would reply frankly to any requests for recommendations or explanations for their expulsion. Lumbard found himself blocked when he applied to Amherst College, the University of Virginia, and Brown University. Brown dean Otis Randall even replied to Harvard to praise the Court, writing, "I feel your action in the matter was wise and just and that you deserve the support of the colleges to which young Lumbard may make application. How frequently we uncover messes of this sort, and how disagreeable it is to deal with such matters." Wolff received similar treatment when applying to McGill University.

==== Letters to families and responses ====
Greenough wrote to the families of each student, advising that they speak to their sons, and urged each student to confess to their parents. To Roberts, whom he considered the most culpable, he wrote, "The letter that I am sending to your father this morning, although it does not tell him everything, necessitates your telling him everything." In that letter, Greenough wrote, "His offense has nothing to do with low scholarship; it is not gambling, or drink or ordinary sexual intercourse. If he does not confess to something worse than these things, he will not have told you the whole story." Letters to those who were not found to have committed an overt homosexual act explained the circumstances at length, criticizing only their judgement as "no worse than ignorant, over-curious, and careless" and providing the Court's rationale for expulsion: "The acts in question are so unspeakably gross that the intimates of those who commit these acts become tainted."

Reactions from the families were variously troubled, supportive, and forgiving, from pleading to polite challenges:

- Day was an orphan, and his cousin undertook a long correspondence with Greenough detailing his cousin's work habits and social contacts.
- Mr. Lumbard protested his son's "extremely unjust treatment."
- Mr. Gilkey asked for his son to be readmitted to erase a "penalty out of proportion to his delinquency."
- Mr. Roberts sought assurances from Greenough that his son had terminated his "evil practices."
- Mr. Say asked to see evidence against their son, and when Greenough replied that he could not send "the great mass of evidence," Mrs. Say wrote to express concern that others of greater means, like Lumbard, were not being treated as harshly. "My son's father is not a doctor," she wrote, "but he is a good, honest working father."
- Mrs. Smerage initiated a yearlong correspondence speaking of her "stricken home" and her son's history of illness, ultimately questioning the Court's entire approach as un-Christian: "I feel now that you men could have done much good had you perhaps had a little less sense of justice and a little more of the spirit of Jesus in your hearts."
- Mr. Wolff asked the dean to recognize that reform was more important than punishment. "I am taking the liberty of appealing to you, not in your official capacity, but as a man, to do what you can to assist him," he wrote. "You know all are subject to mistakes, and the blessing is in those who can aid and advise in correcting and saving rather than otherwise."

==== Other consequences ====
Saxton, the tutor, and Clark, the assistant professor and Ph.D. student, were also refused positive professional references; in response to one request for Saxton's credentials, it identified him as responsible for "moral turpitude." Saxton was Clark was required to finish grading papers before leaving the Ph.D. program. He was later expunged from university records.

The Court identified four others without connections to Harvard as "guilty" but lacked the power to punish them. For example, it noted that for Harry Dreyfus, "No action [was] possible." The Court did record that they would try to see that Ned Courtney would lose his job as a waiter.

=== Public awareness ===
Although the undergraduate student body was likely aware of the Court's work, given the number of interviews and the consequent expulsions, it generally escaped public attention. At least twice, the Court was informed that Ernest Roberts was threatening to publish his opposition to the Court and its methods, but nothing came of the threat. The Court itself, in communications with the families, gave assurances that "every effort has been made to prevent any knowledge of this affair from becoming public."

On June 19, the Boston American ran a news story connecting the deaths of Wilcox (still considered accidental) and Cummings as classmates, friends, and Fall River residents who had died within the same month. According to the American, Cummings had told friends about "an alleged inquisition, which he claimed was held in the college following Wilcox' death" in which he had been taken to a room "shrouded in gloom" and "questioned exhaustively." College authorities denied the story and said attributed it to Cummings's "disordered mind." Roger I. Lee put an end to further inquiries by telling the American that Cummings "had been acting in a queer manner." Contemporary press coverage ended with that one article.

=== Second anonymous letter and closure of investigation ===
As the Court concluded its initial work, it received a second anonymous letter upbraiding it for failing to identify "most, if not all" students guilty of homosexual activity, who now "continued their practices within the student body and continued spreading it." According to the writer, the Court had mishandled its investigation by concentrating on Roberts, whose network encompassed only half of the 50 guilty students. According to the author, the others had disliked the Roberts set and had "little cliques of their own." The letter also said that the Court's methods, such as the grilling Cummings described and consistent use of expulsion, were not well considered, arguing that offering more lenient treatment in return for additional names would have accomplished more. The identity of the letter's author remains unknown.

The court took no action in response to this critique. On June 22, less than four weeks after the Court began investigating, senior class exercises were held in Sanders Theatre. In July, Greenough responded to Grace Smerage's complaint that Harvard had just graduated others as guilty as her son, if not more so. Greenough replied, "We certainly cannot be held responsible for not acting on evidence we did not possess, especially when we have asked all the boys we have summoned if they had anything further to tell us. If boys choose to shield those who are guilty, they must accept the incomplete results of a Board acting upon information which is inadequate because the boys themselves have chosen to let it be inadequate."

== Aftermath ==
Windsor Arnold Hosmer, the Perkins Hall proctor, earned his master's in business administration from Harvard Business School in 1921 and taught briefly at Harvard Business School before moving to Hobart College. He returned to Harvard in 1931 and became a full professor in 1937. He became an expert in accounting and small business management and served as an adviser to the United States Atomic Energy Commission. He retired from teaching in 1963.

The two students who were eventually readmitted to Harvard had lengthy and successful careers. Stanley Gilkey was readmitted in 1921 and he graduated in 1923. He lived in Paris for two years before returning to the United States, where he produced ten Broadway shows over twenty years. He died in Pacifica, California, in 1979. Joseph Lumbard was readmitted in 1921 and graduated from Harvard Law School in 1925. Harvard later provided recommendations clearing Lumbard of involvement when he was hired by the Department of Justice in 1931 and appointed to the United States Court of Appeals for the Second Circuit in 1952. In the second case, Harvard's registrar reported that he gave the FBI "the facts in the case clearing L[umbard] of any question," saying that Lumbard had been expelled "solely because of association with [the homosexual] group spacially." Lumbard married in 1929 and died in 1999.

The other men expelled or implicated by the Court had less successful outcomes:

- Donald Clark was expelled from the Ph.D. program and not reappointed to his teaching position. Lowell later crossed Clark's name off all school records. Clark taught at Mills College and the David Mannes School of Music and published a book of poetry and translations from Italian and German. He worked as a librarian at the National Jewish Hospital in Denver until his death from tuberculosis at age 47 in 1943.
- Kenneth Day married in April 1926 and moved to New York, where he worked as a head bank teller. He had two daughters, was widowed late in life, and married twice more.
- Ernest Weeks Roberts married less than a year later, saw the birth of Ernest Jr. at the end of 1921, and enjoyed a successful career as an interior decorator.
- Harold Winfield Saxton had difficulty finding employment when Harvard refused to recommend him. After teaching at a variety of schools around the country, as well as in England, Saxton eventually returned home to Chelsea, Massachusetts, where he remained at his parents' home until at least 1942. Nothing further is known of his life.
- Edward Say returned to Connecticut and worked as a securities salesman. He was active in his church and never married. He was killed in a car crash on July 13, 1930.
- Keith Smerage became assistant manager of his mother's inn in Topsfield, Massachusetts. He had some jobs in regional theater productions, using "Richard Keith" as his stage name, once playing the lead in Tangerine. He was out of work when he killed himself by inhaling household gas in his Greenwich Village apartment on September 8, 1930.
- Nathaniel Wolff earned a medical degree at Bellevue Hospital Medical College in New York City. After studying psychiatry for three more years, he spent ten years pursuing painting and academic interests. He traveled widely and briefly converted to Islam. He opened a nightclub in Barcelona in 1935. During World War II, he returned to the United States and he served as a psychiatrist for returning soldiers. He then practiced medicine in Mexico. He never married and died in London in 1959.

Harry Dreyfus moved to Providence in the late 1920s, where he lived as a bachelor. On July 4, 1925, his parents' hotel collapsed, destroying the former Cafe Dreyfus and killing 44 people. He died in September 1978 in Miami.

== 2002 revelation and interpretations ==
In 2002, Amit Paley, a researcher from The Harvard Crimson, came across a box of files labeled "Secret Court" in the Harvard archives. After a protracted campaign by the paper's staff, the university released five hundred documents relating to the Court's work. An article by Paley in The Crimson's weekly magazine Fifteen Minutes reported the Court's proceedings on November 21, 2002. Though Harvard insisted on redacting the names of those investigated, six Crimson researchers were able to identify most through other records.

Harvard president Lawrence Summers responded to Paley's story in this way:

These reports of events long ago are extremely disturbing. They are part of a past that we have rightly left behind. I want to express our deep regret for the way this situation was handled, as well as the anguish the students and their families must have experienced eight decades ago. Whatever attitudes may have been prevalent then, persecuting individuals on the basis of sexual orientation is abhorrent and an affront to the values of our university. We are a better and more just community today because those attitudes have changed as much as they have.

An editorial in The Crimson two weeks later called on the university to grant "posthumous honorary degrees" to those expelled and not allowed to return. It also charged that by failing to reveal the names of the students involved, "the university implies that they were accused of some legitimate transgression." In a letter to the editor the next week, Gladden J. Pappin, a Harvard junior and editor of a conservative campus magazine, The Harvard Salient, objected to the editorial's proposed degrees and called the Court's work "a very appropriate disciplinary move." He also called for the administration to "reestablish standards of morality" and punish violators, noting that "such punishments would apply to heterosexuals, of course, but even more so to homosexuals, whose activities are not merely immoral but perverted and unnatural." In a similar vein, conservative commentator Pat Buchanan wrote, "Harvard appears to have quietly expelled a few deviates while avoiding a public scandal that would have ruined their reputations and damaged Harvard’s good name. What did Harvard do wrong? ... Harvard has not only turned its back on its Christian past, it has just renounced its Christian roots as poisoned and perverted." Two editors of the Salient resigned over the Pappin letter.

In 2010, a movement called "Their Day in the Yard" petitioned Harvard to grant posthumous honorary degrees to the expelled students. On February 28, 2012, the university issued a statement stating that it "does not award posthumous degrees except in the rare case of a student who completes all academic requirements for the degree but dies before the degree has been conferred." However, The Crimson reported that at least 28 posthumous degrees were granted to former students who did not complete their academic requirements before dying in World War I. In 2019, a student-led centennial effort advocated for posthumous degrees for the expelled students and other improvements for LGBTQ students at Harvard. It has since held several panels and events.

=== Dramatic adaptations ===
A book-length dramatization of the Court's proceedings was written by William Wright and published by St. Martin's Press in 2005. The book recounts the Court's records in detail, while also including imagined conversations and speculation. Where only the notes of an interrogation survive, Wright reconstructs the questions and at times characterizes the tone of voice of the questioners.

In 2008, Michael Van Devere wrote, produced, and directed a film based on the Court's work called Perkins 28: Testimony from the Secret Court Files of 1920. The film consists of reenactments of nine interrogation sessions and uses a cast of Harvard undergraduates. The screenplay is based on the Court's documents.

At least two stage works dramatizing the Court and the affected students have been presented in New York. In 2010, VERITAS by Stan Richardson was presented at the New York International Fringe Festival. In 2011, Classic Stage Company presented Unnatural Acts: Harvard's Secret Court of 1920.
