= Sugar Babies (musical) =

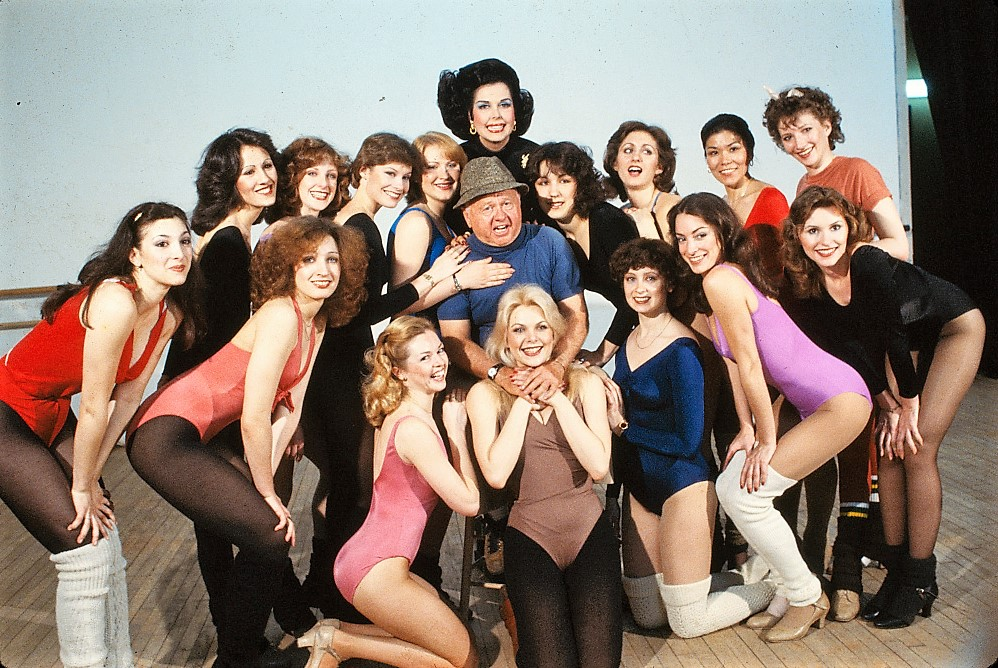
- Cast of first production of Sugar Babies, 1979 musical. Center, top to bottom, are Ann Miller, Mickey Rooney, Ann Jillian.
- Music: Jimmy McHugh
- Lyrics: Dorothy Fields; Al Dubin various
- Book: Ralph G. Allen; Harry Rigby
- Productions: 1979 Broadway; 1987 Australia; 1988 West End

Sugar Babies is a musical revue conceived by Ralph G. Allen and Harry Rigby, with music by Jimmy McHugh, and lyrics by Dorothy Fields, Al Dubin and various others. The show is a tribute to the old burlesque era. (The show's name is taken from one of many shows on the old Mutual Burlesque wheel of the Roaring Twenties.) First produced in 1979 on Broadway and running nearly three years, the revue attracted warm notices and was given subsequent touring productions.

== Productions ==
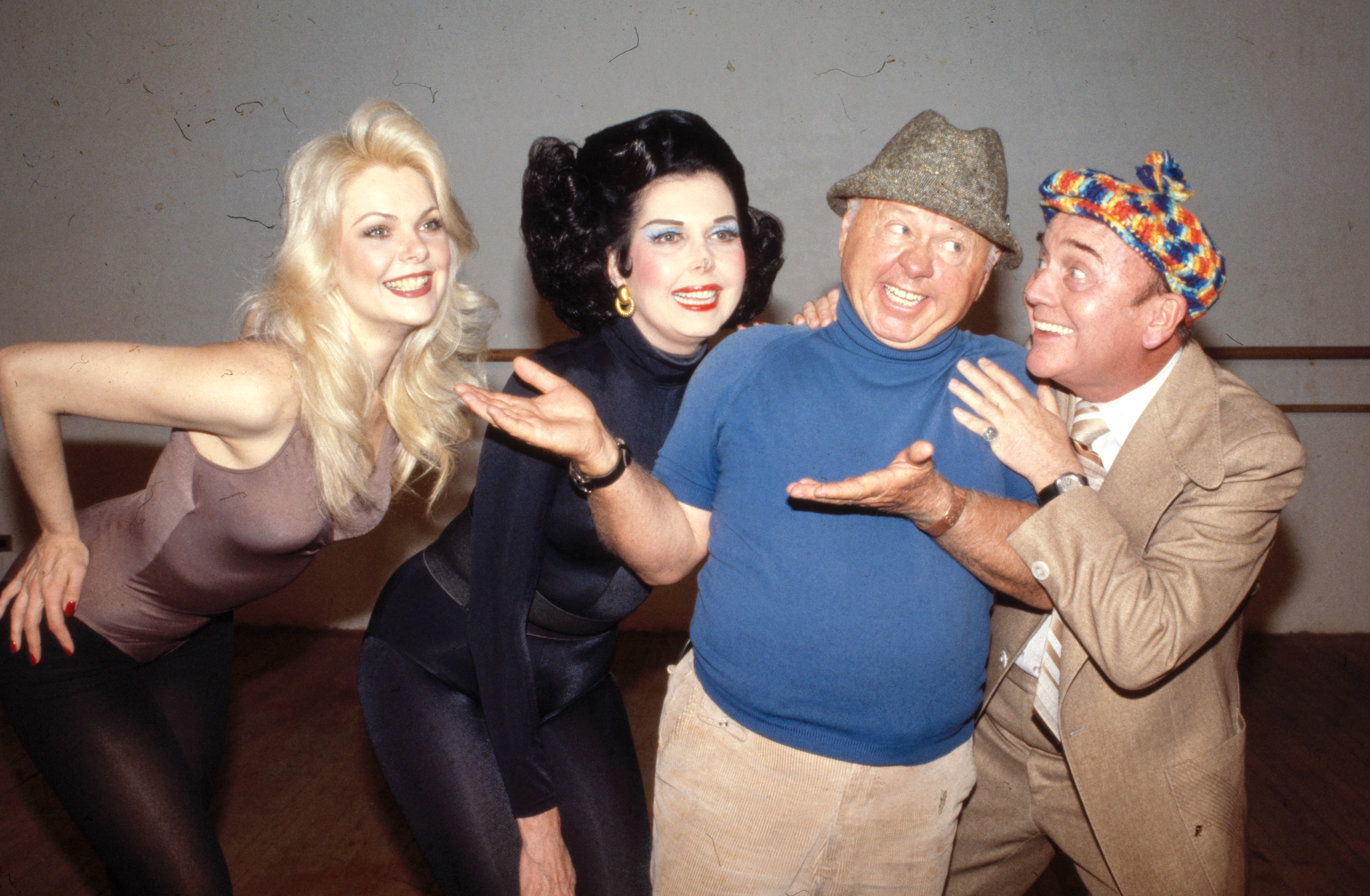
Left to right: Ann Jillian, Ann Miller, Mickey Rooney, Peter Leeds in the first production of Sugar Babies, 1979

Sugar Babies opened on Broadway at the Mark Hellinger Theatre on October 8, 1979 and closed on August 28, 1982 after 1,208 performances. Staging and choreography was by Ernest Flatt, with sketches directed by Rudy Tronto, musical direction by Glen Roven, scenic and costume design by Raoul Pene Du Bois, lighting design by Gilbert Vaughn Hemsley Jr., vocal arrangements and lyrics by Arthur Malvin, additional vocal arrangements by Hugh Martin, Ralph Blane, and orchestrations by Dick Hyman.

The revue starred Mickey Rooney in his Broadway debut, Ann Miller, and featured Ann Jillian, Peter Leeds and Jerry Orbach. After the original stars left, successors included Juliet Prowse, Anita Morris, Joey Bishop, Eddie Bracken, Jeff Dunham and Rip Taylor.

The revue subsequently had a short-lived National tour which starred Carol Channing and Robert Morse, from August through November 1980. The 1982 Bus and Truck Tour starred Eddie Bracken and Jaye P. Morgan (who was succeeded by Mimi Hines). The 2nd National Tour, in 1984 and 1985, reunited Rooney and Miller.

A revival of the show, "Sugar Babies 2", which would have starred Jerry Lewis, Chita Rivera and Rip Taylor, was planned for the fall of 1991, but ultimately did not happen.

== Concept ==
Norman Abbott, nephew of famed straight man Bud Abbott, inherited his uncle's "treasure trove of burlesque material, including written gags, props, music, and posters." Inspired, the younger Abbott and his wife had an idea:

Norman and his wife conceived of a modern Broadway musical combining all the elements of burlesque. He then came to the conclusion that the only person alive who could pull this off as a headliner was Mickey Rooney.
- Richard Lertzman and William J. Birnes, in "The Life and Times of Mickey Rooney"

After two weeks of rehearsals, however, Rooney clashed with Abbott, who was directing the show. Rooney, who insisted on taking a hand in staging the comedy scenes himself, told Abbott, "This isn't going to work out." Abbott was fired as director, and although he didn't have a contract, he sued producer Harry Rigby and received a six-figure settlement.

(Ralph G. Allen) visited theaters around the country, sitting with elderly comics and taking down their routines. He amassed a collection of some 5,000 comedy sketches. He considered writing a book, but Dr. Allen realized it would be much more fun to put on a show. He wrote a revue, based on the sketches, which was performed at the University of Tennessee. Some time later, Dr. Allen gave a talk in New York at a conference on early-20th-century popular entertainment. As part of his lecture, he read the script of his revue. Afterward, he was approached by a member of the audience, Mr. Rigby, a producer.

In 1977, at a "scholarly four‐day conference to study the History of American Popular Entertainment" at the New York Public Library for the Performing Arts, Ralph G. Allen, a theater professor and historian fascinated with burlesque, presented a lecture, from a prior College of Fellows of the American Theatre Address, with pieces of a revue he wrote, that borrowed material from long-forgotten burlesque routines, "At My Mother's Knee (and Other Low Joints)". Rigby was in the audience and approached Allen about the material, and together they wrote the book for the show. Sugar Babies debuted two years later.

The show consists of old burlesque blackout gags and sketches, interspersed with song and dance numbers, and vaudeville specialty acts. Typical of the risqué jokes was this one in the "Broken Arms Hotel" sketch:

DESK CLERK (on the telephone): Broken Arms Hotel... What's that? You say you got a leak in the bathtub?... Well, go ahead! You paid for the room!

The Sugar Babies score contains standards such as "Don't Blame Me" and "I Feel a Song Comin' On", and newly created musical numbers, including "The Sugar Baby Bounce".

The show had burlesque "tropes" such as the swing number, the sister act, the fan dance, the vaudeville dog act. "It was all fast and funny and it ended with a patriotic number...with the entire company in red, white, and blue with a flag background and Miller as the Statue of Liberty."

== Songs and scenes ==
Source: Script

Act 1

- Scene: A Memory of Burlesque

A Good Old Burlesque Show

- Scene: Welcome to the Gaity

Let Me Be Your Sugar Baby

- Scene: Meet Me Round the Corner
- Scene: Travelin'

In Louisiana
Goin' Back to New Orleans

- Scene: The Broken Arms Hotel
- Scene: Feathered Fantasy (Salute to Sally Rand)

Sally

- Scene: The Pitchmen
- Scene: Ellis Island Lament

Immigration Rose

- Scenes from Domestic Life
- Scene: Torch Song
- Scene: Orientale
- Scene: The Little Red Schoolhouse
- Scene: The New Candy-Coated Craze

The Sugar Baby Bounce

- Scene: Special Added Attraction

Down At the Gaiety Burlesque
Mr. Banjo Man

Act 2

- Scene: Candy Butcher
- Scene: Girls and Garters

I'm Keeping Myself Available For You
Exactly Like You

- Scene: Justice Will Out
- Scene: In A Greek Garden

Warm and Willing

- Scene: Presenting Madame Alla Gazaza
- Scene: Tropical Madness

Cuban Love Song

- Scene: Cautionary Tales
- McHugh Medley

Every Day Another Tune
I Can't Give You Anything but Love, Baby
I'm Shooting High
When You and I Were Young, Maggie Blues
On the Sunny Side of the Street

- Scene: Presenting Bob Williams
- Scene: Old Glory

You Can't Blame Your Death on Uncle Sammy

== Reception ==
Time wrote that the show is a "happy send-off to burlesque", and "Rarely has so much energy been packed into so small a package. Rooney dances, he sings, he mugs, he dresses in drag."

== Awards and nominations ==
=== Original Broadway production ===
Year	Award	Category	Nominee	Result
1980	Tony Award	Best Musical		Nominated
1980	Tony Award	Best Book of a Musical	Ralph G. Allen and Harry Rigby	Nominated
1980	Tony Award	Best Original Score	Arthur Malvin	Nominated
1980	Tony Award	Best Performance by a Leading Actor in a Musical	Mickey Rooney	Nominated
1980	Tony Award	Best Performance by a Leading Actress in a Musical	Ann Miller	Nominated
1980	Tony Award	Best Direction of a Musical	Ernest Flatt and Rudy Tronto	Nominated
1980	Tony Award	Best Choreography	Ernest Flatt	Nominated
1980	Tony Award	Best Costume Design	Raoul Pène Du Bois	Nominated
1980	Drama Desk Award	Outstanding Actor in a Musical	Mickey Rooney	Nominated
1980	Drama Desk Award	Outstanding Actress in a Musical	Ann Miller	Nominated
