= Elaine Joyce =

American actress

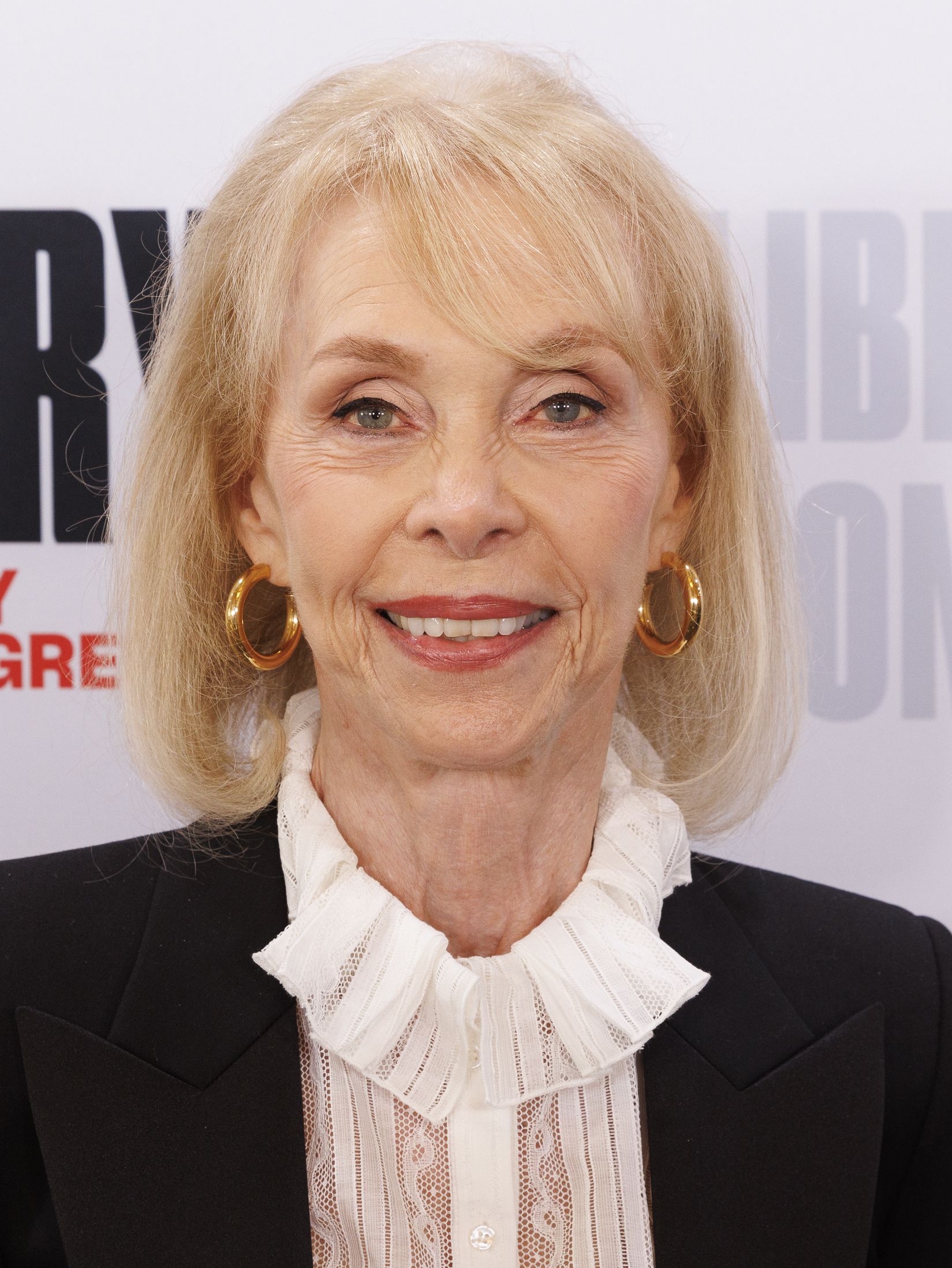
- Joyce in 2022
- Born: Elaine Joyce Pinchot; December 19, 1945 (age 80); Cleveland, Ohio, U.S.
- Occupation: Actress
- Years active: 1961–present
- Spouses: Bobby Van (m. 1968; died 1980) John Levoff (m. 1985; div. 1992) Neil Simon (m. 1999; died 2018)
- Children: 2

Elaine Joyce (born December 19, 1945) is an American actress.

== Early life and education ==
Elaine Joyce Pinchot was born on December 19, 1945 in Cleveland, Ohio, of Hungarian ancestry; she is the daughter of Iliclina (née Nagy) and Frank Pinchot.

== Career ==
She made her film debut in 1961 as an extra in West Side Story and made uncredited appearances in several musical films, including The Music Man, Bye Bye Birdie, and Funny Girl before being cast in Such Good Friends and How to Frame a Figg in 1971.

She made her television debut in an episode of Route 66 in 1962, was one of the dancers on The Danny Kaye Show, and had recurring roles in The Young and the Restless and Days of Our Lives. She made guest appearances in such series as The Andy Griffith Show; The Red Skelton Show; Love, American Style; The Carol Burnett Show; Kojak; Charlie's Angels; Hawaii Five-O; Quincy, M.E.; The Feather and Father Gang; The Love Boat; Alone at Last; and $weepstake$. She hosted the first season (1986–87) of The All New Dating Game and was a regular panelist on Match Game, Tattletales, Super Password and Password Plus, What's My Line?, and I've Got a Secret. In 1982, she hosted the television special Computers Are People Too, which explored the burgeoning world of computer graphics and technology.

In 1971, Joyce starred in the final episode of Green Acres as Oliver's former secretary, Carol Rush. The episode was a backdoor pilot, titled "The Blonde" or "Carol," which featured Joyce as a young, dizzy blonde who lives with her sister and brother-in-law in Los Angeles, and manages to save her no-nonsense boss, played by Richard Deacon, from a real estate scam. The pilot was not picked up.

In her 1972 Broadway debut Joyce had the title role in Sugar, a musical adaptation of the 1959 film Some Like It Hot, portraying band singer Sugar Kane, the role originated by Marilyn Monroe on screen. Joyce won the 1972 Theatre World Award for her performance.

In the 1976 television series City of Angels, she played Marsha Finch, the ditzy secretary to Los Angeles private eye Jake Axminster (Wayne Rogers), who ran a call girl service on the side. She appeared with her husband Bobby Van in The Love Boat S2 E15 "Gopher's Opportunity" as Melody and Phil Livingston, hoteliers who want to hire Gopher. It aired 1/19/1979.

Throughout the 1980s and 1990s, she was featured in many series, including Mr. Merlin (in which she portrayed the character Alexandra, a sorceress); Beverly Hills, 90210; Melrose Place; Magnum, P.I.; Simon & Simon; Too Close for Comfort; and Murder, She Wrote. As an example of her attention to detail, for a 1-minute bit part as an electronics engineer on Hart to Hart in 1980, she met with the first woman to receive an advanced degree in any engineering field from California State University, Los Angeles (working at TRW's Space Park).

Joyce starred in the 1980 film Motel Hell as Edith Olsen and the 1986 film Trick or Treat as Angie Weinbauer, the mother of Eddie Weinbauer (Marc Price).

== Personal life ==
Joyce was married to Bobby Van from 1968 until Van's death from brain cancer in 1980.

In May 1982, Joyce performed at the Alhambra Dinner Theatre in Jacksonville, Florida. Reclusive author J. D. Salinger attended the opening night of the production to see Joyce and accompany her after the show. She told a reporter that it was the first time the two had met, but they had a romantic relationship for several years.

Joyce was married to television producer John Levoff from 1985 until their divorce in 1992.

From September 1999 until his death in 2018, she was married to playwright Neil Simon.

Joyce has a daughter, Taylor Joyce Van, with Bobby Van and a son, Michael Levoff, with John Levoff. Taylor attended Harvard-Westlake School in Los Angeles, where she met future husband Evan Meyer; they were married in October 2003, at which time she was employed as a television executive assistant for Paramount Pictures.
