= Cora Weiss =

American human rights activist (1934–2025)

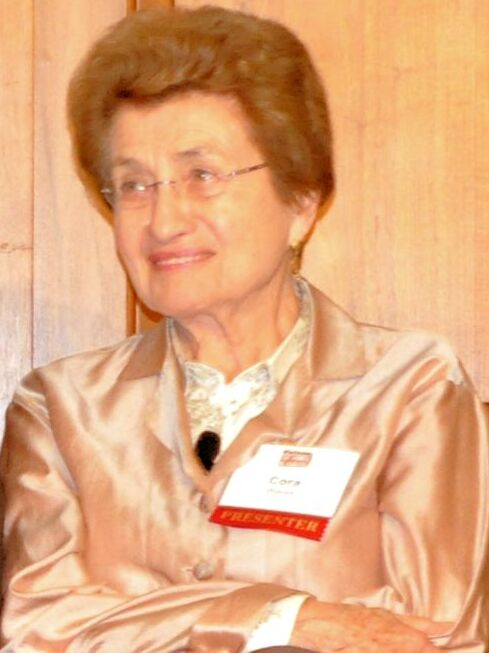
- Weiss in 2015
- Born: Cora Rubin; October 2, 1934; New York City, U.S.
- Died: December 8, 2025 (aged 91); New York City, U.S.
- Education: University of Wisconsin–Madison
- Occupation: Human rights activist
- Years active: 1959–2025
- Organization: Women Strike for Peace
- Spouse: Peter Weiss (m. 1956; died 2025)
- Children: 3
- Parent: Vera D. Rubin; Samuel Rubin
Cora Weiss
President of the International Peace Bureau
- In office 1992–2000
- Preceded by: Maj Britt Theorin
- Succeeded by: Tomas Magnusson

Cora Weiss (née Rubin; October 2, 1934 – December 8, 2025) was an American human rights activist. Through her membership and subsequent leadership of Women Strike for Peace, she organised demonstrations against the Vietnam War and nuclear weapons throughout the 1960s. Weiss also publicly supported gender equality, world peace and civil rights.

== Early life and education ==
Weiss was born on October 2, 1934, in Manhattan, New York City, the daughter of anthropologist Vera D. Rubin and cosmetic businessman and philanthropist Samuel Rubin. The family moved to Croton-on-Hudson, Westchester County, where she was raised in a Liberal Jewish household. Her family were politically active; her mother had volunteered for the presidential campaign of Franklin D. Roosevelt, and his wife, Eleanor Roosevelt, often visited their home, while Weiss's father went on to found the Samuel Rubin Foundation, which supported progressive movements and international cooperation. As a child, Weiss supported her mother in making bandages for the Red Cross and providing food and drink to soldiers preparing for deployment during World War II. The family experienced antisemitism while living in Croton-on-Hudson, and later moved to Fieldston in the Bronx.

Weiss graduated from the Ethical Culture Fieldston School in before attending the University of Wisconsin–Madison. There, she established the Madison chapter of the "Joe Must Go" campaign aiming to recall Joseph McCarthy, a senator infamous for his outspoken anti-communism. She graduated in 1956 with a degree in cultural anthropology.

== Activism ==
Between 1959 and 1961, Weiss co-organised airlifts with Mary Hamanaka to transport 800 African students who had received scholarships to study in the United States.

In 1961, Weiss joined the Riverside chapter of Women Strike for Peace, which organised demonstrations against nuclear weapons testing. She raised awareness of the detection of strontium-90, a carcinogenic element used in nuclear testing, in children's teeth, as well as in food, attracting attention to the campaign. This culminated with John F. Kennedy, the then-President of the United States, signing an agreement with the United Kingdom and the Soviet Union to prohibit atomic testing in the atmosphere.

By the late 1960s, Women Strike for Peace had shifted its focus to demonstrating against the Vietnam War, with Weiss serving as its national leader. During a protest in Washington, D.C., Weiss banged the doors of the headquarters of the Defence Department in the Pentagon with her shoes. She also participated in a demonstration in New York City where a line of women lay on Park Avenue holding signs with the names of Vietnamese people killed in the war. Weiss went on to become the co-chairperson of the New Mobilization Committee to End the War in Vietnam, organising large demonstrations across the United States, including one held on November 15, 1969 in Washington, D.C. with speakers including Coretta Scott King, Mary Travers, George McGovern and Charles Goodell, which called for American soldiers to be withdrawn from Vietnam.

Weiss travelled to Hanoi, North Vietnam, to meet with the North Vietnamese Women's Union, in order to bring back to the United States letters from prisoners of war. She went on to establish and co-chair the Committee of Liaison with Families of Servicemen Detained in North Vietnam, which would go on to transport thousands of letters and parcels between the United States and North Vietnam.

On June 12, 1982, Weiss helped organise an anti-nuclear demonstration in Central Park, New York City, which drew a crowd of around one million demonstrators. Weiss twice was a delegate to the Women's Forums in Nairobi in 1985 and Beijing in 1995. She worked as a volunteer teacher in the New York City public school system.

Weiss served as the United Nations representative of the International Peace Bureau, and as its president between 2000 and 2006. Weiss, a vocal supporter of the United Nations, helped draft its Security Council's resolution 1325, which affirmed the importance of women in the peace process. The resolution was unanimously passed in 2000. She served as president of the Hague Appeal for Peace, a coalition of antiwar groups.

In 2015, the Global Network of Women Peacebuilders established the Cora Weiss Fellowship for Young Women Peacebuilders, which aims to "support the development of young women peacebuilders".

== Personal life and death ==
While at university, she met Peter Weiss, a lawyer, whom she married in 1956. She and her husband had three children; Judy, Tamara and Danny. Weiss raised her children in the Bronx.

Weiss died in Manhattan on December 8, 2025, at the age of 91. She had been predeceased by her husband in November 2025.

Darren Walker, the former president of the Ford Foundation, described Weiss as "courageous and brave and patriotic".
