= William Wright (author) =

American dramatist (1930–2016)

- Born: William Connor Wright Jr. October 22, 1930; Philadelphia, Pennsylvania, United States
- Died: June 4, 2016 (aged 85); Branford, Connecticut, United States
- Education: Yale College
- Occupations: Editor; playwright; author
- Writing career
- Language: English
- Genre: Non-fiction

William Connor Wright Jr. (October 22, 1930 – June 4, 2016) was an American author, editor and playwright. He is best known for his non fiction writing covering a widely divergent list of subjects: from the April in Paris Ball at the Waldorf-Astoria to genetics and behavior to true crime and grand opera.

The great Harvard naturalist and author, E. O. Wilson, said of Wright's Born that Way, Genes, Behavior, Personality: "It takes an independent writer and free spirit to tell the story straight, and thank God Wright has done it."

In addition to Lillian Hellman, the Image and the Woman, Wright's books include The Von Bulow Affair, and two books with and about Luciano Pavarotti: Pavarotti, My Own Story and Pavarotti, My World.

== Biography ==
Wright was born in Philadelphia, the son of William Connor Wright Sr. and Josephine Hartshorne Wright. He graduated from the Germantown Friends School and earned his B.A. at Yale College. In the U.S. Army, he completed training in Chinese at the Army Language School in Monterey, California and served as an Army translator and interpreter in Japan, Okinawa and on the USS Oriskany. He lived for many years in New York City; and in later years, Key West, Florida, as well as in Bucks County, PA. His longtime companion was the writer Barry Raine.

== Career ==
After his Army service, Wright was an editor at Holiday magazine when it was located in Philadelphia and published the likes of John Steinbeck, V.S. Pritchett and Lawrence Durrell. When Holiday became a casualty of the Curtis Publishing Company's disintegration, Wright accepted a bizarre offer from composer Gian Carlo Menotti to become manager of Menotti's Spoleto Festival, then held only in Italy. Wright's job was to oversee the production of some ten events put on by the festival's U.S. side. Each of his events was successful, but the overall festival was a financial disaster. Unnerved, Wright resigned.

After struggling for five years writing magazine articles, Wright accepted an offer to become the editor of Chicago magazine, which he did from 1969 to 1971. Although the magazine was well received by both Chicagoans and advertisers, his tenure was cut short when the magazine was closed down for making jibes at the elder Mayor Richard Daley. Although offered editorial positions at three other publications, Wright turned to writing full-time and continued to do so until a few years before his death, mostly authoring non-fiction books.

== Works ==
=== Books ===
- Ball, 1972, Saturday Review Press
- Heiress, the Rich Life of Marjorie Merriweather Post, 1978, New Republic Books
- Rich Relations, a novel, 1980, G.P. Putnam's Sons
- Pavarotti, My Own Story, 1981, Doubleday
- The Von Bulow Affair, 1983, Delacorte Press
- Lillian Hellman, the Image, the Woman, 1986, Simon and Schuster
- All the Pain Money Can Buy: The Life of Christina Onassis, 1991, Simon and Schuster
- Sins of the Father, with Eileen Franklin. 1991, Crown Publishers
- Pavarotti, My World, 1995, Crown Publishers
- Born that Way, Genes, Behavior, Personality, 1998, Alfred A. Knopf
- Harvard’s Secret Court: The Savage 1920 Purge of Campus Homosexuals, 2005, St. Martin's Press

=== Television ===
- Songs of Naples, a PBS special with Luciano Pavarotti

=== Plays ===
- The Julia Wars, Lillian Hellman's legal battle with Mary McCarthy
- Dreams and Decay in the Winter Palace, the descent of Catherine the Great from idealistic liberalism to decadent conservatism

=== Notable reviews ===
- The Showgirl and Her (Many) Princes a review of Gold Digger by Constance Rosenblum, May 17, 2000, The New York Times.
- The Love-Hate Themes in Albee’s Life and Work a review of EDWARD ALBEE biography by Mel Gussow, August 23, 1999, The New York Times.
- Why Lillian Hellman Remains Fascinating stage view article in The New York Times November 3, 1996.
