= Helen Keller in Her Story =

1954 film by Nancy Hamilton

Helen Keller in Her Story The Unconquered
- Directed by: Nancy Hamilton
- Written by: Nancy Hamilton; James L. Shute
- Produced by: Nancy Hamilton; James L. Shute
- Starring: Helen Keller
- Narrated by: Katharine Cornell
- Edited by: James L. Shute
- Music by: Morgan Lewis
- Distributed by: Albert Margolies and Co.
- Release date: June 15, 1954
- Running time: 55 minutes
- Country: United States
- Language: English

Helen Keller in Her Story (also known as The Unconquered) is a 1954 American biographical documentary about Helen Keller.

In 2023, the film was selected for preservation in the United States National Film Registry by the Library of Congress as being "culturally, historically or aesthetically significant."

== Plot ==
Helen Keller is a woman in her seventies who has been both deaf and blind since she was 19 months old, but that did not keep her from learning how to read, write, or talk (though she was never able to talk as clearly as she wished she was able to), or even from earning a college degree at the age of 24. The film provides an overview of her life up until the time it was made, and then shows what her daily life is like in 1954. With the assistance of her companion Polly Thompson (Anne Sullivan having died in 1936), Helen travels the world giving speeches and advocating for the disabled, responds to the large amounts of mail she receives, visits with notable figures, listens to the radio...

== Production ==
It starred Helen Keller and used newsreel footage of her travels and visits with Dwight Eisenhower, Martha Graham, and others, as well as newly photographed material of her at home. The film was produced and directed by Nancy Hamilton and narrated by her partner, actress Katharine Cornell, and was shot mostly in Pittsburgh. The film was released under the title Helen Keller in Her Story.

== Reception and legacy ==
The premiere took place on 15 June 1954.

The Academy Film Archive preserved Helen Keller in Her Story in 2006. In 2023, the film was chosen for preservation in the National Film Registry by the Library of Congress, being deemed "culturally, historically, or aesthetically significant".

== Accolades ==
It won the Academy Award for Best Documentary Feature in 1955.

== See also ==
- List of films featuring the deaf and hard of hearing
