= Albert Henderson (actor) =

American actor (1915–2004)

- Albert Henderson in Coogan's Bluff (1968)
- Born: Albert Horton Henderson; January 29, 1915; New York City, U.S.
- Died: January 23, 2004 (aged 88); Los Angeles, California, U.S.
- Occupation: Actor
- Years active: 1957–95

Albert Horton Henderson (January 29, 1915 – January 23, 2004) was an American actor. He was born in New York City and died in Los Angeles.

== Career ==
Henderson was a film and television actor, known for his roles in Car 54, Where Are You? (1961–1963), Coogan's Bluff (1968), Greaser's Palace (1972), Serpico (1973), The Postman Always Rings Twice (1981), and Mr. Jones (1993), among others.

== Filmography ==
=== Film ===
- 1968: Madigan – Lt. Strong
- 1968: What's So Bad About Feeling Good? – (uncredited)
- 1968: Coogan's Bluff – Desk sergeant
- 1971: The Pursuit of Happiness – Convict McCardle
- 1972: The Hot Rock – Prison Property Clerk (uncredited)
- 1972: Greaser's Palace – Seaweedhead Greaser
- 1973: Cops and Robbers – Cop
- 1973: Serpico – Peluce
- 1974: The Super Cops – Captain Arbow
- 1975: The Reincarnation of Peter Proud – Police Sergeant
- 1980: Seed of Innocence – Delbert Young
- 1981: Modern Romance – Head Mixer
- 1981: The Postman Always Rings Twice – Art Beeman
- 1987: Barfly – Louie
- 1988: Big Top Pee-wee – Mr. Ryan
- 1989: Three Fugitives – Man in Raincoat
- 1990: The End of Innocence – Grandpa
- 1991: Trancers II – Wino #3
- 1993: Mr. Jones – Patient
- 1995: Leaving Las Vegas – Man at bar

=== Television ===
- 1957: Harbormaster
- 1958-1963: Naked City – Patrolman on Beat / Bartender / Police Driver / Landers
- 1960: Dow Hour of Great Mysteries
- 1961: Car 54, Where Are You? – Officer O'Hara
- 1961: Brenner – Patrolman Franklin
- 1967: N.Y.P.D. – Captain Parnell
- 1973: Koska and His Family
- 1976: Bronk
- 1976: Serpico: The Deadly Game – Sgt. Morgan
- 1976: Sara – Samuel Higgins
- 1976: Kojak – Denny Schwartz / Police Captain
- 1979-1981: Trapper John, M.D. – Guard / Onlooker #1 / Officer #1
- 1980: Rage! – Guard
- 1982: Quincy, M.E. – Judge
- 1994: Star Trek: Deep Space Nine – Cos
- 1995: ER
- 1995: NYPD Blue – Mr. Markham (final appearance)
