= Roger I. Lee =

Roger Irving Lee (August 12, 1881 – October 28, 1965) was an American medical doctor who was president of the American College of Physicians (1941), Massachusetts Medical Society (1943–1944), and the American Medical Association (1945–1946).

== Early life ==
Lee was born on August 12, 1881 in Peabody, Massachusetts to William Thomas and Mary (Farnsworth) Lee. He graduated from Harvard College in 1902 and Harvard Medical School in 1905. He served as a medical house officer at Massachusetts General Hospital for sixteen months, then opened a private practice in the Back Bay. In 1913, he co-authored a scientific paper, on the coagulation of blood, with Paul Dudley White.

== World War I ==
From July 10, 1915 to September 1, 1915, Lee was a member of the Harvard Surgical Unit. He was commissioned a temporary honorary major in the Royal Army Medical Corps and assigned to British Expeditionary Force General Hospital No 22. He was later commissioned a Major in the Medical Reserve Corps. He was called to active duty on May 5, 1917 and assigned to American Base Hospital No. 5 as its chief medical officer. In March 1918, he was appointed commanding officer of the hospital. On June 19, 1918, he was promoted to Lieutenant colonel. On September 6, he was transferred to the Third Army Headquarters and designated a consultant in medicine. He was cited by General John J. Pershing "for exceptionally meritorious and conspicuous services as the Consultant in Surgery, Third Corps, A. E. F." He returned to the United States on February 9, 1919.

== Career ==
In 1914, Lee became the Henry K. Oliver professor of hygiene at Harvard. He was a member of the Secret Court of 1920, an ad hoc disciplinary tribunal of five administrators at Harvard University formed to investigate charges of homosexual activity among the student population. In 1921, he chaired the special committee that planned the new Harvard School of Public Health, which led him to be called the "Father" of the school. He served as acting dean from 1922 to 1923 while during David L. Edsall was in Europe for educational surveys. From 1921 to 1934, he was a member of the public health council of Massachusetts. Lee was elected a fellow of the American Academy of Arts and Sciences in 1923, the American College of Physicians in 1928, and the Royal College of Physicians in 1942.

In 1924, Lee resigned his professorship to return to private practice. He resumed his work at Massachusetts General Hospital, rising to the position of associate chief of the medical service. He became known was one of the country's leading diagnosticians.

In 1930, Lee was elected to the Harvard Board of Overseers. The following year, he and Grenville Clark were elected Fellows of Harvard College (also known as the Harvard Corporation), succeeding William Lawrence and John F. Moors. As a fellow, Lee helped guide Havard through the Great Depression, World War II, and the Second Red Scare. In 1933, he, Clark, Kenneth Ballard Murdock, and James B. Conant were reported by The New York Times to be the leading candidates to succeed A. Lawrence Lowell as President of Harvard University. On May 8, 1933, the fellows announced that they had elected Conant as the next president. Lee was a fellow when the corporation elected Conant's successor, Nathan Pusey. Lee retired from the Harvard Corporation in 1954.

On April 4, 1940, Lee was elected president of the American College of Physicians for the year 1941. From 1943 to 1944, he was president of the Massachusetts Medical Society. He was president of the American Medical Association from 1945 to 1946 and was a leader in the fight against the Wagner-Murray-Dingell Bill, which sought to institute a system of national health insurance in the United States.

Lee authored four books – Health and Disease (1917), The Happy Doctor (1956), A Doctor Speaks His Mind (1958), and Letters from Roger I. Lee (1962).

== Personal life and death ==
On February 26, 1919, Lee married Ella Lowell Lyman in King's Chapel. They had three sons – Roger Jr., Arthur, and William. Lee died October 28, 1965 at his home in Brookline, Massachusetts.
