= Greaser's Palace =

1972 film

- Theatrical release poster.
- Directed by: Robert Downey Sr.
- Written by: Robert Downey Sr.
- Produced by: Cyma Rubin
- Starring: Allan Arbus; Albert Henderson; Michael Sullivan; Luana Anders
- Cinematography: Peter Powell
- Edited by: Bud S. Smith
- Music by: Jack Nitzsche
- Distributed by: Cinema 5
- Release date: July 31, 1972
- Running time: 91 minutes
- Country: United States
- Language: English

Greaser's Palace is a 1972 American Western film written and directed by Robert Downey Sr. It stars Allan Arbus as Jesse, a man with amnesia who heals the sick, resurrects the dead and tap dances on water on the American frontier. A parable based on the life of Jesus in the New Testament, the film has been described as an acid Western.

== Plot ==
Jesse paraglides into a town on the American frontier run by a saloon owner named Seaweedhead Greaser, a tyrant who collects the town's taxes while keeping his mother and favorite mariachi band in cages, and suffers from chronic constipation. Jesse has amnesia and remembers nothing except that he is anticipated by talent agent Morris, telling people that he's on his way to Jerusalem, where he will become a singer, dancer and actor. Greaser murders his son, Lamy Homo Greaser, for being a homosexual, and Jesse resurrects the dead man.

Subsequently, Jesse heals the sick and tap dances on water. Greaser's saloon is losing money due to the declining popularity of his daughter Cholera's performances, so he hires Jesse to sing and dance at the saloon. Jesse concludes his act with him bleeding stigmatically from his hands. The audience loves it, but the talent agent pans the act. Jesse begins a relationship with a woman who ultimately crucifies him so he can resurrect her son, who was killed by Indians.

== Cast ==
- Albert Henderson as Seaweed Head Greaser
- Luana Anders as Cholera Greaser
- James Antonio as Vernon
- Allan Arbus as Jesse
- Toni Basil as Indian Girl
- Don Calfa as Morris
- Woody Chambliss as Father
- Pablo Ferro as Indian
- Stanley Gottlieb as Spitunia
- Joe Madden as Man With Painting
- George Morgan as Coo Coo
- Ron Nealy as Card Man / Ghost
- Michael Sullivan as Lamy "Homo" Greaser
- Hervé Villechaize as Mr. Spitunia
- Lawrence Wolf as French Padre
- Elsie Downey as The Woman
- Jackson Haynes as Rope Man
- Alex Hitchcock as Nun
- John Paul Hudson as Smiley
- Larry Moyer as Captain Good
- Don Smolen as Gip
- Rex King as Turquoise Skies

Cast notes:

- Robert Downey Jr., the son of the writer-director of the film, has an uncredited role as a child. Elsie Downey who played "the Woman" was Robert Downey Sr.'s wife. Also in the cast were Allyson Downey and Stacy Sheehan, Downey Sr.'s daughter and niece.

== Production ==
Greaser's Palace, which was shot on location in New Mexico, was produced by Cyma Rubin, a neophyte Broadway producer who gave Downey a million dollars to make the film. Downey had previously made the cult hit Putney Swope (1969) as well as lesser-known films such as Pound (1970), Babo 73 (1964) and Chafed Elbows (1966).

== Reception ==
Although Time magazine's Jay Cocks called it "Downey's funniest, most accomplished and most audacious film yet" and "the most adventurous American movie so far this year", Greaser's Palace did not receive generally good critical reviews. Thomas Meehan, writing in the Saturday Review said "Robert Downey seems to have absolutely everything it takes to be a successful movie director except talent," and thought that this film was "even worse than his earlier pictures – an absurdist, incomprehensible Western that mixes in scatology, William Morris agents and the second coming of Christ." Kevin Thomas, the critic for the Los Angeles Times wrote of it "...the film is so utterly devoid of wit and imagination that the unremitting gross behavior and language it wallows in is quickly revolting." Kathleen Carroll, critic for the New York Daily News asked "Does this weird concoction of Harvard Lampoon parody, half-serious symbolism and silly slapstick really work?"

The film, which was presented at the Telluride Film Festival in 1976, was not a commercial success.

On the review aggregator website Rotten Tomatoes, 50% of 6 critics' reviews are positive, with an average rating of 4/10.

The film was restored by Anthology Film Archives in 2025.

== See also ==
- List of American films of 1972
