= Doctor Jazz (musical) =

1975 Broadway musical

- Music: Luther Henderson; Buster Davis
- Lyrics: Buster Davis
- Book: Buster Davis
- Premiere: March 19, 1975: Winter Garden Theatre
- Productions: 1975 Broadway

Doctor Jazz is a 1975 musical with music by Luther Henderson and Buster Davis, with a book and lyrics by Davis. The musical premiered on Broadway in 1975 and was nominated for three Tony Awards for Best Choreography (Donald McKayle), Best Actress in a Musical (Lola Falana) and Best Costume Design (Raoul Pene Du Bois). The plot follows Edna Mae Sheridan and her mother, who owns a brothel in the Storyville district of New Orleans, while the show takes its name from the 1920s jazz standard "Doctor Jazz".

== Production history ==
Hal Linden was offered the lead in the play, but turned it down to accept the lead role in the TV series Barney Miller (which at the time, was only guaranteed for two episodes).

Directed and choreographed by Donald McKayle and produced by Cyma Rubin, the original Broadway production at the Winter Garden Theatre struggled in previews, opened March 19, 1975, and closed after only five official performances.

== Original cast and characters ==
Character	Broadway (1975)
Steve Anderson	Bobby Van
Edna Mae Sheridan	Lola Falana
Georgia Sheridan	Lillian Hayman
Harriet Lee	Peggy Pope
Jonathan Jackson Jr.	Jack Landrón
Henry / Rudy / Harry	Paul Eichel
Pete	Eron Tabor

== Musical numbers ==
Act I

- "Doctor Jazz"§ – Steve
- "We've Got Connections" – Steve, Edna, Harriet
- "Georgia Shows 'Em How" – Georgia
- "Cleopatra Had A Jazz Band"§ – Steve
- "Juba Dance" – Edna
- "Charleston Rag"§ – Company
- "I've Got Elgin Watch Movements In My Hips" – Edna
- "Blues My Naughty Sweetie Gave To Me"§ – Company
- "Good-Time Flat Blues"§ – Georgia

Act II

- "Those Sheik-Of-Araby Blues" – Company
- "Swanee Strut" – Steve
- "All I Want Is My Black Baby Back" – Edna
- "Everybody Leaves You" – Steve
- "Free and Easy" – Company
- "I Love It"§ – Company

Songs marked '§' were pre-existing songs from the jazz era that were included in the show.

An original cast album was released following the show's closing.
