= Mr. Jones (1993 film) =

1993 film directed by Mike Figgis

- Theatrical release poster
- Directed by: Mike Figgis
- Written by: Eric Roth; Michael Cristofer
- Produced by: Debra Greenfield; Alan Greisman
- Starring: Richard Gere; Lena Olin; Anne Bancroft
- Cinematography: Juan Ruiz Anchía
- Edited by: Tom Rolf
- Music by: Maurice Jarre
- Production company: Rastar
- Distributed by: TriStar Pictures
- Release date: October 8, 1993
- Running time: 114 minutes
- Country: United States
- Language: English
- Budget: $25 million
- Box office: $8,345,845

Mr. Jones is a 1993 American romantic drama film directed by Mike Figgis, and starring Richard Gere, Lena Olin, Anne Bancroft, Tom Irwin and Delroy Lindo.

== Plot ==
Mr. Jones, a charismatic and dynamic man, talks his way into a job on a construction site, only to have a manic episode and come close to jumping off a building, claiming he can fly. Saved from jumping by fellow construction worker Howard, he is transported to a psychiatric hospital.

Jones is misdiagnosed as schizophrenic, medicated, and released due to lack of space related to budget cuts at the hospital run by Dr. Catherine Holland. After Jones charms Dr. Elizabeth "Libbie" Bowen as he checks out, she takes an interest in his case as she struggles with her divorce and other patients.

In the midst of another manic episode, Jones impulsively spends large amounts of money on a date and jumps up onto the stage during a concert performance of Beethoven's Ninth Symphony and starts conducting. Arrested, sent back to the hospital, and diagnosed correctly by Dr. Bowen as having bipolar disorder, he reveals to Bowen and her colleague Dr. Patrick Shaye that he has been in and out of hospitals for twenty years but always refuses treatment for his condition. Bowen tries to have Jones involuntarily committed for treatment, but with his manic energy, Jones is charming and rational during a competency hearing. He apologizes for the incidents at the concert and construction site and challenges Bowen's diagnosis because she has never seen him in a depressive cycle. He is released.

Bowen gives Jones a ride home from the hearing. He flirts with her while she tries to get more info from him about his illness. Jones reveals he resists treatment because he enjoys the benefits of his mania. Despite Bowen's efforts to convince him, he stops taking his prescribed stablilizing medicine lithium. Howard, worried about Jones despite his cheerful and friendly mood, contacts Bowen who discovers Jones severely depressed at his apartment. She helps him check into her hospital.

Bowen begins helping Jones with psychotherapy, and he starts to open up. Howard visits Jones, and they become friends. Jones rescues Bowen during a violent attack by a patient, and they strengthen their bond as she comforts him while he struggles with missing the benefits of his mania while on medication and life at the hospital. As romantic attraction between Jones and Bowen grows, she contacts his ex-girlfriend to learn more about his past. Furious at the invasion of his privacy, Jones tries to leave the hospital, but Bowen follows him, confesses her feelings for him, and they go to bed together. Feeling guilty about the inappropriate relationship, Bowen confesses to Shaye who insists she stop treating Jones and seeing him at all. Jones is transferred to another hospital but soon checks himself out. Upset over this and the suicide of another one of her patients, Amanda Chang, Bowen quits her job.

Jones goes to Howard's home. Howard deduces that Jones is having another manic episode and contacts Bowen when Jones takes off towards the construction site where he previously tried to jump off the building. This time Jones is able to calm himself just as Bowen arrives. With Bowen's help, Jones finally accepts the need to treat his condition, and the two happily reconcile.

== Cast ==
- Richard Gere as Mr. Jones
- Lena Olin as Dr. Elizabeth "Libbie" Bowen
- Anne Bancroft as Dr. Catherine Holland
- Tom Irwin as Dr. Patrick Shaye
- Delroy Lindo as Howard
- Lauren Tom as Amanda Chang
- Bruce Altman as David
- Lisa Malkiewicz as Susan
- Albert Henderson as Patient
- Thomas Kopache as Mr. Wilson
- Peter Jurasik as Dr. Rosen
- Anna Maria Horsford as Judge Harris
- Kelli Williams as Kelli
- Sal Lopez as Henry
- Scott Thomson as Conrad
- Bill Moseley as Worker
- Thomas Mikal Ford as Arnie / Violent Patient
- Lela Ivey as Lisa
- Valente Rodriguez as Orderly
- David Brisbin as Mr. Warner
- Dana Lee as Mr. Chang
- Irene Tsu as Mrs. Chang
- Kathy Kinney as Homeless Lady
- Annie McEnroe as Crying Woman
- John Durbin as Patient
- Lucinda Jenney as Christine
- Taylor Negron as Motorcycle Man
- Sheryl Lee as June (uncredited)
- Bill Pullman as Construction Site Foreman (uncredited)

== Production ==
To prepare for the film, Richard Gere, Mike Figgis and Eric Roth studied bipolar disorder. Gere met with several people who have the disorder to gain insight and knowledge on what to accurately portray.

Michelle Pfeiffer gave up the female lead to take on the part of Catwoman in Batman Returns.

Although it was not released until 1993, most of the filming began to take place in November 1991 and was entirely finished in early 1992.

== Reception ==
The film was released to mixed reviews. On the review aggregator website Rotten Tomatoes, 43% of 14 critics' reviews are positive. Metacritic, which uses a weighted average, assigned the film a score of 47 out of 100, based on 24 critics, indicating "mixed or average" reviews. Audiences polled by CinemaScore gave the film an average grade of "B−" on an A+ to F scale.

Movie historian Leonard Maltin remarked that "Gere is fine, but his onscreen behavior turns this into The Jester of Tides." Indeed, Gere received praise for his performance as the troubled title character. Roger Ebert of the Chicago Sun-Times gave the film three out of four stars, but noted that it would have been better if the romance plot between Jones and Libbie was left out, since it appeared forced and contrived.

The movie debuted at No. 7 at the box office.
