= Bobby Van =

American actor and dancer (1928–1980)

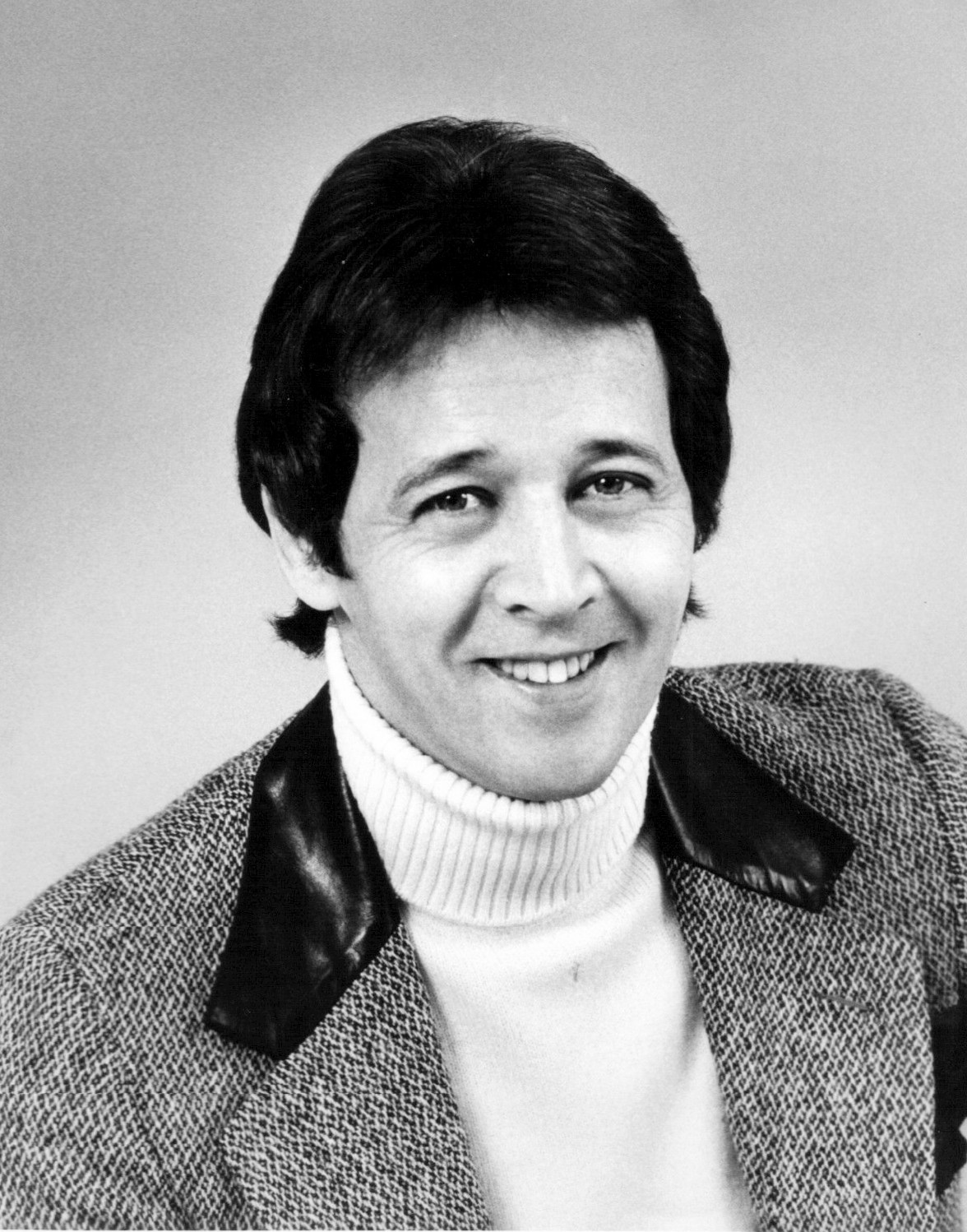
- Van in 1975
- Born: Robert Jack Stein; December 6, 1928; The Bronx, New York, U.S.
- Died: July 31, 1980 (aged 51); Los Angeles, California, U.S.
- Resting place: Mount Sinai Memorial Park
- Occupations: Actor; singer; dancer; game show host
- Years active: 1949–1980
- Spouses: Diane Garrett (m. 1952; div. 1962) Elaine Joyce (m. 1968)
- Children: 2

Bobby Van (born Robert Jack Stein; December 6, 1928 – July 31, 1980) was an American actor, singer, and dancer. He was known for his career on Broadway, in film musicals and television from the 1950s through the 1970s. He was also a game show host and panelist. He was nominated for a Tony Award for Best Actor in a Musical for his performance in No, No, Nanette.

== Early life ==
Van was born to Jewish vaudeville parents in The Bronx, New York City, and grew up backstage, witnessing many memorable Depression-era acts. Originally, Van took King as his stage name (after his father's stage name, from the trio "Gordon, Reed and King"). He finally opted for Van, after seeing a Van Johnson poster hanging in his sister's bedroom. In a 1976 interview, Van said he had legalized his name change from 'Stein'.

== Career ==
Van began his career as a musician, playing trumpet. When his band played a venue in the Catskills, Van was asked to fill in as a song and dance man for another act. His act drew rave reviews and gave Van a thrill performing live as a solo act. He went on to appear in several Broadway musicals.

In the early 1950s, Van received a contract with Metro-Goldwyn-Mayer and appeared in several films there, including the title role in The Affairs of Dobie Gillis in 1953 and roles in the musicals Because You're Mine and Kiss Me, Kate. Reviewer Hal Erickson noted that "Van will always be remembered as the ecstatic young fellow who made like a human pogo stick during an expansive production number in Small Town Girl (1953)."

Van appeared with Mickey Rooney in films and television during the 1960s, including three episodes of Rooney's ABC sitcom Mickey, as a freeloading brother-in-law. Van also did some choreography, as had his father years earlier.

In the 1970s, Van and his second wife, Elaine Joyce, made several appearances on game shows such as Tattletales and Match Game. Van also hosted the TV game shows Showoffs,The Fun Factory, and Make Me Laugh.

Van starred in the 1971 Broadway revival of No, No, Nanette, for which he was nominated for a Tony Award. In 1973, he appeared in the musical remake of Lost Horizon, his final appearance in a film musical. His novelty dance number from Small Town Girl (1953) was featured in the MGM retrospective That's Entertainment, Part II (1976). In 1978, Van portrayed swindler Warren Custer in the episode "The Two-Million-Dollar Stowaway" of the NBC crime drama series The Eddie Capra Mysteries. In 1979, he appeared in the original Battlestar Galactica episode "Greetings from Earth" as the robot Hector, working alongside veteran song and dance man Ray Bolger (Vector).

In June 1977, Van appeared in the musical Anything Goes as Billy Crocker at the Kenley Players in Dayton, Ohio.

In August 1979, Van appeared in the musical Damn Yankees as Young Joe with the San Jose Civic Light Opera in San Jose, California. His co-star was Van Johnson. Bobby Van and wife Elaine Joyce appeared in Love Boat S2 E16 "Gopher's Opportunity", as Phil and Melody Livingston, hoteliers who want to hire Gopher. The episode was originally broadcast on January 20, 1979.

== Personal life ==
Van married starlet Diane Garrett in September 1952, though the marriage was kept secret until January 1953.

Van and Garrett attempted to have children for several years and, after losing a baby in 1956, they adopted son Peter in 1961, nine months after taking him in as a five-day-old baby.

In 1959, both Van and Garrett were injured when their car was rear-ended, and sued the other driver, seeking $107,000. Garrett said she was unable to move for three weeks after the accident; both she and Van claimed back injury. Van was awarded $1,500 and Garrett was awarded $5,000. Judy Garland, who was a passenger in the Vans' vehicle, testified in court for them.

The couple separated in January 1964 and a divorce was final on September 27, 1966, despite rumors of an early reconsideration and a reconciliation in July 1964. Van had returned to town as his son was undergoing emergency hip surgery, not to reconcile. In November 1964, Walter Winchell wrote in his column that Van "(recently divorced after a dozen years) hopes to persuade actress Emmaline Henry to be his new spouse."

Van married Broadway actress Elaine Joyce in 1968. An announcement was issued on October 30, 1967, that they had wed, but they had not. In November, a Hollywood column mentioned that Van said that he and Joyce planned to marry on December 2, 1967. In February 1968, it was announced that they would marry in Los Angeles on March 21. Van and Joyce were finally married in Las Vegas on May 1, 1968. One week later, Van filed for an annulment citing "fraud" and a lack of consummation, claiming that Joyce "told him she wanted to have children but this was only to induce him into marriage". An article states that Van said that Joyce felt "so unhappy and insecure, it's the only thing to do." A preliminary divorce was filed in 1968, with Joyce listed as Elaine Pinchot. The divorce was never finalized, and the couple remained married until Van's death in 1980. Their daughter Taylor was born in 1976.

=== Illness and death ===
In February 1980, Van began to experience headaches that continued for two weeks before being diagnosed with a malignant brain tumor. Van hid his illness and continued to work, including as host of that year's Mrs. America Pageant. He later lost control of his left side and used a wheelchair.

Van died in Los Angeles on July 31, 1980. He is interred at Mount Sinai Memorial Park Cemetery in Los Angeles. In an interview from December 1981, Joyce said, "Bobby and I would have been married forever. There was no question about it".

== Filmography ==
=== Films ===
| Year | Title | Role | Notes |
|---|---|---|---|
| 1952 | Skirts Ahoy! | Himself | Uncredited |
| 1952 | Because You're Mine | Artie Pilcer | |
| 1953 | Small Town Girl | Ludwig Schlemmer | |
| 1953 | The Affairs of Dobie Gillis | Dobie Gillis | |
| 1953 | Kiss Me Kate | 'Gremio' | |
| 1961 | The Ladies Man | | Choreographer |
| 1961 | Yves Montand on Broadway | Himself | Guest performer |
| 1962 | It's Only Money | | Choreographer |
| 1966 | The Navy vs. the Night Monsters | Ens. Rutherford Chandler | |
| 1972 | Doomsday Machine | Danny | |
| 1973 | Lost Horizon | Harry Lovett | |
| 1975 | The Lion Roars Again | | MGM short subject |

=== Television ===
| Year | Title | Role | Notes |
|---|---|---|---|
| 1957 | The George Gobel Show | Himself | Season 4, episode 4 |
| 1960 | The Revlon Revue | Himself | Season 1, episode 5 |
| 1962 | The Tonight Show | Himself | 1 episode (between hosts Paar and Carson) |
| 1963, 1976 | The Tonight Show Starring Johnny Carson | Himself | 2 episodes |
| 1969 | The Jonathan Winters Show | Himself | Season 2, episode 14 |
| 1975 | 29th Annual Tony Awards | Himself | One of several hosts |
| 1975 | The Invisible Man | Tony Bernard | Episode: "Eyes Only" |
| 1975 | Showoffs | Himself | Series host |
| 1976 | Wonder Woman | Monty Burns | Episode: "Beauty on Parade" |
| 1978 | The Hardy Boys | Tom | Season 3, 2 episodes |
| 1978 | CHiPs | Eddie | Episode: "Trick or Trick" |
| 1978 | Vega$ | Eddie Banning | Episode: "Love, Laugh, and Die" |
| 1978 | Flying High | Meltzer | Episode: "The Marcy Connection" |
| 1979 | Battlestar Galactica | Hector | Episode: "Greetings from Earth" |
| 1979 | The Love Boat | Phil Livingston | Episode: "Gopher's Opportunity" |
| 1979–1980 | Make Me Laugh | Himself | Series host |
| 1980 | Beyond Westworld | Danny | Episode: "My Brother's Keeper" |
| 1980 | The Hustler of Muscle Beach | Emcee | TV movie |
| 1980 | Mrs. America Pageant | Himself | Host |

== Stage work ==
- Alive and Kicking (1950)
- On Your Toes (1954)
- Oklahoma! (1959)
- Pal Joey (1961)
- The Tunnel of Love (1963; Westchester County Playhouse, Dobbs Ferry, NY)
- No, No, Nanette (1971–73)
- Doctor Jazz (1975)
- The Music Man (1977; Marriott's Lincolnshire Theatre, Lincolnshire, IL)
- Anything Goes (1977; Kenley Players, Ohio)
- Damn Yankees (1979; San Jose Civic Light Opera, California)
