= Lambros Comitas =

American anthropologist (1927–2020)

Lambros Comitas (September 29, 1927 – March 5, 2020) was Gardner Cowles Professor of Anthropology and Education at Teachers College, Columbia University. A product of Columbia University, he received the A.B. from Columbia College in 1948 after service in the United States Army, and was awarded the Ph.D. in anthropology in 1962 from the Columbia Faculty of Political Science. Influential figures in his early professional years were Conrad Arensberg, Marvin Harris, Charles Wagley, Margaret Mead, and Vera D. Rubin from the Columbia faculty and M. G. Smith, the eminent British-trained anthropologist whom he first met during field work in Jamaica.

== Background ==
His teaching career in anthropology began in 1958 at Columbia University. Six years later he joined the Department of Philosophy and Social Sciences at Teachers College, Columbia University as associate professor. In his new position, he helped create doctoral programs in Applied Anthropology and Anthropology and Education. A full professor by 1967, Comitas directed the Division of Philosophy, the Social Sciences, and Education (1979–1996) and the Institute for International Studies (1984- ) at Teachers College. He was director of the Institute for Latin American and Iberian Studies from 1977 to 1984 at Columbia. He was awarded the Gardner Cowles Chair in Anthropology and Education in 1988.

In tandem with university responsibilities, he was connected to the Research Institute for the Study of Man, for years a leading Caribbean-focused foundation, first as associate director (1959–1985) and then as director (1985–2001), a connection that led him professionally back to the West Indies and forward to Bolivia and the Soviet Union. During the formative years of the Peace Corps (1961–1962), he helped train two of the earliest units in the field (St. Lucia I and Jamaica I), evaluated country teams in Bolivia, St. Lucia, Barbados and Jamaica and negotiated and programmed in British Guiana, Trinidad and Tobago, Dominica and Barbados. He co-directed the first Peace Corps research project, a complex study of considerable importance that led to the book Changing Rural Society: A Study of Communities in Bolivia and other publications.

Thomas Bailey, President of Teachers College, and Stephanie J. Rowley, Teachers College Provost, summarized his personality, career, and accomplishments in an obituary published in The New York Times on March 8, 2020: "world-renowned anthropologist, world-class humorist and raconteur, cherished mentor, respected academic statesman, and beloved member of our faculty for more than 56 years as the Gardner Cowles Professor of Anthropology & Education. One of the world's preeminent authorities on Hispanic and non-Hispanic cultures in the Caribbean, Professor Comitas helped develop the concept of occupational multiplicity, identifying workers who defied classification as peasant farmers or other categories. His work provided important insights for government programs and international aid aimed at improving people's economic circumstances. And for nearly 40 years, beginning in 1967, he reviewed and annotated more than 2,000 anthropological publications for his biennial West Indian section in the Handbook of Latin American Studies, issued by the Library of Congress. More recently, Professor Comitas focused on the role of visual anthropology in research, using a photo and video database that he had built over many years. Professor Comitas also had a transformational impact on Teachers College. He helped to create doctoral programs both in Applied Anthropology and Anthropology & Education. From 1979 through 1996, he directed what was then TC's Division of Philosophy, the Social Sciences, and Education, as well as the Institute for International Studies. He also directed Columbia's Institute for Latin American and Iberian Studies and was affiliated with the Research Institute for the Study of Man, a leading Caribbean-focused foundation. Finally, he derived enormous joy and pride from overseeing the doctoral dissertations of some 100 students, many of whom went on to become accomplished scholars. There is no replacing a scholar and human being of Lambros Comitas' caliber. He was cherished, and will be greatly missed."

=== Fields of expertise ===
As an anthropologist, Comitas was known primarily as a Caribbeanist who carried out field studies in both the Hispanic and non-Hispanic Caribbean. However, he also worked in Bolivia, Greece, the former Soviet Republic of Georgia, the Canary Islands and Andorra. A leading figure in problem-related fieldwork, he contributed to the understanding of maritime communities in the Antilles; community structure and rural education in Bolivia; education and change in the Creole Caribbean; and was well known for developing the concept of occupational multiplicity. Contributing to burgeoning Caribbean research in the latter half of the 20th century, he completed two projects designed to compile a definitive bibliography of the scholarly and scientific literature of the non-Hispanic Caribbean from 1900 to 1975. In addition, from 1967 to 2005, he reviewed and annotated some two thousand anthropological publications for his biennial West Indian section in the Handbook of Latin American Studies, an authoritative bibliographic source issued by the Library of Congress. In more recent years, Comitas developed a long-held interest in the research utility of visual anthropology focusing on a photo and video database that he accumulated over the years.

A specialist on the sociocultural aspects of drug usage, Comitas was intimately linked to several innovative studies of drugs and society (1972–1981) in the Caribbean and in Greece, supported by the National Institute of Mental Health and National Institute on Drug Abuse. His work on drugs was best highlighted by the acclaimed and controversial sociomedical study Ganja in Jamaica (1975), a multidisciplinary work that explores the chronic use of cannabis in socio-medical perspective finding few or no negative medical consequences due to heavy marihuana use. A number of books, dissertations and articles, by project staff and former students, based on evidence drawn from the Jamaica and Greek studies generally supported the benign results of the original studies.

=== Comitas's commitment to ethnography ===
A firm believer in the necessity for thoroughly preparing fledgling anthropologists, Comitas taught in a graduate department for well over fifty years. A ferocious advocate of field training, he served as executive secretary of the unique Columbia-Cornell-Harvard-Illinois Summer Field Study Program; directed seven summer-long graduate student training sessions to Barbados, Bolivia, Dominican Republic, Jamaica and Andorra; and he initiated the Ruth Landes Memorial Fund that, during his tenure as director, provided grants to universities for developing systematic field training at these places. He considered that his effort to form several generations of anthropologists in the United States was perhaps his most satisfying professional accomplishment. In this context, he had sponsored well over a hundred of his students to receive the doctorate in anthropology.

== Awards and honours ==
Comitas was the recipient of many awards, including the John Simon Guggenheim Fellowship and grants from Fulbright, Spencer Foundation, the National Institute of Mental Health, the National Institute on Drug Abuse, NATO, the U.S. Office of Education, the Government of Andorra and the government of the Canary Islands. He was a fellow of the American Anthropological Association and the New York Academy of Sciences, and was elected president of the Society for Applied Anthropology in 1970, as well as a member of the National Academy of Education in 1979.
