= No, No, Nanette =

Musical by Otto Harbach and Vincent Youmans

- 1971 revival recording; Illustration by Hilary Knight
- Music: Vincent Youmans
- Lyrics: Irving Caesar; Otto Harbach
- Book: Otto Harbach; Frank Mandel; 1971: Burt Shevelove
- Basis: Emil Nyitray and Frank Mandel's play My Lady Friends
- Productions: 1924: Chicago; 1925: West End; 1925: Broadway; 1971: Broadway revival
- Awards: Drama Desk Award for Outstanding Book

No, No, Nanette is a musical with a book by Otto Harbach and Frank Mandel based on Mandel's 1919 Broadway play My Lady Friends; lyrics by Irving Caesar and Harbach; and music by Vincent Youmans. The farcical story centers on three couples who find themselves together at a cottage in Atlantic City, New Jersey, in the midst of a blackmail scheme focusing on a fun-loving Manhattan heiress who has run off, leaving an unhappy fiancé. Its songs include the well-known "Tea for Two" and "I Want to Be Happy".

After a pre-Broadway tour in 1924, the musical was revised for a production later 1924 in Chicago, where it became a hit and ran for more than a year. In 1925 No, No, Nanette opened both on Broadway and in London's West End, running for 321 and 665 performances, respectively. Film versions (1930 and 1940) and revivals followed. A Broadway revival in 1971, with the book adapted by Burt Shevelove, was a success, running for 861 performances.

A popular myth holds that the show was financed by selling baseball's Boston Red Sox superstar Babe Ruth to the New York Yankees, resulting in the "Curse of the Bambino". However, it was Mandel's original play, My Lady Friends, rather than No, No, Nanette, that was directly financed by the Ruth sale.

== History ==
=== Original production and aftermath ===
No, No, Nanette was not successful in its first pre-Broadway tour in 1924. When the production arrived in Chicago, producer Harry Frazee re-cast the show with new stars, had the book rewritten and asked Youmans and Caesar to write additional songs. These additional songs, "Tea for Two" and "I Want to Be Happy", would become the hit songs of the show. The Chicago production was a hit and ran for over a year. Frazee capitalized on this success by mounting a production in the West End in London. The show opened on March 11, 1925, at the Palace Theatre, where it starred Binnie Hale, Joseph Coyne and George Grossmith Jr. and became a hit, running for 665 performances. The London production featured two songs that were not included in the earlier U.S. productions: "I've Confessed to the Breeze" and "Take a Little One-Step". Three touring productions were circulating throughout the U.S. when the Broadway production finally opened on September 16, 1925, at the Globe Theatre, starring Louise Groody and Charles Winninger. It ran for 321 performances.

The musical was translated into various languages and enjoyed regional productions, U.S. tours and international success through the end of the decade. It was made into films in both 1930 and 1940, with both film adaptations featuring ZaSu Pitts. A 1950 film, Tea for Two, was a very loose adaptation of the show. It starred Doris Day, Gordon MacRae, Eve Arden (who was also in the 1940 film), and Billy DeWolfe. The musical was seen with decreasing frequency in the following decades.

In 1926 Frazee produced what he marketed as a companion musical to No, No, Nanette at the Four Cohans Theatre in Chicago: the musical Yes, Yes, Yvette. It premiered on December 5, 1926, to positive reviews in the Chicago press and in Billboard. After the production had a successful run in Chicago, it was a flop on Broadway in 1927.

=== 1971 revival and later productions ===
For the nostalgic 1971 Broadway revival conceived and produced by Harry Rigby, Burt Shevelove freely adapted the book from the 1925 original. While the 1925 book was considered quite racy at the time of the original production, Shevelove wrote from a nostalgic perspective, depicting the 1920s as a time of innocent fun. He made extensive changes and cuts to the book, but most of the original score was left intact, with only a few cuts and interpolations. The cast featured veteran screen star Ruby Keeler and included Helen Gallagher, Bobby Van, Jack Gilford, Patsy Kelly and Susan Watson. A young Ed Dixon was in the ensemble. Busby Berkeley, nearing the end of his career, was credited as supervising the production, although members of the cast and crew later stated that his name was his primary contribution to the show. Among a number of extensive dance sequences, Keeler – who returned from retirement for the production – was lauded for energetic tap routines incorporated into "I Want to Be Happy" and "Take a Little One-Step". Rigby's acrimonious relationship with fellow producer Cyma Rubin led to Rubin's terminating Rigby's contract and removing his credit as co-producer, but insiders claimed he deserved full credit for the show's success. Rigby later accepted a $300,000 settlement from Rubin.

The 1971 production was well-reviewed and ran for 861 performances. It sparked interest in the revival of similar musicals from the 1920s and 1930s. Tony and Drama Desk Awards went to costume designer Raoul Pène Du Bois, choreographer Donald Saddler, and Gallagher as best leading actress; Kelly won a Tony as best featured actress, and Shevelove earned a Drama Desk Award for outstanding book. This production transferred to London in 1973, with a cast starring Anna Neagle, Anne Rogers, Tony Britton and Teddy Green. Further tours and international productions followed. Performance rights are available for the 1971 version, which has become the most frequently performed musical of the 1920s.

City Center's Encores! presented a semi-staged production of No, No, Nanette in May 2008, directed by Walter Bobbie, with choreography by Randy Skinner, starring Sandy Duncan, Beth Leavel and Rosie O'Donnell.

=== Curse of the Bambino ===
Some years after the premiere, it was claimed that producer Harry Frazee, a former owner of the Boston Red Sox, financed No, No, Nanette by selling baseball superstar Babe Ruth to the New York Yankees, resulting in the "Curse of the Bambino", which, according to a popular superstition, kept the Red Sox from winning the World Series from 1918 until 2004. In the 1990s, that story was partially debunked on the grounds that the sale of Ruth had occurred five years earlier. Leigh Montville discovered during research for his 2006 book, The Big Bam: The Life and Times of Babe Ruth, that No, No, Nanette had originated as a non-musical stage play called My Lady Friends, which opened on Broadway in December 1919. That play had, indeed, been financed by the Ruth sale to the Yankees.

== Synopsis ==
Based on 1971 Revised Production

Act I
1925. The home of James Smith, New York City.

Jimmy Smith, a millionaire Bible publisher, is married to the overly frugal Sue. Jimmy thus has plenty of disposable income, and, because he likes to use his money to make people happy, he has secretly become the (platonic) benefactor of three beautiful women: Betty from Boston, Winnie from Washington, D.C., and Flora from San Francisco. Sue's best friend, Lucille, is married to Jimmy's lawyer and friend, Billy Early. Lucille is a spendthrift and delights in spending all the money Billy makes. Jimmy and Sue have a young ward, Nanette, who they hope will become a respectable young lady. At Jimmy and Sue's home in New York, many young men come to call on Nanette. Lucille advises the young people that having one steady boyfriend is better than many flirtations ("Too Many Rings Around Rosie"). Tom Trainor, Billy's nephew and assistant, works up the courage to tell Nanette that he loves her, and she returns his sentiments ("I've Confessed to the Breeze"). Tom wants to settle down and get married as soon as possible, but Nanette has an untapped wild side and wants to have some fun first.

Jimmy's lady friends are attempting to blackmail him, and he, afraid that Sue will find out about them, enlists Billy's legal help to discreetly ease the girls out of his life. Billy suggests that Jimmy take refuge in Philadelphia. Unknown to Jimmy, Billy decides to take Tom and meet the three ladies at the Smiths' seaside home, Chickadee Cottage, in Atlantic City, New Jersey ("Call of the Sea"). Sue and Lucille, hearing that both their husbands will be away on business, also decide to take a vacation to the cottage.

Nanette wants to go to Atlantic City with her friends, but Sue forbids her to go. Jimmy, wanting to make Nanette happy, gives her $200 and agrees to secretly take her to Chickadee Cottage, with the grumpy cook, Pauline, acting as Nanette's chaperone ("I Want to Be Happy"). Nanette is tired of everyone (especially Tom) trying to control her behavior and dreams of the extravagant fun she will have ("No No Nanette"). To tease Tom, she shows him the $200 and refuses to tell him how she got it. Tom angrily breaks off his relationship with Nanette, and, under the pretense that she is going to visit her grandmother in Trenton, New Jersey, Nanette leaves for Atlantic City (Finaletto Act I).

Act II
The garden and living room of Chickadee Cottage, Atlantic City.

Nanette arrives in Atlantic City and quickly becomes the most popular girl on the beach ("Peach on the Beach"). Meanwhile, Jimmy crosses paths with his three girlfriends, who confront him with the promises he made to them ("The Three Happies"). Tom meets up with Nanette, and they resolve their quarrel, fantasizing about being happily married one day ("Tea for Two"). Lucille runs into Billy, and though she is surprised to meet him in Atlantic City, she assures him that she does not mind whether he spends time with other women as long as she's there to watch – and he comes home with her at the end of the evening ("You Can Dance with Any Girl At All").

Sue is shocked to find Nanette in Atlantic City. Nanette at first lies and said she was only visiting her grandmother in Trenton, but Sue knows that cannot be true: Nanette's only living grandmother lives in Omaha, Nebraska. Nanette admits that she actually spent the night in Atlantic City. Against her protests, Sue arranges for her to go back to New York with Pauline. Sue overhears Billy speaking to the women and, assuming that he is having an affair with them, tells Lucille. Billy, to keep Jimmy's secret, does not deny it, and Lucille says she is leaving him. Meanwhile, Tom, shocked by Nanette's behavior, breaks off their relationship. Jimmy is oblivious to the confusion he's created (Finaletto Act II).

Act III

Billy tries to call Lucille on the telephone, but she refuses to answer. Flora, Winnie, and Betty tempt him to spend time with them instead ("Telephone Girlie"). Lucille, finding herself alone, realizes that she misses Billy, and nothing else can make her feel better ("Where-Has-My-Hubby-Gone Blues"). The truth begins to emerge as Lucille realizes that Billy cannot be the benefactor of the three girls; he never has any money to spend because Lucille spends it all! Jimmy finally pays off the ladies, and finally the truth comes out: Billy has not been cheating on Lucille, and though Jimmy has been spending his money on the three girls, it is strictly platonic.

Nanette and Pauline, unable to catch a train to New York, return to the cottage, where Tom and Nanette make up; however, it appears that once more, Tom wants to settle down while Nanette wants to enjoy being single. Tom produces a magnificent engagement ring, and Nanette has a change of heart, now insisting that they should get married today ("Waiting for You"). Sue and Lucille decide that in order to ensure Jimmy never again has philandering opportunities, Sue must spend all of Jimmy's money herself. The show ends with a tea dance, where Sue wows Jimmy with a fancy dress and a final dance number ("Take a Little One-Step"; "Finale").

== Musical numbers ==
=== 1925 Original Broadway production ===
==== Act I ====
- "Flappers Are We" – Pauline and Chorus
- "Call of the Sea" – Billy and Chorus
- "Too Many Rings Around Rosie" – Lucille and Chorus
- "Waiting for You" – Nanette and Tom
- "I Want to Be Happy" – Nanette, Jimmy and Chorus
- "No, No, Nanette" – Nanette and Men

==== Act II ====
- "The Deep Blue Sea (Peach on the Beach)" – Nanette and Chorus
- "My Doctor" – Pauline
- "Fight Over Me" – Jimmy, Betty, Winnie and Women
- "Tea for Two" – Nanette, Tom and Chorus
- "You Can Dance with Any Girl" – Lucille, Billy and Chorus
- "I Want to Be Happy" (reprise) – Jimmy, Billy, Flora, Betty and Winnie

==== Act III ====
- "Telephone Girlie" – Billy, Betty, Winnie, Flora and Chorus
- "Where-Has-My-Hubby-Gone Blues" – Lucille and Men
- "Pay Day Pauline" – Pauline, Jimmy and Billy

=== 1971 revised production ===
==== Act I ====
- "Only a Moment Ago" - Sue and Jimmy (Note: This number was cut in the out of town tryouts but included on the cast album.)
- "Too Many Rings Around Rosie" – Lucille, Boys
- "I've Confessed to the Breeze" – Tom, Nanette
- "Call of the Sea" – Billy
- "I Want to Be Happy" (and dance) – Jimmy, Nanette, Boys
- "No, No, Nanette/Finaletto Act I" – Nanette, Tom, Chorus

==== Act II ====
- "Peach on the Beach" (and dance) – Chorus and Nanette
- "The Three Happies" – Flora, Betty, Winnie
- "Tea for Two" (and dance) – Tom, Nanette, Chorus
- "You Can Dance with Any Girl" (and dance) – Lucille, Billy
- "Finaletto Act II" – Company

==== Act III ====
- "Telephone Girlie" – Billy, Flora, Betty, Winnie
- "Where-Has-My-Hubby-Gone Blues" – Lucille, Boys
- "Waiting for You" – Tom, Nanette
- "Take a Little One-Step" – Sue, Company
- "Finale" – Company

== Critical reception ==
The original Broadway production opened to positive reviews; in The New York Times, Herman J. Mankiewicz pronounced it "full of much vigorous merriment and many agreeable tunes," and "a highly meritorious paradigm of its kind." It acknowledged that the plot was slight but praised the score, noting that "I Want to be Happy" and "Tea for Two" were already hit tunes (having premiered in the Chicago production the previous year). Robert C. Benchley in Life magazine admitted "We had a preconceived notion that No, No, Nanette! was a pretty dull show, probably because it had been running so long before it came to New York...No, No, Nanette! is really very amusing." Charles Winninger, in the role of Jimmy Smith, received particular praise for his comedic abilities. The New York Times proclaimed "Winninger gave the greatest performance of his career...it was a more than hardened theatre-goer who was not moved to near hysterics by his every appearance." Benchley stated that "Winninger and Wellington Cross, with that ease and facile kidding which comes to comedians after a long run, are a highly comic pair."

The 1971 revival also received almost uniformly positive reviews from major newspapers, which welcomed its innocent nostalgia. Clive Barnes of the New York Times stated: "For everyone who wishes the world were 50 years younger ... the revival of the 1925 musical No, No, Nanette should provide a delightful, carefree evening. ... This is far closer to a musical of the twenties than anything New York has seen since the twenties, but it is seen through a contemporary sensibility." Douglas Watt, in the New York Daily News, agreed. However, there was some critical disagreement concerning the overall tone of the production. The New York Times thought it "attractively tongue-in-cheek", while John O'Connor of The Wall Street Journal deemed it "a sparkling revival" that was "spiked with jiggers of self-conscious and self-congratulatory camp." T. E. Kalem, in Time magazine, stated: "The show is a copious delight, but it has a sizable temperamental flaw. No strict decision was made as to whether it should be played straight or campy." Jack Kroll of Newsweek considered it a sincere representation of the 1920s, declaring it a "very moving show."

Ruby Keeler's tap-dancing and charm in the revival were widely praised; Richard Watts in the New York Post stated "Ruby Keeler, looking every bit as attractive as in her heyday as a film star, can still do a tap dance or a soft shoe number that is a joy." O'Connor found her charming and warm, writing, "she smartly whisks the delirious audience right back to those good old Busby Berkeley movies." The score was also lauded. Barnes stated "the melodies are light, cheerful and exuberant", and the lyrics "[deserve] a place in any museum of American musical comedy, and yet live wonderfully today." Multiple critics cited Busby Berkeley's supervision as a contributing factor to the show's success; Kroll asked rhetorically "the production has dignity, taste and wit, and how else could it be under the aegis of 75-year-old Busby Berkeley, that authentic genius of the old Hollywood musicals?" Stage veterans Bobby Van and Helen Gallagher received particular praise for their performances. O'Connor stated that "the best performances came from Bobby Van as the suave, debonair dancing lawyer...and the adorable Helen Gallagher as his short-suffering wife." Watt pronounced Van "a hoofer par excellence" and said that Gallagher gave "a most stylish performance."

== Awards and nominations ==
=== 1971 Tony Award nominations ===
- Tony Award for Best Actor in a Musical – Bobby Van
- Tony Award for Best Actress in a Musical – Helen Gallagher (Winner)
- Tony Award for Best Featured Actress in a Musical – Patsy Kelly (Winner)
- Tony Award for Best Costume Design – Production Design by Raoul Pène Du Bois (Winner)
- Tony Award for Best Choreography – Donald Saddler (Winner)
- Tony Award for Best Direction of a Musical – Burt Shevelove

=== Theatre World Award ===
- Theatre World Award – Roger Rathburn (Winner)

=== 1971 Drama Desk Award nominations ===
- Drama Desk Award for Outstanding Book – Book adapted by Burt Shevelove (for the adaptation) (Winner)
- Drama Desk Award for Outstanding Choreography – Donald Saddler (Winner)
- Drama Desk Award for Outstanding Costume Design – Production Design by Raoul Pène Du Bois (Winner)
- Drama Desk Award for Outstanding Performance – Helen Gallagher (Winner)

== See also ==
- No, No, Nanette (1930 film)
- No, No, Nanette (1940 film)
- Yes, Yes, Nanette (1925 parody film)

== Bibliography ==
- Bordman, Gerald (2001). American Musical Theater: A Chronicle. New York: Oxford University Press. ISBN 0-19-513074-X.
- Dunn, Don (1972). The Making of No, No, Nanette. Citadel Press. ISBN 0-8065-0265-7.
