= Vera D. Rubin =

American anthropologist (1911–1985)

- Born: August 6, 1911; Moscow, Russia
- Died: February 7, 1985 (aged 73); Manhattan, New York, U.S.

Academic background
- Education: New York University (BS); Columbia University (PhD)
- Thesis: Fifty Years in Rootville (1952)

Academic work
- Discipline: Anthropology

Vera Dourmashkin Rubin (August 6, 1911 – February 7, 1985) was an American anthropologist and the founder and first director of the Research Institute for the Study of Man. She specialised in the anthropology of the Caribbean.

== Early life and education ==
Rubin was born in Moscow in 1911, and migrated to the United States in 1912. She was daughter of Elias Dourmashkin, editor of the Russian-language newspaper New Russian Word.

Rubin studied French Literature at New York University and graduated in 1930. Rubin went on to study anthropology at Columbia University with Ruth Benedict, Margaret Mead, and Julian Steward, who served as her graduate advisor. She received her PhD from Columbia University in 1952.

== Career ==
In 1955, Rubin founded the Research Institute for the Study of Man (RISM), a nonprofit organization aimed at facilitating the study of anthropology in the Caribbean as well as anthropological fieldwork. Rubin purchased the building for the headquarters at 162 East 78th Street in New York City, which also housed the Library for Caribbean Research (LCR). Rubin served as director of RISM from 1955 until her death in 1985.

In 1975, Rubin and colleague Lambros Comitas published the findings of their study on marijuana smoking in Jamaica for the Center for Studies of Narcotic and Drug Abuse of the National Institute of Mental Health, Ganja in Jamaica: A Medical Anthropological Study of Chronic Marijuana Use. The 1970s marked a period of public interest and discourse surrounding marijuana use in the United States to which their study contributed by reporting that smoking marijuana had no significant adverse effects on users.

Among many other notable studies, Rubin oversaw a partnership between RISM and the Soviet Academy of Sciences to study aging and longevity, focusing on the longevity of a selection of inhabitants of Kentucky and Abkhazia in the Caucasus.

Rubin was president of the Society for Applied Anthropology and director of the American Orthopsychiatric Association. In 2016, the American Orthopsychiatric Association became the Global Alliance for Behavioral Health and Social Justice.

== Personal life ==
Rubin married philanthropist Samuel Rubin. They had two children, Reed, and activist Cora Weiss. They later divorced.

== Honours ==
In 1981, Rubin was awarded an honorary DHL by Brooklyn College. She was president-elect of the Caribbean Studies Association when she died. Shortly before her death in 1985, Rubin received an honorary doctorate of philosophy from the University of the West Indies.

== Bibliography ==
- Fifty years in Rootville : a study in the dynamics of acculturation of an Italian immigrant group in a rurban community (Thesis). Columbia University. 1951. OCLC 213835566.
- Social and cultural pluralism in the Caribbean. 1960. OCLC 869287800.
- A selected bibliography on culture and society in the Caribbean. 1964. OCLC 61769239.
- The non-hispanic Caribbean. 1967. OCLC 61673345.
- We wish to be looked upon : a study of the aspirations of youth in a developing society. 1969. OCLC 781582882.
- Vera, Rubin; Comitas, Lambros (1975). Ganja in Jamaica: The Effects of Marijuana Use. The Hague: Mouton. ISBN 978-9027977311. OCLC 1501286.
- Comparative perspectives on slavery in New World plantation societies. 1993. OCLC 31196621.
