= Three to Make Ready =

1946 musical revue

- Sheet music
- Music: Morgan Lewis
- Lyrics: Nancy Hamilton
- Premiere: Original Broadway Production

Three to Make Ready is an American revue in two acts with a sketches and lyrics by Nancy Hamilton and music by Morgan Lewis. It was produced on Broadway in 1946.

== Production ==
Three to Make Ready premiered on Broadway at the Adelphi Theatre on March 7, 1946, and, after moving to the Broadhurst Theatre and then back to the Adelphi, it closed on December 14, 1946, after 327 performances. It was produced by Stanley Gilkey and Barbara Payne. The sketches and lyrics were by Nancy Hamilton and the music was by Morgan Lewis. The entire production was devised and staged by John Murray Anderson. The scenic design was by Donald Oenslager and the costume design was by Audre.

The cast included Ray Bolger, Harold Lang, Gordon MacRae, Bibi Osterwald, and Arthur Godfrey.

== Songs ==
- “Tell Me the Story”
- “Barnaby Beach”
- “Oh, You’re a Wonderful Person” (cut from the show)
- “The Old Soft Shoe”
- “Lovely Lazy Kind of Day”

== Reception ==
"The production received mixed reviews, but everyone agreed Bolger was the mainstay of the evening. Otherwise, most of the aisle sitters felt the material let him and the cast down. In fact, with just two exceptions, the critics were so generally unhappy with the revue that it’s surprising it lasted for nine months and made a profit."

== Sources ==
- Bordman, Gerald, American Musical Theatre, Oxford University Press, New York, 1978, p. 551.
- Mantle, Burns (ed.) The Best Plays of 1945–1946, Dodd, Mead and Company, New York, 1946, p. 431.
- Dietz, Dan, The Complete Book of 1940s Broadway Musicals, Rowman & Littlefield, New York, 2015, pp. 324–326.
- Stubblebine, Daniel J., Broadway Sheet Music, McFarland & Company, Jefferson, NC 1996, #2326, p. 285.
