= Samuel Rubin (philanthropist) =

Polish and American philanthropist (1901–1978)

- Born: Samuel Rubin; 1901; Białystok, Congress Poland, Russian Empire
- Died: 21 December 1978 (aged 76–77); United States
- Occupations: Humanitarian; entrepreneur
- Known for: Founder of Faberge Perfumes

Samuel Rubin (1901 – 21 December 1978) was a Polish and American humanitarian and entrepreneur.

== Biography ==
Samuel Rubin was born to a Jewish family In 1930, Rubin founded the Spanish Trading Corporation, following up, in 1937, by founding Faberge Perfumes. He retained ownership of the company until 1963 at which point, it having been made a great success, he sold it. Part of the profits went into the Samuel Rubin Foundation, which he had established in 1959.

In 1958, an endowed scholarship was established in his name at Rutgers School of Law—Newark.

In 1972, he took part in a dinner meeting in Paris with Susan George and French political figures and intellectuals who all opposed the Vietnam War. This was at the request of Richard Barnet and Marcus Raskin from the Institute for Policy Studies. They discussed setting up the Transnational Institute (TNI) in Europe.

About this he said: “Since we all agree that the world is suffering from war, from inequities, from the inhuman treatment of perhaps more than two thirds of humanity, let us come together to examine these questions and to see what answers we can collectively produce that may perhaps deliver us, as humanity, as the human race, into a world different from the one we are living in today.”

== Samuel Rubin Foundation ==
Rubin's philanthropy was central to the establishment of progressive organizations; in 1963, the Samuel Rubin Foundation provided the starting capital for the Institute for Policy Studies (IPS), which later became instrumental in founding the Transnational Institute. The Samuel Rubin Foundation has been an important funder of the Transnational Institute for many years. TNI set up the "Samuel Rubin Young Fellowship Programme" in honor of his support.

The foundation also helped established, as part of the "Samuel Rubin Program for Liberty and Equality Through Law", a visiting professorship and an annual lecture on Columbia Law School in 1981. Known as 'The Samuel Rubin Lectures', the professorship and the lecture are to address current issues in human and civil rights law.

== Personal life ==
Rubin was married thrice. His first marriage was to Vera Rubin, an anthropologist; they had two children, Reed and activist Cora Weiss. His second wife was Cyma Rubin. His third wife was Hazel Rubin.
