= Harry Rigby (producer) =

American theatre producer and writer

- Born: 1925; Pittsburgh, Pennsylvania
- Died: January 17, 1985 (aged 59–60); New York City, New York
- Occupations: Theatre producer, writer

Harry Rigby (c. 1925 – January 17, 1985) was an American theatre producer and writer.

Born in Pittsburgh, Pennsylvania, Rigby joined forces with Jule Styne and Alexander H. Cohen to produce the short-lived 1951 Hugh Martin musical Make a Wish as his first Broadway outing. Two years later, he enjoyed greater success when he joined forces with Stanley Gilkey and Michael P. Grace II to produce John Murray Anderson's Almanac, a revue with an eclectic cast that included Harry Belafonte, Polly Bergen, Hermione Gingold, Billy Wolfe, Orson Bean, Kay Medford, Larry Kert, and Tina Louise.

A decade passed before Rigby returned to Broadway, this time as a production associate for The Ballad of the Sad Cafe, Edward Albee's adaptation of the Carson McCullers story. In 1971, he was the driving force behind the hit revival of No, No, Nanette, which lured both Ruby Keeler and Busby Berkeley out of retirement and started the nostalgia craze on Broadway. His acrimonious relationship with fellow producer Cyma Rubin led to a lawsuit that resulted in his credit being reduced to "Revival originally conceived for production by Harry Rigby," but insiders claimed he deserved full credit for the show's success. Undaunted by the experience, he revived the 1919 hit Irene, for which he helped adapt a new book, with Debbie Reynolds two years later.

Rigby died in New York City.

== Additional Broadway credits ==
- Sugar Babies (1979)
- Very Good Eddie (1980)
- I Love My Wife (1977)
- Good News (1974)
- Hallelujah, Baby! (1967)

== Awards and nominations ==
- 1980 Tony Award for Best Book of a Musical (Sugar Babies, nominee)
- 1980 Tony Award for Best Musical (Sugar Babies, nominee)
- 1977 Tony Award for Best Musical (I Love My Wife, nominee)
- 1977 Drama Desk Award for Outstanding Musical (I Love My Wife, nominee)
- 1976 Tony Award for Best Play (Knock Knock, nominee)
- 1968 Tony Award for Best Musical (Hallelujah, Baby!, winner)
- 1968 Tony Award for Best Producer of a Musical (Hallelujah, Baby!, winner)
