= Raoul Pene Du Bois =

American costume designer

Raoul Pène Du Bois
- Born: November 29, 1914; Staten Island, New York City
- Died: January 1, 1985 (aged 70); New York City, New York, US
- Occupations: Costume designer, scenic designer
- Years active: 1934-65

Raoul Pène Du Bois (November 29, 1914 (Note: Some references give the year of birth as 1912) – January 1, 1985) was an American costume designer and scenic designer for the stage and film. He was nominated for two Academy Awards in the category Best Art Direction.

== Career ==
Du Bois was born on Staten Island in New York City, the son of René Pène Du Bois, a banker. He started his career as a costume designer when he was 14, by designing four showgirl costumes for the Ziegfeld Follies. He went on to design the costumes for the Broadway revues Ziegfeld Follies of 1934, his first show and Ziegfeld Follies of 1936.

During the Great Depression, Du Bois worked as an artist for the Index of American Design, contributing sixteen watercolors in the collections of the National Gallery of Art.

Du Bois designed the costumes and/or the scenery for some 48 Broadway shows. Starting in 1934 with the Ziegfeld Follies of 1934, he was the scenic designer for John Murray Anderson's Almanac (1953), costume designer for The Music Man (1957) and his last show as a designer, Reggae in 1980; his designs were used in Jerome Robbins' Broadway in 1989. Among his work was Gypsy (1959) and many other musicals starring Ethel Merman. He worked on Billy Rose's Aquacade for the New York World's Fair (1939–40).

He won the 1971 Tony Award and Drama Desk Award, Best Costume Design for No, No, Nanette and the 1953 Tony Award, Best Scenic Design, for Wonderful Town and was nominated for the Tony Award, Costume Design, for Sugar Babies (1980), Doctor Jazz (1975) and Gypsy (1960), and for scenic design for The Student Gypsy (1964).

== Personal life ==
Children's book writer and illustrator William Pène du Bois was a cousin.

Du Bois died on January 1, 1985, in New York City, New York, from a stroke.

== Selected filmography ==
Du Bois was nominated for two Academy Awards for Best Art Direction:

- Louisiana Purchase (1941)
- Lady in the Dark (1944)
