= Nancy Hamilton =

American dramatist

Nancy Hamilton

Nancy Hamilton (July 27, 1908 – February 18, 1985) was an American actress, playwright, lyricist, director and producer.

== Early life and education ==
Nancy Hamilton was born in Sewickley, Pennsylvania on July 27, 1908, daughter of Charles Lee Hamilton and Margaret Miller Marshall. She was educated at Miss Dickinson's School in Sewickley, at the Sorbonne, and received a B.A. from Smith College in 1930.

At Smith, Hamilton was active in the theater and was president of the school's Dramatic Association her senior year. She caused a bit of a scandal at the college with And So On, a topical revue that she wrote and directed. Billy J. Harbin, Kim Marra and Robert A. Schanke, in their book The Gay & Lesbian Theatrical Legacy: A Biographical Dictionary of Major Figures in American Stage History in the Pre-Stonewall Era, wrote "She [Hamilton] had received special permission from the president of this women's college to hire men to play in the show's orchestra. On opening night the audience was scandalized when it was discovered that Hamilton had incorporated many of the men into onstage scenes."

== Career ==
After a period of amateur acting and producing in Pittsburgh and Montclair, New Jersey, she moved to New York City in 1932 and leased a large apartment with an assortment of women friends. For a short time, she worked for Stern's Department Store and then for RKO Pictures as a spy who checked audience reactions and reported on vaudeville acts.

Hamilton's initial venture into New York theater was as the understudy to Katharine Hepburn in The Warrior's Husband.

She made her Broadway debut in 1934 in New Faces, appearing in the show and writing many of the lyrics. When it closed, she turned to play writing. She collaborated with Rosemary Casey and James Shute on Return Engagement, which was made into the film Fools for Scandal. During the next two years, Hamilton wrote radio scripts for comic actress Beatrice Lillie, Fred Astaire, and Lois Long, and published articles and poems in Stage Magazine and Harper's Bazaar.

She wrote lyrics for three successful Broadway revues (a genre of musical theater that flourished in the 1930s):

- One for The Money (1939) ran for 132 performances.
- Two for the Show (1940) ran for 124 performances
- Three to Make Ready (1946) ran for 323 performances.

These revues launched the careers of Alfred Drake, Keenan Wynn, Gene Kelly, Betty Hutton, Eve Arden, and Ray Bolger.

In her book Stormy Weather: The Music and Lives of a Century of Jazzwomen, Linda Dahl quoted Hamilton as saying "The only way to get a show is to write a show." Dahl added "The revues she wrote, chock-full of talented unknowns who later became stars, pulled in chic New York audiences."

Hamilton is perhaps best known as the lyricist for the popular song "How High the Moon."

In 1945, she spent six months with the American Theater Wing War Players touring the battle areas of France, Italy, Belgium, and Netherlands. In the mid-1950s, Hamilton produced Helen Keller In Her Story (also known as The Unconquered), a documentary on the life of Helen Keller, narrated by Katharine Cornell.

== Personal life ==
Hamilton was the lifelong partner of actress Katharine Cornell.

== Death ==
Hamilton died in New York City, February 18, 1985, after a long illness.

== Awards ==
In 1955, Hamilton won an Academy Award for Best Documentary Feature for Helen Keller in Her Story (1954), becoming the first woman to win that award. The film was restored by the Academy Film Archive in 2006.
