= Edward Royce (disambiguation) =

Edward Royce, better known as Ed Royce (born 1951), is a former member of the US House of Representatives from California

Edward Royce may also refer to:

- Edward Royce (director), English director and choreographer
- E. W. Royce (Edward William Royce, 1841–1926), British actor, singer, and dancer

== See also ==
- Royce (disambiguation)
