= Carl Tucker =

American pianist and composer (1905–1949)

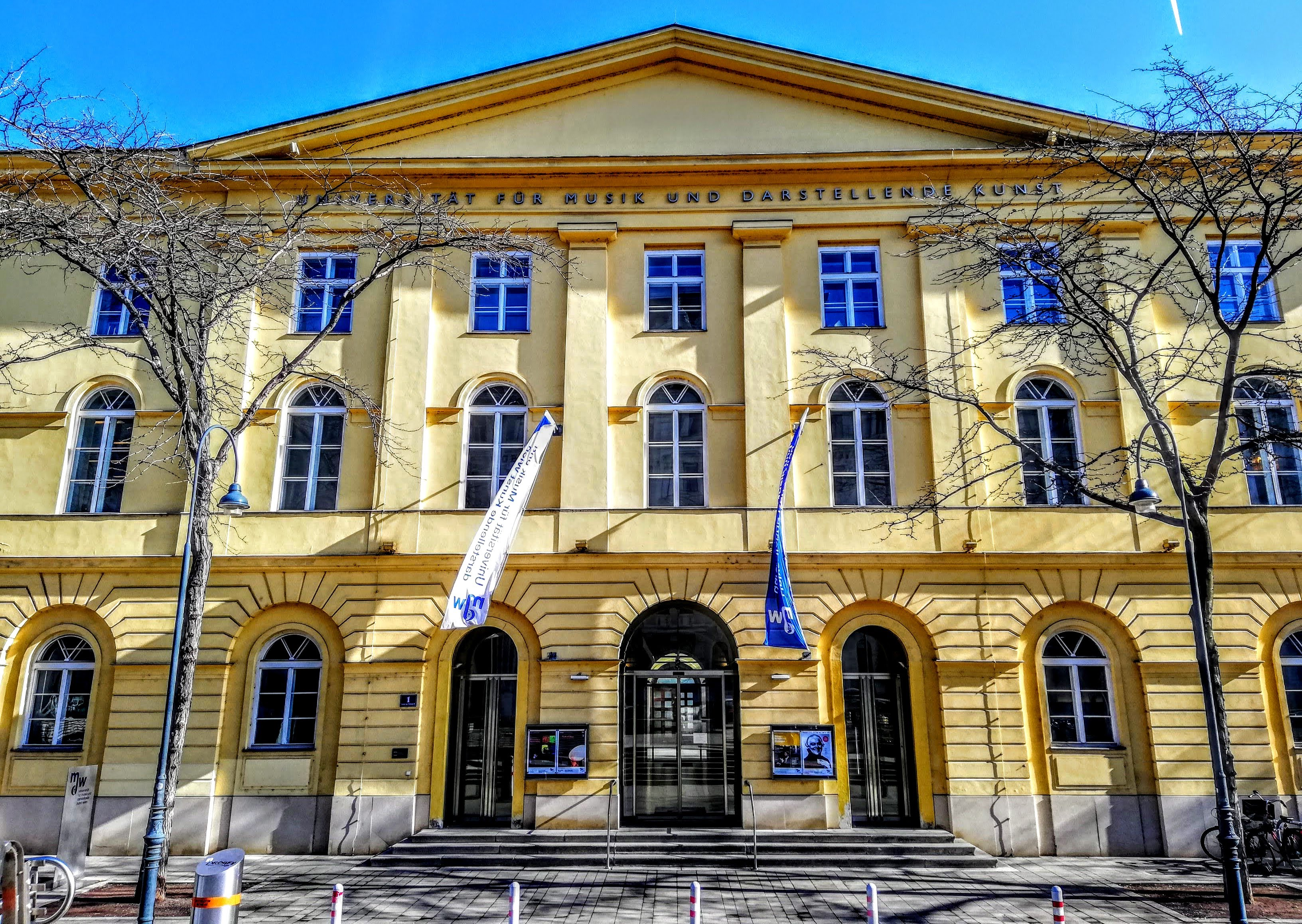
University of Music and Performing Arts Vienna, from which Carl Tucker graduated when it was the Vienna Academy of Music.

Carl James Tucker (1905–1949) was a composer and pianist. In Europe, some theater credits may have had his name as Karl Tucker. he was the author of a variety of musical scores for stage and screen. From the musical comedy stage production of Fritzi, his song A One man women (1935) is documented at the U.S. Library of Congress.

== Early life and education ==
He was born in New York City in 1905. He studied at Badia College in Florence, Italy and graduated from the Vienna Academy of Music, which is now the University of Music and Performing Arts Vienna.

== Career ==
In Europe, he wrote the musical scores of nine films based in Paris and composed the music for three musical comedies. In 1934, he was the composer for the French song Un Bout de Bitume. Examples of the musical comedies are Revue de Paris and Fritzi (1935).

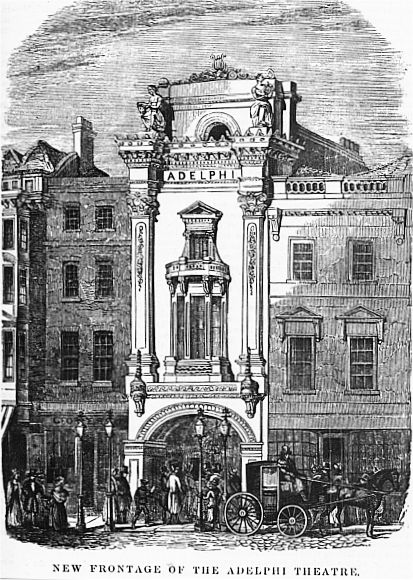
Carl Tucker composed the music for the musical comedy Fritzi at the Adelphi Theatre in London in 1935. (Image from 1840)

Fritzi premiered at the Adelphi Theatre in London, England on December 21, 1935, with lyrics by Arthur Stanley and book by (the play was written by) Sydney Blow and Edward Royce.

Musical Score for Fritzi
Song title	Lyricist	Composer	Year
Fluttering round a flame	Arthur Stanley	Carl Tucker	1936
I love you	Arthur Stanley	Carl Tucker	1935
My Lord, the carriage awaits!	Arthur Stanley	Carl Tucker	1936
A One man women	Arthur Stanley	Carl Tucker	1935

After he had completed the music as a composer for Fritzi, he returned to New York City around 1937.

He wrote the following symphonies:

Montezuma, Elegie, Fantasie Cubana, and Souvenir de Vienna.

He also wrote the Concerto Iridium, as well as the song Haunting Perfume.

In 1947, he wrote the music for symphonic poem My Son, as well as collaborated on a variety of songs with Michael P. Grace ll, as presented in the discography below. Tucker, Grace, and Dale Wood would collaborate in that same year on I Dare to Dream. By 1953, Grace became a Broadway producer, and some of Tucker's music was additional music for Grace's Broadway revue, John Murray Anderson's Almanac. Also in 1953, Tucker collaborated with Grace and Sammy Gallop on a new version of I Dare to Dream.

A great deal of his music was re-released in 1981 in a compilation of various composers titled:

A Parting kiss & 3,774 other titles; musical compositions.

== Discography ==
Song	Year	Music	Lyrics
Un Bout de Bitume	1934	Carl Tucker	Guy Lou
Strolling	1937	Carl Tucker	
Passport to paradise	1938	Carl Tucker	Carl Tucker
Little Boy Blue	1939	Joseph Hibaud Carl Tucker	
Where is My Man?	1942	Carl Tucker	Jean Herbert
All Those Lonely Days	1947	Fred Lincoln	Carl Tucker
Blue Jade	1948		Carl Tucker
Crazy for You	1949	Norman Summerfield	Carl Tucker
Fatima, Lady of Love	1947	Michael Grace Carl Tucker	Michael Grace & Carl Tucker
I'm Tired of Being the Fall Guy	1947	Michael Grace Carl Tucker	Michael Grace Carl Tucker
The Fire in Your Eyes	1947	Michael Grace	Carl Tucker
Santa Mater Eccliasia	1947	Michael Grace & Carl Tucker	Michael Grace & Carl Tucker
I Dare to Dream	1947	Michael Grace Dale Wood Carl Tucker	Michael Grace Dale Wood Carl Tucker
Whispering Guitar	1947		Michael Grace & Carl Tucker
Pourquoi	1947	Michael Grace Dale Wood Carl Tucker	Michael Grace Dale Wood Carl Tucker
My Son	1947	Isabella McKenna Duffield	Carl Tucker
Personality Tune	1947	Michael Grace Carl Tucker	Michael Grace Carl Tucker
I Dare to Dream	1953	Sammy Gallop	Michael Grace & Carl Tucker
