= Alfonso D'Artega =

- Born: June 5, 1907; Silao, Guanajuato, Mexico
- Died: January 20, 1998 (aged 90)
- Occupations: Songwriter, conductor, arranger, and actor

Alfonso D'Artega (June 5, 1907 – January 20, 1998), often known simply as D'Artega, was a songwriter, conductor, arranger and actor. His song "In the Blue of Evening", co-written with Tom Adair, was a number one hit for the Tommy Dorsey Orchestra in 1943.

D'Artega was born in Silao, Guanajuato, Mexico. His family emigrated to the U.S. in 1918. D'Artega studied music and composition at Strassberger's Conservatory in St. Louis, Missouri with Boris Levenson, who was a pupil of Nikolai Rimsky-Korsakov. He became a well-known conductor on stage and on air, and in 1946 initiated the Carnegie Hall "Pops" concerts with members of the New York Philharmonic. In 1947 he played the role of Tchaikovsky in the film Carnegie Hall, conducting the film score as well. He was guest conductor with, among others, the Buffalo Symphony Orchestra, the Miami Symphony Orchestra, the Saint Louis Symphony Orchestra and the NBC Symphony of the Air.

D'Artega wrote over 50 songs. Perhaps his most widely recognized composition in the U.S. is "The NBC Chimes Theme".

One of D'Artega's earlier ventures was D'Artega's All-Girl Orchestra, a twenty-piece show band. The group was formed in New York City in 1942 and appeared in the Broadway play called "Hair Pin Harmony". As a result of that success, the group was booked by the newly formed United Service Organization (USO) Camp Shows. The group traveled coast to coast playing at various military bases, ending in California where they were featured in the Paramount Pictures release "You Can’t Ration Love".

The All-Girl Orchestra continued with the USO and traveled throughout the European and Pacific theaters during World War II. The first tour started in Italy and followed the advance of Allied troops into Germany, France, and Czechoslovakia. The orchestra continued service with the USO traveling to China, Japan, and islands in the Pacific. D'Artega was not only the inspiration, but wrote, arranged, and conducted the group.

In 1953, D'Artega was the conductor for the Buffalo Philharmonic Orchestra in the Summer Pops Concert at Kleinhans Music Hall in Buffalo, New York when they performed the musical composition co-written by Maestro D'Artega and composers Helmy Kresa, and Michael P. Grace II. The composition, titled Space Taxi Selections, was described by the Buffalo Courier-Express as "musical impressionism with a jive tempo". The newspaper also reported how the selections "brought a burst of applause from the audience".

For the 1973 film Fifty Years of Thorns and Roses, a documentary about saint, priest, and mystic Padre Pio of Pietrelcena, Alfonso D'Artega had composed and copyrighted the score.

== Filmography ==
Film Roles
Title	Role	Year
Carnegie Hall	Tschaikowski	1947
You Can't Ration Love	Orchestra Leader	1944
Fifty Years of Thorns and Roses	Soundtrack Composer	1973

=== Screenplay and Artwork for Film Project ===
Created by D'Artega and William D. Van Ness:
Title	Media	Year
The Magic World: A Science Fiction Musical Fantasy	Screenplay	1953
Valedon as seen from the Martian farms	Painting	1953
Mining operations and construction of star ships seen from Phobos	Painting	1953
The Martian war machine and planet disruptor	Painting	1953
The Martian city of Valedon	Painting	1953
The Martian Alphonian monastery	Painting	1953
Ice Caverns, demons of fire and ice loandra	Painting	1953
The grand canal festival on Mars	Painting	1953
The enchanted gardens of Viana	Painting	1953
Club Saturn Interior [night club on planet]	Painting	1953
Club Saturn Exterior	Painting	1953
Ballet of the Meadow Sprites	Painting	1953

== Discography ==
Title	Year	Words	Music
Peace or War? Prayer for Disarmament (The Swan)	1978	Bernard E. Stankiewicz	Alfonso D'Artega
Fifty Years of Thorns and Roses	1972		Alfonso D'Artega
When I lift up my heart in prayer. For 6-part chorus of mixed voices with piano	1955	Charles J. White	Alfonso D'Artega
Fire and Ice Ballet	1954		Alfonso D'Artega
Astral Ballet	1953		Alfonso D'Artega & Michael Grace
My Heart is Gay	1953	William D. Van Ness	Alfonso D'Artega
All This Could Be a Dream	1953	William D. Van Ness	Alfonso D'Artega
Stories in the Stars	1951	Dick Sanford	Alfonso D'Artega
The song that made you mine	1951	William Carroll Loveday	Alfonso D'Artega
Romance in Carnegie Hall (from film Carnegie Hall)	1947	Alfonso D'Artega & Buddy Kaye	Alfonso D'Artega & Buddy Kaye
Valley of Dreams-come-true	1947	Jack Lawrence, Paul Reif, & Alfonso D'Artega	Jack Lawrence, Paul Reif, & Alfonso D'Artega
Dream Concerto	1947	Alfonso D'Artega & Paul Reif	Alfonso D'Artega & Paul Reif
Go Sleepy Sleep	1946	Alfonso D'Artega & Eddie White	Alfonso D'Artega & Eddie White
