= Kresa =

Kresa is a surname. Notable people with the surname include:

- Helmy Kresa (1904–1991), German songwriter, arranger, and orchestrator
- Jakub Kresa (1648–1715), Czech mathematician
- Jessica Kresa (born 1978), American wrestler and actress
- Kent Kresa (born 1938), American businessman
