= Michael P. Grace II =

Producer of Broadway shows

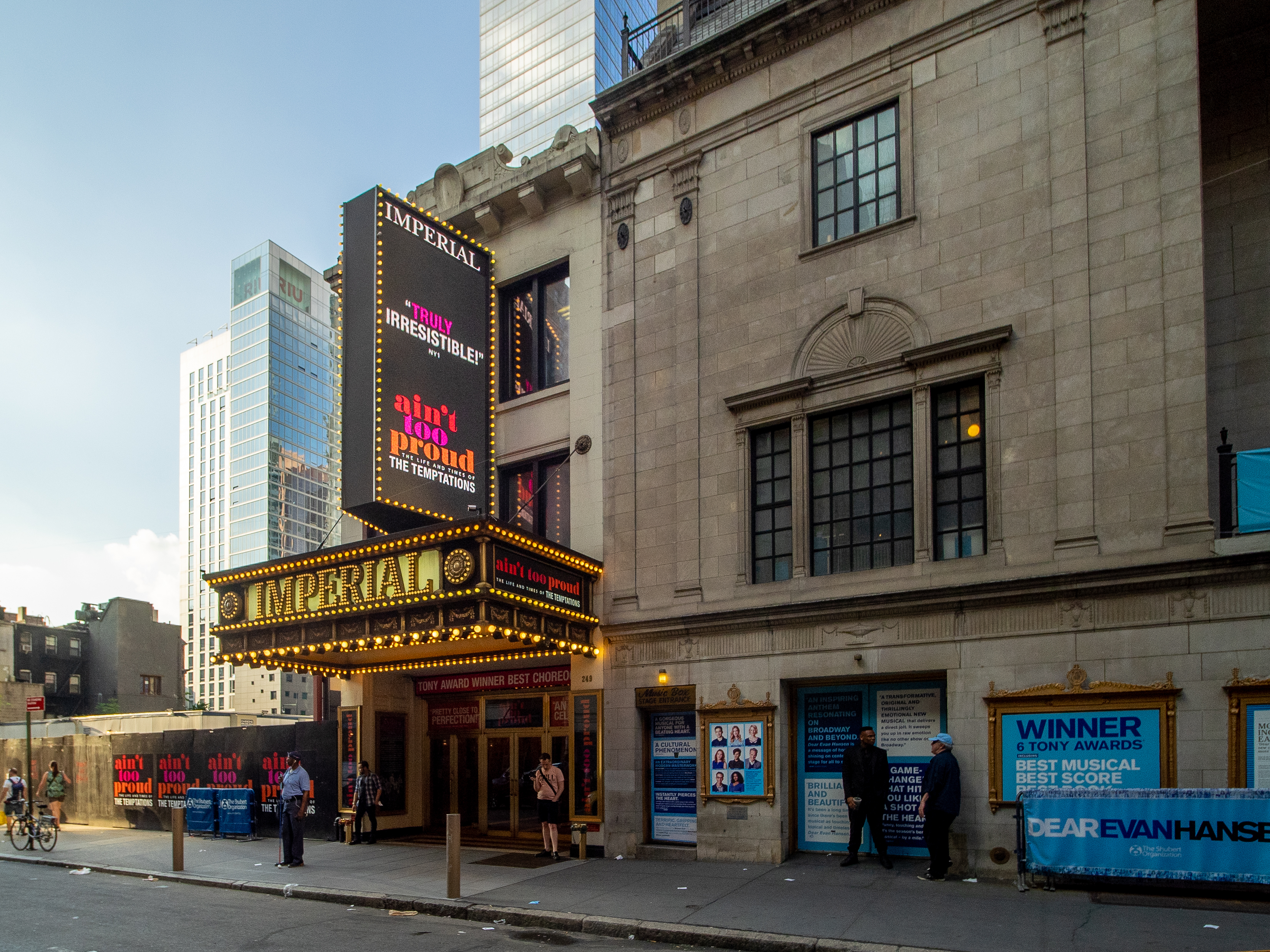
The Imperial Theater. Michael Grace's production of John Murray Anderson's Almanac premiered there in 1953.

Michael Paul Grace ll (August 6, 1917 – April 1, 1995) was the producer of the Broadway shows King of Friday's Men (1951) and John Murray Anderson's Almanac (1953).

Grace was the lyricist and composer of some of the music for the Almanac show and was the author/co-author of a variety of copyrighted music in the recording industry. In the 1950s, he was the assignor for a variety of patented technologies.

He later became an oil and gas producer as well as becoming involved in mining industry applications of oil and gas technology by means of what is called solutions mining. He made philanthropic donations to create several professorships at Notre Dame University.

== Early life ==
Michael P. Grace II was born on August 6, 1917. His father was Joseph P. Grace, the former chairman of W. R. Grace and Company. His siblings were Janet Maureen Grace, Charles M. Grace and J. Peter Grace, who was also the former chairman of W. R. Grace and Company. His grandfather was William Russell Grace, the first Roman Catholic mayor of New York City and the founder of W. R. Grace and Company. His great uncle was an industrialist and chairman of the board of the directors of W. R. Grace, Michael P. Grace.

He attended Harvard University, the University of Notre Dame, and Fordham School of Law.

== Theatre and music career ==
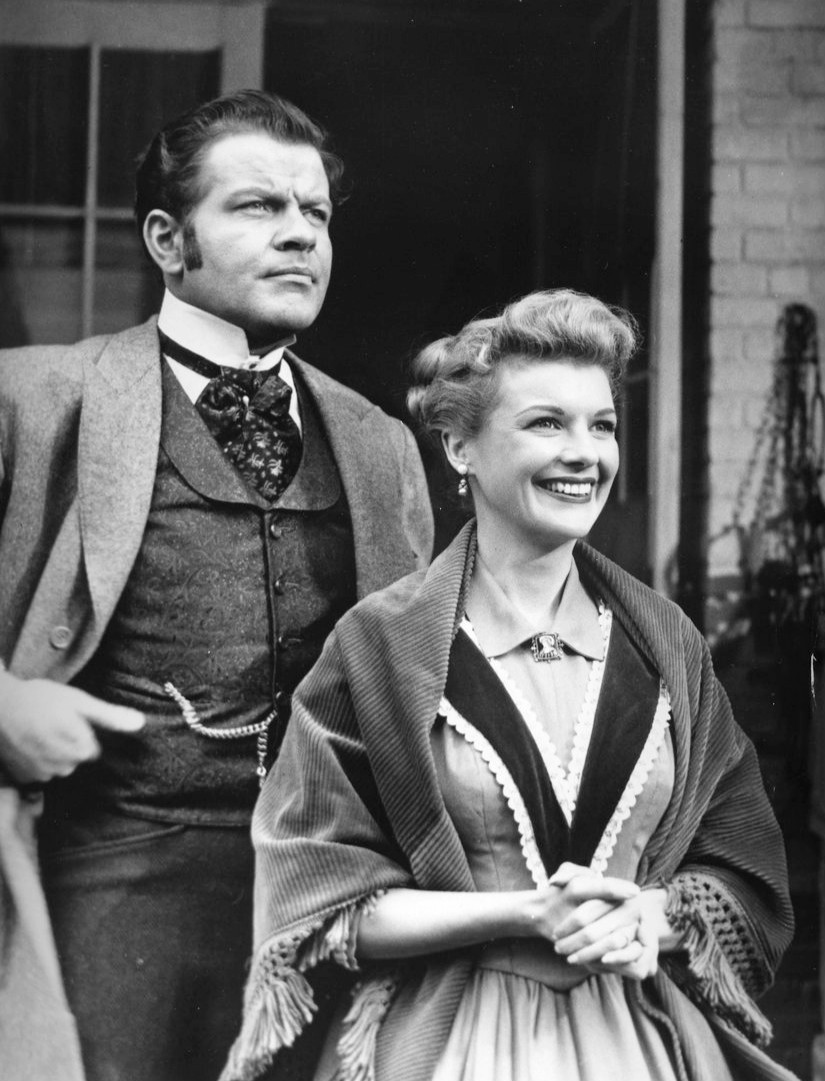
Sean McClory was in Grace's production of King of Friday's Men as Rory Commons. Seen here with Nan Leslie in the television show The Californians (1957-1959)

=== King of Friday's Men ===
He first produced King of Friday's Men in 1951 on Broadway in New York City. It was a comedy set in the 18th century Ireland by Irish playwright Michael Joseph Molloy, and had been directed by David Alexander.

The cast members for the show were:

Sean McClory: Rory Commons

Maggie McNamara: Una Brehony

Walter Macken: Bartley Dowd

Both his grandfather, William R. Grace, and his great uncle, Michael P. Grace, had been born in Ireland.

However, the show closed after two days and four performances.

=== John Murray Anderson's Almanac ===
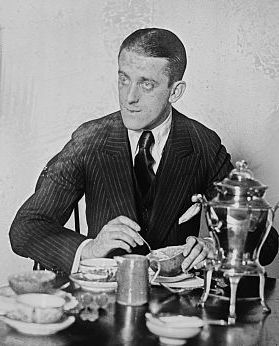
Mike Grace's production of John Murray Anderson's Almanac was conceived and staged by John Murray Anderson, seen here in an image from approximately 1918.

Grace then produced with Stanley Gilky and Harry Rigby the Broadway production of the musical revue John Murray Anderson's Almanac, which opened on December 10, 1953, and continued until June 26, 1954. The show ran for 229 performances.

John Murray Anderson's Almanac was a music and comedy revue and consisted of cast members Billy De Wolfe, Orson Bean, Tina Louise, Hermione Gingold, Harry Belafonte, Polly Bergen, Carleton Carpenter, and Monique van Mooren. The show was conceived and staged by John Murray Anderson, and Henry Sullivan was one of the composers. Both had worked together in John Murray Anderson's Almanac (1929), as well as on part of the soundtrack for The Greatest Show on Earth (1952).

Michael P. Grace II, along with being one of the producers, wrote some of the music and lyrics for the show as well. Richard Adler and Jerry Ross, who wrote most of the music and lyrics, started their careers in Broadway theatre with this show, going on to write songs for The Pajama Game and Damn Yankees over the course of the next two years (1954–1955). Singer and actress Hermione Gingold, originally from England, started her Broadway career as well with this show. She and fellow cast member Billy de Wolfe would go on to win the 1954 Donaldson Award for Male and Female Debut in a Musical. In the same award ceremony, Harry Belafonte won Best Supporting Actor in a Musical.

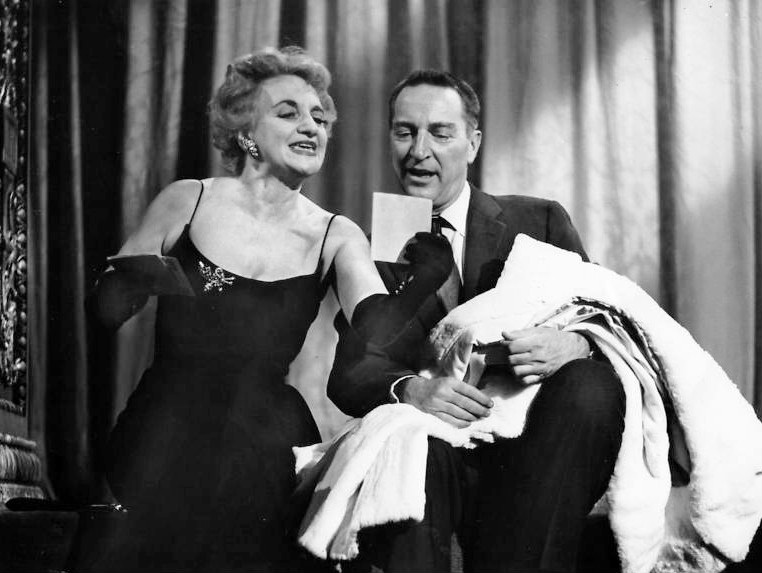
Hermione Gingold, seen here in publicity image for I've Got a Secret, began her career on Broadway as well as in US cinema with Mike Grace's production John Murray Anderson's Almanac.

Examples of music talent management:
Before John Murray Anderson's Almanac (1953)	After the 1953 Show
John Murray Anderson & Henry Sullivan had written part of the soundtrack for The Greatest Show on Earth (1952)	Richard Adler and Jerry Ross, who had written a majority of the music, would go on to write music for The Pajama Game (1954) and Damn Yankees (1955).

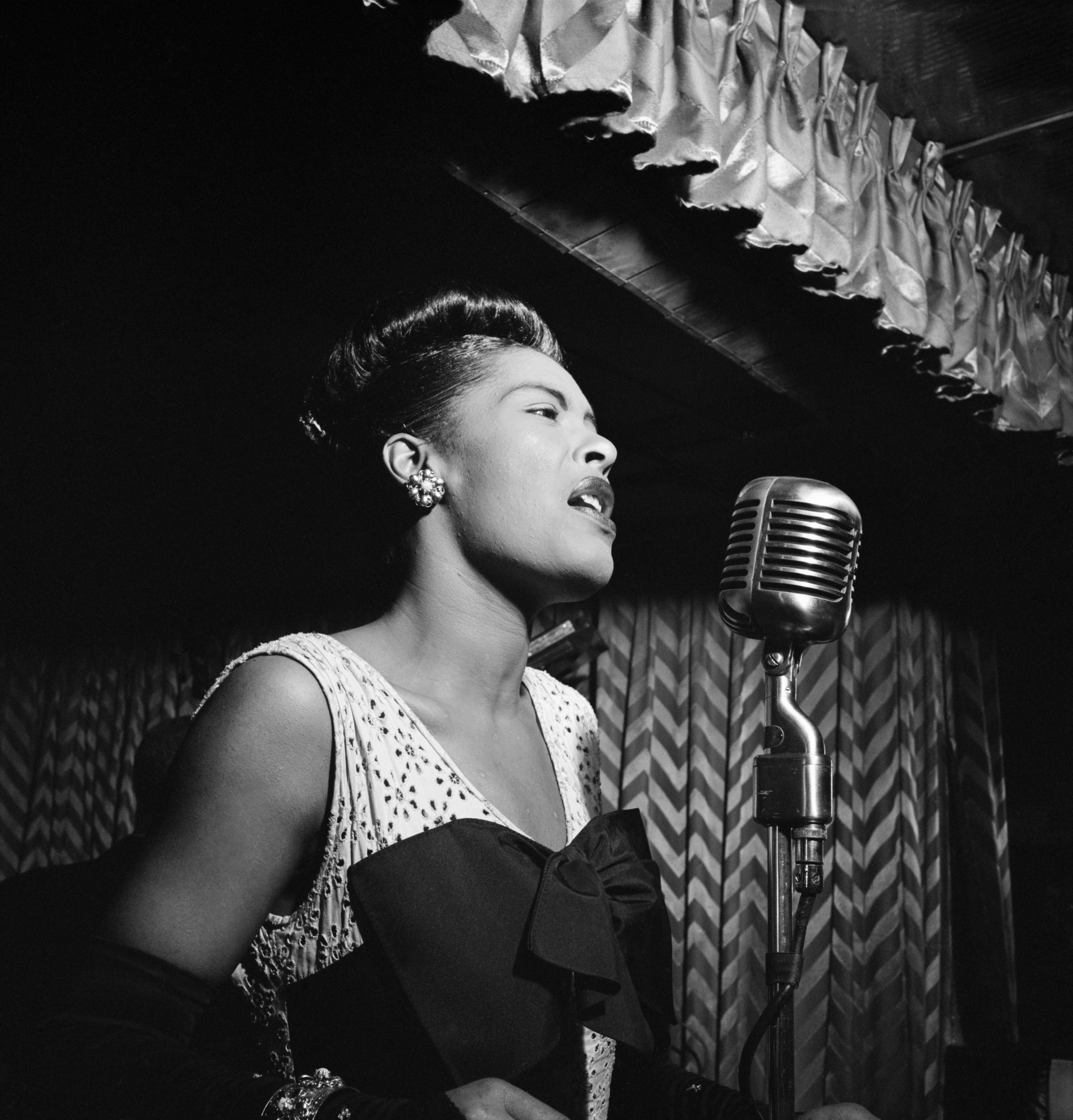
Billie Holiday starred in the Jazz Under the Stars concert. Image from 1947

== Concert productions ==
In 1953, the Buffalo Philharmonic Orchestra, with Alfonso D'Artega as conductor, performed the musical composition co-written by Grace, Helmy Kresa, and Maestro D'Artega, in the Summer Pops Concert at Kleinhans Music Hall in Buffalo, New York. The composition, titled Space Taxi Selections, was described by the Buffalo Courier-Express as "musical impressionism with a jive tempo". The newspaper also reported how the selections "brought a burst of applause from the audience".

In 1957, Grace and Chris F. Anderson presented Jazz Under the Stars at the Wollman Memorial Theatre in New York City's Central Park. It was produced by Grace in association with Monte Kay and Pete Kameron. Kay and Kameron would later go on to create FM Records. The show starred Billie Holiday, the Jerry Mulligan Quartet, Dinah Washington, Buddy Rich, Stan Getz, and Jo Jones. Commentary was provided by Al "Jazzbo" Collins and Sean Shepherd.

== Composer and lyricist ==
Grace, along with having created some of the music and lyrics to his Broadway production, had written a variety of copyrighted songs for the recording industry as well. He wrote/co-wrote the music for Teeny, Weeny Martini (1953) and Cradled in the Arms of Love (1953) with Sammy Gallup and Helmy Kresa. He and John Rox, a fellow lyricist and composer from the Almanac show, wrote Let a Little Time Go By (1954). He also did musical collaborations with Clay Boland and Alfonso D'Artega. (See Discography below).

== Discography ==
Title	Year	Words	Music
Absence Makes the Heart Grow Fonder	1947	Michael Grace, George Tonak, Nola Hooper, & Dale Wood	Michael Grace, George Tonak, Nola Hooper, & Dale Wood
Are You Really in Love	1947	Michael Grace & Charlie Beal	Michael Grace & Charlie Beal
Brooklyn, USA	1947	Michael Grace	Michael Grace
Darling	1947	Michael Grace & Dale Wood	Michael Grace & Dale Wood
Did You Know I Love You	1947	Michael Grace & Dale Wood	Michael Grace & Dale Wood
FATIMA-Lady of Love	1947	Michael Grace & Carl Tucker (Note: Carl Tucker would later go on to write additional music in Grace's production on John Murray Anderson's Almanac.)	Michael Grace & Carl Tucker
GEE, I'd Like to Fall in Love	1947	Michael Grace	Michael Grace
Hangin' 'Round	1947	Michael Grace, George Tonak, & Dale Wood	Michael Grace, George Tonak, & Dale Wood
I Dare to Dream	1947	Michael Grace, George Tonak, & Dale Wood	Michael Grace, George Tonak, & Carl Tucker
GO FOR YOU	1947	Michael Grace & Dale Wood	Michael Grace & Dale Wood
If Love Can Happen	1947	Michael Grace & Dale Wood	Clay Boland
I am Just a Hillbilly Boy	1947	Michael Grace	Michael Grace
I'm Tired of Being the Fall Guy	1947	Michael Grace & Carl Tucker	Michael Grace & Carl Tucker
Isn't Love a Funny Thing	1947	Michael Grace & Clay Boland	Michael Grace & Clay Boland
Personality Tune	1947	Michael Grace & Carl Tucker	Michael Grace & Carl Tucker
Pourquoi	1947	Michael Grace, Carl Tucker, & Dale Wood	Michael Grace, Carl Tucker, & Dale Wood
Roses Sprinkled With Stardust	1947	Michael Grace, William Sullivan, Dale Wood, & Phil Venegas	Mike Grace, William Sullivan, Dale Wood, & Phil Vanegas
Santa Mater Ecclesia	1947	Michael Grace & Carl Tucker	Michael Grace & Carl Tucker
Song of the East	1947	Michael Grace & Dale Wood	Clay Boland
The Yankee Polka	1947	Michael Grace	Michael Grace
Smiling through the Tears	1948	James Cassin & Marin Bierne	Michael Grace & Dale Wood
That's Why My Heart Feels So Gay	1948	Michael Grace & Maureen Grace	Michael Grace & Maureen Grace (his sister)
Pourquoi	1948	Michael Grace & Carl Tucker	Michael Grace & Carl Tucker
Marry Me	1948	Michael Grace	Michael Grace
Calling All Cars Police, secours	1949	English Version: Michael Grace French Version: Michael Emer	Michael Emer
Baby	1949	Michael Grace	Michael Grace
I Never Saw So Much Love as I See in Your Eyes	1952	Jack Scholl	Michael Grace & Helmy Kresa
Miracle of Fatima	1952	Michael Grace	Helmy Kresa
Astral Ballet (Note: Alfonso D'Artega & William D. Van Ness had written a screenplay for a science fiction musical fantasy in 1953.)	1953		Michael Grace & Alfonso D'Artega
Act I, Opening Act(John Murray Anderson's Almanac)	1953		Michael Grace
Are They Really In Love?	1953	Michael Grace	Michael Grace
I'm Not Walking, I'm Dancing	1953	Sammy Gallop	Michael Grace
Midnight in New York	1953	Sammy Gallop	Michael Grace & Helmy Kresa
Christmas Holiday	1953	Michael Grace	Michael Grace
I Dare to Dream	1953	Sammy Gallop	Michael Grace & Carl Tucker
Fall in Love	1953	Michael Grace	Michael Grace
Teeny, Weeny Martini	1953	Sammy Gallop	Michael Grace & Helmy Kresa
Cradled in the Arms of Love	1953	Sammy Gallop	Michael Grace & Helmy Kresa
Be Natural	1953	Michael Grace	Michael Grace
Let a Little Time Go By	1954	John Rox (Note: John Rox and Mike Grace were both composers and lyricists in John Murray Anderson's Almanac)	Michael Grace
Let a Little Time Go By	1978	Michael Grace	

== Assignee of various patented technologies ==
Patents
Device	Inventor	Year	Assignor to
Combination Skirt, Cape, and Blouse	Iris Flores	1953	Michael P. Grace
Perfume Vial	Christy M. Del Mas	1953	Michael P. Grace
Sandwich and Hors D'oeuvers	Christy M. Del Mas	1953	Michael P. Grace
Finger Ring for Holding Perfume	Christy M. Del Mas	1953	Michael P. Grace
Holder for Razors and Blades	Christy M. Del Mas	1953	Michael P. Grace
Harmonica Ring	Christy M. Del Mas	1953	Michael P. Grace
Toothbrush	Christy M. Del Mas	1953	Michael P. Grace
Doll (ornamental design)	Christy M. Del Mas	1954	Michael P. Grace
Combined Whistle and Holder	Christy M. Del Mas	1954	Michael P. Grace
Display Carrying Case	Christy M. Del Mas	1955	Michael P. Grace
Pouring Lid for Cans	Christy M. Del Mas	1955	Michael P. Grace
Dispensing Closure for Collapsible Tubes	Christy M. Del Mas	1956	Michael P. Grace
Articulated Figure Toy	Christy M. Del Mas	1956	Michael P. Grace

== Oil industry ==
In 1965, Grace started a new career as an oil and gas producer. He operated wells mostly in New Mexico and was based in Carlsbad, New Mexico.

Wells produced or with participatory interest by Michael P. Grace in New Mexico

- Humble Grace (1970)
- Tracy B(1974)
- Grace Atlantic #001(1973)
- Airport Grace(1973)

== Philanthropy ==
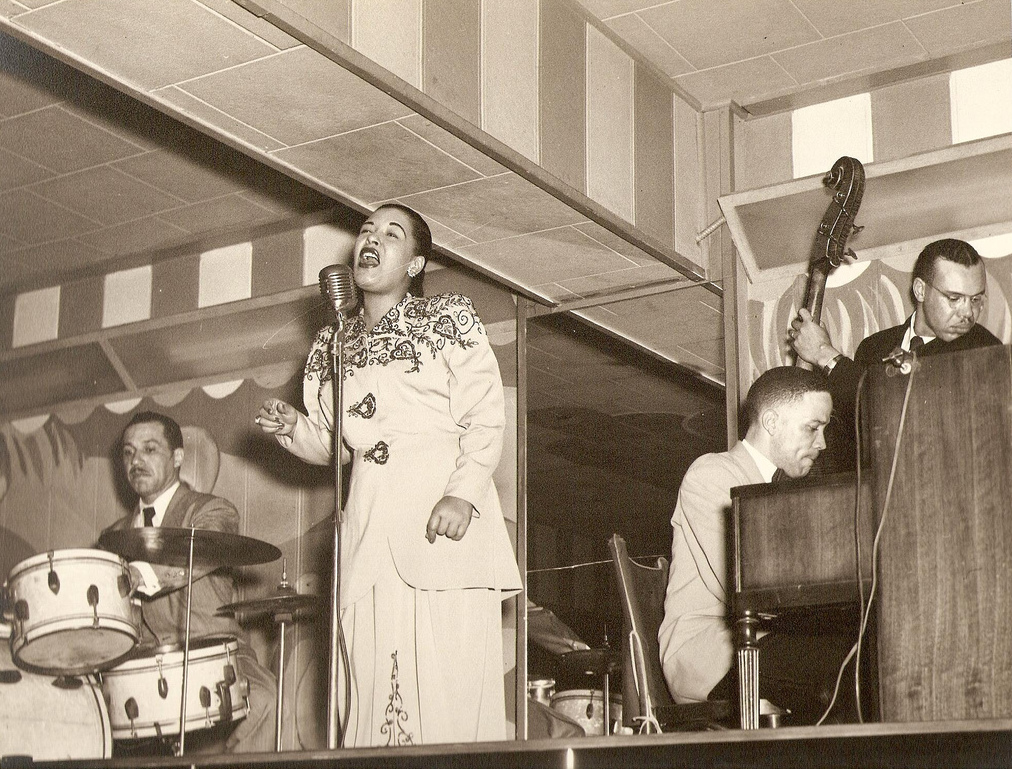
Billie Holiday at the Club Bali (1948).

According to the NPR (National Public Radio) article about Billie Holiday, Billie Full Of Grace: How Billie Holiday Learned to Sing at the House of the Good Shepherd, Grace, a fellow Catholic, stepped up to pay for her funeral in 1959.

He provided the charitable contributions for the Michael P. Grace Chair in Medieval Studies at the University of Notre Dame in the US. The professorship is a part of scholarly work in medieval research. A good example of the professorship's success was its encouragement for the writing of the book Aquinas on Human Action: A Theory of Practice by Ralph McInerny, Michael P. Grace Professor of medieval studies in the department of philosophy at the University of Notre Dame. His charitable contribution also created a professorship and assistant professorship in economics at the university.

== Personal life ==
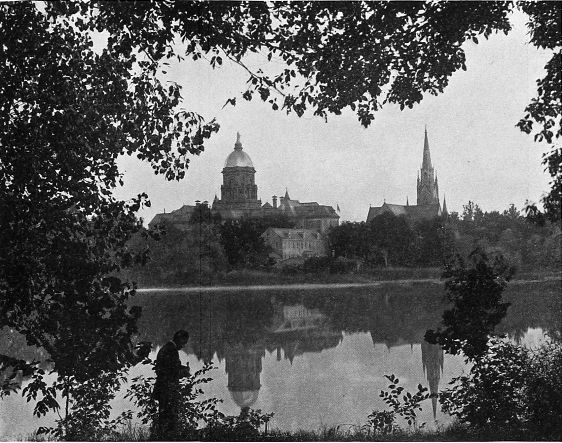
Michael Grace and Corinne Bissette were married at the Sacred Heart Chapel on the University of Notre Dame campus in 1954. Notre Dame was Grace's alma mater.

While his Almanac musical was on stage on Broadway, Michael Grace married Corinne Bissette, an actress and graduate from the Women's College at the University of North Carolina. The wedding was held at Michael Grace's alma mater, the University of Notre Dame at the university's chapel of the Sacred Heart. The wedding took place on April 26, 1954. At the time of the wedding, Grace was president of Fatima Charities in New York City.
