= Kleinhans Music Hall =

Concert venue in Buffalo, New York

- U.S. National Register of Historic Places
- U.S. National Historic Landmark
- U.S. Historic district – Contributing property
- New York State Register of Historic Places
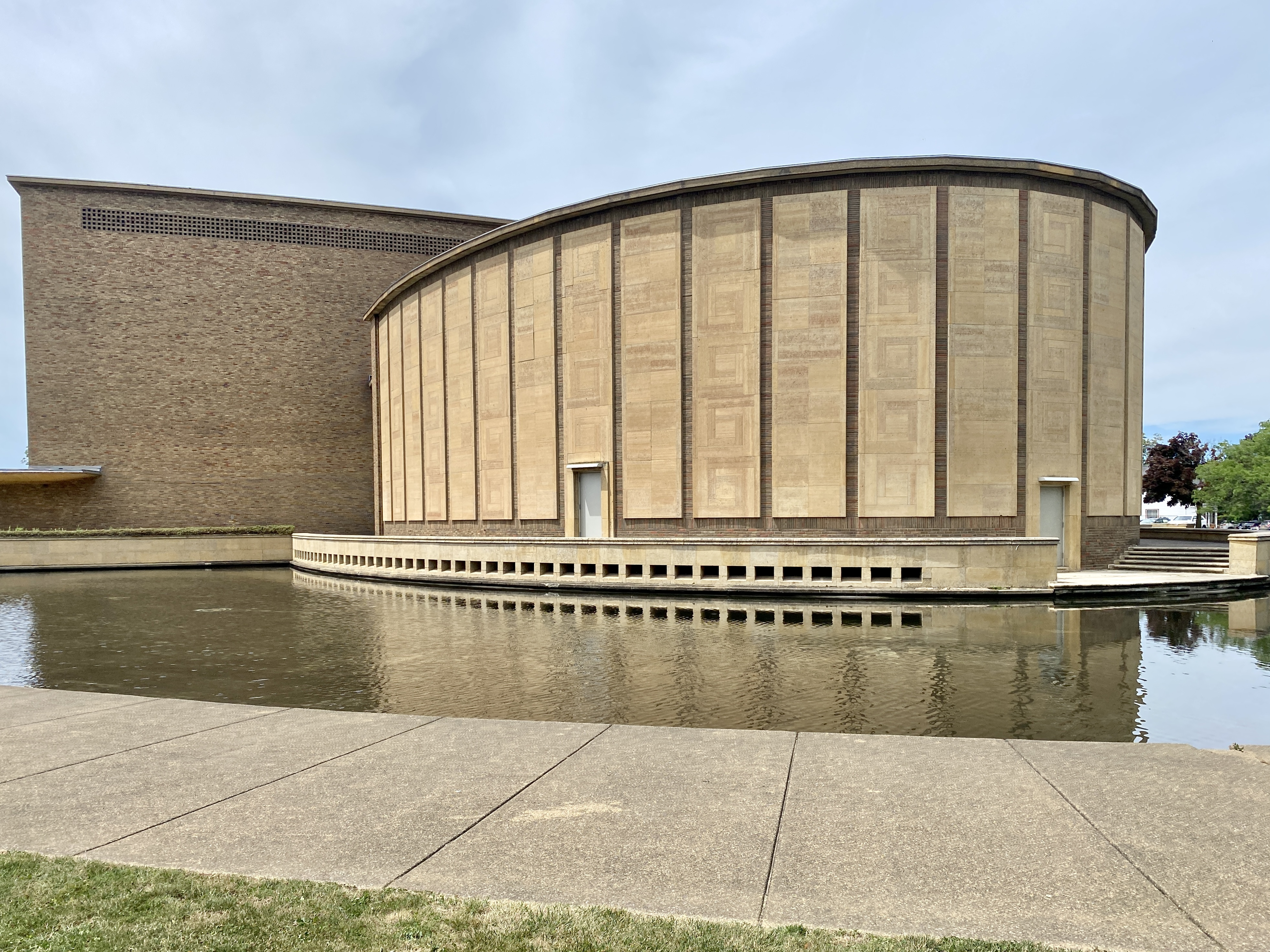
- Interactive map of Kleinhans Music Hall
- Location: Symphony Circle, Buffalo, New York
- Coordinates: 42°54′07″N 78°53′01″W
- Area: 4.2 acres (1.7 ha)
- Built: 1938-40
- Architects: Eero Saarinen; Eliel Saarinen
- Architectural style: International Style
- Part of: Allentown Historic District (ID80002605)
- NRHP reference No.: 89001235
- NYSRHP No.: 02940.000513

Significant dates
- Added to NRHP: June 30, 1989
- Designated NHL: June 30, 1989
- Designated NYSRHP: June 30, 1989

Kleinhans Music Hall is a concert hall located on Symphony Circle in Buffalo, New York, United States. Designed by Eliel Saarinen and his son Eero Saarinen, Kleinhans opened on October 19, 1940, and serves as home to the Buffalo Philharmonic Orchestra, a regular venue for the Buffalo Chamber Music Society. The Saarinens were assisted by local architects F. J. and W. A. Kidd, Stanley McCandless as lighting consultant, and Charles C. Potwin as acoustical adviser. Kleinhans has two performance spaces, as well as additional rooms for rehearsals or events, and is regularly rented out to local groups and private events. It was declared a National Historic Landmark in 1989 for its architecture, 49 years after its completion.

== Performance spaces ==
Kleinhans Music Hall offers two spaces for performances, the main auditorium and the Mary Seaton Room. The main auditorium seats 2,441 (it originally accommodated 2,839 seats but underwent renovations in 2015 reducing the capacity), and showcases the hall's parabolic ceiling and acoustically-informed design. The shape of the hall is such that audience members in the back rows of the balcony will have as clear and instantaneous of an auditory experience as the people in the front rows of the ground level. Charles C. Potwin employed a 1:1.3 ratio in the design of the auditorium to achieve the most ideal acoustic. While the design of the main auditorium is less conducive to reverberation, it aims to create a more intimate experience by drawing the audience in. The austere color palette and simple lines seen in the layout also serve to direct the audience to the music without distraction of ornate decoration.

The Mary Seaton Room is the smaller of the two performance venues, seating up to 700 for a concert, and is well suited for chamber ensembles.

== History ==
Kleinhans Music Hall was named by Edward L. Kleinhans in honor of his wife, Mary Seaton Kleinhans, and his mother, Mary Livingston Kleinhans. The Kleinhans family owned a successful men's clothing company in Buffalo at the turn of the 20th century. Upon their deaths, three months apart in 1934, they left their entire estate of around $1 million to the Community Foundation for Greater Buffalo with the request that the funds go to the development of a music hall.

Upon its completion in 1940, the cost of construction reached $1.5 million, and included funds from President Franklin D. Roosevelt's Public Works Administration in addition to the $1 million from the Kleinhans estate. Kleinhans Music Hall opened on October 12, 1940, with an inaugural concert by the Buffalo Philharmonic Orchestra under Maestro Franco Autori.

In 2015, the seats of the auditorium were updated, and storage rooms were converted into an archive room to serve as an educational feature of the building's philanthropic history and architectural significance. A $21 million renovation of Kleinhans Hall began in 2022.

=== Notable events ===
In 1953, the Buffalo Philharmonic Orchestra, with Alfonso D'Artega as conductor, performed the musical composition co-written by composers Helmy Kresa, Michael P. Grace II, and Maestro D'Artega, in the Summer Pops Concert at Kleinhans in Buffalo, New York. The composition, titled Space Taxi Selections, was described by the Buffalo Courier-Express as "musical impressionism with a jive tempo", eliciting applause.

On September 8, 1964, Robert F. Kennedy, who at the time was the Democratic candidate for the 1964 United States Senate election in New York, gave a speech at Kleinhans in front of 6,000 people.

On November 9, 1967, four months after the city was rocked by the Buffalo riot, Dr. Martin Luther King Jr. gave a speech at Kleinhans titled "The Future of Integration", where he proclaimed, "We are moving toward the day when we will judge a man by his character and ability instead of by the color of his skin."

== See also ==
- List of National Historic Landmarks in New York
- National Register of Historic Places listings in Buffalo, New York
- List of Eero Saarinen works
- Carnegie Hall, another NHL-designated music hall in New York
