= Fritzi (musical) =

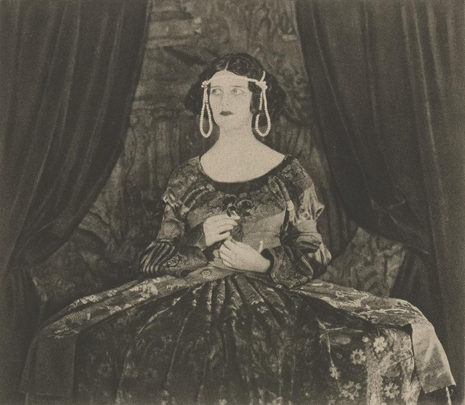
- Rosalinde Fuller, the original Fritzi
- Music: Carl Tucker
- Lyrics: Arthur Stanley
- Book: Sydney Blow and Edward Royce
- Setting: Paris
- Premiere: December 2, 1935
- Productions: 1935 Theatre Royal, Birmingham; 1935 Adelphi Theatre; 1936 Shaftesbury Theatre

Fritzi is a musical comedy written by Sidney Blow and Edward Royce, with lyrics by Arthur Stanley and music by Carl Tucker. The story concerns a Parisian woman who disguises herself as an impoverished Baroness to gain an audition with a famous actor-manager. He falls in love with her and, after some complications, proposes marriage.

After a premiere at the Theatre Royal in Birmingham, England, on 2 December 1935, the piece moved to the Adelphi Theatre in London on 21 December and finally to the Shaftesbury Theatre on 13 January 1936 for a further six weeks.

== Productions ==
It premiered at the Theatre Royal in Birmingham, England, on 2 December 1935 and moved to the Adelphi Theatre in London on 21 December. The show finally moved to the Shaftesbury Theatre on 13 January 1936.

The show ran for 64 performances in London. The production was directed by John Wyse, with choreography by Marianne and was presented by J. W. Pemberton by arrangement with Comus Productions Ltd. The cast included Rosalinde Fuller as Fritzi, Ivan Wilmot as Sorbier and Leslie French as Charles.

Royce, a co-author of the show, was a prominent musical theatre stage director on Broadway in the decades prior to Fritzi and returned to his native England after completing the musical staging for the U.S.-based motion pictures Married in Hollywood (1929) and Words and Music (1929). In England, he provided the musical staging for the film Aunt Sally (1933).

== Plot ==
Fritzi, a stage-struck Parisian gamine who runs a band of boys who earn a living on the streets "finding" trinkets that belong to others. She is enamored of the famous actor and theatrical manager André Sorbier of La Boîte aux Joujoux ("The Toy Box"). With the theatre are Charles, the stage manager, and Paul DuPortal, the financier of the show. Sorbier and a law enforcement officer (the Gendarmie chief) track a missing pie to Fritzi and her boys. She poses as a baroness down on her luck and inveigles herself into an audition for the theatre piece that Sorbier is working on.

At the theater are Desirée, a rival actress, and Paulette LeClair, the leading lady. Outwitting LeClair, Fritzi gets invited to a dinner at Sorbier's apartment. When things start to fall apart, she runs home fearing that her real identity will be discovered. However, Sorbier has fallen in love with her, locates her, and proposes marriage.

== Musical numbers ==
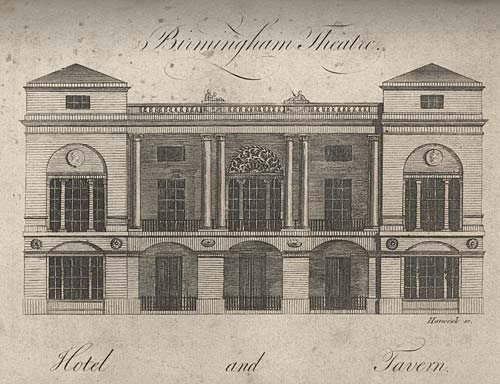
Theatre Royal, Birmingham (1780). Fritzi premiered there in 1935

- Fluttering Round a Flame
- I Love You
- My Lord, the Carriage Awaits!
- A One Man Woman
- It Had to Be You
- And So Let's Go
- Laugh All the Shadows Away
- Come Under My Wing
- Star Gazing

== Original cast ==
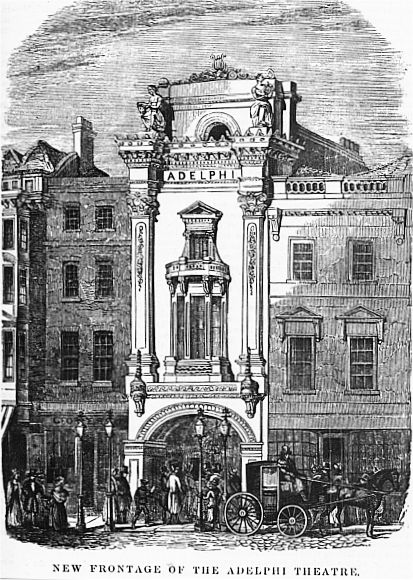
Adelphi Theatre in 1840, where Fritzi played briefly

- Fritzi – Rosalinde Fuller
- Andre Sorbier – Ivan Wilmot
- Paulette LeClaire – Madeleine Seymour
- Gendarmie chief – Alfred Wellesley
- Charles – Leslie French
- Desiree – Betty Frankis
- Paul DuPortal – Bruce Winston
