= Leslie French =

British actor (1904–1999)

- Postcard
- Born: 23 April 1904; Bromley, Kent, England, UK
- Died: 21 January 1999 (aged 94); Ewell, Surrey, England, UK
- Occupations: Stage and screen actor
- Years active: 1914–1994

Leslie Richard French (23 April 1904 – 21 January 1999) was a British actor of stage and screen.

French was primarily a theatre actor, as well as a director, singer and dancer, with a varied career that included the classics, musical revue, pantomime and ballet. He became most associated with the role of Ariel in William Shakespeare's The Tempest, and over the years he essayed many of Shakespeare's spirits and clowns, such as Puck, Feste and Touchstone.

== Early life ==
French was born in Bromley, Kent, in 1904 and was educated at the London School of Choristers. He made his first appearance as a child actor in a 1914 Christmas show at the Little Theatre and left school the same year to join the touring Ben Greet Company as a stagehand and prompter. Hired as an understudy in the West End to Bobby Howes in the musical Mr. Cinders, French played the title role when the play went on regional tour.

== Theatre ==
In 1930, he joined the Old Vic company, where he played Poins in Henry IV, Part I, Eros in Antony and Cleopatra, the Fool in King Lear and the role with which he became most associated with, Ariel in The Tempest. This latter role saw him share the stage with contemporaries John Gielgud (as Prospero) and Ralph Richardson (as Caliban), the first time these two actors appeared on stage together. French was the first male actor to essay the role of Ariel for many years and did so in nothing more than a small loincloth, helping to make this version something of a talking point at the time. French and Gielgud were also the inspiration for Eric Gill's carving of Prospero and Ariel above the entrance to the then new Broadcasting House in Portland Place.

French continued his stage career at the Old Vic and later the Open Air Theatre in Regent's Park, specialising in Shakespeare's spirits and clowns, such as Puck, Feste, Touchstone and of course Ariel, roles greatly enhanced by his singing and dancing ability. He also directed several plays including successful stagings of The Taming of the Shrew and As You Like It. French also appeared in musicals, such as Fritzi (1935), revue, pantomime and ballet.

=== Maynardville open-air theatre ===
In 1955 he helped to establish the new Shakespearean seasons at the Maynardville Open-Air Theatre in Cape Town, South Africa. This theatre, which had opened a short while before, on 1 December 1950, had multi-racial casts performing to multi-racial audiences. In 1963 he was awarded the key to the city for his work with the theatre.

== Film and television ==
French made the occasional foray into film, appearing in two Luchino Visconti films, The Leopard (1963) and Death in Venice (1971), as well as many British television programmes. These included Dixon of Dock Green, Armchair Theatre, Z-Cars, The Avengers (the episode You Have Just Been Murdered), Jason King and The Singing Detective. His role as Mr. Woodhouse in a BBC serial of Jane Austen's Emma (1960) is considered one of his most memorable screen performances. French was also considered for the role of the First Doctor in the science fiction series Doctor Who; William Hartnell was cast. He finally appeared in the programme in its 1988 serial, Silver Nemesis, playing the Mathematician.

=== Selected filmography ===
- Radio Pirates (1935) – Leslie
- Peg of Old Drury (1935) – Alexander Pope
- This England (1941) – Johnny
- The Wallet (1952)
- Orders to Kill (1958) – Marcel Lafitte
- The Scapegoat (1959) – Lacoste
- The Singer Not the Song (1961) – Father Gomez
- The Leopard (1963) – Cavalier Chevally
- The Rescue Squad (1963) – Mr. Manse
- More Than a Miracle (1967) – Brother Giuseppe de Coopertino
- Death in Venice (1971) – Travel Agent
- Lady Killers (1980) – Justice Denman
- Invitation to the Wedding (1983) – Hobbs
- The Living Daylights (1987) – Lavatory Attendant
- Young Toscanini (1987) – Comparsa (uncredited)
