= Apple Blossoms =

1919 Broadway musical

Apple Blossoms is a 1919 operetta with music by Fritz Kreisler and Victor Jacobi; and a libretto by William LeBaron. The show is an adaptation of the book Un Marriage sous Louis XV by Alexander Dumas.

Apple Blossoms opened at the Globe Theatre on Broadway on October 7, 1919, and closed on April 24, 1920, after 256 performances. The original production was staged by Fred G. Latham and Edward Royce.

== Synopsis ==
Setting: Clifton-on-Hudson and New York City

Nancy Dodge, a student at an all-girls school, is in love with Dickie Stewart, the brother of her classmate, Polly. However, Nancy's uncle, George Winthrop Gordon, wants her to marry Phillip Campbell. Although Phillip is actually in love with a widow, Anne Merton, he and Nancy agree to marry. However, the two also agree that their marriage is one of convenience, and they can pursue other people. During a masked ball, Nancy and Phillip realize that they do actually love each other, and Dickie leaves with Anne.

== Cast ==
	1919 Broadway
Julie	Rena Parker
Polly	Juanita Fletcher
Molly	Adele Astaire
Johnny	Fred Astaire
Nancy	Wilda Bennet
Lucy Fielding	Pauline Hall
Anabel Mason	Hildah Reeder
Richard (Dickie) Stewart	Percival Knight
Mail Carrier	Frank Snyder
Chauffeur	George Fordyce
George Winthrop Gordon	H. Brockbank
Harvey	Roy Atwell
Phillip Campbell	John Charles Thomas
Mrs. Anne Merton	Florence Shirley
