= Peggy (musical) =

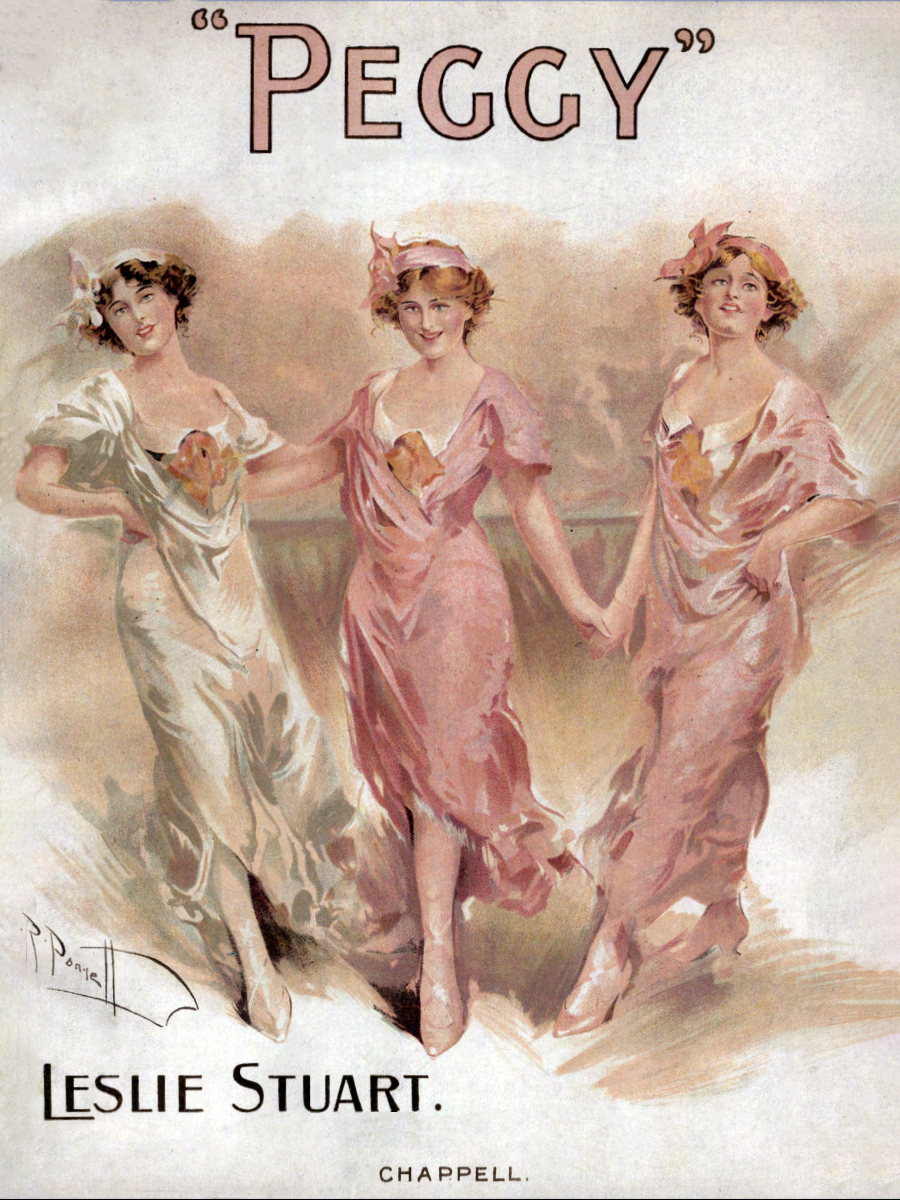
Front cover illustration from the musical "Peggy" by Robert Pannell, published by Chappell & Co., London, 1911.

Peggy is a musical comedy in two acts, written by British composer Leslie Stuart, with a book by George Grossmith, Jr. and lyrics by C. H. Bovill, based on Xanroff and Guérin's L'Amorçage. It opened at the Gaiety Theatre under the management of George Edwardes, on 4 March 1911 and ran for 270 performances, starring Grossmith, Edmund Payne, Phyllis Dare and Gabrielle Ray in the title role. Ray left the production early in the run, to be replaced by Gladys Guy. When the popularity of the show began to wane, Edwardes had a new role written for Connie Ediss. The show also had a run in New York.

Songs included "Friville", "The Lass with the Lasso", "Three Little Pebbles" and "Ladies, Beware! (When the Lights are low)". Critics praised Stuart's score but observed that the plot of the piece was thin. But they concluded that this did not matter:

[T]here is "Teddy" Payne with his quaint twists of the eye and his delightful lisp. ... Then there is that superlatively dressed young man, Mr. George Grossmith, jun. ... Are we interested in what he does? Of course not. We are interested in his airy, flamboyant manner of doing it. As for those sexy ladies, Miss Phyllis Dare and Miss Olive May, que voulez vous? We know they are going to fall in love with one or the other of the cast. ... They will sing sweetly and dance deliciously, and we shall gaze on their beautiful faces and listen to their enticing voices and ... there are the beauteous houris. ... What charms they possess and what charms they reveal! … What care for a plot when such visions of delight are about? Plot, indeed – be hanged...! And that is just what Mr. George Grossmith, jnr. said to himself when he was concocting the mélange which Mr. George Edwardes, with the assistance of Mr. Edward Royce, scene painters, costumiers, wig makers, and so forth, has served up in such a magnificent and costly manner at the Gaiety. 'Do you think I wanted to trouble about such commonplace things as a plot? ... I was well assured that my ear would be saluted with tuneful melodies and bright songs, for is not Mr. Leslie Stuart the composer?

== Synopsis ==
Phyllis Dare in Peggy

In a luxurious lounge at the New Hotel, London, the lovely Peggy Barrison heads a dainty band of manicurists, and Albert Umbles, a charming hairdresser, is an immense favourite with the ladies. Peggy finds herself hopelessly smitten with him, and he is also in love with her. They are engaged to be married, much to the consternation of the frequenters of the hotel in general and of the Hon. Mr. James Bendoyle, M.P., M.F.H., in particular. Bendoyle is the richest of all of Peggy's numerous admirers. Determined to marry her himself, he hatches a plot to obtain her affections. Learning that Umbles has a rich Uncle in South America who has not been heard of for some years, but whose return is confidently expected, he bribes a former friend named Auberon Blow, who, having fallen on hard times is employed as a hawker, to impersonate "Uncle Monty" and to excite Peggy with a life of luxury to such an extent, that the supply cut off, she will turn to anyone who can afford her the means of continuing it.

This seems to be working splendidly, but the real uncle and his daughter arrive and realize immediately that there is an imposter. Bendoyle invites everyone to Friville. Here everything is resolved: the gallant hairdresser forsakes Peggy for vaudeville artist Polly; Bendoyle marries Doris, the daughter of the real uncle, while "Uncle Monty" (actually Blow) and Peggy have become so fond of each other that they decide never to part.

== Roles and original cast ==
- Auberon Blow – George Grossmith, Jr.
- Hon. James Bendoyle, M.P. – Robert Hale
- Montagu Bartle of Buenos Ayres – Herbert Jarman
- Aristide Picot – Arthur Atherton
- 'Phonso – Ernest Mahar
- Marquis of Didsbury – Guy Struthers
- Emil – Harry B. Burcher
- Albert Umbles – Edmund Payne
- Polly Polino – Gabrielle Ray (replaced by Gladys Guy when Ray left the production to marry)
- Doris Bartle – Olive May
- Peggy Barrison – Phyllis Dare
- Diamond – Enid Leslie
- Lady Florence Alister – Nancy Moore
- Mrs. Ware-Wills – Ruby Kennedy
- Ethel - Blanche Stocker
- Miss Vooch – Madge Melbourne
- Manicurists, Harem Girls, etc.
