= Sammy Gallop =

American lyricist

Sammy Gallop (March 16, 1915 – February 24, 1971) was an American lyricist, known for his big band and swing songs of the 1940s and 1950s.

== Biography ==
Gallop was born in Duluth, Minnesota. He originally worked as a surveyor and draftsman. On February 24, 1971, Gallop died by suicide in Encino, California. Some records mentioned his name as Gallup.

== Works ==
Works With >1 Composer Composing the Music
| Title | Words | Music |
|---|---|---|
| Boogie Woogie Maxixe | Sammy Gallup, Gil Rodin, & Bob Crosby | Sammy Gallup, Gil Rodin, & Bob Crosby |
| Cry My Heart | Sammy Gallop, Jimmy Saunders, & Ricky Vallo | Sammy Gallop, Jimmy Saunders, & Ricky Vallo |
| Cradled in the Arms of Love | Sammy Gallop | Michael P. Grace & Helmy Kresa |
| I Dare to Dream | Sammy Gallop | Michael P. Grace & Carl Tucker |
| No Good Man | Sammy Gallop | Dan Fisher and Irene Higginbotham |
| Elmer's Tune | Sammy Gallop | Elmer Albrecht and Dick Jurgens |
| The Way I Feel About You | Sammy Gallop | Doc Severinsen and Tommy Newsom |
| You're Gonna Hate Your Self in the Mornin | Sammy Gallop | Larry Stock and Ira Schuster |
| I've Love you Before | Sammy Gallop & Patience Young | Peggy Stuart |
| Do a Little Waltz With Yourself | Sammy Gallop, Dick Sanford, & Sammy Mysels | Sammy Gallop, Dick Sanford, & Sammy Mysels |

- "Boogie Woogie Maxixe" (words and music by Sammy Gallop, Gil Rodin, & Bob Crosby)
- "Cry My Heart" (words and music by Sammy Gallop, Jimmy Saunders, & Ricky Vallo)
- "Cradled in the Arms of Love" (music by Michael P. Grace and Helmy Kresa)
- "Glory Be & Hallelujah" (music by Jerry Livingston)
- "Blossom on the Bough" (music by Carl Sigman)
- "I Dare to Dream" (music by Michael Grace & Carl Tucker)
- "I'm Not Walking, I'm Dancing" (music by Michael Grace)
- "Caribbean Clipper" (music by Jerry Gray)
- "Count Every Star" (music by Bruno Coquatrix)
- "The Clock in the Tower" (music by Guy Wood)
- "Elmer's Tune" (music by Elmer Albrecht and Dick Jurgens)
- "Forgive My Heart" (music by Chester Conn)
- "Half As Lovely Twice As True" (music by Lew Spence)
- "Holiday for Strings" (music by David Rose)
- "Maybe You'll Be There" (music by Rube Bloom)
- "My Lady Loves to Dance" (music by Milton DeLugg)
- "No Good Man" (music by Dan Fisher and Irene Higginbotham)
- "The Sentimental Touch" (music by Albert Van Dam)
- "Shoo Fly Pie and Apple Pan Dowdy" (music by Guy Wood)
- "Somewhere along the Way" (music by Kurt Adams)
- "There Must Be a Way" (music by David Saxon)
- "Uninvited Dream" (music by Burt Bacharach)
- "Wake the Town and Tell the People" (music by Jerry Livingston)
- "Way I Feel About You" (music by Doc Severinsen and Tommy Newsom)
- "You're Gonna Hate Yourself in the Mornin'" (music by Larry Stock and Ira Schuster)
