= Charlie Beal =

American jazz pianist (1908–1991)

Charles Herbert Beal (September 14, 1908 – July 31, 1991) was an American jazz pianist.

Beal was born in Redlands, California. He played freelance in the Los Angeles area before joining Les Hite's band in 1930. He moved to Chicago in 1932, playing solo at the Grand Terrace in addition to working with Earl Hines, Carroll Dickerson, Jimmie Noone, Erskine Tate, and Frankie Jaxon. From 1933 to 1934 Beal accompanied Louis Armstrong, recording with him extensively. After leaving Armstrong, Beal worked with Noble Sissle, then moved to New York City late in 1934. There he did solo residencies and played with Adrian Rollini, Buster Bailey, and Eddie South, before relocating to Canada for a time. After returning to the U.S. he served in the Army during World War II, and upon his discharge took up residency in Los Angeles again. There he played solo at the Jococo Room, but found his way back into Armstrong's ensemble in 1946. From 1948 to 1956 he worked in Europe, and upon his return spent three years in the house trio at Embers in New York City. Later in his life he returned to southern California, playing at the Racquet Club in Palm Springs, California. He died in San Diego.

== Discography ==
Songs Composed by Beal
Title	Year	Composers
Telesec	1946	Charles H. Beal
All the World in New	1946	Charles H. Beals and Herb Jeffries
Are You Really in Love	1950	Charles H. Beals and Michael P. Grace II
