= Oh, Lady! Lady!! =

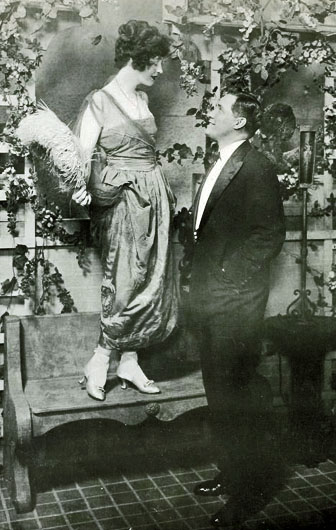
- Segal and Randall as Mollie and Bill
- Music: Jerome Kern
- Lyrics: P.G. Wodehouse
- Book: Guy Bolton and P.G. Wodehouse
- Productions: 1918 Broadway

Oh, Lady! Lady!! is a musical with music by Jerome Kern, a book by Guy Bolton and P. G. Wodehouse and lyrics by Wodehouse. It was written for the Princess Theatre on Broadway, where it played in 1918 and ran for 219 performances. The story concerns an engaged young man, Bill, whose ex-fiancée arrives unexpectedly on his wedding day. Bill works to convince his old flame that he was not worthy to marry her, but his clumsy efforts do not make him look good to his new fiancée, whose mother already dislikes Bill. A couple of crooks cause further complications.

The original cast starred Vivienne Segal as Mollie Farringdon. The songs include "Not Yet", "When Ships Come Home", "Greenwich Village", the innovative "Moon Song" and "Our Little Nest". The song "Bill", later famous in Show Boat, was cut before the production opened.

== Background ==
The Princess Theatre was a small Broadway house that seated only 299 people. Theatre agent Elisabeth Marbury urged composer Jerome Kern and librettist Guy Bolton, later joined by British humorist and lyricist/playwright P. G. Wodehouse to write a series of musicals tailored to the theatre, with an intimate style and modest budgets. These "Princess Theatre shows" had coherent, clever plots that provided an alternative to the other musical entertainments that then dominated Broadway: star-studded revues and extravaganzas of Florenz Ziegfeld, thinly-plotted, musical comedies, Gilbert and Sullivan revivals and gaudy adaptations of European operettas.

After a modest success, Nobody's Home (1915), Kern and Bolton had a hit with an original musical called Very Good Eddie (1915). Wodehouse joined the team for another hit, Oh, Boy! (1917), which ran for an extraordinary 463 performances. Two more of their shows written for the theatre ran at other theatres during the long runs of Very Good Eddie and Oh, Boy! The shows featured modern American settings and simple scene changes (one set for each act) to suit the small theatre, eschewing operetta traditions of foreign locales and elaborate scenery. The collaboration was much praised. According to Gerald Bordman, writing in The Musical Times,

These shows built and polished the mold from which almost all later major musical comedies evolved. As they all dealt with the smart set they were stylishly mounted .... The characters and situations were, within the limitations of musical comedy license, believable and the humor came from the situations or the nature of the characters. Kern's exquisitely flowing melodies were employed to further the action or develop characterization. ... P. G. Wodehouse, the most observant, literate, and witty lyricist of his day, and the team of Bolton, Wodehouse, and Kern had an influence which can be felt to this day.

== Productions ==
Oh, Lady! Lady!! debuted in Albany, New York on January 7, 1918 at Bleecker Hall. After some revisions and touring, the musical opened at the Princess Theatre on February 1, 1918, to uniformly rave reviews and ran for 219 performances, finishing its run at the Casino Theatre. The production was produced by William Elliott and F. Ray Comstock and directed by Robert Milton and Edward Royce, who also choreographed it. It starred Vivienne Segal as Mollie Farringdon, one of her earliest roles, and Carl Randall as Bill Finch. Florence Shirley played Fanny Welch, a jewel thief. Early drafts of the show were called Say When, but the title of the show was eventually taken from a minstrel show catch-phrase.

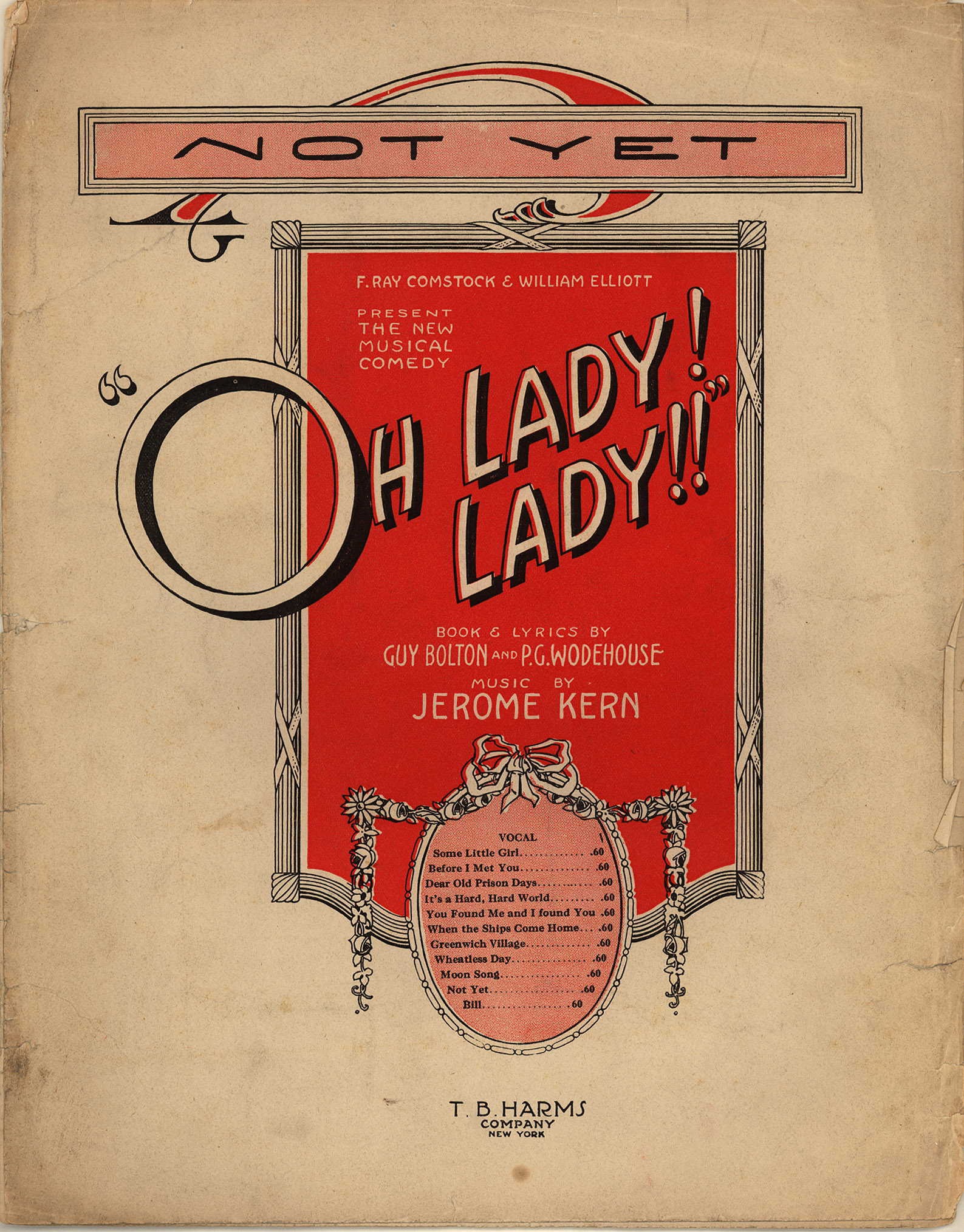
Sheet music to "Not Yet", from Oh, Lady! Lady!!

The New York Times previewed the show, calling the plot "measurably novel" with bright lines and lyrics, said the music demonstrated "easy gaity" and praised the show's casting and "artistic excellence". The paper called Segal "wonderfully pleasing" and praised both her and Randall's dancing. Its review began: "Once more Comstock, Elliott, and Gest have shown their allegiance to the policy of supplying popular entertainment which is mitigated by all available talent and good taste". In April 1918, Dorothy Parker wrote in Vanity Fair:

Well, Wodehouse and Bolton and Kern have done it again. Every time these three are gathered together, the Princess Theatre is sold out for months in advance. ... You can get a seat at the Princess, somewhere along around the middle of August, for just about the price of one on the stock exchange. ... Wodehouse and Bolton and Kern are my favorite indoor sport, anyway. I like the way they go about a musical comedy. ... I like the way the action slides casually into the songs. ... I like the deft rhyming of the song that is always sung in the last act, by two comedians and one comedienne. And oh, how do I like Jerome Kern's music – those nice, soft, polite little tunes that always make me wish I'd been a better girl. And all these things are even more so in Oh, Lady! Lady!! than they were in Oh, Boy!

One of Segal's songs, Bill, was cut just two days before the show opened. In the song, Mollie reflects on her love for a young man that her mother dislikes. Kern used the song nine years later, with the music slightly revised and the lyrics correspondingly revised by Oscar Hammerstein II, in Show Boat (1927). together in 1924, Sitting Pretty, at the Fulton Theatre.

Recent productions include one by the Musicals Tonight troupe in New York City in 2006 and one by 42nd Street Moon in San Francisco in 2007.

== Plot summary ==
Setting: Hempstead, Long Island and Waverly Mews

Act I

Debonair but penniless Willoughby "Bill" Finch is set to marry Long Island society gal Molly Farringdon, although he has not charmed his formidable future mother-in-law. Bill's sassy former fiancée, May, has met and piqued the interest of his affable friend and best man, Hale. Hale recognizes Bill's valet, Spike, as an ex-convict; Spike is guarding the pearls that Bill has bought for Molly as her wedding gift. Spike's sticky-fingered girlfriend, Fanny, tries to persuade him to pocket the wedding gifts, but he wishes that they could put their old prison days behind them.

May calls unexpectedly on Bill's wedding day, to say that she will soon arrive, and she points out that they are still engaged. Bill and Hale scheme to convince her that he is a ladies' man, and not worthy to marry her. Hale catches Fanny trying to pocket the pearls and forces her to agree to help with Bill's charade. May arrives; it turns out that she has been hired as a dressmaker for the wedding by Molly's mother. May admits that she is no longer interested in Bill and wishes him well, and she returns Hale's interest. But when Molly returns, she is confronted by Fanny, who is pretending to be Bill's girlfriend – and the pearls are missing.

Act II

That night, Hale hosts a party on the roof of Bill's Greenwich Village apartment. Molly's mother has called off the wedding. May is flirting with various men, making Hale jealous. Spike and Fanny arrive to announce that they are now married. Fanny tells Spike that she does not have the pearls, but she is very nervous when a British private detective shows up.

Molly comes to talk with Bill, and they have a romantic moment before her mother shows up. Bill awkwardly tries to explain to Mrs. Farrington what happened, and Hale asks May to marry him. But Molly and her mother find May at Bill's bedroom door and conclude that Bill had been entertaining her in his apartment. Finally, the real thief confesses, Molly finds out that May and Hale are engaged, and a happy ending ensues with a double wedding.

== Roles and original cast ==
- Mollie Farrington – Vivienne Segal
- Mrs. Farrington, her mother – Margaret Dale
- Willoughby "Bill" Finch – Carl Randall
- Hale Underwood, Bill's friend – Harry C. Browne
- Spike Hudgins, an ex-con valet – Edward Abeles
- Fanny Welch, Spike's pick-pocket sweetheart – Florence Shirley
- May Barber, Willoughby's ex-fiancée – Carroll McComas
- Cyril Twombley, a clueless British detective – Reginald Mason
- William Watty, a building superintendent – Harry Fisher
- Mollie's friends

== Musical numbers ==
Act 1

- I'm to Be Married Today – Mollie Farrington and Girls
- Not Yet – Mollie and Bill Finch
- Do It Now – Spike Hudgins, Hale Underwood and Bill
- Our Little Nest – Spike and Fanny Welch
- Do Look at Him! – Mollie and Girls
- Oh, Lady! Lady! – Bill and Girls
- You Found Me and I Found You – May Barber and Hale

Act 2

- Moon (The Moon Song) – Hale and Chorus
- Waiting Around the Corner – May and Boys
- Little Ships Come Sailing Home – Mollie and Girls
- Before I Met You – Bill and Mollie
- Greenwich Village – Bill, Spike and Fanny
- Wheatless Days – Hale and May
- It's a Hard, Hard World for a Man – Bill, Hale and Cyril Twombley

== Adaptations and recordings ==
In 1920 the musical was adapted into a silent film, Oh, Lady, Lady starring Bebe Daniels. In 1927 Wodehouse adapted Oh, Lady! Lady!! into a novel called The Small Bachelor. A recording of a concert performance is available from the Comic Opera Guild.
