= Florence Shirley =

American actress (1892–1967

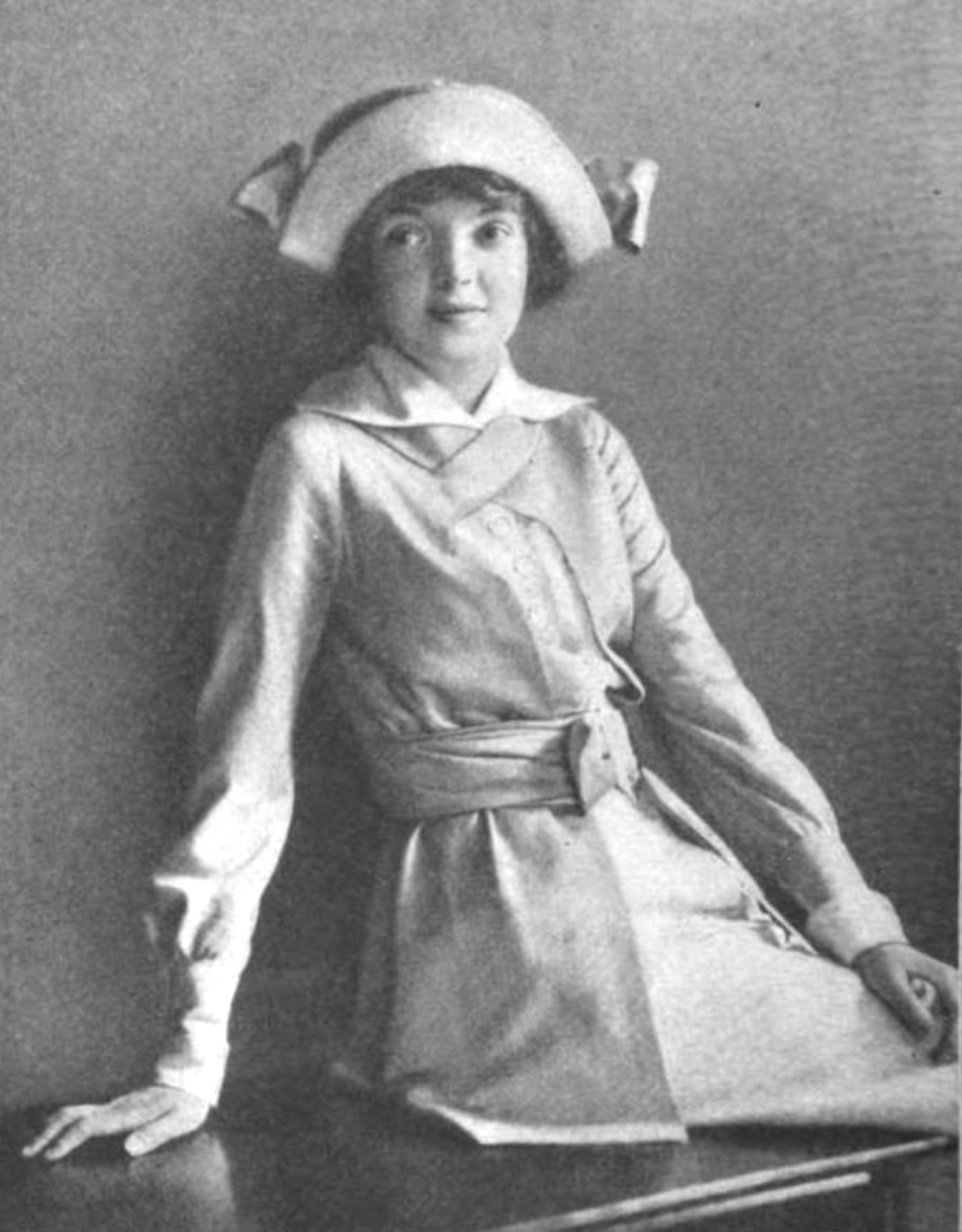
- Shirley in 1918
- Born: Florence Isabell Splaine; June 5, 1892; New York City, U.S.
- Died: May 12, 1967 (aged 74); Hollywood, California, U.S.
- Occupation: Actress
- Years active: 1906–1952
- Spouse: A. J. Koehler (m. 1917)

Florence Shirley, born Florence Isabell Splaine, (June 5, 1892 – May 12, 1967) was an American stage and film actress. She made her stage debut in 1906 at the age of 14 in small part in a Christmas pantomime at the Castle Square Theatre in Boston. She continued to perform periodically in children's roles at that theatre until progressing into adult ingenue roles in 1909. She was a resident player at Castle Square until September 1911 when she left to tour as Pearl Williams in Karl Hoschna's original musical The Wall Street Girl. She made her Broadway debut it that role in 1912, and then returned to Castle Square where she was a resident performer once again until the fall 1914. She came to wider attention as The Flapper in the hit play His Majesty Bunker Bean; touring nationally in the role in 1915-1916 and appearing in a lengthy run in Chicago prior to performing the part on Broadway in 1916.

After the success of Bunker Bean, Shirley appeared in numerous Broadway plays and musicals through 1932; including creating the roles of Fanny Welch in Oh, Lady! Lady!! (1918) and Mrs. Anna Merton in Apple Blossoms (1920). She later made one last appearance in New York after a 13 year long absence in Alice in Arms in 1945.

Shirley relocated to California, and began a career as a film character actress with the 1939 film The Women in the role of Miss Archer. She appeared in more than 50 films; often appearing in small uncredited parts, but also occasionally appearing in larger supporting parts. She died in Hollywood, California in 1967 at the age of 74.

== Early life ==
Florence Shirley was born in New York City on June 5, 1892. Her birth name was Florence Isabell Splaine and she was the daughter of Francis Splaine. Her sister, Blanche Shirley, was also a stage actress.

== Career beginning at the Castle Square Theatre ==
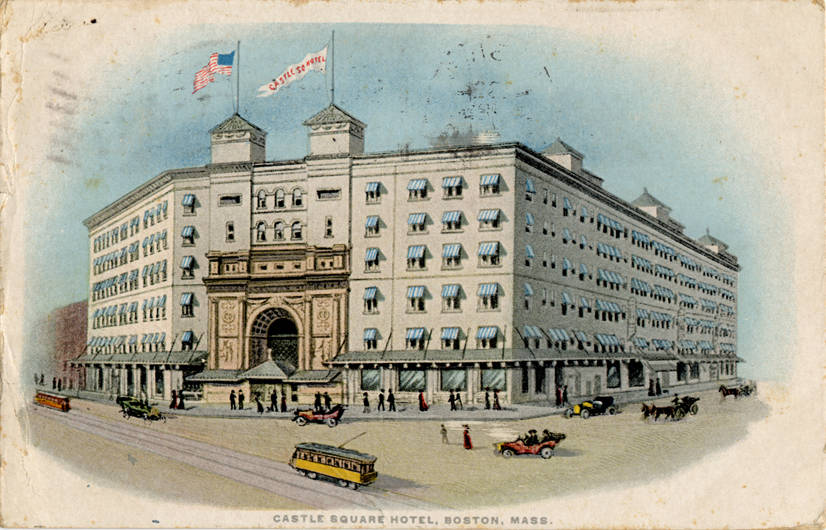
Castle Square Hotel and Theatre in Boston.

Shirley made her stage debut in 1906 in a small role in a Christmas pantomime at the Castle Square Theatre in Boston at the age of 14. The director of the Castle Square Stock Company, John Craig, subsequently cast her in other children's parts in other plays, including boys' parts in productions of Shakespeare's plays. She ultimately progressed into adult roles with the company with whom she worked as an ingenue.

Some of the first larger parts Shirley performed at Castle Square included Maria in The School for Scandal (1909), Esther Strong in Denman Thompson and George W. Ryer's Our New Minister (1909), Ione Nuneham in Henry Arthur Jones's The Evangelist (1909), Marie in A Parisian Romance (1909), Mollie Worth in Leo Ditrichstein's All On Account of Eliza (1909), Charyllis in John Stapleton's A Bachelor's Honeymoon (1909), Rose Budd in Charles H. Hoyt's A Contented Woman (1909), and Nami in The Geisha (1909). The latter role brought her good reviews in The Boston Globe which stated "Miss Florence Shirley is making an emphatic hit at the Castle Square in the character of Nami. She sings a duet "Jap-Jap Jappy" with Wilfrid Young that invariably brings down the house."

Shirley began the year 1910 portraying the Fairy Queen in the Castle Square production of the pantomime 1915. Other roles she portrayed with the company that year included: Edward, Prince of Wales in Richard III, Lulu Bloodgood in Ditrichstein's Are You A Mason?, Dicky in Theodore Burt Sayre's Tom Moore, Rosalie in The Marriage of Kitty, Florence Henderson in Rida Johnson Young's The Boys of Company "B", Trixie Clayton in Brewster's Millions, Nellie Garthorne in J. Hartley Manners and Henry Miller's Zira, Dorothy Tremble in Sydney Grundy and Henry Pettitt's The Bells of Haslemere, Helda in George Broadhurst's The Crown Prince, Violet Lansdowne in Clyde Fitch's Girls, Lily Bell in Edward Peple's The Love Route, Mrs. Denham Lane in Michael Morton's My Wife, and Geraldine Wilcox in George M. Cohan's musical The Talk of New York.

Shirley ended 1910 and began 1911 at Castle Square portraying Little Miss Muffet in A. Baldwin Sloane's Jack and the Beanstalk. Her 1911 appearances at Castle Square included Osric in Hamlet, Dolly Foulis in Evelyn Greenleaf Sutherland's The Road to Yesterday, Liza in Goethe's Faust, Louka in George Bernard Shaw's Arms and the Man, Jessica in The Merchant of Venice, Dick in Little Lord Fauntleroy, Helen Heyer in The Lottery Man, Josephine Van Dusen in Cecil B. DeMille's The Genius, Lucille Perkins in Edith Ellis's Mary Jane's Pa, Marion Hayste in H.A. Du Souchet's My Friend From India, Beatriz in David Belasco and Richard Walton Tully's The Rose of the Rancho, and Hope Georgia Langdon in A Gentleman from Mississippi.

== The Wall Street Girl, Broadway debut, and return to Boston ==
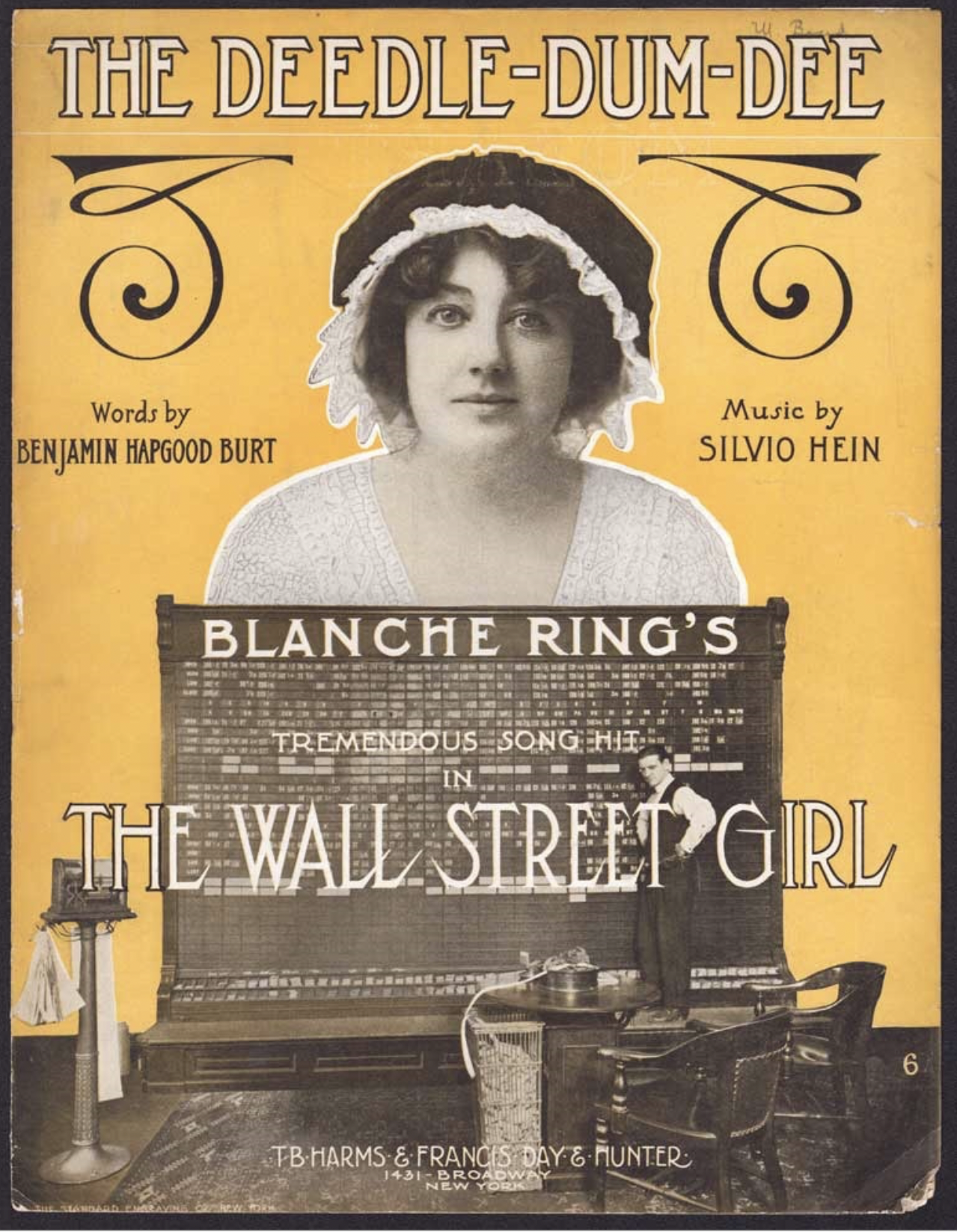
Front cover of the 1911 sheet music for The Wall Street Girl.

In September 1911 Shirley left her position with Castle Square Theatre to join Blanche Ring's theatre troupe. She made her debut with the company in the premiere of a new musical by composer Karl Hoschna, The Wall Street Girl, at the Majestic Theatre in Harrisburg, Pennsylvania on October 5, 1911. Shirley played the role of Pearl Williams in the production and was featured singing the song "(Come With Me to) Spoony Land" in the show. The production toured nationally in 1911-1912; ultimately reaching Broadway's George M. Cohan Theatre on April 15, 1912. The sinking of the Titanic occurred on the same day as her Broadway debut, and she participated in a benefit concert for those impacted by the tragedy later in the week at the George M. Cohan Theatre on April 20, 1912.

After the Broadway run of The Wall Street Girl ended, Shirley returned to Boston to star as the lead heroine in a new play by dramatist and The Boston Globe cartoonist Ed Payne entitled The Edge of the Whirlpool at Keith's Theatre with Donald Meek as her co-star. She returned to the Castle Square Theatre for the 1912-1913 season. Her roles during that period included Phyllis Faraday in A. E. W. Mason's Green Stalkings, Cynthia Garrison in George Broadhurst's The Man of the Hour, Carrie in James Forbes's The Commuters, Helene in Alexandre Bisson's Madame X, and Margery Daw in The Gingerbread Man.

In February 1913 Shirley rejoined The Wall Street Girl company which reformed for a limited run of more performances in Georgia. She returned to Boston the following month to perform the role of Mrs. Honeyton in Spenser Theyre-Smith's one-act comedy A Happy Pair at the Plymouth Theatre. In April and May 1913 she was once again at the Castle Square Theatre as Setsu in David Belasco's The Darling of the Gods, Ethel Granger-Simpson in Booth Tarkington's The Man from Home, Constance Neville in Oliver Goldsmith's She Stoops to Conquer, Dorothy Welles in George M. Cohan's Get-Rich-Quick Wallingford, Saide Adams in The Fires of Fate, and Lesbia in The Comedy of Errors.

Shirley continued to perform as a resident member of the Castle Street Theatre into 1914. Some of the other roles she performed with the company included Amy Leroy in Edgar Selwyn's The Country Boy, Jane Cauldwell in Sag Harbor, Miss Lucy in Anne Crawford Flexner's Mrs. Wiggs of the Cabbage Patch, Gabrielle Kate in The "Mind the Paint" Girl, Kate Ballard in J. B. Fagan's Hawthorne of the U.S.A., and Vickey in Hubert Henry Davies's Mrs. Gorringe's Necklace.

== Later career ==
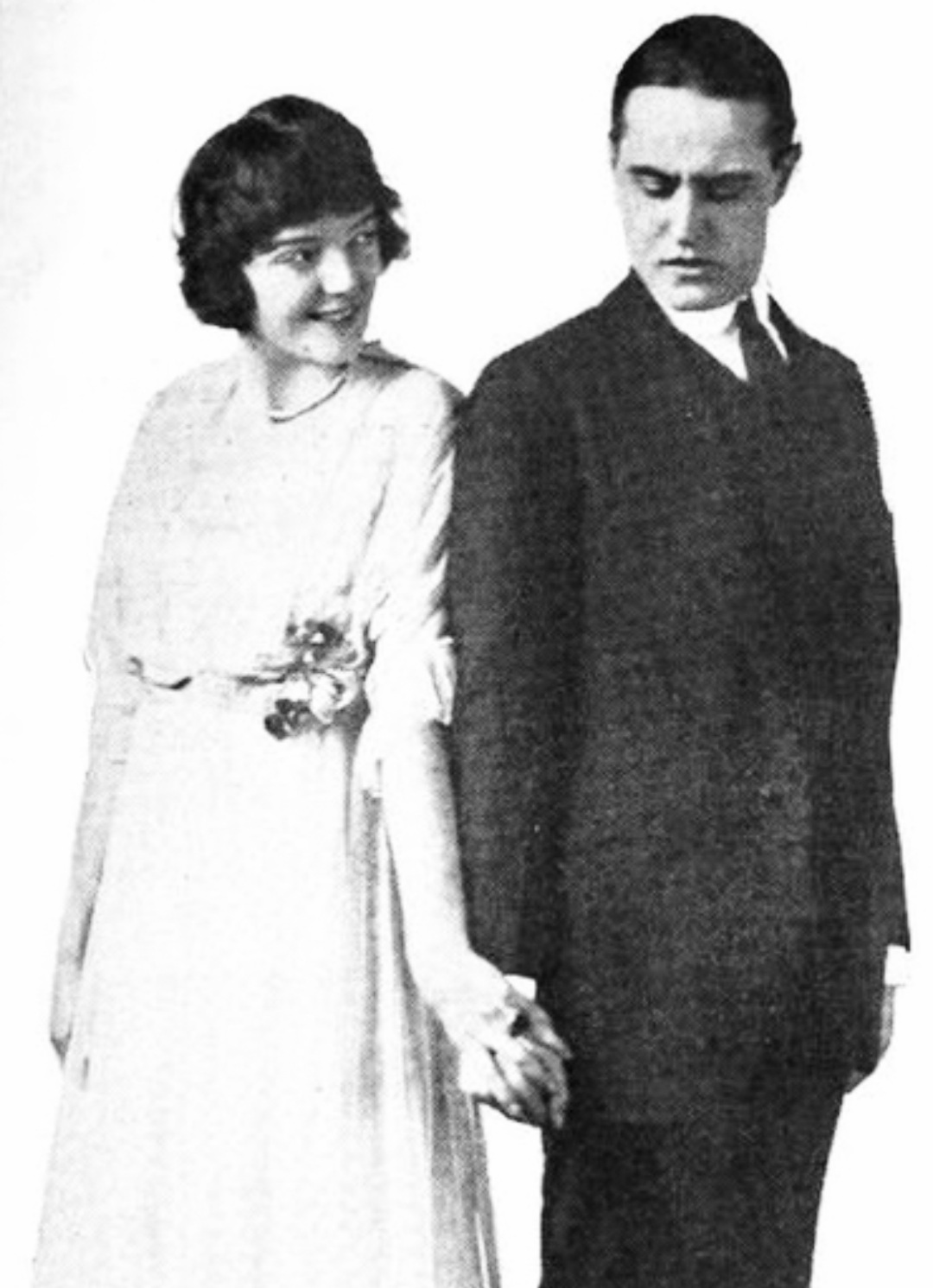
Florence Shirley and Taylor Holmes, in His Majesty Bunker Bean, from a 1916 publication

In the fall of 1914 Shirley toured in the title role of the original production of Holman Day's Along Came Ruth; succeeding Irene Fenwick who had originated the role. The production was produced by Henry W. Savage. She continued to tour in the part in 1915. In September 1915 she created the role of The Flapper in the premiere of Taylor Holmes, in His Majesty Bunker Bean at the Garrick Theatre in Detroit. She toured nationally in the part; and portrayed the role in a six-month long run in Chicago at the Cort Theatre where it was a hit play. She was still in the part when the production reached Broadway's Astor Theatre on October 2, 1916.

Shirley enjoyed moderate success on Broadway during her career. In 1918 she starred in Jerome Kern, Guy Bolton, and P. G. Wodehouse's musical Oh, Lady! Lady!! at the Princess Theatre. Her last Broadway appearance was in Alice in Arms (originally called Star in the Window) alongside Kirk Douglas.

In 1943 she was a voice actress in the Lux Radio Theatre radio adaptation of the 1942 film The Pride of the Yankees with Gary Cooper reprising his role from the movie.

She appeared in more than 50 films throughout her film career.

== Personal life and death ==
On February 14, 1917, Shirley married efficiency engineer A. J. Koehler in New York City.

Shirley died in Hollywood, California on May 12, 1967.

== Performance credits ==
=== Broadway ===
- The Wall Street Girl (1912, as Pearl Williams)
- His Majesty Bunker Bean (1916, as The Flapper)
- Anthony in Wonderland (1917, as All Aloney)
- Oh, Lady! Lady!! (1918, as Fanny Welch)
- Apple Blossoms (1920, as Mrs. Anna Merton)
- Why Men Leave Home (1923, as Fifi)
- My Aunt From Ypsilanti (1923, as Peggy)
- The Locked Door (1924, as Muriel Walling)
- The Poor Nut (1925, as Julia Winters)
- Embers (1926, as Germaine Bie)
- Doctor X (1931, as Eleanor Stevens)
- Fast Service (1931, as Doris Borden)
- Take My Tip (1932, as Mrs. Dolly Browning)
- Alice in Arms (1945, as Daisy)

=== Selected filmography ===
- The Women (1939, as Miss Archer)
- Ninotchka (1939, as Marianne)
- Balalaika (1939, as Mrs. Allison)
- I Take This Woman (1940, as Mrs. Bettincourt)
- Opened by Mistake (1940, as Elizabeth Stiles)
- Private Affairs (1940, as Mrs. Gilkin)
- New Moon (1940, as Guest)
- Pier 13 (1940, as Mrs. Forrest)
- Third Finger, Left Hand (1940, as Agnes)
- Lady with Red Hair (1940, as Daisy Dawn)
- Earthbound (1940, as Bertha)
- Nice Girl? (1941, as Woman Gossip)
- Three Sons o' Guns (1941, as Mrs. Tyler)
- When Ladies Meet (1941, as Janet Hopper)
- It Started with Eve (1941, unnamed part)
- We Were Dancing (1942, as Mrs. Charteris)
- Her Cardboard Lover (1942, Woman)
- Maisie Gets Her Man (1942, as Mrs. Taylor)
- A Yank at Eton (1942, as Mrs. Sampson)
- Let's Face It (1943, Woman in Sun Shell Cafe)
- The Dancing Masters (1943, Dowager)
- Deadline - U.S.A. (1952, Miss Barndollar)
- Stars and Stripes Forever (1952, Navy Nurse)
