= Helmy Kresa =

- Born: November 7, 1904; Meissen, Germany
- Died: 1991 (aged 86–87)
- Occupations: Composer and the principal arranger and orchestrator for Irving Berlin
- Children: Kent Kresa

Helmy Kresa (born in Meissen, Germany on November 7, 1904, died 1991, Long Island, New York) was a songwriter and the principal arranger and orchestrator for Irving Berlin.

In 1926, Kresa began working for Berlin, where he transcribed what Berlin was playing into musical manuscript form as Berlin could neither read nor write music, eventually becoming the general professional manager of the Irving Berlin Music Company.

In 1931, Kresa wrote "That's My Desire", which Frankie Laine, Louis Armstrong and a host of others recorded. Kresa's was the first published arrangement of "All of Me", written by Gerald Marks and Seymour Simons. He also acted as the arranger for Berlin for some stage musicals, including Call Me Madam (1952), Miss Liberty (1950) and Annie Get Your Gun (1949).

In 1953, Kresa, Sammy Gallop, and Michael Grace collaborated on the following songs:

- Midnight in New York
- Teeny, Weeny Martini
- Cradled in the Arms of Love

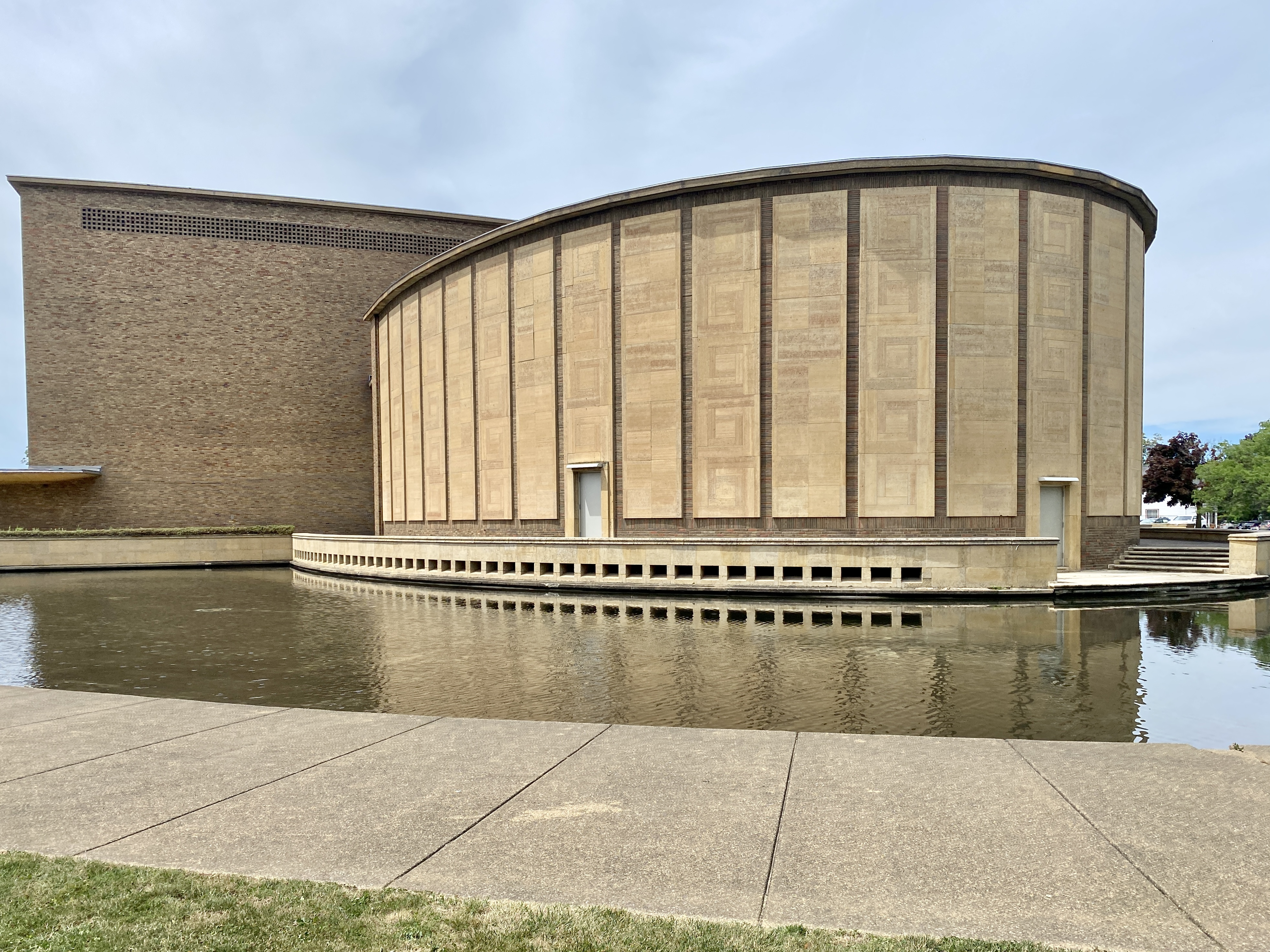
Kleinhans Music Hall

In that same year (1953), the Buffalo Philharmonic Orchestra, with Alfonso D'Artega as conductor, performed the musical composition co-written by Kresa, Michael Grace, and Maestro D'Artega, in the Summer Pops Concert at Kleinhans Music Hall in Buffalo, New York. The composition, titled Space Taxi Selections, was described by the Buffalo Courier-Express as "musical impressionism with a jive tempo". The newspaper also reported how the selections "brought a burst of applause from the audience".

In 1980, he had composed the instrumental music for Martin Scorsese's film Raging Bull. He died of pneumonia in Southampton Hospital, Southampton, Long Island, New York.

His son is Kent Kresa, born in 1932, the former chairman and CEO of Northrop Grumman, as well as chairman of General Motors

== Discography ==
| Title | Year | Words | Lyrics |
|---|---|---|---|
| Freddy the Rabbit: Opera in Four Minutes | 1948 | Lenny Ross | Helmy Kresa |
| Oscar the Octopus: Opera in Four Minutes | 1948 | Lenny Ross | Helmy Kresa |
| My O-HI-O Heaven | 1951 | Helmy Kresa & Al Lewis | Helmy Kresa & Al Lewis |
| Miracle of Fatima | 1952 | Michael Grace | Helmy Kresa |
| Midnight in New York | 1953 | Sammy Gallop | Hemly Kresa & Michael Grace |
| Love Waltz | 1953 | Michael Grace | Helmy Kresa & Michael Grace |
| I Will Follow Your Star | 1952 | Michael Grace | Helmy Kresa |
| Fourth Man Theme | 1953 | | Helmy Kresa & Michael Grace |
| Teeny, Weeny Martini | 1953 | Sammy Gallop | Helmy Kresa & Michael Grace |
| Cradled in the Arms of Love | 1953 | Sammy Gallop | Helmy Kresa & Michael Grace |
