= E. W. Royce =

British actor

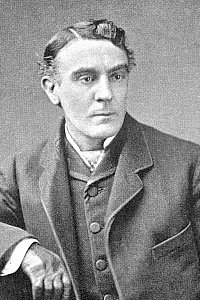
E. W. Royce

Edward William Royce (11 August 1841 – 24 January 1926), born Edward William Reddall, was a British actor, singer and dancer noted for playing in Victorian burlesque at London's Gaiety Theatre, usually alongside Nelly Farren, Edward O'Connor Terry and Kate Vaughan until 1882. His theatrical career spanned five decades, from 1860 to 1908. His son was the director Edward Royce.

== Early life and career ==
Royce was born as Edward William Reddall in Eversholt, Bedfordshire, in 1841, the younger of two sons born to Charlotte née Ayres (born 1801) and James Reddall (born 1805), a commercial traveller. His acting career began in 1860 when he made his début at the Theatre Royal, Covent Garden as a dancer in Un ballo in maschera. In 1870 at York he married Emily Watson (born 1850), and with her had a son, James William Royce Reddall (1870–1964), who later performed and choreographed as E. W. Royce, Jr. Emily presumably died in childbirth or soon afterwards, and in 1873, listed as a widower and a comedian, at Lambeth he married Marie Wood Smithers (1855–1932), an actress and singer and later a teacher of stage dancing. With her he had six more children: Marie Elizabeth (1874–1957); Louisa Caroline (1875–1953); Edward Alphonse (born 1878); Elizabeth Charlotte (born 1880); Albert Edward Ambrose (born 1885) and Florence Victoria (born 1887). His daughters Louisa, Elizabeth and Florence became stage dancers, using the stage name Royce.

Among his many early parts was the title role in W. S. Gilbert's farcical comedy Tom Cobb at the St James's Theatre (1875). Joining the theatrical company of Selina Dolaro, then under the joint management of Richard D'Oyly Carte and George Dolby, he appeared as Ulric in The Duke's Daughter (1876) and was Job Wort in Tom Taylor's one-act farce A Blighted Being, variously at the Royalty Theatre, the Globe Theatre and the Charing Cross Theatre (January–March 1876).

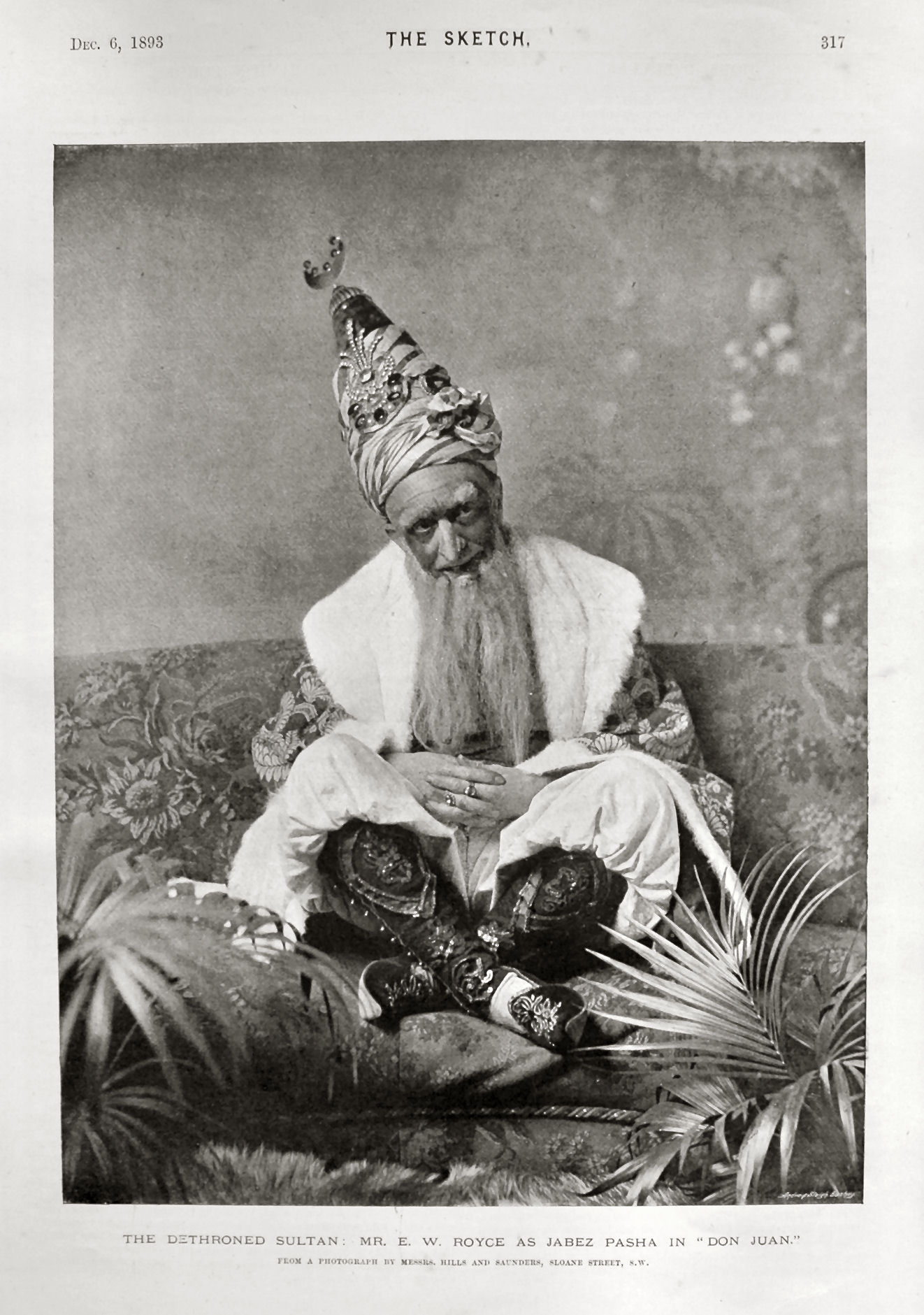
As Jabez Pasha in Don Juan (1893)

Photograph and signatures of the famous Gaiety foursome: Farren, Terry, Vaughan and Royce (standing) in The Forty Thieves at the Gaiety (1880–81)

'Teddy' Royce became a star at John Hollingshead's Gaiety Theatre in London along with Nellie Farren, Edward O'Connor Terry and Kate Vaughan at a time when the theatre was specialising in Victorian burlesque. Here among other roles he played Don Jose in Henry James Byron's Little Don Cesar de Bazan (1876); Count Arnheim in The Bohemian G-yurl and the Unapproachable Pole (1877); Hassarac in The Forty Thieves (1880–81), and was part of the quartette in the Gaiety's burlesque pantomime Aladdin; or, the Sacred Lamp over Christmas 1881–82.

== Later years ==
Owing to ill-health Royce ceased acting in 1882 but had recovered sufficiently by early 1886 to join May Fortescue's London company in a tour of W. S. Gilbert's Gretchen, among other plays. Later in 1886 he went to Australia to play in comedies, burlesques, dramas and pantomime, taking his family with him and remaining there until 1892, touring with the Brough-Boucicault London Gaiety Company, under engagement to Williamson, Garner and Musgrove. The company, after visiting Adelaide and Melbourne first appeared in Sydney on 28 May 1886 at the Theatre Royal in the burlesque Little Jack Sheppard in which his wife Marie Royce appeared as Blueskin. On his return to England in 1892 he began to direct and choreograph, as well as continuing to act, playing Jabez Pasha in Don Juan (1893) at the Gaiety. He took part in the last night performance there in 1903, before its demolition, along with Gaiety stars past and present, including Constance Loseby, Lionel Brough, Richard Temple and Henry Irving. As the last-surviving member of the famous old Gaiety foursome, he stepped forward to acknowledge applause. In 1908 he created the role of Old Jacques in The Belle of Brittany at the Queen's Theatre. In the 1911 Census he is listed as "an actor, out of employment".

Royce died in Wandsworth, London, in 1926 aged 84.
