= Dale Wood (composer) =

American composer (1934–2003)

Dale Wood was a composer, organist, and choral director best known for his church music compositions. He was born on February 13, 1934, in Glendale, California, and died April 13, 2003. Wood began writing compositions at a young age. When he was 13 years old, he won a national hymn-writing contest for the American Lutheran Church.

== Achievements ==
- Contributing editor to the Journal of Church Music
- Headed the publication committee of the Choristers Guild from 1970 to 1974
- Music director at the Grace Cathedral School for Boys in San Francisco from 1973–1974
- Editor for The Sacred Music Press from 1975–1996
- Editor emeritus of The Sacred Music Press from 1996–2001
- Exemplar Medallion from California Lutheran University in 1993

== Bibliography ==
- James Welch (May 8, 2020). Dale Wood: The Man and the Music. ASIN B088DFJJZ7.
- The Essential Dale Wood: 40 Classic Hymn Tune Settings for Organ. Dayton, OH: Lorenz Publishing Company. 2014. ISBN 978-1429130011.
- Hemidemisemiquavers ... and other such things. Dayton, Ohio: Heritage Music Press. 1989. ISBN 0893281034. OCLC 20070672. LCCN 88-83507
