= Edward Royce (director) =

English director and choreographer of musical theatre

- Born: James William Reddall; 14 December 1870; Bath, England, British Empire
- Died: 15 June 1964 (aged 93); London, England, United Kingdom
- Occupations: Director; Choreographer
- Father: E. W. Royce

Edward Royce or Edward Royce Jr. (born James William Reddall; 14 December 1870 – 15 June 1964) was an English director and choreographer of musical theatre, best remembered for his series of successful productions on Broadway. His father was the actor, dancer, singer and stage manager E. W. Royce.

Royce choreographed and/or directed more than a dozen comic operas and Edwardian musical comedies in London from 1902 to 1916, most of them for George Edwardes. Moving to Broadway, he directed a series of musicals, including several Princess Theatre musicals, including Oh, Boy! (1917), and such other successes as Irene (1919), Sally (1920), and several Ziegfeld productions.

Royce also directed in Australia and elsewhere in the United States, choreographed a few motion picture musicals, and later returned to England to direct a revival of A Waltz Dream (1934) and co-author a musical comedy, Fritzi (1935).

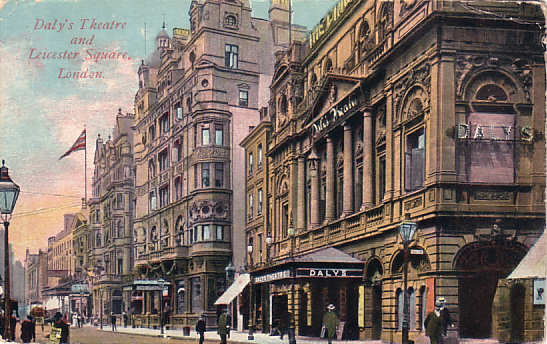
Daly's Theatre (1905), where Royce directed several shows from 1909 to 1916

== Life and career ==
Royce was born in Bath, England. He studied scenic art before becoming a dancer. On the London stage, early in his career, he choreographed and/or staged Merrie England (1902–1903), A Princess of Kensington (1903 also dancing a duet with Winifred Hart-Dyke), and shows for George Edwardes, including A Waltz Dream (1908), Our Miss Gibbs (1909), The Dollar Princess (1909), The Girl in the Train (1910), Peggy (1911), The Count of Luxemburg (1911), Gypsy Love (1912) The Marriage Market (1913) and The Happy Day (1916).

Moving to Broadway, he directed The Century Girl (1916), Sally (1920), The Ziegfeld Follies (1920–1921), several other Ziegfeld shows, the hit musical Irene (1919), and Kid Boots (1923) among many others. For No, No, Nanette, Royce directed the show's pre-Broadway run in Chicago, in 1924, but did not direct the Broadway run in 1925. A series of musicals, known as the Princess Theatre musicals, were produced on Broadway between 1915 and 1919, written by the team of Jerome Kern, Guy Bolton and (usually) P. G. Wodehouse. Royce directed the most successful show in the series, Oh, Boy! (1917), which ran for 463 performances (the last few months at the Casino Theatre), making it the third-longest running Broadway musical in the 1910s. Royce directed two other shows in 1917 created by the Princess Theatre team, Leave It to Jane and Have a Heart, which were presented at other Broadway theatres. The same busy year, he also directed an unrelated Broadway hit, Going Up. The following year, he directed the final two Princess Theatre musicals, Oh, Lady! Lady!! and Oh, My Dear!.

Royce also directed in Australia and on the West Coast of the United States. He later choreographed such motion picture musicals as Married in Hollywood (1929), Words and Music (1929), and the British film Aunt Sally (1933) which was released in the U.S. as Along Came Sally (1934).

He returned to London to direct a revival of A Waltz Dream (1934) and co-authored a romantic musical comedy, Fritzi (1935). His last production was at the Bristol Hippodrome in 1954. He died in London at the age of 93.

== Theatre credits ==
=== Britain ===
Show	Opening	Role	Theatre
Merrie England	1902	Stage manager/ Dance & choral effects arranger	Savoy
A Princess of Kensington	1903	Stage manager/ Dance & choral effects arranger	Savoy
The Earl and the Girl	1905	Director	Prince's, Bristol
A Waltz Dream	1908	Director	Hicks
Our Miss Gibbs	1909	Director	Gaiety
The Dollar Princess	1909	Stage Director	Daly's
The Girl in the Train	1910	Director	Vaudeville
Peggy	1911	Stage director	Gaity
The Count of Luxemburg	1911	Stage director	Daly's
Gypsy Love	1912	Director	Daly's
The Doll Girl	1913	Choreographer	Globe
The Marriage Market	1913	Producer & director	Daly's
Tina	1915	Stage director	Adelphi
The Happy Day	1916	Stage director	Daly's
A Waltz Dream	1934	Director	Winter Garden
Fritzi	1935	Co-author (book)	Adelphi & Shaftesbury
A Waltz Dream	1942	Director	Bristol Hippodrome
Salute the Soldier	1944	Director	Bristol Hippodrome
The Count of Luxemburg	1954	Director	Bristol Hippodrome

=== United States ===
Show	Opening	Role	Location^{a}
The Doll Girl	25 August 1913	Choreographer	Globe Theatre
The Marriage Market	22 September 1913	Director	Knickerbocker Theatre
The Laughing Husband	2 February 1914	Director	Knickerbocker Theatre
Betty	3 October 1916	Director	Globe Theatre
The Century Girl	6 November 1916	Director	Century Theatre
Have a Heart	11 January 1917	Director	Liberty Theatre
Oh, Boy!	20 February 1917	Director	Princess Theatre
Leave It to Jane	28 August 1917	Director	Longacre Theatre
Kitty Darlin'	7 November 1917	Director	Casino Theatre
Going Up	25 December 1917	Director	Liberty Theatre
Oh, Lady! Lady!!	1 February 1918	Director	Princess Theatre
Rock-A-Bye Baby	22 May 1918	Director	Astor Theatre
The Canary	4 November 1918	Director	Globe Theatre
Oh, My Dear!	27 November 1918	Director	Princess Theatre
Come Along	8 April 1919	Director	Nora Bayes Theatre
She's a Good Fellow	5 May 1919	Co-director	Globe Theatre
Apple Blossoms	7 October 1919	Co-director	Globe Theatre
Irene	18 November 1919	Director	Vanderbilt Theatre
Lassie	6 April 1920	Director	Nora Bayes Theatre
Ziegfeld Follies of 1920	21 June 1921	Director	New Amsterdam Theatre
Kissing Time	11 October 1920	Director	Lyric Theatre
Sally	21 December 1920	Director	New Amsterdam Theatre
Ziegfeld Midnight Frolic (1920)	1 February 1921	Director	Ziegfeld Roof
Ziegfeld 9 O'Clock Frolic	8 February 1921	Director	Danse de Follies
Ziegfeld Follies of 1921	21 June 1921	Director	Globe Theatre
The Love Letter	4 October 1921	Director	Globe Theatre
Good Morning Dearie	1 November 1921	Director	Globe Theatre
Orange Blossoms	19 September 1922	Director/Producer	Fulton Theatre
Irene	2 April 1923	Director	Jolson's 59th Street Theatre
Cinders	3 April 1923	Director/Producer	Dresden Theatre
Sally	17 September 1923	Director	New Amsterdam Theatre
Kid Boots	31 December 1923	Director	Earl Carroll Theatre
Annie Dear	4 November 1924	Director	Times Square Theatre
No, No, Nanette	1924	Director	Harris Theatre, Chicago (pre-Broadway production)
Louie the 14th	3 March 1925	Director	Cosmopolitan Theatre
Princess Ida	13 April 1925	Director	Sam S. Shubert Theatre
No Foolin'	24 June 1926	Director	Globe Theatre
The Merry Malones	26 September 1927	Co-director	Erlanger's Theatre
She's My Baby	3 January 1928	Director	Globe Theatre
Billie	1 October 1928	Director	Erlanger's Theatre

- ^{a}Broadway, unless otherwise specified

== Filmography ==
Filmography
Title	Year	Role
Married in Hollywood	1929	Dance director
Words and Music	1929	Ensemble director
Aunt Sally (in the US, titled Along Came Sally (1934))	1933	Choreographer
