= Buffalo Philharmonic Orchestra =

American symphony orchestra

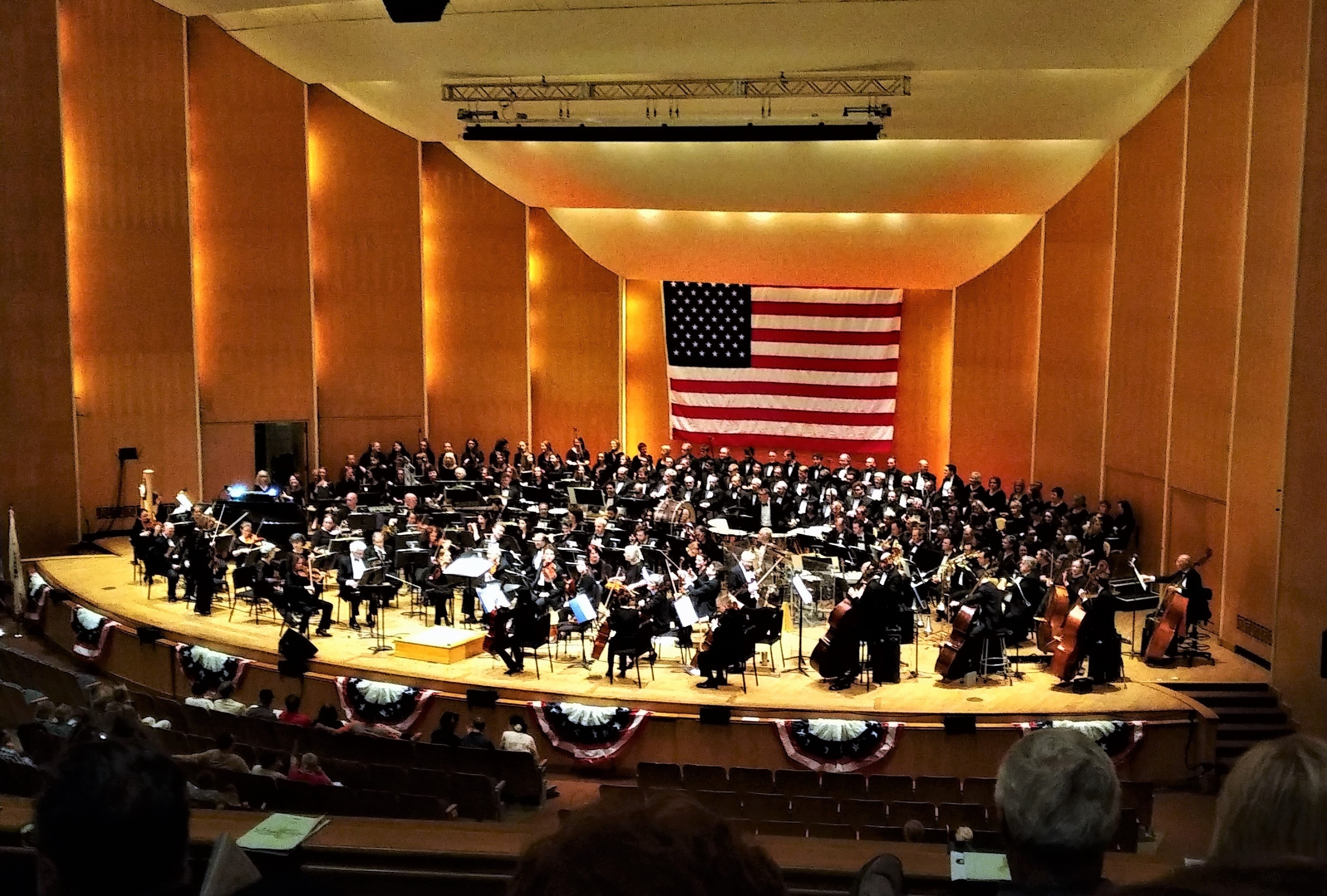
The Buffalo Philharmonic Orchestra and Chorus in Kleinhans Music Hall

The Buffalo Philharmonic Orchestra is an American symphony orchestra located in Buffalo, New York led by music director JoAnn Falletta. Its primary performing venue is Kleinhans Music Hall, which is a National Historic Landmark. Each season it presents over 120 classical series, pops, rock, youth, and family concerts. During the summer months, the orchestra performs at parks and outdoor venues across Western New York.

== History ==
=== Creation and early years ===
During the late 1920s and early 30s, considerable efforts were made to foster interest in a professional orchestra for the Greater Buffalo community. By late 1934, via the efforts of Cameron Baird, Frederick Slee and Samuel P. Capen, a conductor of extensive European training was recruited to Buffalo in the person of Lajos Shuk, a cellist and director of the New York Civic Symphony. Two buildings which house the music department at the University at Buffalo have been named after Baird and Slee, while the university's main administration building is named after Capen. Shortly thereafter, the Buffalo Philharmonic Orchestra Society was formed and a series of classics concerts and the first BPO youth concerts were presented in the 1935–36 season.

Through the leadership of Society President Mrs. Florence B. Wendt, funds were raised to maintain a viable ensemble through 1937 when support was received from the federal WPA project, which sponsored additional players and recruited a conductor named Franco Autori from the Dallas Symphony. Over the next two seasons the orchestra suffered various administrative and financial growing pains. The orchestra also began performing run-out concerts to neighboring localities like Niagara Falls. By the opening of the 1939–40 season, the society and the Greater Buffalo community were ready to provide support for the expansion of both the classical and lighter 'Pops' programming by the orchestra.

=== Kleinhans Music Hall ===
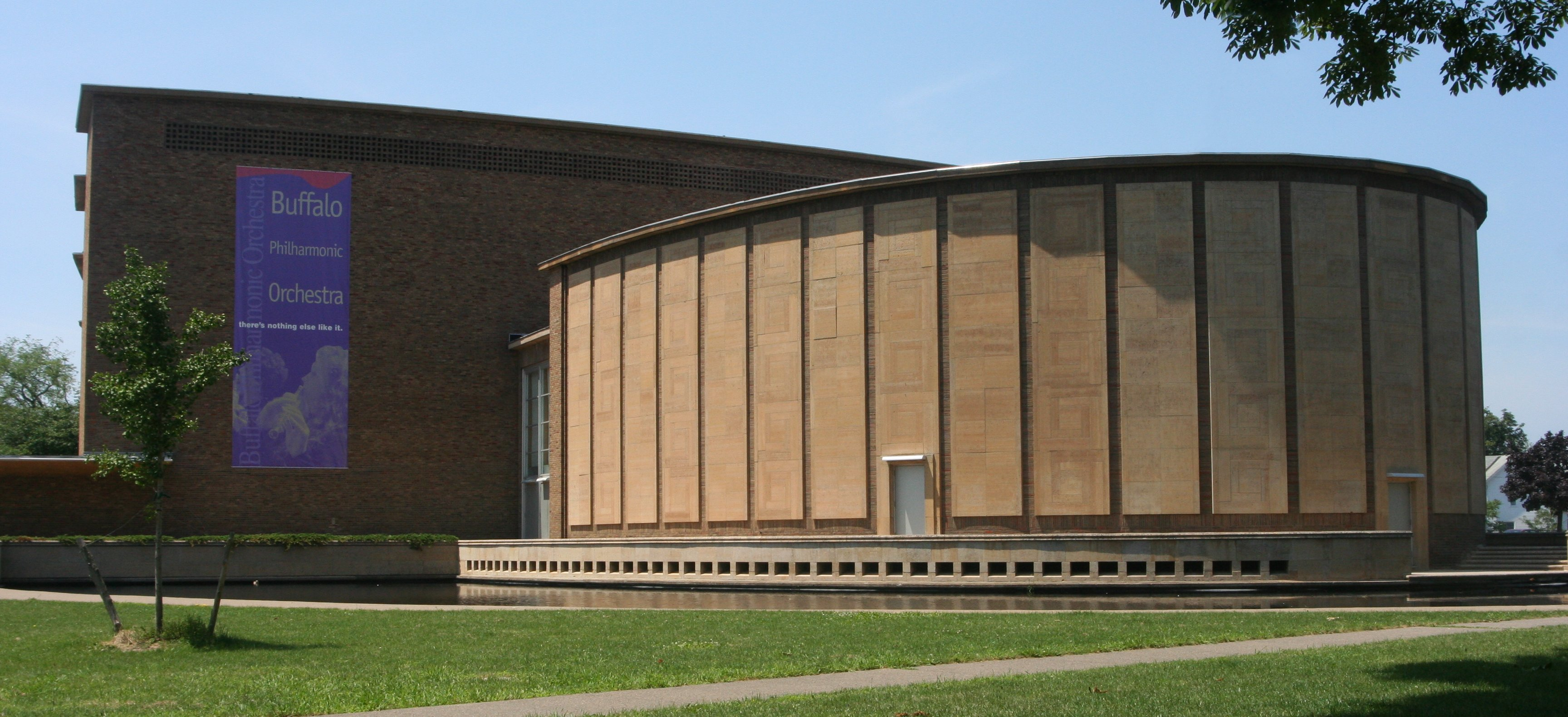
Kleinhans Music Hall, the main base of the orchestra

Kleinhans Music Hall was opened in the fall of 1940. Constructed with funds in part bequeathed by Edward L. Kleinhans and Mary Seaton Kleinhans, the hall has since served as the orchestra's permanent home. Kleinhans Music Hall was designated a National Historic Landmark in 1989. The hall was designed by Eliel and Eero Saarinen. Though some improvements have been made, there have been little changes since the construction of the hall. The hall has a seating capacity of 2,400.

The BPO dedication concert of Kleinhans in October 1940 allowed the orchestra to grow with additional players, expanded outreach, the regular appearance of major concertizing artists, a series of FM broadcasts, and a diversification of repertoire. Autori resigned in the spring of 1945 and closed his tenure by conducting the Buffalo premiere of Copland's Lincoln Portrait with Carl Sandburg as narrator.

=== William Steinberg era ===
Cameron Baird (the chairman of the UB Music Department) received a recommendation from Arturo Toscanini of the NBC Symphony that its associate conductor, William Steinberg, would be suitable for the job.

The Steinberg era of the BPO had many changes in orchestra personnel, including the beginning of an influx of European musicians who had sought new lives and careers here in the United States just after World War II. Their presence served to define a distinctly European sound that began during the late 40s and continued throughout the 50s and well beyond. The BPO's first commercial recording, the Leningrad Symphony No.7 by Shostakovich, was released on the Musicraft label during this period. Several of the orchestra's performances were recorded for broadcast on the NBC radio network, beginning in 1947, and currently preserved in the BPO Archive and at the Library of Congress.

=== Krips, Foss, and Art Park ===
Steinberg resigned in 1952 to take over the Pittsburgh Symphony. Josef Krips, the former music director of the Vienna State Opera and London Symphony Orchestra was then chosen to lead the orchestra. The Krips era witnessed a major expansion in the length of the season and the number of musicians employed as well as the re-initiation of major tours in the eastern United States and Canada, including the Maritime Provinces.

Krips resigned in 1961 to take over the San Francisco Symphony. Lukas Foss became the new director of BPO.

The orchestra was invited to Carnegie Hall for the first of regular appearances there. Its first major recordings were made on the Nonesuch label featuring the music of Sibelius, Cage, Penderecki, Xenakis, Ruggles and Foss. BPO's first nationwide TV appearances were broadcast on PBS with Stockhousen's Momente and Mussorgsky's Pictures at an Exhibition, after which followed the initiation of several major tours, including two national tours with Arthur Fiedler and his 'Pops' repertoire. Buffalo and the BPO received feature coverage in Life Magazine. In 1970 maestro Foss shared the dais with Governor Nelson Rockefeller at the groundbreaking of Artpark, the permanent summer home of the BPO.

=== 1971 – Present ===
When Foss resigned to take on the Jerusalem Symphony in 1971, he was followed by Michael Tilson Thomas. Over the next several seasons with Thomas, the orchestra made two Columbia recordings and toured regularly, with frequent appearances in Carnegie Hall, including a gala special with Sarah Vaughan, and performances in Boston's Symphony Hall and Washington's Kennedy Center. In July 1974, Thomas also presided over the BPO dedication concert at Art Park as the orchestra's intended summer home. Thomas resigned in 1978 after accepting an appointment with the Los Angeles Philharmonic.

In 1979, Julius Rudel, the former maestro of the New York City Opera, became the music director. Though faced with many financial constraints, Rudel's tenure was marked with emphasis on the classical repertoire as well as gala performances with Beverly Sills and Plácido Domingo. Rudel also took the BPO on a West Coast tour and made a commemorative recording with CBS Masterworks of music for the holiday season.

Rudel's departure in the spring of 1984 was followed by the appointment of Semyon Bychkov, who had been the BPO's assistant conductor for the previous three seasons. Bychkov announced that the BPO would make its first tour of Europe in addition to directing the BPO's 50th anniversary season and making a commemorative recording featuring Roberta Peters of the Metropolitan Opera. The 1988 European tour consisted of performances at Musikvereinssaal in Vienna, as well as concerts in Geneva, Zurich, Milan, and Frankfurt and other venues in Germany and Switzerland.

Bychkov resigned in 1989 to take over the Orchestre de Paris, with Chilean maestro Maximiano Valdes replacing him as music director.

In 1998 JoAnn Falletta was appointed as the new maestro, becoming the first woman named as the music director of a major U.S. symphony orchestra. Under her direction, the orchestra reinitiated a series of broadcasts on public radio and returned to Carnegie Hall in 2004 and 2013 as part of Spring for Music. Falletta led the orchestra on numerous multi-city tours of Florida, at the Saratoga Performing Arts Center in 2012, and in 2018 led a five-city tour of Poland at the invitation of the Ludwig van Beethoven Easter Festival in Warsaw. Soloists who have appeared with the BPO under maestro Falletta include Van Cliburn, Renée Fleming, Yo-Yo Ma, Anne-Sophie Mutter, Joshua Bell, and Midori. The BPO has become one of the most often played orchestras on Performance Today, with concerts broadcast in over 200 cities.

John Morris Russell is the Principal Pops Conductor. Previous pops conductors include Doc Severinsen, the resident pops conductor in the 1990s, and Marvin Hamlisch, best known for his Pulitzer Prize-winning musical, A Chorus Line.

== Music directors ==
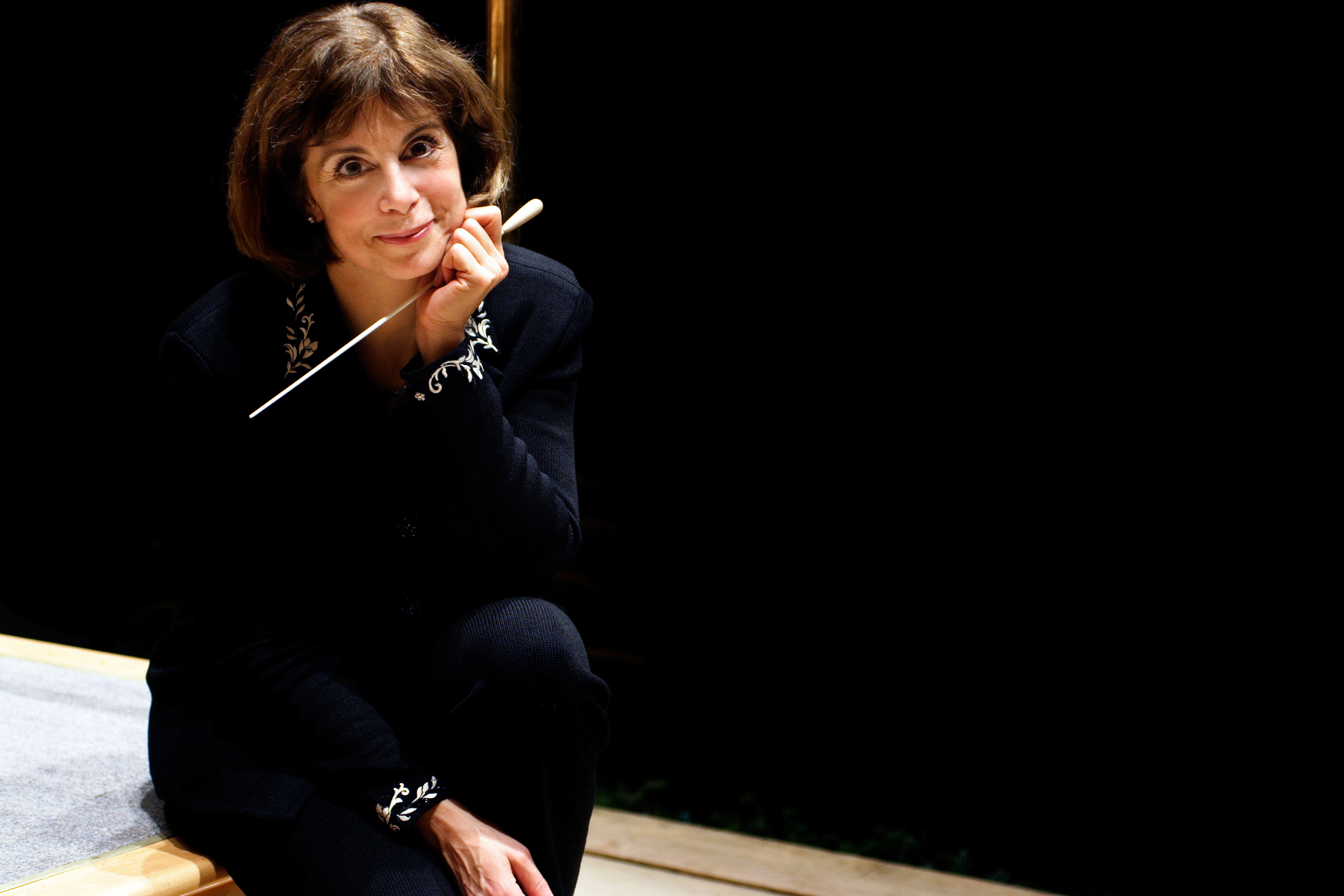
JoAnn Falletta has served as music director of the BPO since 1999

- Lajos Shuk (1935–1936)
- Franco Autori (1936–1945)
- William Steinberg (1945–1952)
- Izler Solomon (1952–1953, conductor-in-residence)
- Josef Krips (1954–1963)
- Lukas Foss (1963–1971)
- Michael Tilson Thomas (1971–1979)
- Julius Rudel (1979–1985)
- Semyon Bychkov (1985–1989)
- Maximiano Valdes (1989–1998)
- JoAnn Falletta (1999–present)

== Recordings ==
The orchestra has recorded extensively. Under Steinberg, the BPO released a critically acclaimed first commercial recording: Dmitri Shostakovich's Seventh Symphony. With Falletta, the BPO also has issued more than 50 new albums, including twenty on Naxos Records, and has specialized in recording lesser-known European works from the late 19th and early 20th century. Soloists who have appeared with the BPO under maestro Falletta include Van Cliburn, Renée Fleming, Yo-Yo Ma, Anne-Sophie Mutter, Joshua Bell, and Midori. BPO recordings are frequently featured on the Sirius radio network and it has been featured three times on NPR's From the Top.

Under Falletta's directorship, the BPO's recording program has focused on American composers for the Naxos label, including Frederick Converse, Charles Tomlinson Griffes, and contemporary compositions, including the first commercial recording of John Corigliano's Mr. Tambourine Man which received two GRAMMY Awards in 2009. The orchestra won another GRAMMY in 2021 for its recording of Richard Danielpour's "The Passion of Yeshua." Falletta also founded a house label, Beau Fleuve, on which the orchestra has released albums including "Built For Buffalo," featuring commissioned works, and "Carnivals and Fairy Tales," a children's album narrated by Falletta and Robby Takac of the Buffalo-based band Goo Goo Dolls. The orchestra can also be heard in the soundtrack to Woody Allen's Manhattan.
