= I May Be Wrong (but I Think You're Wonderful) =

1929 song by Henry Sullivan and Harry Ruskin

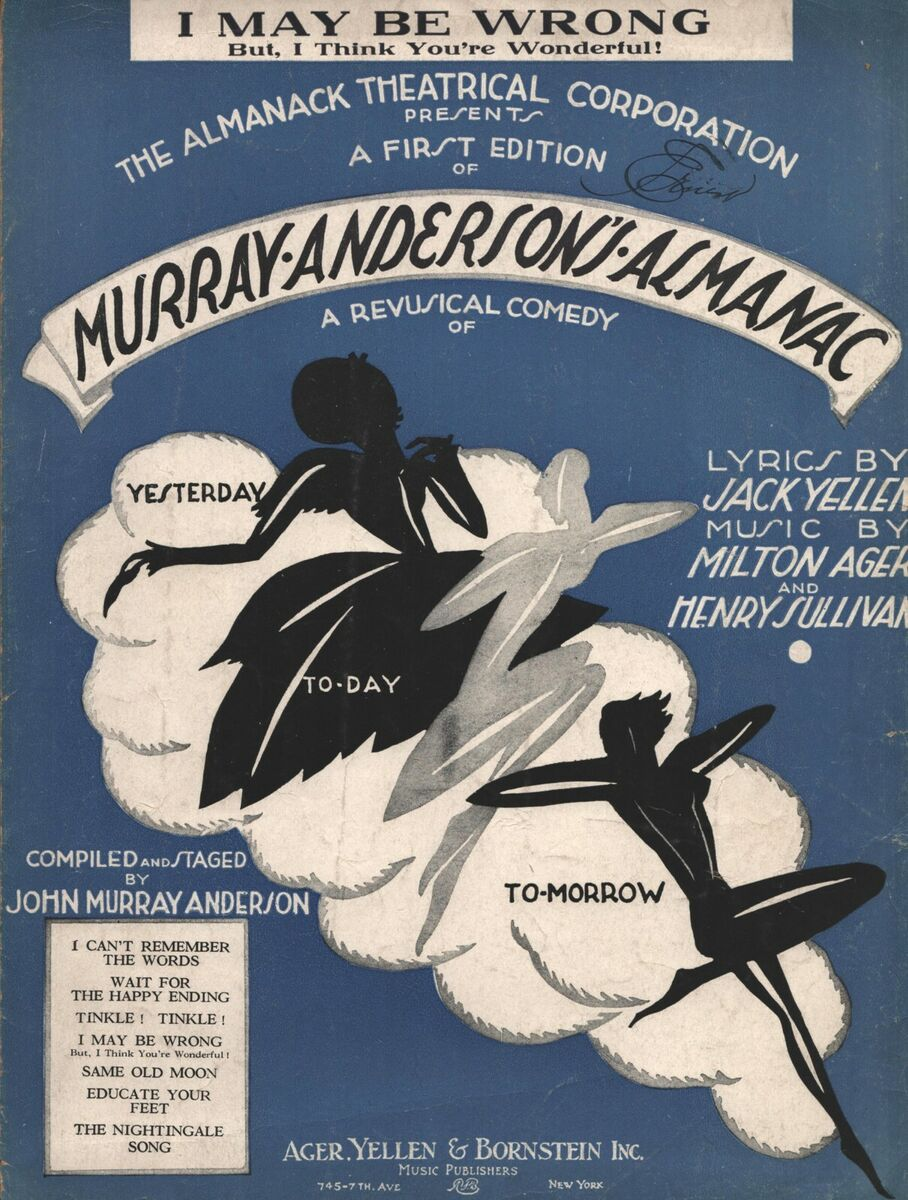
- Sheet music cover, 1929

Song
- Published: 1929; by Ager, Yellen, and Bornstein, Inc.
- Composer: Henry Sullivan
- Lyricist: Harry Ruskin

"I May Be Wrong (but I Think You're Wonderful)" is a popular song with music by Henry Sullivan, lyrics by Harry Ruskin, and arranged by Dan Daugherty. It was original published by Ager, Yellen, and Bornstein, Inc. in 1929, to be included in the musical revue Murray Anderson's Almanac, which ran for 69 performances at Erlanger's Theatre on Broadway in 1929. It is said that the song was written on-demand for John Murray Anderson.

In his book, Encyclopedia of the Musical Theatre, Stanley Green reported that "because Anderson believed that the best songs are created under pressure, he locked Sullivan in a room with a piano and threatened to keep him in there until he came up with a potential hit. When finally liberated, the composer had written the most successful number in the show. The song was introduced by singer Jimmy Savo in the revue."

== Other recordings ==
- High Hatters (vocal: Frank Luther) – recorded August 23, 1929 for Victor Records (catalog No. 22105)
- Al Katz and His Kittens, recorded August 30, 1929 for Columbia Records, catalog No. 1971D
- Libby Holman, recorded September 1929 for Brunswick Records, catalog No. 4506
- Red Nichols and His Five Pennies (with vocal chorus), recorded on October 24, 1929, for Brunswick Records, catalog. No. 4500
- Gladys Rice and Franklyn Baur, recorded November 26, 1929 for Victor Records, catalog. No. 22226
- Judy Garland – performed the song on Command Performance #134, August 19, 1944
- Dinah Shore – a single release for Columbia Records, catalog No. 37140. (1946)
- Frankie Laine released a version in 1946, backed by Milton Delugg and the Swing Wing for Mercury Records, catalog No. 1205A
- Doris Day with Harry James – included in the album Young Man with a Horn, released on Columbia CL-6106 in 1950
- Frank Rosolino released a version in 1956, on his I Play Trombone album
- The Four Freshmen – included in their album Four Freshmen and Five Saxes (1957)
- Bing Crosby and Rosemary Clooney recorded the song in 1958 for use on their radio show and it was subsequently included in the CD Bing & Rosie – The Crosby-Clooney Radio Sessions released in 2010
- Perry Como – included in his album Saturday Night with Mr. C (1958)
- The Mills Brothers – included in the album Count Basie & The Mills Brothers – The Board of Directors (1967)
- Ray Charles recorded a version for his album Volcanic Action of My Soul (1971)
- Ella Fitzgerald and Joe Pass recorded it on their album Speak Love (1983)
- June Christy – A Friendly Session, Vol. 2 (1999)

== Film appearances ==
- 1943: Swingtime Johnny – performed by The Andrews Sisters
- 1947: The Unsuspected – briefly sung by Audrey Totter
- 1948: Wallflower – played by the band at the dance and sung by Janis Paige
- 1949: You're My Everything – sung and danced by Dan Dailey
- 1950: Young Man with a Horn – sung by Doris Day
- 1951: Sunny Side of the Street – sung by Frankie Laine and Toni Arden
- 1953: She's Back on Broadway – performed by Gene Nelson
- 1961: Claudelle Inglish – played at the Senior Dance
