= Anna Wynne O'Ryan =

American librettist

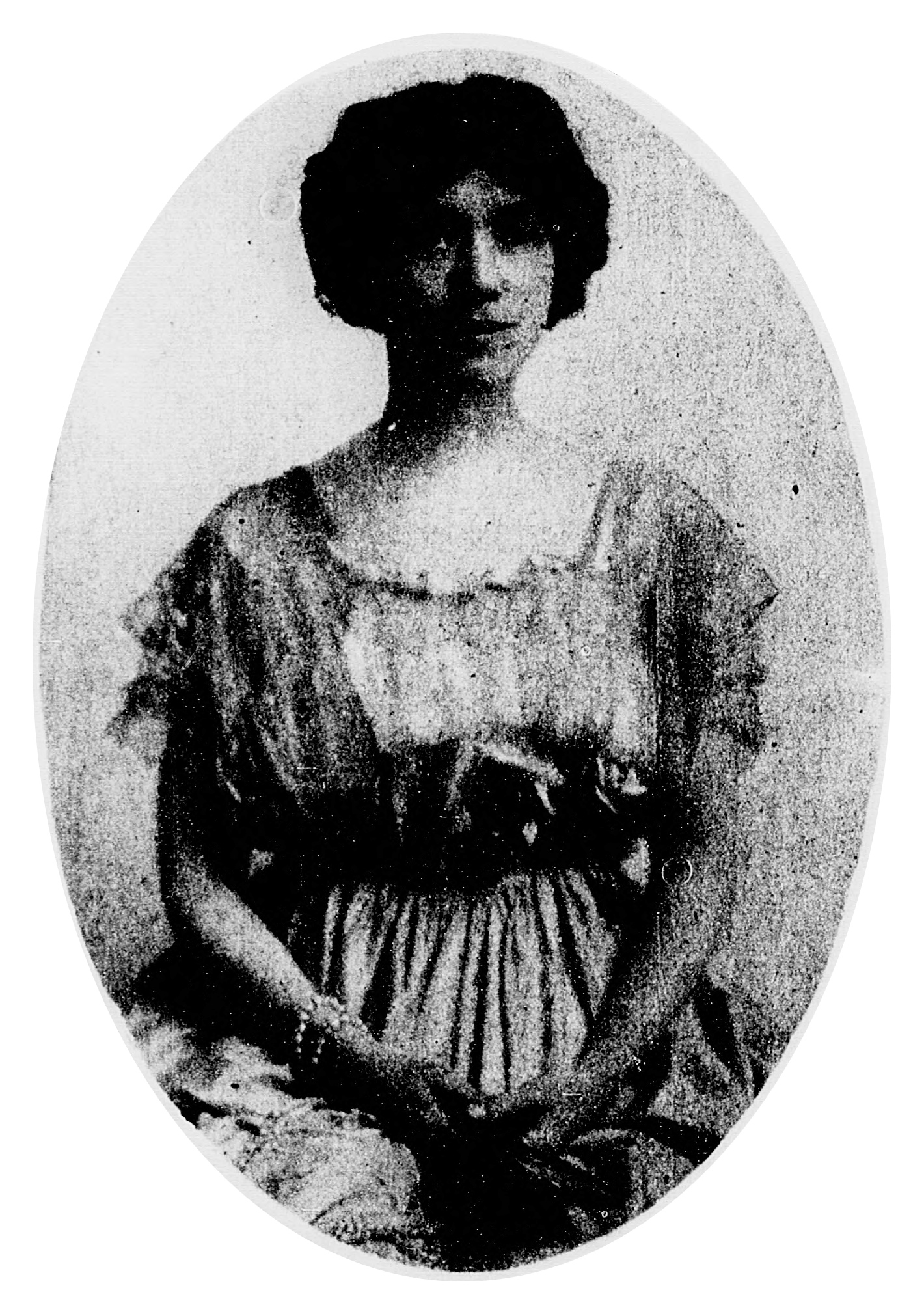
Anna Wynne O'Ryan

Anna Wynne O'Ryan (1877 – July 1928) was an American librettist. She collaborated on several plays, including the 1922 musical, Just Because. According to Ben West at the Library of Congress, the play "may well have been the first full-length Broadway musical authored entirely by women".

== Early life ==
O'Ryan was born in 1877 in New York to parents Anna and Francis O'Ryan. Her father was an immigrant from Ireland who taught "the classics" at Seton Hall University. She had a brother named John F. O'Ryan, who became a commander of the 27th Division during World War I.

O'Ryan studied Shakespeare. She also wrote books and taught "literary subjects". She was a member of the New York Pen and Brush Players, a group of writers and painters.

== Career ==
She directed the Prairie Street Players in Rochester. She and her father wrote Plays from American History.

O'Ryan collaborated with Helen Smith Woodruff, Madelyn Sheppard, and Annelu Burns on the 1922 musical, Just Because. She wrote the book for the original version of the musical that was copyrighted in 1919. While the play was being readied for production in New York, O'Ryan rewrote parts of the book, and rewrote the comedy lyrics on behalf of the lyricist, Annelu Burns. After theater productions took place, the musical received praise.

In 1925, O'Ryan married Colonel James Crooke McLeer in New York City. About a year after their marriage, her husband died. Around July 14, 1928, Anna died with her mother in their home in New York, from asphyxiation due to a gas stove. Their bodies were found about four days after their deaths by her brother.

== Selected works ==
- The Courtship of Then and Now
- The Courtship of Then, Now, and Tomorrow
- The Birth of a Frankenstein (1915)
- The Universal Mother (c. 1918) one-act play, co-written by John Murray Anderson
- A Case of Kidnapping (c. 1920)
- Whats in a Name? (c. 1920), musical comedy, co-written by John Murray Anderson and Jack Yellen
- Just Because (1922), musical, co-written by Helen S. Woodruff and Madelyn Sheppard
- A Moving Picture (c. 1924), burlesque
- The Fool and the Blind Man (c. 1926), play
