= Just Because (musical) =

1922 musical

Just Because was a 1922 musical. According to Ben West at the Library of Congress, the play "may well have been the first full-length Broadway musical authored entirely by women". The musical is set in the suburbs of New York City.

== Background ==
The original version of the musical was copyrighted in 1919, with the book written by Anna Wynne O'Ryan, the lyrics written by Annelu Burns and the musical score composed by Madelyn Sheppard. The title of the play was named by Burns. While the play was being prepared for production in New York, O'Ryan rewrote parts of the book and rewrote the comedy lyrics on behalf of Burns, who was staying in the Southern United States and was unable to return to New York City. During production preparation, Helen Smith Woodruff helped to organize funding for the show.

Still unable to return before the New York production, Burns sold her rights of the musical to Woodruff. Songs sold to Woodruff that were written by Burns included "Love-Just Simply Love", "It's Hard to Be A Lady All The Time", "I'll Name My Dolly for You" and "A Wedding is a Mournful Thing Unless it is Your Own". According to an article in The Montgomery Advertiser, credit about who wrote the book and lyrics to the musical were incorrectly reported. In the 1922 version of the musical, Woodruff was credited for writing the lyrics and collaborating on the book.

The play's debut was scheduled to be in Northampton, Massachusetts, on February 24, 1922. Just Because was premiered on March 22, 1922, at the Earl Carroll Theatre. It closed on April 29, 1922.

== Critical reception ==
After theater productions took place, the musical received praise.
