= John Murray Anderson's Almanac =

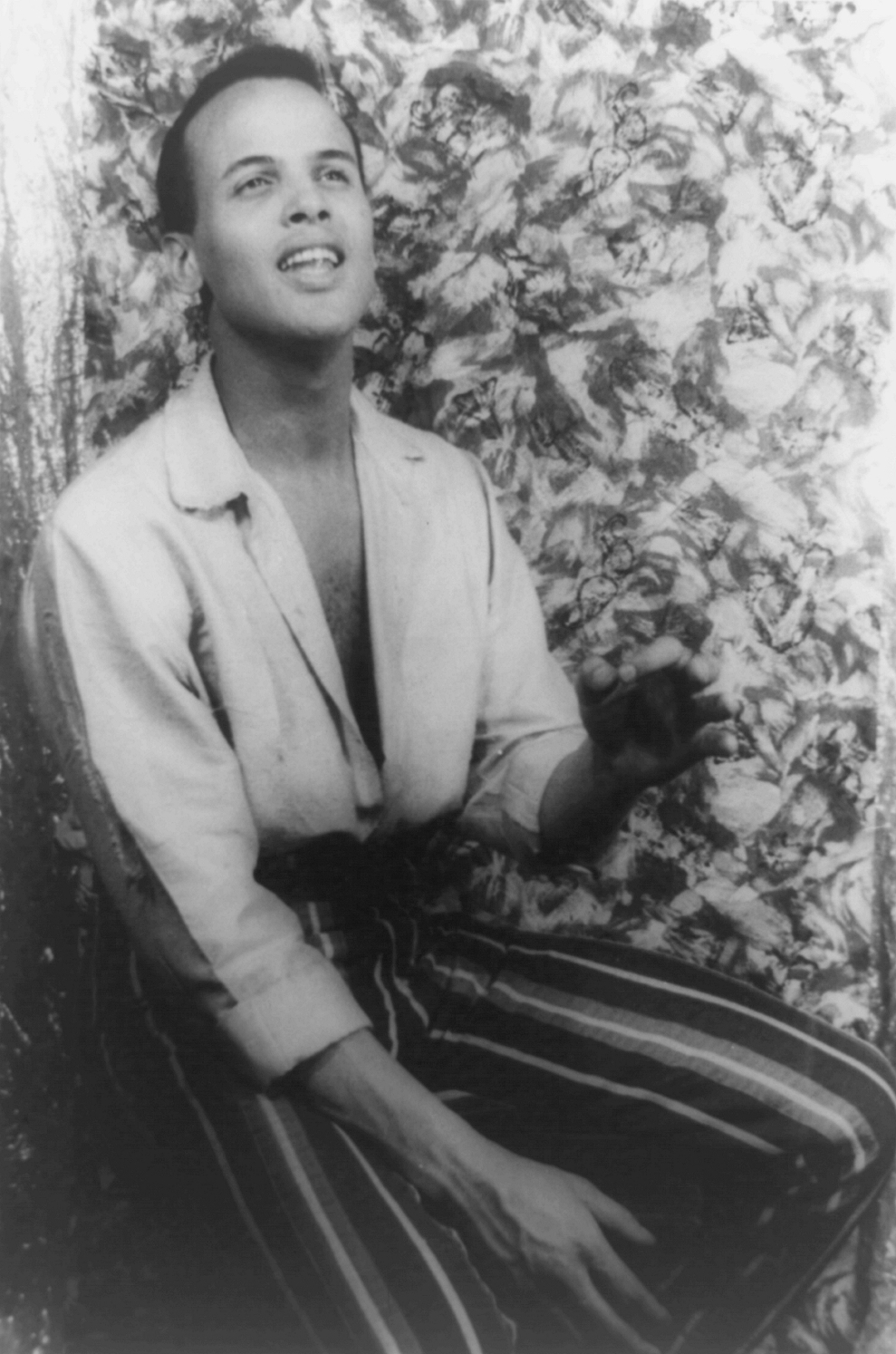
- Harry Belafonte in John Murray Anderson's Almanac on Broadway, photographed by Carl Van Vechten, 1954
- Music: Richard Adler and Jerry Ross; Cy Coleman; Michael Grace; Joseph McCarthy; Henry Sullivan; John Rox; Bart Howard; Harry Belafonte; Charles Zwar
- Lyrics: Richard Adler and Jerry Ross; Cy Coleman; Michael Grace; Joseph McCarthy; Henry Sullivan; John Rox; Bart Howard; Harry Belafonte; Charles Zwar
- Book: various

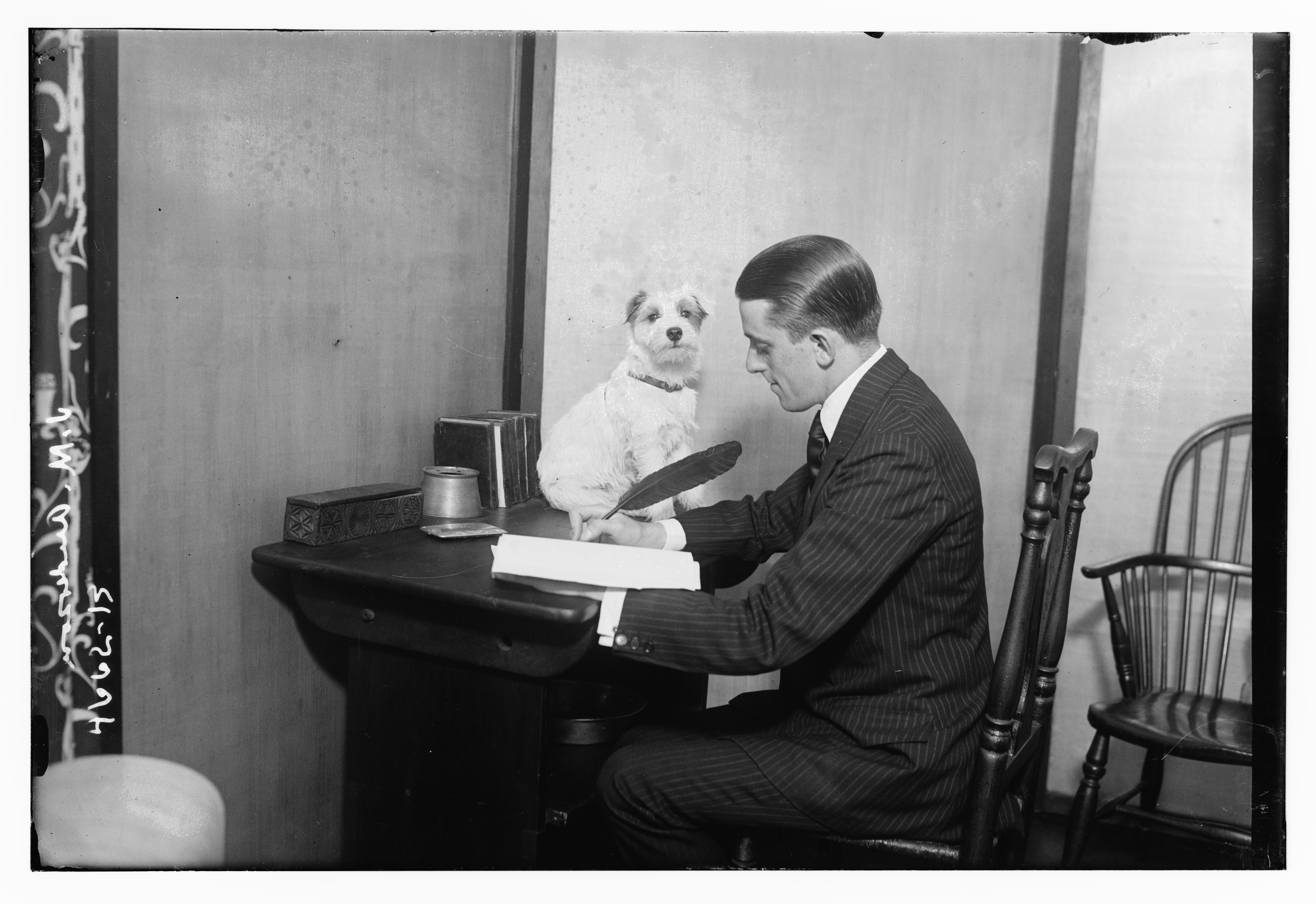
John Murray Anderson (1918)

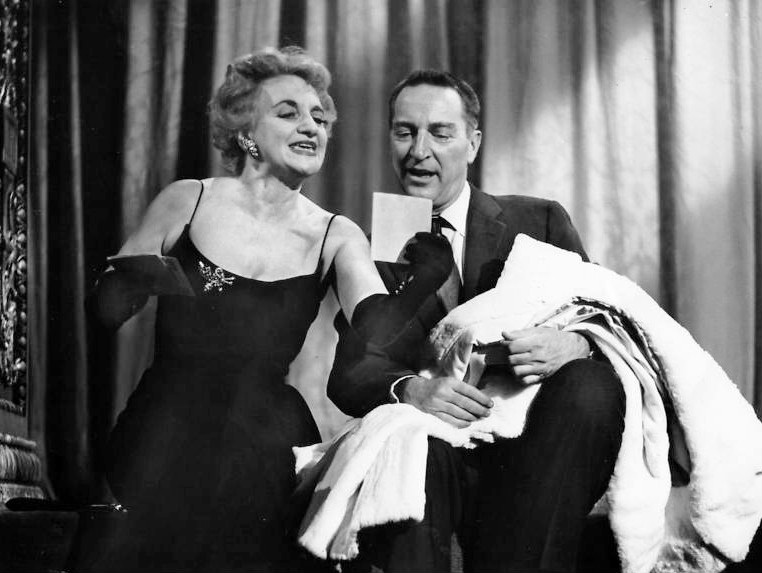
Hermione Gingold in publicity image for I've Got a Secret, began her career on Broadway as well as in US cinema with John Murray Anderson's Almanac.

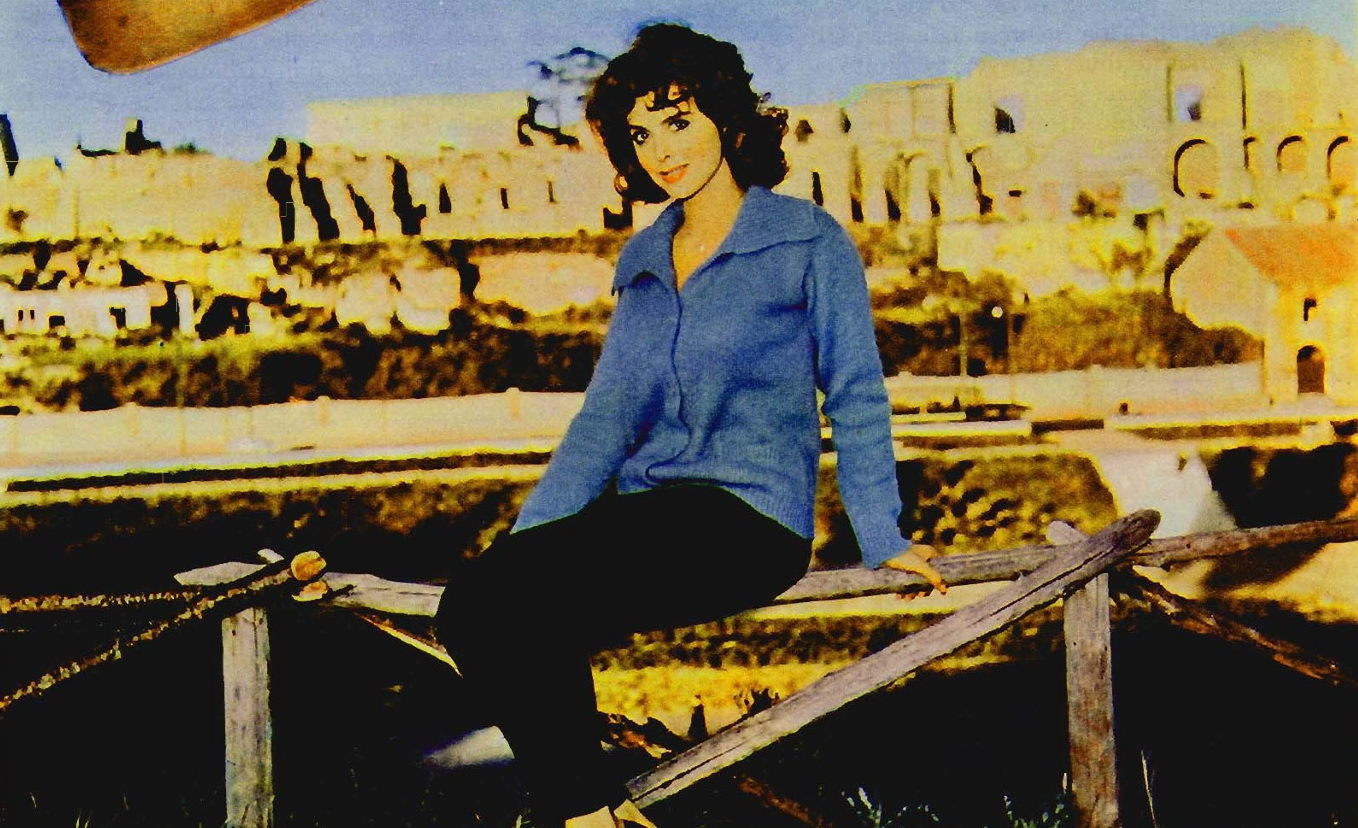
Tina Louise would go on to be in the Broadway show Will Success Spoil Rock Hunter? (1955)

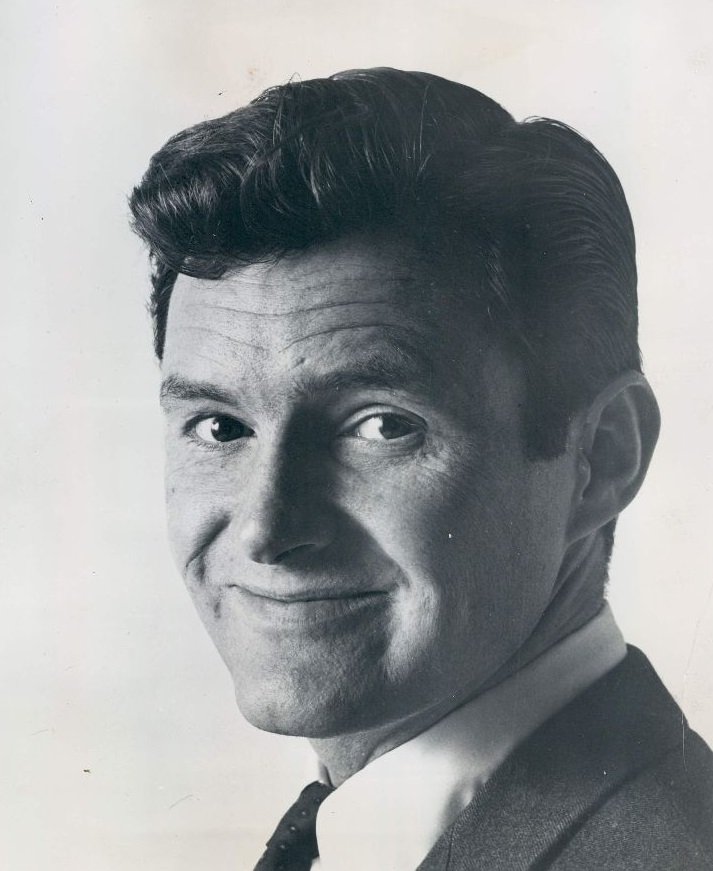
Orson Bean won the 1954 Theater World Award for his work on the show. He would later go on to be in the Broadway show Will Success Spoil Rock Hunter? (1955)

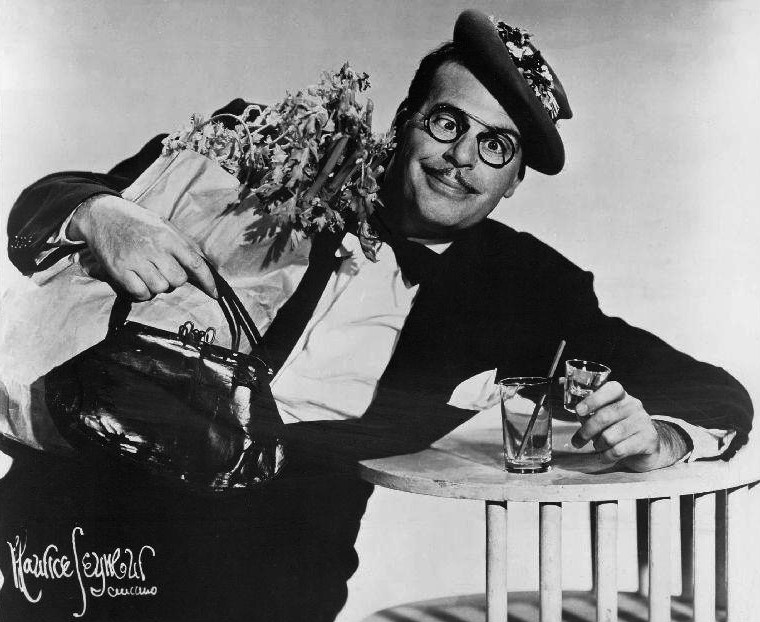
Billy De Wolfe won the 1954 Donaldson Award for Best Actor Debut in a Musical (See Awards). He would go on to be in the Broadway show Ziegfeld Follies of 1957.

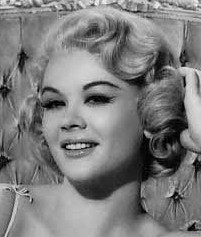
Monique van Vooren (1957) would go on to be in Mayerling, an episode of television series Producers Showcase (1957). The episode was later screened in Europe as a film.

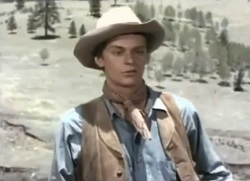
Carleton Carpenter in scene from the film Vengeance Valley (1951). He would later go on to be in the Broadway show Hotel Paradiso (1957).

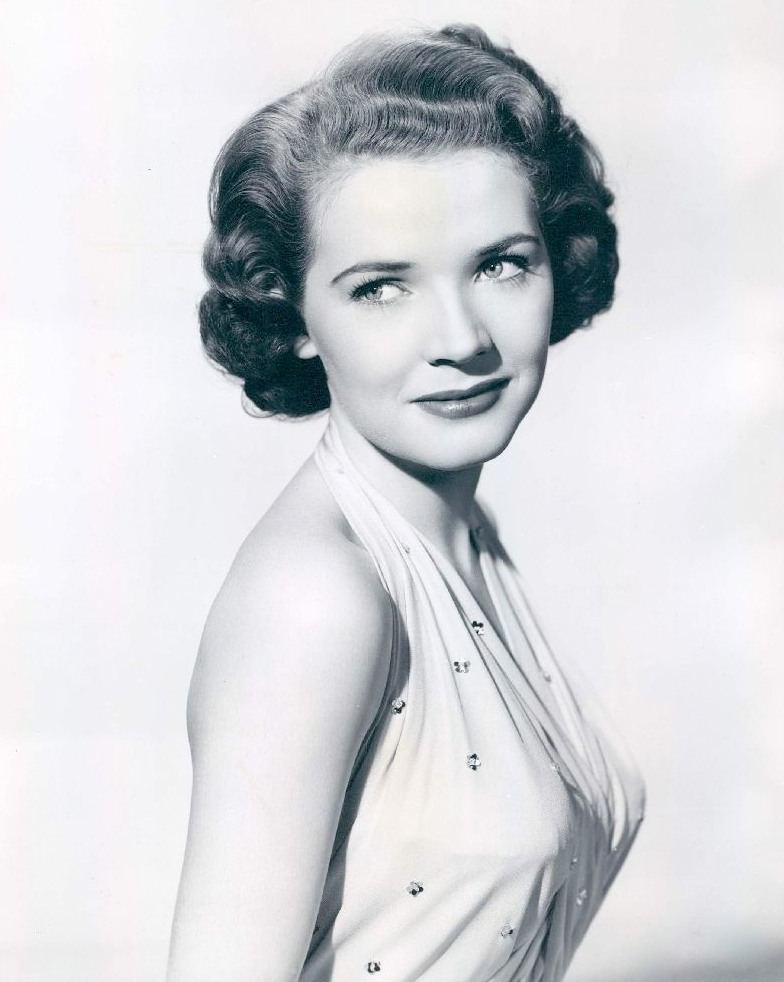
Polly Bergen in 1953 photo. She would go on to win a 1956 Emmy Award for her portrayal of jazz singer and actress Helen Morgan in Helen Morgan (Playhouse 90).

John Murray Anderson's Almanac is a musical revue, featuring the music of the songwriting team of Richard Adler and Jerry Ross, as well as other composers. It was conceived by John Murray Anderson. An earlier version of the show had been produced in 1929 with the title Murray Anderson's Almanac. The earlier production included Henry Sullivan for composing the music and Noël Coward as part of the script writing team. Sullivan would go on to write music for the 1953 production mentioned here. The full title for the show was John Murray Anderson's Almanac: A Musical Harlequinade.

== Productions ==
John Murray Anderson's Almanac began with a tryout at the Shubert Theatre in Boston from November 5, 1953 to December 5, 1953.

The production opened on Broadway on December 10, 1953, at the Imperial Theatre, New York City, and closed on June 26, 1954, after 229 performances. The revue was conceived and staged by John Murray Anderson, with sketches directed by Cyril Ritchard and dances and musical numbers staged by Donald Saddler. Scenic design was by Raoul Pene Du Bois. The revue starred Harry Belafonte, Hermione Gingold, Polly Bergen, Orson Bean, Carleton Carpenter, Tina Louise, Monique van Vooren, and Billy DeWolfe.

Richard Adler and Jerry Ross provided the majority of the songs for the show. They later wrote songs for The Pajama Game and Damn Yankees over the course of the next two years (1954-1955). John Murray Anderson's Almanac was the first Broadway show for each of them. The producers of the show were Michael Grace (who was also one of the lyricists as well), Stanley Gilky, and Harry Rigby.

The sketches were written by Jean Kerr, Sumner Lock-Elliot, Arthur Macrae, Herbert Farjeon, and Billy K. Wells. Lauri Wylie's "Dinner for One" was posthumously included; Wylie had died in 1951.

The show was a modernized version of Murray Anderson's Almanac (1929). The 1929 version was directed by Harry Ruskin, William Hollbrook, and John Murray Anderson of this 1953 version.

Henry Sullivan composed music for both shows. A few years before the 1953 show, John Murray Anderson and Henry Sullivan composed the music for the off-camera scenes in the film The Greatest Show on Earth (1952).

== Songs ==
Act 1

- Prologue: Harlequinade – Pierrette Ensemble, Jimmy Albright, Lee Becker, Hank Brunjes, Carleton Carpenter, Ronald Cecill, Dean Crane, Nanci Crompton, Imelda De Martin, Dorothy Dushock, James Jewell, Gerard Leavitt, Celia Lipton, Greb Lober, Ralph McWilliams, Harry Mimmo, Ilona Murai, Margot Myers, Gwen Neilson, Gloria Smith
- Queen for a Day
- My Cousin Who? – Billy DeWolfe, Jimmy Albright, Ronald Cecill, Dean Crane, Celia Lipton, Ralph McWilliams, Illona Murai, Gwen Neilson, Kenneth Urmston, Toni Wheelis
- You're So Much a Part of Me – Carleton Carpenter, Elaine Dunn
- I Dare to Dream – Polly Bergen
- The Cello – Hermione Gingold
- Mark Twain – Harry Belafonte, Millard Thomas (Guitarist)
- The Nightingale and the Rose – Jimmy Albright, Hank Brunjes, Ronald Cecill, James Jewell, Gerard Leavitt, Celia Lipton, Greb Lober, Tina Louise, Ralph McWilliams, Margot Myers, Gwen Neilson, George Reeder, Siri, Gloria Smith, Monique Van Vooren
- My Love is a Wanderer
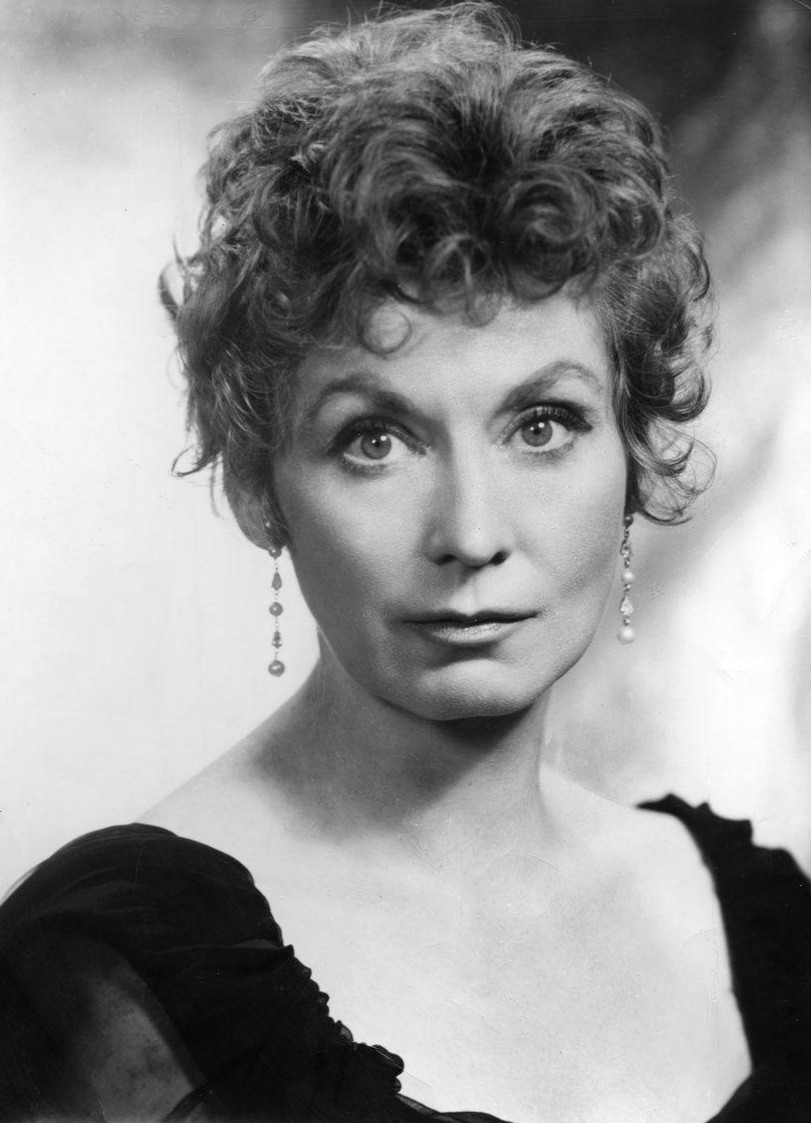
- Kay Medford, shown here in an image from 1964, would go on to win the 1954 Theater World Award for Lullaby (1954) and the 1964 Tony Award for Best Featured Actress in a Musical for her work in Funny Girl (1964).
  The Pan Alley (Mammy Songs, Rhythm Songs, Torch Songs, Patriotic Songs)– Lee Becker, Carleton Carpenter, Ronald Cecill, Dean Crane, Imelda De Martin, Dorothy Dushock, Jay Harnick, Larry Kert, Bob Kole, Gerard Leavitt, Greb Lober, Ralph McWilliams, Illona Murai, Margot Myers, George Reeder, Gloria Smith, Kenneth Urmston
- Hope you Come Back – Polly Bergen, Billy DeWolfe, Hermione Gingold, Nanci Crompton, Elaine Dunn, Kay Medford

Act 2

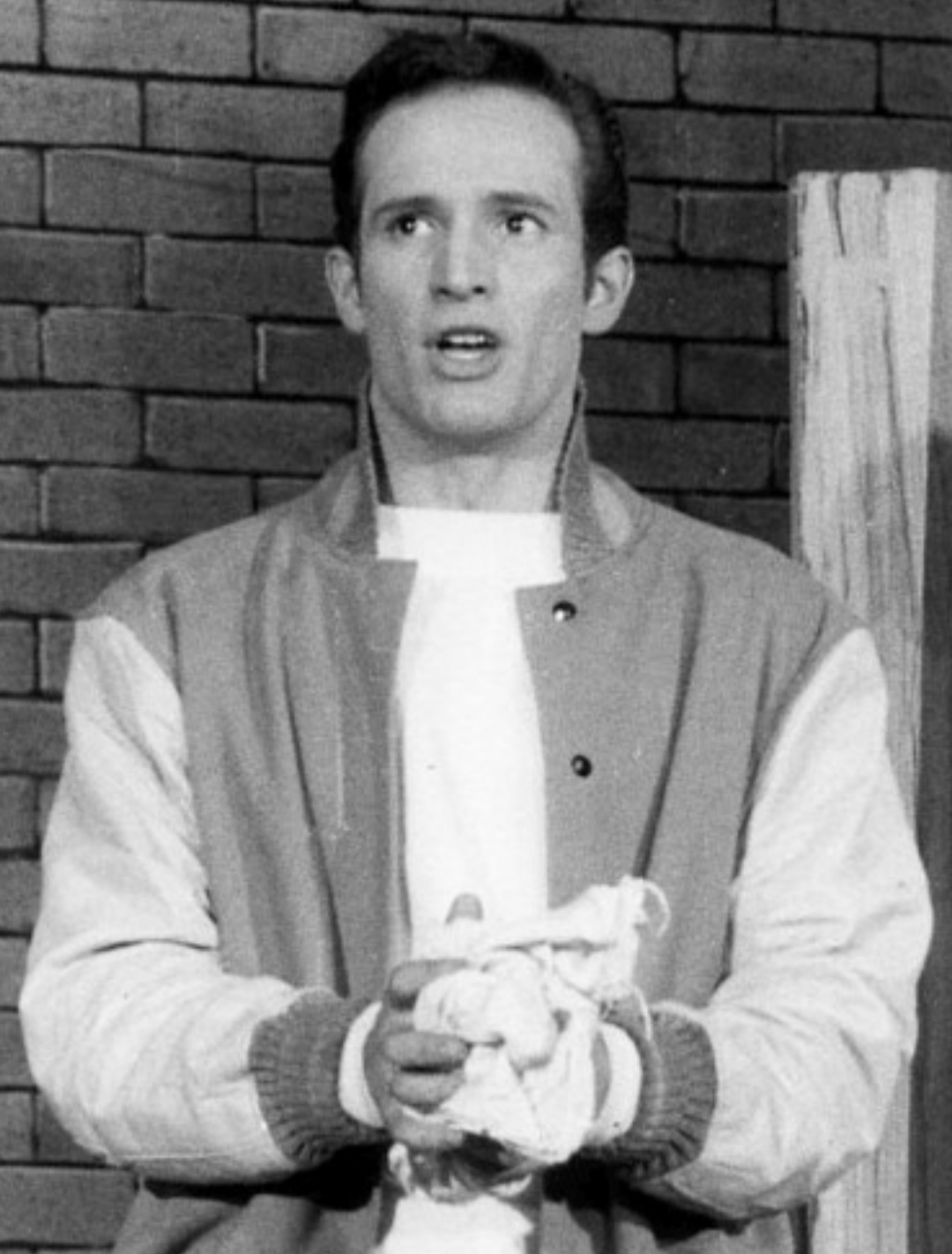
- Larry Kert would later go on to be Tony in West Side Story (1957). Seen in image from the 1957 Broadway musical.
  If Every Month Were June – Celia Lipton
- Which Witch – Hermione Gingold (song by Charles Zwar)
- La Loge – Polly Bergen, Jay Harnick
- Acorn in the Meadow – Harry Belafonte
- When Am I Going to Meet your Mother? – Carleton Carpenter, Elaine Dunn, singer/dancer
- Dinner for One – Billy DeWolfe, Hermione Gingold
- Hold 'em Joe – Harry Belafonte, Colleen Hutchins, Illona Murai, George Reeder, Gloria Smith, and Monique Van Vooren (dancers) (song by Harry Thomas)
- La Pistachio – Billy DeWolfe, Kay Medford

== Musical works ==
Title	Year (Creation/ Publication)	Lyricist	Composer
You're so much a part of me	1951		Richard Adler and Jerry Ross
Fini	1953		Richard Adler and Jerry Ross
The earth and sky	1953		John Rox
Acorn in the meadow	1953		Richard Adler and Jerry Ross
Anema e core: With all my heart and soul.	1954	Mann Curtis Harry Akst Tito Manlio	Salve D'Esposito
Mark Twain	1954		Harry Belafonte
Hold 'em Joe	1954		Harry Belafonte

== Critical response ==
Brooks Atkinson reviewing for The New York Times called it a "bright and brilliant show", and had special praise for Hermione Gingold, who "gives herself artistic airs that are hilarious", and Harry Belafonte's "Mark Twain" performance, "expository style as a singer and actor makes it the 'Almanac's' high point in theatrical artistry." However, Atkinson wrote that the "Almanac is more distinguished for its humor. Jean Kerr...has written a gruesome jest about horror literature, 'My Cousin Who?'"

== Awards ==
Theater Awards Awarded to Cast Members
Actor	Award	Category	Year
Harry Belafonte	Tony Award	Tony Award for Best Featured Actor in a Musical	1954
Harry Belafonte	Theater World Awards	Award Winner	1954
Harry Belafonte	Donaldson Award	Best Featured Actor in a Musical	1954
Orson Bean	Theater World Awards	Award Winner	1954
Billy De Wolfe	Donaldson Awards	Best Actor Debut in a Musical	1954
Hermione Gingold	Donaldson Awards	Best Actress Debut in a Musical	1954

Note: Hermione Gingold would go on to make a cameo in the film Around the World in 80 Days (1956).
