= Thumbs Up! (musical) =

- Sheet Music Cover
- Music: James Hanley and Henry Sullivan
- Lyrics: Ballard MacDonald and Earle Crooker
- Book: H. I. Phillips, Harold Atteridge, and Alan Baxter

Thumbs Up! is a musical revue in two acts, with book by H. I. Phillips, Harold Atteridge, and Alan Baxter. The show had songs with lyrics by Ballard MacDonald and Earle Crooker and music by James F. Hanley and Henry Sullivan. Additional lyrics by Karl Stark, Ira Gershwin, John Murray Anderson, Irving Caesar, Jean Herbert, and Vernon Duke and additional music by Vernon Duke, Gerald Marks, and Steve Child. The show was produced by Eddie Dowling at the St. James Theatre. The show introduced two standards, "Zing! Went the Strings of My Heart" and "Autumn in New York."

The revue opened on December 27, 1934. The production was staged by John Murray Anderson and directed by Edward Clarke Lilley. It was choreographed by Robert Alton, scenic design by Ted Weidhaas, James Reynolds, and Raoul Pene Du Bois, and costume design by James Reynolds, Raoul Pene Du Bois, Thomas Becher and James Morcom. The musical director was Gene Salzer. The music was by James Hanley and Henry Sullivan, and orchestrated by Hans Spialek, Conrad Salinger and David Raksin. It ran for 156 performances, closing on May 11, 1935. The cast headlined Eddie Dowling, Clark & McCullough, Ray Dooley, Paul Draper, Pickens Sisters, Rose King, Bob Lawrence, Hugh Cameron, and Ruben Garcia.

Being a revue, there's very little in the way of plot. Burns Mantle reported that the show “was both cleaner and brighter than most of the Broadway output” that season. “It included the missus, Sister Ray Dooley, the surviving member of that Dooley family which made life a lot brighter for thousands of playgoers during the early years of the century.” The New York Times said: “It is so good-looking and it is played with such spirit that you are surprised to discover that it does not live up to the promise of the names in the program.”

== Songs ==
Act 1

- “Beautiful Night” (music by James Hanley, lyrics by Karl Stark)
- “Zing! Went the Strings of My Heart” (music and lyrics by James Hanley)
- “Words Without Music” (music by Vernon Duke, lyrics by Ira Gershwin)
- “Lily Belle May June” (music by Henry Sullivan, lyrics by Earle Crooker)
- “Flamenco” (music by Henry Sullivan, lyrics by Earle Crooker)
- “Eileen Avourneen” (music by Henry Sullivan, lyrics by John Murray Anderson)
- “The Torch Singer” (music by Henry Sullivan, lyrics by Earle Crooker)
- “My Arab Complex” (music by James Hanley, lyrics by Ballard MacDonald)
- “Soldier of Love” (music by Gerald Marks, lyrics by Irving Caesar)

Act 2

- “Color Blind” (music by Henry Sullivan, lyrics by Earle Crooker)
- “Tango Rhythms” (music by Steve Child)
- “Continental Honeymoon” (lyrics by Ballard MacDonald and James Hanley)
- “A Ship’s Concert in the Eighties” (music by Henry Sullivan, lyrics by Earle Crooker)
- “Catherine the Great”
- “Rehearsal Hall” (music by Henry Sullivan)
- “Merrily We Waltz Along” (music by Henry Sullivan, lyrics by Earle Crooker)
- “Gotta See a Man About His Daughter” (music by James Hanley, lyrics by Jean Herbert and Karl Stark)
- “Autumn in New York” (music & lyrics by Vernon Duke)
