= John Rox =

American composer (1907–1957)

- Born: John Arthur Barber; July 21, 1902; Des Moines, Iowa, U.S.
- Died: August 5, 1957 (aged 55); Davis Park, New York, U.S.
- Other name: John Jefferson Herring
- Occupations: Composer and lyricist
- Notable work: It's a Big Wide Wonderful World (1939); I Want a Hippopotamus for Christmas (1953)
- Spouse: Alice Pearce

John Jefferson Rox (born John Arthur Barber; July 21, 1902 – August 5, 1957) was an American composer and lyricist.

He wrote music for Broadway shows and the recording industry. His song "It's a Big Wide Wonderful World" (1939) was used in the soundtrack of multiple films. His holiday tune "I Want a Hippopotamus for Christmas" (1953) was a popular family-entertainment song, originally sung by ten-year-old Gayla Peevey. Many other artists also covered it.

== Early life ==
John Arthur Barber was born on July 21, 1902, in Des Moines, Iowa, the only child of Arthur Grant Barber (1881–1948) and Ina Maureen (Dollie) Brown (1876–1942). His parents were married on September 7, 1901, but eventually divorced. His mother then remarried on April 3, 1907, to Earl Granville Herring, and bore two more sons, Donald Granville Herring and Robert Eugene Herring. Upon her remarriage, her eldest son John Arthur Barber was renamed John Jefferson Herring.

After graduating from Winterset High School, he had attended Drake University in Des Moines and became a member of the Tau Psi fraternity in the early 1920s. Years later, upon entering the music business, John adopted the stage name "John Jefferson Rox".

== Career ==
The first song that he wrote and copyrighted was "Weep No More, Willow" in 1938. The following year, he wrote and copyrighted "It's a Big Wide Wonderful World" (1939). It has been used in the soundtrack of several different films over the span of over fifty years.

The song premiered in All in Fun (1940) on Broadway, of which he was the lyricist for the show. Walter Cassel and Wynn Murray introduced the song. The show had opened at the Majestic Theatre on Broadway and featured Imogene Coca as a cast member.

=== Major films with "It's a Big Wide Wonderful World" in the soundtrack ===
Film title	Year
An Angel Comes to Brooklyn	1945
Rhythm Inn	1951
3 Ring Circus	1954
Sweet Bird of Youth	1962
A Safe Place	1971
Rancho Deluxe	1975
Avalon	1990
Rover Dangerfield	1991

In 1946, he wrote the song "Ridin' Double" for the soundtrack of the 1946 Western film Sioux City Sue starring Gene Autry.

He later wrote "I Want a Hippopotamus for Christmas" (1953) with Peevey singing the original version. It was a popular song with thirty-nine artists having had sung the cover for it.

That same year, he was one of several songwriters and lyricists for the Broadway show John Murray Anderson's Almanac (1953).

The following year, he and fellow songwriter and lyricist from the show, Michael Grace, wrote the song "Let a Little Time Go By" (1954).

In 1956, he and Dean Fuller wrote the music for New Faces of 1956, which premiered at the Ethel Barrymore Theatre on Broadway with Maggie Smith and Jane Connell as cast members.

=== Theatre work ===
Broadway shows
Title	Year	Role
All in Fun	1940	composer and lyricist
John Murray Anderson's Almanac	1953	composer and lyricist
New Faces of 1956	1956	composer

== Personal life ==
In 1948, he married actress Alice Pearce. They had no children. Pearce had portrayed Gladys Kravitz in the 1960s television situation comedy Bewitched.
