= John Barnes Wells =

American singer and composer

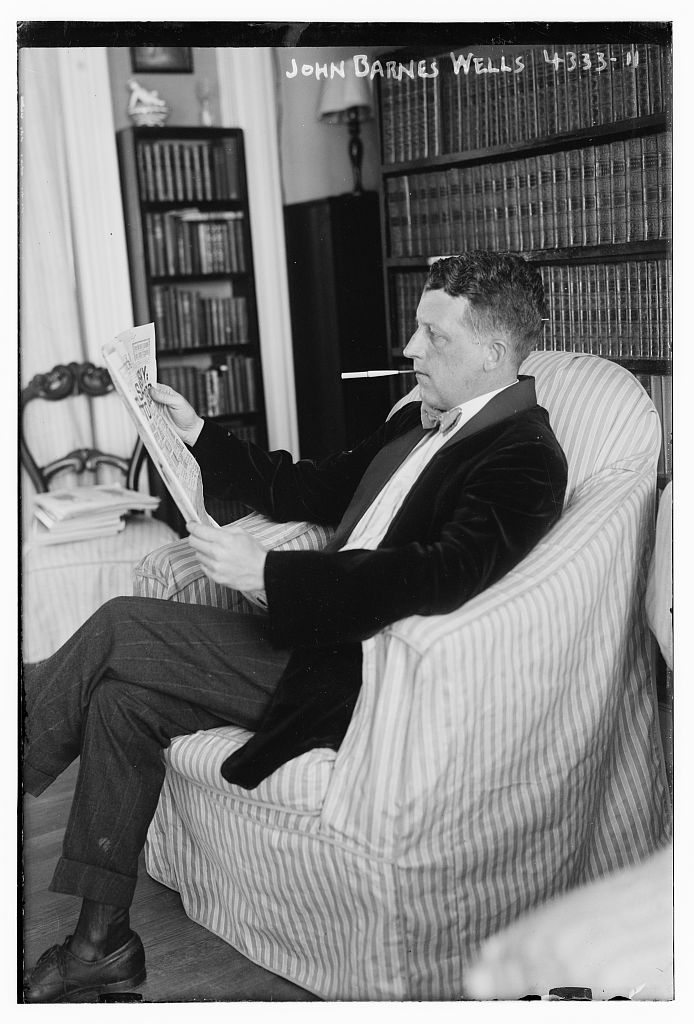
- Wells in 1917 in Manhattan
- Born: October 17, 1880; Ashley, Pennsylvania
- Died: August 8, 1935 (aged 54); Roxbury, New York
- Occupations: Composer, singer

John Barnes "Jack" Wells (October 17, 1880 – August 8, 1935), was an American composer and singer. He sang as a tenor. He was once described as "one of the best known concert singers in New York." A popular singer, Wells was featured on many 78-rpm recordings released in the early 1900s. He starred in the 1903 musical theater production of The Wizard of Oz. One of his final performances was in Uncle Tom's Cabin (1933). He also used the pseudonym William Barnes and composed music under the name Jack Wells.

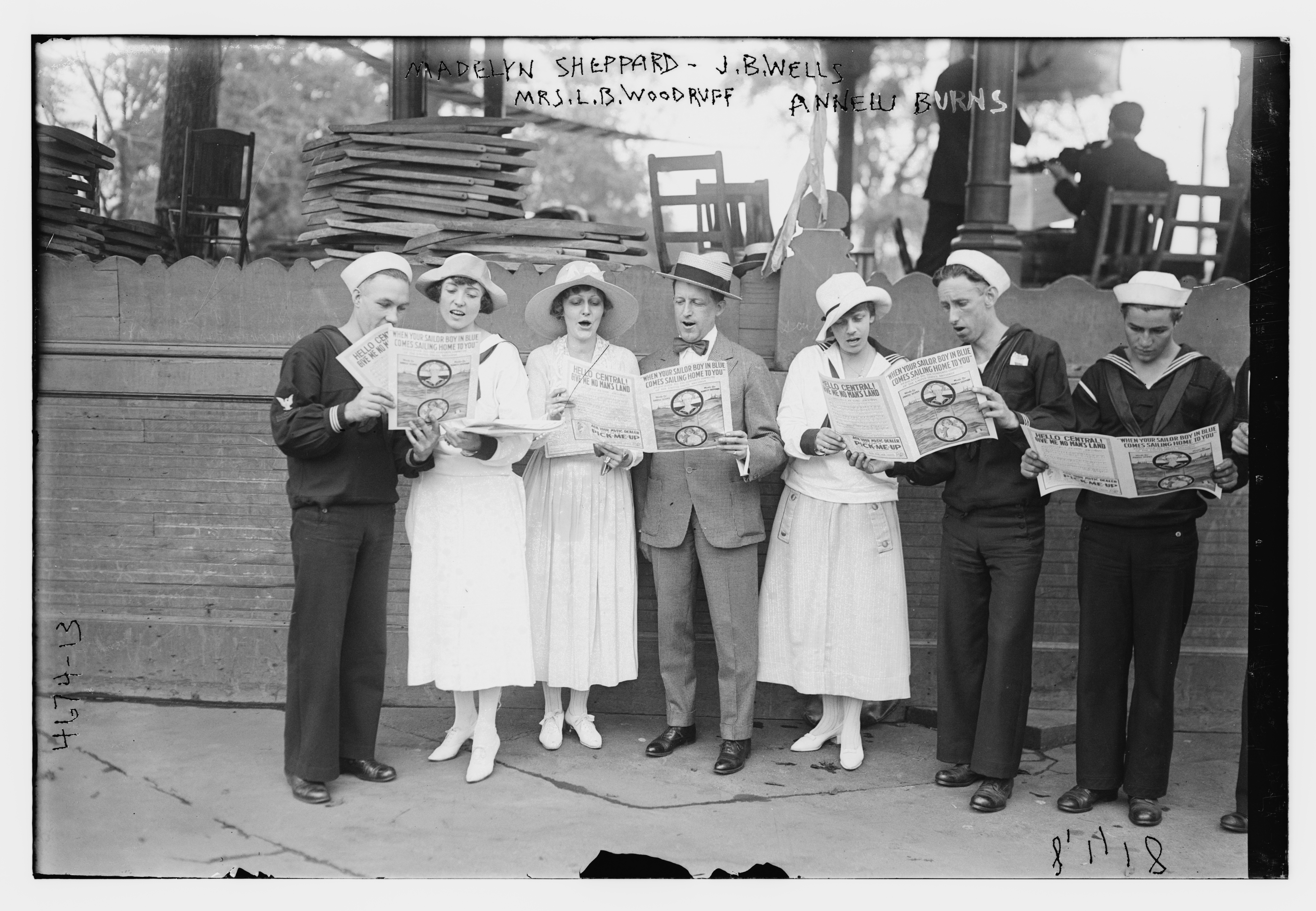
Madelyn Sheppard, John Barnes Wells, Helen Smith Woodruff, Annelu Burns (c. 1915)
