= Murray Anderson's Almanac =

- A Revusical Comedy of Yesterday-Today-Tomorrow (1880–1930)
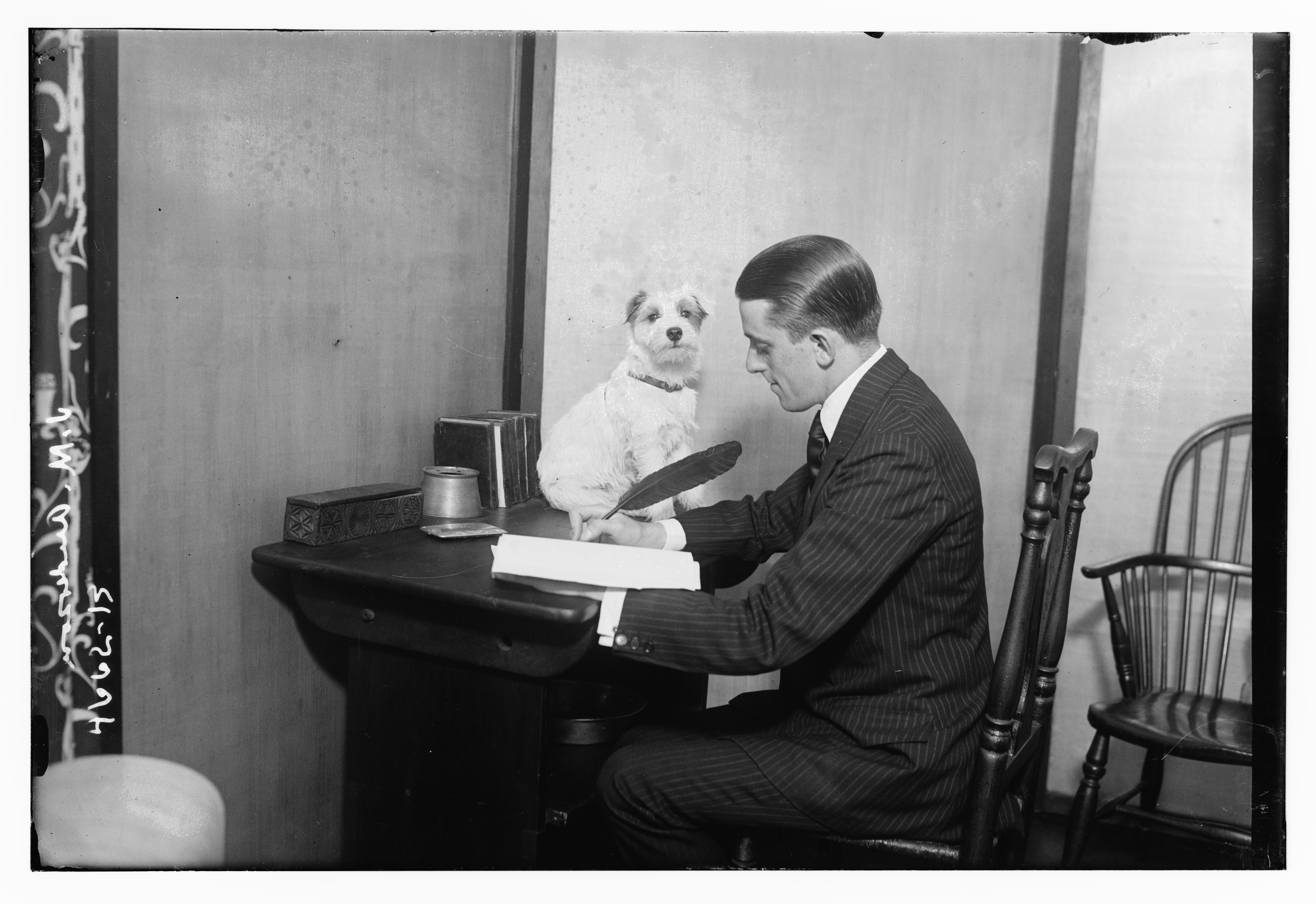
- John Murray Anderson. Circa 1918
- Music: Henry Sullivan and Milton Ager
- Lyrics: Jack Yellen
- Book: Harry Ruskin, Noël Coward, Paul Gerard Smith, Ronald Jeans, Peter Arno, Anna Wynne O'Ryan, and Rube Goldberg
- Basis: Based on the style of an almanac.
- Premiere: August 14, 1929: Erlanger's Theater

Murray Anderson's Almanac: A Revusical Comedy of Yesterday-Today-Tomorrow (1880–1930) was a Broadway show from 1929.

It was produced by the Almanack Theatrical Corporation with John Murray Anderson and Gil Boag as directors. It was based on the style of an almanac publication. The chronological order of the 28 scenes in the show was referred to by page numbers, and so scene 5 was described on page 5 in the program and so on. The theatrical corporation produced what it called the first edition of the show on August 14, 1929, at the Erlanger's Theater on Broadway in New York City.

The authors of the comedy sketches were Harry Ruskin, Noël Coward, Paul Gerard Smith, Ronald Jeans, Peter Arno, Anna Wynne, and Rube Goldberg.

Music was by Henry Sullivan and Milton Ager with lyrics by Jack Yellen.

A song that was produced for the show by Henry Sullivan was I May Be Wrong (but I Think You're Wonderful), which went on to become a popular song with multiple cover versions of it.

The show was directed by John Murray Anderson, Harry Ruskin, and William Holbrook.

The cast members were Trixie Friganza, Jimmy Savo, Roy Atwell, Eleanor Shaler, William Griffith, Fred Keating, Billie Gerber, and Stella Power.

== Music ==
Musical Score for the Show
Title	Lyricist	Composer
I can't remember the words	Jack Yellen	Milton Ager Henry Lodge
Wait for the happy ending	Jack Yellen	Milton Ager
Educate your feet	Jack Yellen	Milton Ager
Same old moon	Clifford Orr John Murray Anderson	Henry Sullivan
The nightingale song	Jack Yellen	Milton Ager
Tinkle! Tinkle!	Jack Yellen	Milton Ager
I may be wrong: But, I think you're wonderful!.	Harry Ruskin	Henry Sullivan

== Gallery ==
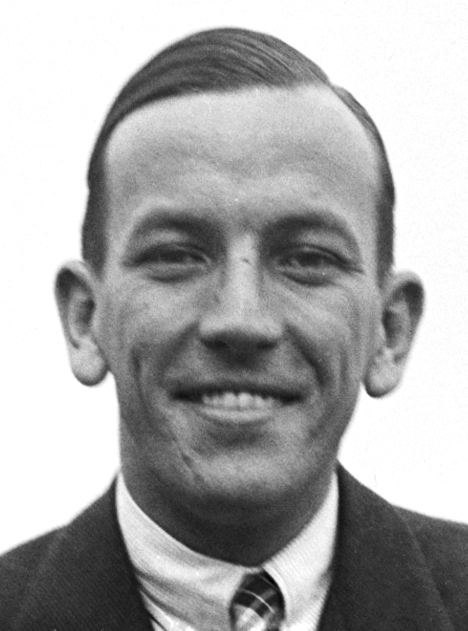
Noël Coward, author of some of the sketches.

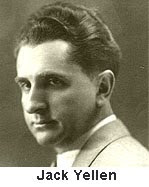
Jack Yellen, lyricist for the show.

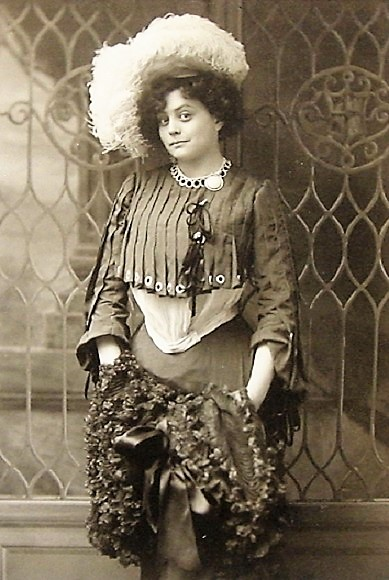
Trixie Friganza, cast member

Jimmy Savo, cast member

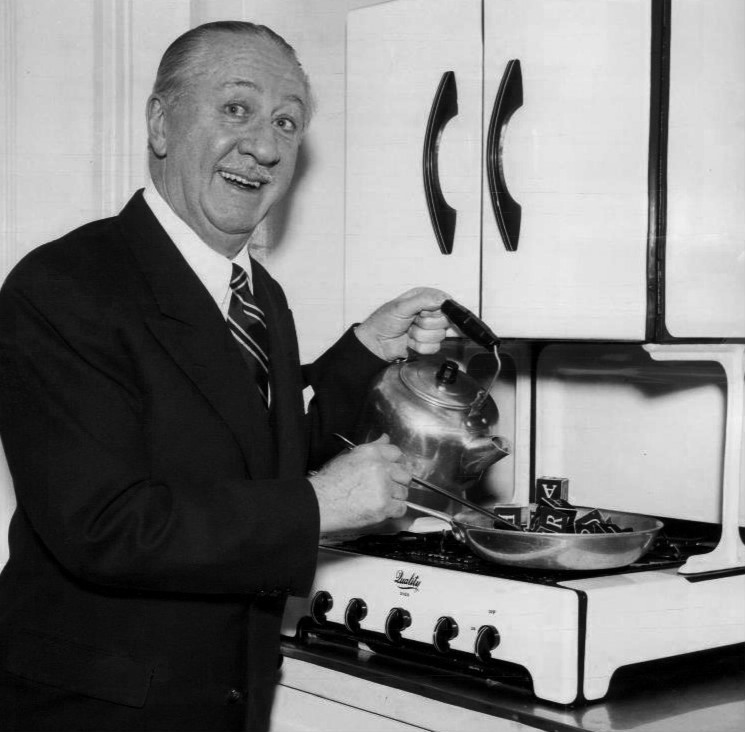
Roy Atwell, cast member (image circa 1940).
