= Madelyn Sheppard =

American pianist, singer, and composer

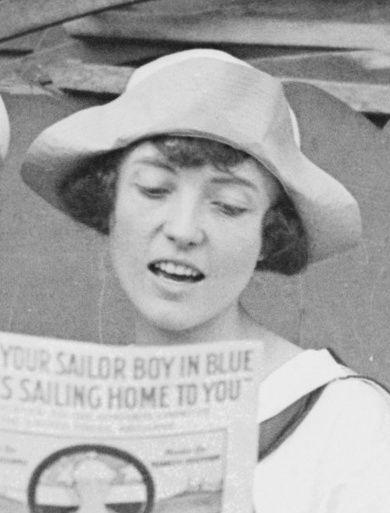
- Sheppard in c. 1915

Background information
- Origin: Selma, Alabama, U.S.
- Died: 1990
- Occupations: Pianist, singer, composer
- Instruments: Piano, vocal

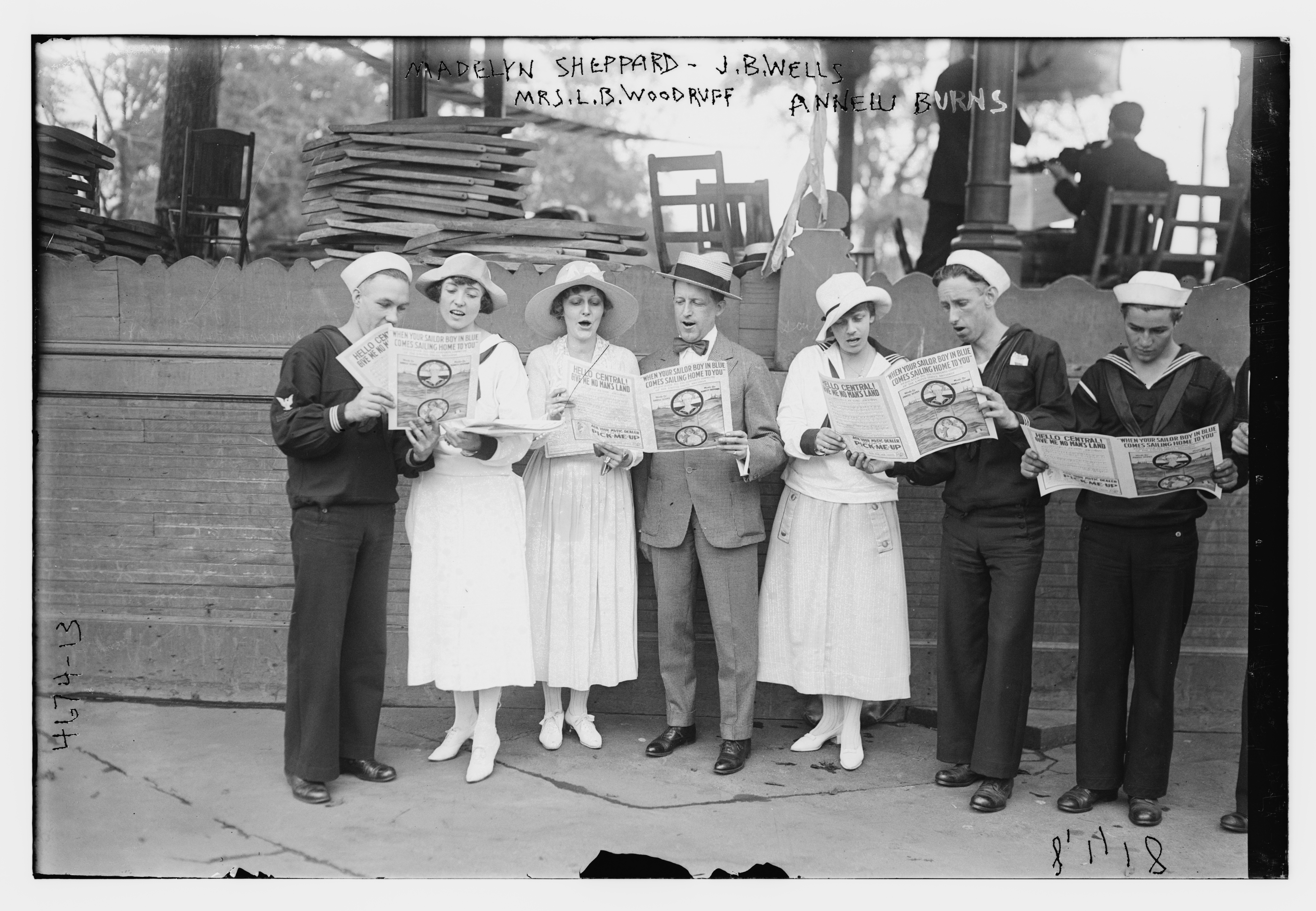
Madelyn Sheppard, John Barnes Wells, Helen Smith Woodruff, Annelu Burns (c. 1915)

Madelyn Sheppard (died in 1990) was an American pianist, singer, and composer from Selma, Alabama. She frequently collaborated with lyricist Annelu Burns on spirituals and blues songs, including creating music for the theater and film industries. She composed the score for the 1922 Broadway musical, Just Because, which "may well have been the first full-length Broadway musical authored entirely by women", according to the Library of Congress.

== Life and career ==
Sheppard grew up on a plantation in the Alabama Black Belt. Her family lived in Dallas County, Alabama. She studied music and literature at a university in Birmingham, Alabama, and graduated from both Judson College and a woman's college in Montgomery, Alabama. In 1926, she married Joseph Bryant, a music store owner in New York City who was from Selma.

Sheppard studied singing under Edward G. Powell.

In 1918, Sheppard and Annelu Burns composed the music and lyrics for the musical comedy Hooray for the Girls, with the book written by Helen Smith Woodruff. The musical was staged in December the same year by the American Committee for Devastated France as part of a post-war fundraising effort.

She composed the score for the musical comedy, Just Because, which obtained a copyright in 1919. The play opened on Broadway on March 22, 1922 at the Earl Carroll Theatre. According to Ben West at the Library of Congress, the play "may well have been the first full-length Broadway musical authored entirely by women."

She also wrote music for The Greatest Game in Town by Dorothy Looker with lyrics and choreography by Evelyn Davis.

Sheppard died in 1990 and was buried at the New Live Oak Cemetery in Selma, Alabama.

== Compositions ==
- "When Your Sailor Boy in Blue Comes Sailing Home to You", music
- Pickaninny Rose, Victor records, sung by Olive Kline and conducted by Josef Pasternack (Pickaninny)
- "Jibber Jabber Jazz" (1920)
- "Kalua Moon", music, words by Annelu Burns. Recorded by the South Sea Hawaiians on Cameo records in 1922.
- "Oh, Those Jazzing Toes"
- "Many Many Years Ago", music
- That Little Old Sweetheart of Mine, with Burns
- Love Just Simply Love (1922), music (words by Helen S. Woodruff), for Just Because
