= It's a Big Wide Wonderful World =

"It's A Big, Wide, Wonderful World" is a popular song written by John Rox and published in 1939.

The song first appeared in the short-lived 1940 Broadway musical play All in Fun when it was introduced by Walter Cassel and Wynn Murray.

A version by Buddy Clark reached a peak on the Billboard charts at #25 in 1949.

== Cover versions ==
- Les Baxter
- Betty Carter
- Peggy Lee for her album Mink Jazz (1963).
- Vaughn Monroe
- Joan Regan
- Diana Trask
- Jay and The Americans
- Margaret Whiting & Jack Smith (1949).
- Chris Isaak

== Film appearances ==
Sung by Deanna Durbin in her last film, "For the Love of Mary," in 1948. Cut from the film for its original release, subsequent video versions have restored it.

It was sung by Dean Martin in his 1954 film, 3 Ring Circus.

The Ford Motor Company's extravagant 1960 model introduction TV commercial, 3 minutes long, used the song, recast as "A Wonderful New World of Fords."

It was also featured in the film Sweet Bird of Youth (1962) when it was played as background music in the swimming scene.

It was sung by Charlene Dallas in the 1975 comedy "Rancho Deluxe". (Charlene Dallas breaks into song at dinner table until silenced by Slim Pickens.) It is sung by cousins Izzy and Jules played by Kevin Pollak and Aidan Quinn in the 1990 film Avalon.

Films with It's a Big Wide Wonderful World in the Soundtrack
Film title	Year
An Angel Comes to Brooklyn	1945
Rhythm Inn	1951
3 Ring Circus	1954
Sweet Bird of Youth	1962
A Safe Place	1971
Rancho Deluxe	1975
Avalon	1990
Rover Dangerfield	1991
