= Vernon Duke =

Russian-American composer and songwriter (1903–1969)

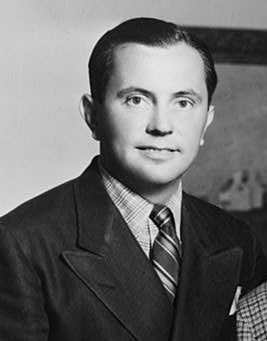
- Duke in 1937

Background information
- Born: Vladimir Aleksandrovich Dukelsky; 10 October 1903; Parfyanovka, Pskov Governorate, Russian Empire
- Died: 16 January 1969 (aged 65) Santa Monica, California, U.S.
- Genres: Broadway musicals, Classical
- Occupations: Songwriter; composer

Vernon Duke (10 October [O.S. 27 September] 1903 – 16 January 1969) was a Russian and American composer and songwriter, who also wrote under his birth name, Vladimir Dukelsky. He is best known for "Taking a Chance on Love," with lyrics by Ted Fetter and John Latouche (1940); "I Can't Get Started," with lyrics by Ira Gershwin (1936); "April in Paris," with lyrics by E. Y. ("Yip") Harburg (1932), and "What Is There To Say," for the Ziegfeld Follies of 1934, also with Harburg.

Duke wrote the words and music for "Autumn in New York" (1934) for the revue Thumbs Up! In his book American Popular Song, The Great Innovators 1900–1950, composer Alec Wilder praises this song, writing: "The verse may be the most ambitious I've ever seen."

Duke also collaborated with lyricists Johnny Mercer, Ogden Nash, and Sammy Cahn.

== Early life ==
Vladimir Aleksandrovich Dukelsky (Russian: Владимир Александрович Дукельский) was born on 10 October [O.S. 27 September] 1903 in the village of Parfyanovka, then part of Pskov Governorate in the Russian Empire.

At the time, his mother "happened to be traveling by train". His family descended from the West Russian (Belarusian) nobility. They belonged to the small gentry class; the 1954 Grove's Dictionary of Music and Musicians referred to his paternal grandmother, née Princess Tumanishvili, as having been "directly descended from the kings of Georgia". According to Duke, his mother also had some Austrian and Spanish ancestry. The Jewish Standard lists him among Jewish musicians, for reasons unknown; composer Jack Gottlieb denies this claim.

The Dukelskys resided in Kiev, and Vladimir's only visit to Saint Petersburg and Moscow occurred in the summer of 1915. The impressions of that summer were later echoed in Dukelsky's oratorio The End of St. Petersburg (1931–37). The title is a reference to the film The End of St. Petersburg, directed by Vsevolod Pudovkin.

At the age of 11, Dukelsky was admitted to the Kiev Conservatory, where he studied composition with Reinhold Glière and musical theory with Boleslav Yavorsky. In 1919, his family fled the turmoil of the civil war in Kiev and, after considerable difficulties, moved to Odessa, where Dukelsky studied under Witold Maliszewski. Eventually, the family was forced to leave Russia and spent a year and a half among other refugees in Constantinople. In 1921, they obtained American visas and sailed steerage class on the SS King Alexander to New York.

He underwent his immigration inspection at Ellis Island. On the passenger list, the purser of the King Alexander recorded his name as Vladimir Doukelsky, in the French fashion. In 1922 in New York, George Gershwin befriended the young immigrant. Gershwin (born Jacob Gershwine) suggested that Dukelsky truncate and Americanize his surname, taking Vernon as his given name; Duke later explained that this was necessary because his then-publisher Serge Koussevitzsky would not accept use of the "Dukelsky" name on the composer's "commercial" creations. Dukelsky's first songs published under his pen name were conceived that year, but he continued to write classical music and Russian poetry under his birth name until 1955.

== Career ==
In 1924, Dukelsky returned to Europe. In Paris, he received a commission from Serge Diaghilev to compose a ballet. Dukelsky's first theatrical production, Zephyr and Flora, was staged in the 1925 season of Ballets Russes, with choreography by Léonide Massine and scenography by Georges Braque, to great critical acclaim. In a review of musical novelties of the season, Sergei Prokofiev described it as full of "superior melodies, very well designed, harmonically beautiful and not too 'modernist'." Prokofiev was as impressed with the young talent as Diaghilev was, and soon the composers became close friends. They frequently saw each other until Prokofiev returned to the Soviet Union in 1938; they continued to correspond until 1946. Dukelsky's First Symphony was premiered by Serge Koussevitzky and his orchestra in 1928 in Paris on the same bill as excerpts from Prokofiev's The Fiery Angel. Some of Dukelsky's and Prokofiev's compositions of the 1930s bear evidence of their musical dialogue.

In the late 1920s, Dukelsky divided his time between Paris, where his more classical works were performed, and London, where he composed numbers for musical comedies under his pen name Vernon Duke. In 1929, he returned to the United States with the intention of settling in the country permanently. He composed and published much serious music, but devoted greater efforts to establishing himself on Broadway. Duke's songs "April in Paris" (1932), "Autumn in New York" (1934), "I Like the Likes of You" (1934), "Water Under the Bridge" (1934), and "I Can't Get Started" (1936) were 1930s hits.

The support and devotion of Serge Koussevitzky, who published Dukelsky's chamber music and conducted his orchestral scores, helped him develop his classical works. Dukelsky's concerto for piano, orchestra, and soprano obbligato, titled Dédicaces (1935–1937), was premièred by Koussevitzky and the Boston Symphony Orchestra in January 1939 in New York. His oratorio, The End of St. Petersburg, was premiered a year earlier by Schola Cantorum and the New York Philharmonic under Hugh Ross. In 1937, the composer was asked to complete Gershwin's last score, a soundtrack to a Technicolor extravaganza The Goldwyn Follies, to which he contributed two parody ballets choreographed by George Balanchine, and the song "Spring Again". In 1939, Dukelsky became an American citizen and took Vernon Duke as his legal name. Duke's greatest success came a year later, with the Broadway musical Cabin in the Sky (1940), choreographed by George Balanchine and performed by an all-black cast at the Martin Beck Theater in New York. His Violin Concerto in G Minor, begun in 1941, was completed in early 1942.

=== Military service ===
Between August 1942 and 1944, he served in the US Coast Guard. While in service, he discovered Sid Caesar, a saxophone player in the Coast Guard Band, and wrote a touring show for the Coast Guard called Tars & Spars. He also conceived some of his finest music in the classical tradition, including a blues-influenced Cello Concerto (commissioned by Gregor Piatigorsky)

=== Third Symphony ===
His Third Symphony (1946) was dedicated to the memory of Koussevitzky's wife, Natalie. Over the years, Serge and Natalie Koussevitzky, Dukelsky's devoted supporters, had become his surrogate family. When Dukelsky's mother died, in 1942, the composer took the conductor's refusal to commission the work with great bitterness. The dedication was revoked and the relationship soured.

In 1946, Duke left the United States for France, where he continued his double career of being a classical composer and a songwriter (now setting to music the texts of French lyricists). By 1948, the composer was back in America. He moved from New York to California, where he spent his last decades writing songs, film and theater scores, chamber music, poetry in Russian and polemical articles and memoirs in English. On October 30, 1957, he married singer Kay McCracken. His final appearance on Broadway came less than two weeks later with the two songs and incidental music he wrote for the Helen Hayes show, Jean Anouilh's Time Remembered (1940) (French title: Léocadia) which ran for 247 performances. He continued to try to mount Broadway musicals during the last decade of his life, including two shows that closed during tryouts, and one that was never produced.

=== Later works ===
As a classical composer, Dukelsky used the same musical language as his modernist contemporaries Sergei Prokofiev, Arthur Lourié, and, to a lesser extent, Igor Stravinsky. His harmonies, however, were highly original. As a songwriter and author of theatrical and film music, his work was close to that of George Gershwin and Harold Arlen, but he developed an idiosyncratic voice of his own. His memoir, Passport to Paris, first published in 1955, was reissued, together with Boris Dralyuk's translations of nineteen of Duke's Russian-language poems, in 2025. He also published Listen Here! a Critical Essay on Music Depreciation in 1963.

== Death ==
Duke died in Santa Monica, California on 16 January 1969, during surgery for lung cancer. His numerous papers—musical and literary manuscripts and correspondence in English, French, and Russian—are stored in the Musical Division of the Library of Congress.

== Works ==
=== As Vladimir Dukelsky ===
- Zéphyr et Flore 1925; Ode Epitaphe 1931 poems by Osip Mandelstam in memorial to Diaghilev. Sung in Russian Ilma Achmadeeva (soprano), Netherlands Theatre Choir, Residentie Orchestra of the Hague. Gennady Rozhdestvensky Chandos, 1999.
- Violin Concerto 1941–42; Chloë Hanslip, Singapore Symphony Orchestra, cond. Andrew Litton. Chandos, 2025.
- Cello Concerto 1946; Samuel Magill, Cello. Piano Concerto Orchestrated by Scott Dunn. Scott Dunn, Piano. Dmitri Yablonsky, Conductor. Russian Philharmonic. Naxos, 2007.

=== As Vernon Duke ===
- 1931 – Tarnished Lady
- 1932 – Walk A Little Faster (lyrics by E.Y. "Yip" Harburg)
  - "April in Paris"
  - "A Penny for Your Thoughts"
  - "Off Again, On Again"
  - "Speaking of Love"
  - "Where Have We Met Before?"
- 1934 – Ziegfeld Follies of 1934 (music also by others – Duke lyrics by E.Y. Harburg)
  - "I Like the Likes of You"
  - "What Is There To Say?"
- 1934 – Thumbs Up! (music also by others – Duke lyrics by Vernon Duke)
  - "Autumn in New York"
  - "Words Without Music" (lyrics by Ira Gershwin)
- 1936 – Ziegfeld Follies of 1936 (lyrics by Ira Gershwin)
  - "I Can't Get Started"
  - "He Hasn't a Thing Except Me"
  - "Words Without Music"
  - "Island in the West Indies"
- 1938 – Spring Again (lyrics by Ira Gershwin)
- 1940 – Cabin in the Sky (lyrics by John Latouche)
  - "Taking a Chance on Love"
  - "Cabin in the Sky"
  - "Honey in the Honeycomb"
  - "Love Me Tomorrow"
- 1941 – Banjo Eyes (lyrics by John Latouche and Harold Adamson)
  - "We're Having a Baby"
  - "Who Started the Rhumba?"
  - "A Nickel to My Name"
- 1942 – The Lady Comes Across (lyrics by John Latouche)
  - "Summer Is A-Commin' In"
  - "You Took Me By Surprise"
  - "This Is Where I Came In"
  - "Lady"
- 1944 – Jackpot (lyrics by Howard Dietz)
  - "What Happened"
  - "Sugarfoot"
  - "I've Got a One-Track Mind"
  - "I Kissed My Girl Goodbye"
- 1944 – Sadie Thompson (lyrics by Howard Dietz)
  - "The Love I Long For"
  - "Poor as a Church Mouse"
  - "When You Live on an Island"
- 1946 – Sweet Bye and Bye (lyrics by Ogden Nash; book by S. J. Perelman and Al Hirschfeld)
- 1949 – "Ogden Nash's Musical Zoo", for voice and piano
- 1952 – Two's Company (lyrics by Ogden Nash and Sammy Cahn)
  - "It Just Occurred to Me"
  - "Roundabout"
  - "Out of the Clear Blue Sky"
  - "Haunted Hot Spot"
  - "Just Like a Man"
- 1956 – The Littlest Revue (music also by others – Duke lyrics by Ogden Nash)
  - "I Want to Fly Now (and Pay Later)"
  - "Summer Is A-Comin' In"
  - "Good Little Girls"
  - "Love Is Still in Town"
  - "You're Far from Wonderful"
  - "Madly in Love"
- 1963 – Zenda (lyrics by Lenny Adelson, Sid Kuller, and Martin Charnin)

== Sources ==
- Jaffé, Daniel (March 8, 2012). "Dukelsky, Vladimir Aleksandrovich (Vernon Duke)". Historical Dictionary of Russian Music. Bloomsbury Publishing USA. pp. 110–111. ISBN 979-8-216-20808-2.
- Robinson, Harlow (2007). Russians in Hollywood, Hollywood's Russians: Biography of an Image. Northeastern University Press. ISBN 978-1-55553-686-2.
- Tyler, Don (April 16, 2007). "Veron Duke (real name: Vladimir Dukelsky; 1903–1969)". Hit Songs, 1900-1955: American Popular Music of the Pre-Rock Era. McFarland. pp. 382–383. ISBN 978-0-7864-2946-2.
- Zelensky, Natalie K. (April 24, 2019). Performing Tsarist Russia in New York: Music, Émigrés, and the American Imagination. Indiana University Press. ISBN 978-0-253-04120-3.
