= Henry Sullivan (composer) =

American composer, songwriter and pianist (1895–1975)

- Born: Henry Anthony Sullivan; 1895
- Died: 1975 (aged 79–80)
- Education: Worcester Academy; Dartmouth College
- Occupations: Composer; songwriter; pianist
- Years active: 1929–1950s
- Style: Musicals

Henry Anthony Sullivan (1895–1975) was an American composer, songwriter, and pianist.

== Biography ==
Sullivan attended the Worcester Academy and Dartmouth College.

In 1929, he wrote his first complete show, Almanac, which was produced by John Murray Anderson as Murray Anderson's Almanac on Broadway in 1929. Some of the comedy sketches were written by Noël Coward. From the show came the song "I May Be Wrong (but I Think You're Wonderful)", with music by Sullivan and lyrics by Harry Ruskin. It would go on to become a popular song with multiple cover versions.

With Anderson's 1931 production of Bow Bells, Sullivan wrote the music for "Mona Lisa" (not to be confused with the 1949 Evans & Livingston song "Mona Lisa", recorded by Nat King Cole and others), and other songs in the show. Sullivan would later write the music for the Broadway show Thumbs Up! (1934), with Anderson staging the show as well writing some of the lyrics. Together, they would write five songs for the film The Greatest Show on Earth (1952), along with other copyrighted songs as well.

== Broadway shows ==
| Title | Opening | Role |
|---|---|---|
| John Murray Anderson's Almanac | 1953 | Additional music and lyrics |
| Thumbs Up! | 1934 | Music |
| Keep Moving | 1934 | Music for "A Page from Jonathan Swift" and "Comnand to Love" |
| Murray Anderson's Almanac | 1929 | Music |

== Discography ==
| Song and Authorship | Year |
|---|---|
| "Picnic in the Park" from the film The Greatest Show on Earth words: John Murray Anderson, music: Henry Sullivan | 1951 |
| "You Can't Say Goodbye to Hawaii" from the film The Greatest Show on Earth words: John Murray Anderson, music: Henry Sullivan | 1951 |
| "Sing a Happy Song" from the film The Greatest Show on Earth words: John Murray Anderson, music: Henry Sullivan | 1952 |
| "Popcorn and Lemonade" from the film The Greatest Show on Earth words: John Murray Anderson, music: Henry Sullivan | 1952 |
| "If Every Month Were June" words: John Murray Anderson, music: Henry Sullivan | 1953 |
| "Hudson River" words: Henry Myers, music: Henry Sullivan | 1955 |
| "I May Be Wrong (but I Think You're Wonderful)" words: Harry Ruskin, music: Henry Sullivan, arranged for dance orchestra | 1959 |
