= Autumn in New York (song) =

Song by J. Harold Murray
- Written: 1934
- Published: 1949
- Genre: Jazz
- Songwriter: Vernon Duke

"Autumn in New York" is a jazz standard and popular song composed by Vernon Duke in Westport, Connecticut in the summer of 1934. It was written without a commission or for a specific show, but Duke offered it to producer Murray Anderson for his Broadway musical Thumbs Up! The play opened on December 27, 1934, when the song was performed by singer J. Harold Murray. The song was not published until 1949. (Note: See its original copyright registration.)

Many versions of the song have been recorded over the years by numerous musicians and singers. The only version to achieve chart success as a single in the US was that by Frank Sinatra, which reached No. 27 in 1949. Jazz versions have been performed by the Hi-Lo's, Charlie Parker, Billie Holiday, Sonny Stitt, Dexter Gordon, Bing Crosby, Kenny Dorham, Mary Lou Williams, Stan Kenton, Sarah Vaughan, Chet Baker, Sheila Jordan, Johnny Mathis, Bill Evans, Tal Farlow, Ahmad Jamal, Lena Horne, Buddy De Franco, Salvador Sobral, Al Haig, Diana Krall, Kimiko Itoh, and a duet version by Scottish singers Todd Gordon and Carol Kidd. The song was also recorded by Jo Stafford, and by Louis Armstrong and Ella Fitzgerald as a duet. Harry Connick Jr. did a New Orleans Jazz version of the song for the 1989 movie, “When Harry Met Sally”. In June 2026, CBS News included the song in its list of the 250 essential American songs of the past 250 years.

== See also ==
- List of 1930s jazz standards
