= Elaine Dunn =

American singer, dancer, and actress

- Born: Elaine Dombcik; 1933/1934 (Age 91-92)
- Occupations: Singer, dancer, actor
- Spouse: Dean Shendal
- Children: 1

Elaine Dunn (born Elaine Dombcik, 1933 or 1934) is an American singer, dancer, and actress.

== Early years ==
Dunn is the daughter of a commercial artist in Cleveland. Her uncle, a dancer and comedian in night clubs, encouraged her to become a dancer. She took voice lessons to correct a speech impediment that she had as a child. She began taking ballet and tap dancing lessons when she was 7. At age 13, she won a contest that included 750 other girls, resulting in an appearance at a benefit performance with Danny Kaye. That appearance, in turn, led to her performing at Chin's Victory Room in Cleveland, after which she spent three years touring the East and Midwest with her mother as her companion and manager.

== Career ==
Dunn gained prominence at age 18 at the Copacabana in New York City, when her two-minute flamenco dance "brought fierce applause" from the audience. A follow-up review in the trade publication Billboard called Dunn's performance "still as electric as when first caught." After that, she began performing on Broadway and in clubs in Las Vegas. Her Broadway credits include John Murray Anderson's Almanac (1953), Catch a Star! (1955), and Pal Joey (1963).

In 1960, Dunn played the female lead in a touring company's production of Flower Drum Song. She starred in West Coast productions of Bye Bye Birdie (1961) and Sweet Charity (1967).

On television, Dunn was a regular on Broadway Open House. She also was featured on the TV shows of Perry Como, Bob Hope, Red Skelton Steve Allen, The Wild Wild West (S2/E13) and Ed Sullivan and appeared on The Hollywood Palace and The Bell Telephone Hour.

In 1957, she was a vocalist in The Tropicana Revue at the Tropicana Hotel in Las, Vegas Nevada. She became good friends with model and showgirl Marilyn Johnson.

In 1959, Dunn recorded "Touch Me" backed by "Far Away Places" on RCA Victor (7552). In 1961, she signed an exclusive contract with Warner Bros. Records.

During the Vietnam War, Dunn traveled in a troupe led by Hope to entertain military personnel.

== Personal life ==
Dunn married hotel executive Dean Shendal, and they have a son.
