= I Want a Hippopotamus for Christmas =

1953 Christmas novelty song by Gayla Peevey

Single by Gayla Peevey
- B-side: "Are My Ears on Straight?"
- Released: November 11, 1953 (U.S.)
- Genre: Christmas; novelty
- Length: 2:38
- Label: Columbia (no. 4-40106)
- Songwriter: John Rox

"I Want a Hippopotamus for Christmas" is a Christmas novelty song written by John Rox (Note: Attributed to multiple sources:) and performed by 10-year-old Gayla Peevey in 1953. The song peaked at number 24 on Billboard magazine's pop chart in December 1953.

== History ==
"I Want a Hippopotamus for Christmas" was released by Columbia Records, with the B-side of the original record featuring "Are My Ears on Straight?". Upon its national release, the song shot to the top of the charts. Peevey performed the song on the November 13, 1953, episode of The Ed Sullivan Show, which had been recorded earlier in October.

A popular legend holds that the 1953 hit had been recorded as a fundraiser to bring the city zoo a hippopotamus, but in a 2007 radio interview with Detroit-based WNIC radio station, Peevey clarified that the song was not originally recorded as a fundraiser. Instead, the Oklahoma City Zoo (located in Peevey's birthplace of Oklahoma City, Oklahoma) and a local newspaper, picking up on the popularity of the song and Peevey's local roots, launched the Gayla Peevey hippo fund so Peevey could be presented with an actual hippopotamus on Christmas. The campaign succeeded, and Peevey was presented with an actual hippopotamus, which—as had been planned all along—she donated to the city zoo. The hippopotamus, named Mathilda, lived for nearly 50 years. In 2017, Peevey, then 73 years old, was again present when the Oklahoma City Zoo acquired a rare pygmy hippopotamus from the San Diego Zoo.

In a 2010 interview, Peevey said that she had never received any royalties from the song. However, in 2016 she discovered that there was an account under her name with Sony Music from which she could claim royalties and she was also getting revenue for the song through iTunes.

== Other releases ==
- It is a Dr. Demento Christmas staple, having been released on his album The Greatest Novelty Records of All Time Vol. 6: Christmas.
- A version by Vicki Dale and the Peter Pan Orchestra was released in 1953.
- The Three Stooges also recorded a version in 1959.
- Bob Keeshan, as Captain Kangaroo, recorded a version of the song in 1961 with his collaborator Lumpy Brannum as Mr. Green Jeans.
- Malcolm T. Elliot recorded and released a version in 1975. The song peaked at number 83 in Australia.
- Country music singer Gretchen Wilson recorded a rendition in late 2009. It debuted at No. 54 on the Billboard Hot Country Songs charts dated for January 2, 2010. It is included on her album Christmas in My Heart, released in 2013.
- American recording artist LeAnn Rimes released her cover of the song as a digital single for her EP, One Christmas: Chapter 1 (2014).
- American musical duo A Great Big World recorded a version of the song which was released in 2014.
- American recording artist Kacey Musgraves recorded and released a version in 2016 for her Christmas album entitled A Very Kacey Christmas.
