= Gayla Peevey =

American singer and child star (born 1943)

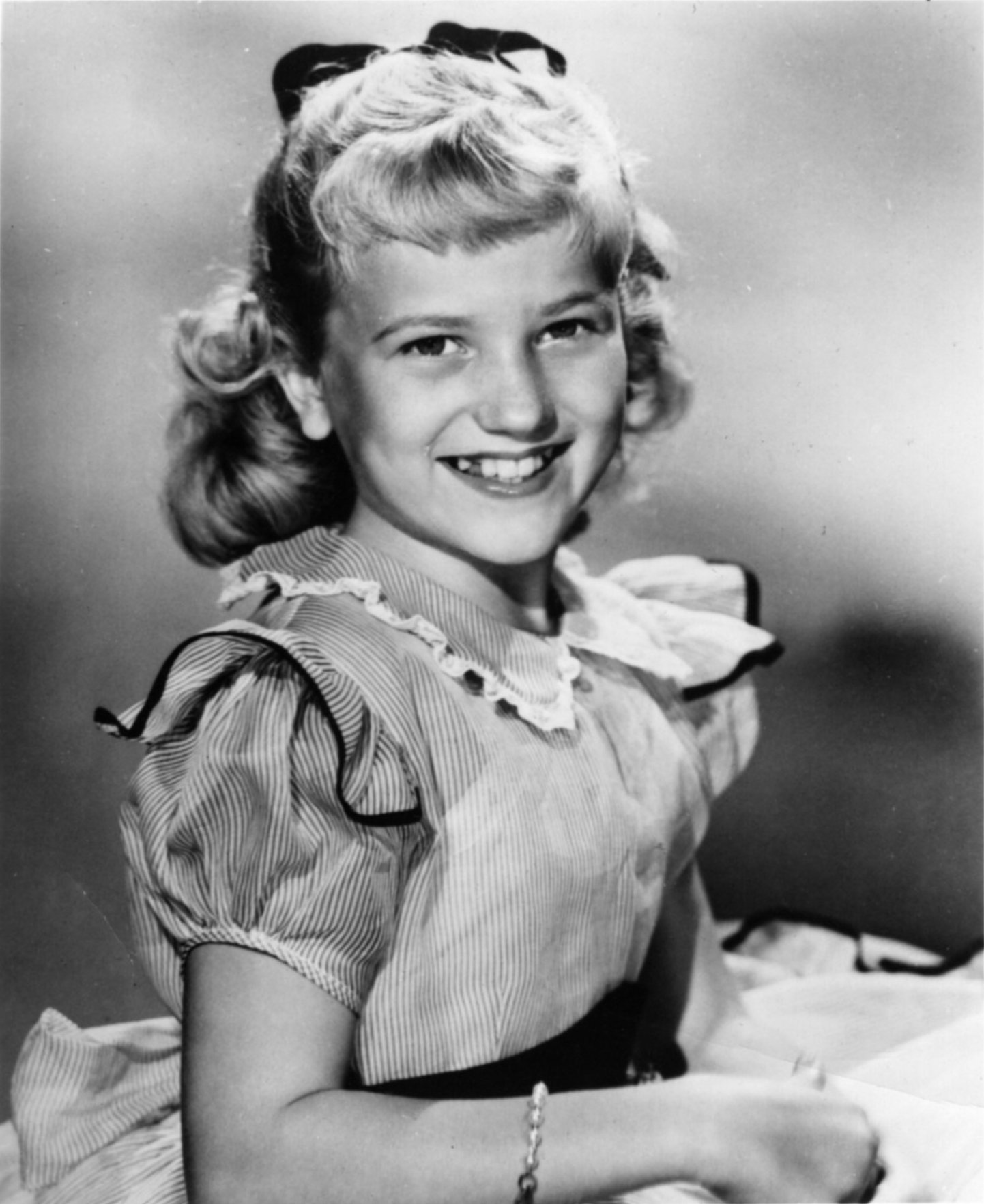
- Publicity photo of Gayla Peevey in 1953

Background information
- Born: Gayla Rienette Peevey; March 8, 1943 (age 83); Oklahoma City, Oklahoma, U.S.
- Occupation: Singer
- Instrument: Vocals
- Years active: 1953–1962
- Labels: Columbia, Joy

Gayla Rienette Peevey (born March 8, 1943) is a former singer and child star from Oklahoma City, Oklahoma. She is best known for her recording of "I Want a Hippopotamus for Christmas" (Columbia 4-40106, 1953). Peevey recorded the novelty song when she was 10 years old. In 1960, under the name Jamie Horton, she had a minor hit with her single "My Little Marine" (Joy 45-234, 1959), which reached #84 on Billboard's Hot 100 in early 1960. She also recorded "Robot Man", a cover of a Connie Francis UK hit, but it failed to reach the charts.

== Biography ==
The Peevey family moved to Ponca City, Oklahoma, in 1948. Prior to moving to California, she attended Columbus Elementary School. Peevey graduated from San Diego State University with a Bachelor of Education degree. She eventually left teaching. She is married to Cliff Henderson. They have a daughter, Sydney Forest, and three grandchildren. Following her retirement from performing, Peevey runs her own jingle advertisement company and sings in her local church.

== In popular culture ==
The Oklahoma City Zoo capitalized upon the popularity of "I Want A Hippopotamus For Christmas" with a fundraising campaign to "buy a hippo for Gayla". The fund raised $3,000 (equivalent to US$36,101 in 2025), and a baby hippopotamus named Matilda was purchased and given to Peevey, which she then donated to the zoo in 1953. Matilda spent 45 years in the Oklahoma City Zoo, and then died at age 47 from a heart attack in 1998 while being transferred to Walt Disney World's Disney's Animal Kingdom, in Orlando, Florida.

== Singles as Gayla Peevey on Columbia Records ==
Year	Title	Label	Single	Matrix No.
1953	I Want a Hippopotamus For Christmas/Are My Ears On Straight	Columbia Records	40106	CO49818/CO49819
	Wish I Wuz A Whisker (On The Easter Bunny's Chin)/Three Little Bunnies		40182	RHCO10747/RHCO10748
	Kitty In The Basket (duet with Jimmy Boyd)/I'm So Glad (duet with Jimmy Boyd)		40218	RHCO10753/RHCO10754
	Upsy Down Town/A Dog Named Joe		40264	CO49820/CO49821
1954	Angel In The Christmas Play/Got A Cold In The Node For Christmas		40364	RHCO33252/RHCO33253
	Daddy's Report Card/The Night I Ran Away		40425	RHCO10749/RHCO10750
1955	77 Santas/Rubberlegs (The Knock-Kneed Monkey)		40602	RZSP33598/RZSP33599
1957	I Want You To Be My Guy/Too Young To Have A Broken Heart		40932	JZSP41539/JZSP41540
1958	That's What I Learned In School/Do It Again		41027	JZSP42215/JZSP42214

== Singles as Jamie Horton on Joy Records ==
Year	Title	Label	Single	Matrix No.
1959	My Little Marine/Missin'	Joy Records (New York)	234	K90W-8507/K90W-8508
1960	Where's My Love/Heartbreakin' Doll		237	KS-193/KS-194
	Just Say So/There Goes My Love		240	L90W-2188
	Robot Man/We're Through – We're Finished		241	JR-7051/JR-7031
	What Should A Teen Heart Do/Hands Off, He's Mine		245	
1961	When It Comes To Love/Yes, I'll Be Your Girl		252	
	Going, Going, Going Gone/They're Playing Our Song (contains elements of 16 Candles)		258	JR-7103/JR-7101
	Dear Jane/Only Forever		266	JR-7073/JR-7122
1962	Go Shout It From A Mountain/Oh Love (Stop Knockin' On My Door)		269	
