= Annelu Burns =

American lyricist (1889–1942)

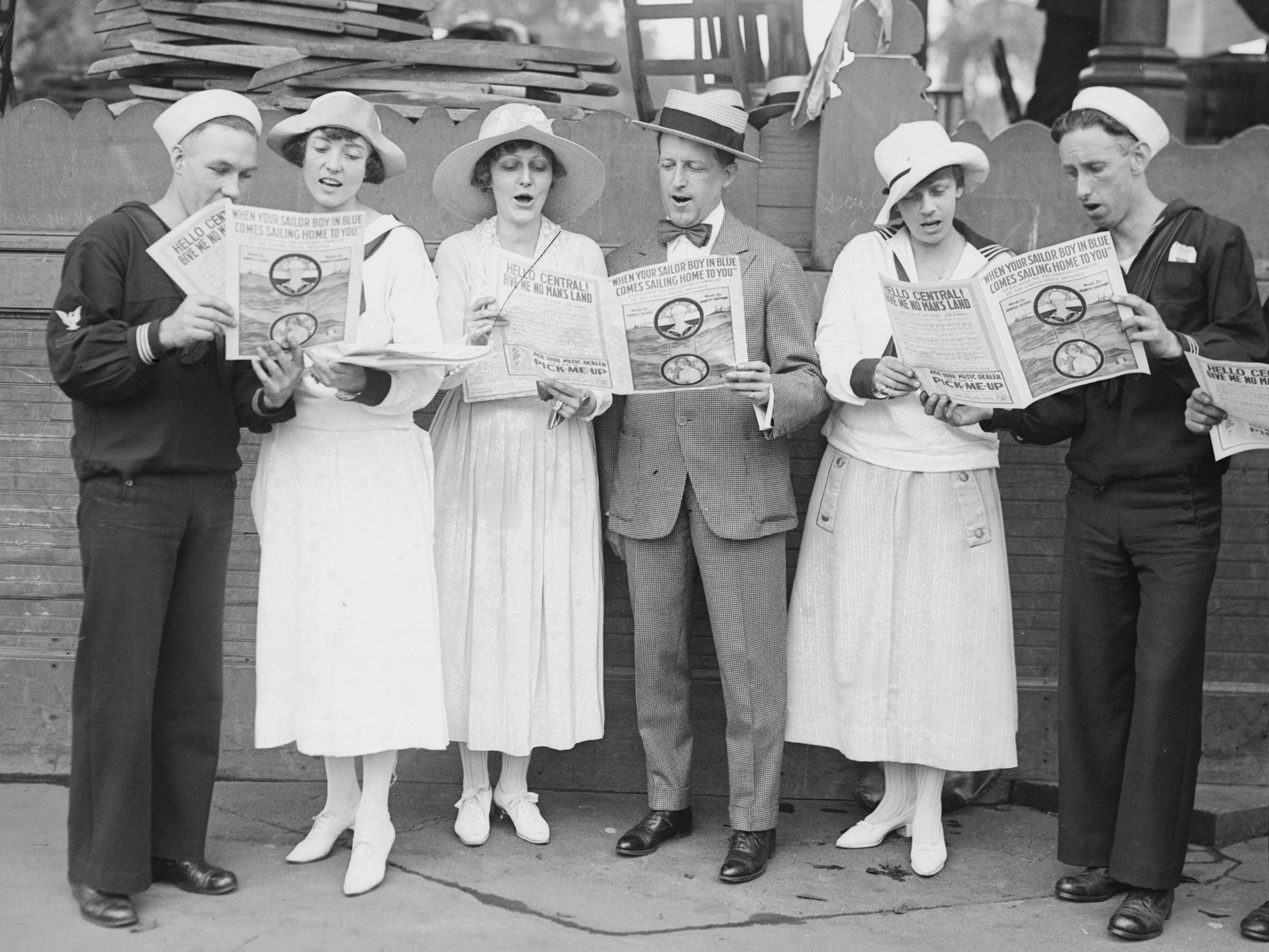
Burns (second from right) singing with Madelyn Sheppard, Helen S. Woodruff, J. B. Wells, and sailors, c. 1918

Annelu Burns (November 12, 1889 – July 11, 1942) was an American lyricist and violinist from Selma, Alabama. She wrote lyrics for songs, theater productions, and films. She frequently wrote songs together with Madelyn Sheppard, a musician and composer who was also from Selma. W. C. Handy's Handy Music Co. published their song “O Saroo Saroo", which Reese DuPree recorded in 1924. Burns also partnered with composer Ernest Ball to produce several popular songs. Later in her life, she worked as a teacher in New York.

== Life and career ==
Annelu Burns was born in Selma, Alabama, on November 12, 1889. She studied at multiple schools, including Judson College, Boston Conservatory, Brenau College, and Leopold Auer School. She was the first woman to graduate from the violin program at Judson College.

In 1917, her book of verse poetry, Lyrics of Love and War was published by A. B. Caldwell Publishing Company. She wrote music alongside Ernest Ball, including lyrics for the songs I'll Forget You and For the Sake of Auld Lang Syne. Her poetry was composed into music by Mana-Zucca, James G. MacDermid, Alexander MacFaydn, Frank La Forge, Cliff Friend, and Max Kortlander.

In 1918, Burns and Madelyn Sheppard composed the lyrics and music for the musical comedy, Hooray for the Girls, with the book written by Helen Smith Woodruff. The musical was staged in December the same year by the American Committee for Devastated France as part of a post-war fundraising effort.

Burns wrote the lyrics for the 1919 version of the musical, Just Because. While the play was being readied for production in New York City, Anna Wynne O'Ryan rewrote the comedy lyrics on behalf of Burns, who was unable to travel to the city from where she was staying in the Southern United States. In 1922, while still unable to return before the New York production, Burns sold her rights to the musical to Helen Smith Woodruff. The songs she sold included "Love-Just Simply Love", "It's Hard to Be A Lady All The Time", "I'll Name My Dolly for You", and "A Wedding is a Mournful Thing Unless it is Your Own."

In Selma, Burns was leader of the Walton Theater Orchestra. She became a member of the American Society of Composers, Authors and Publishers in 1924. From 1932 until 1942, she taught in Pleasantville, New York, both in public schools and privately.

Burns died on July 12, 1942, in Mount Kisco, New York.

== Lyrics ==
- Hooray for the Girls (c. 1918), musical comedy with book by Helen Smith Woodruff and music by Madelyn Sheppard
- Just Because (c. 1919), musical comedy with book by Anna Wynne O'Ryan and music by Madelyn Sheppard
- Oh You (c. 1919), musical comedy with book by Helen Smith Woodruff and music by Madelyn Sheppard
- Raving (The) Beauties (c. 1919), musical comedy with book by Anna Wynne O'Ryan and music by Madelyn Sheppard
