= Ager, Yellen, and Bornstein =

Music-publishing company established in 1922

Ager, Yellen, and Bornstein, Inc. was a music publisher established in 1922 by Milton Ager, Jack Yellen, and Ben Bornstein.

Milton Ager was an American composer and was considered one of the top songwriters of the 1920s and 1930s. Notable compositions of his include Ain't She Sweet, which was popularized by both Frank Sinatra and The Beatles, and Happy Days Are Here Again, which became famous for having been played at the 1932 Democratic National Convention.

Jack Yellen wrote the lyrics to Ain't She Sweet and Happy Days Are Here Again. He also wrote the words and music for the popular song My Yiddishe Momme (Yiddish: א יידישע מאמע).

Ben Bornstein, prior to the music publishing company, was with Harry Von Tilzer Co., a company created by composer, lyricist, and music publisher Harry Von Tilzer.

As composers, Ager and Yellen were able to be the publishers for the songs that they had composed individually or as a writing team.

Some notable songs created by them and published by their publishing company:

Song	Year	Lyricist	Composer(s)	Venue
"She Don't Wanna"	1927	Yellen	Ager & Yellen	Score for Ziegfeld Follies of 1927
"Ain't She Sweet"	1927	Yellen	Ager & Yellen	Chasing Rainbows (1930 film); Hide and Seek (1932 cartoon)
"Happy Days Are Here Again"	1929	Yellen	Ager	1932 Democratic National Convention

Warner Bros. Music acquired the firm.
