= Helen S. Woodruff =

American writer and philanthropist (1888–1924)

Helen Smith Woodruff
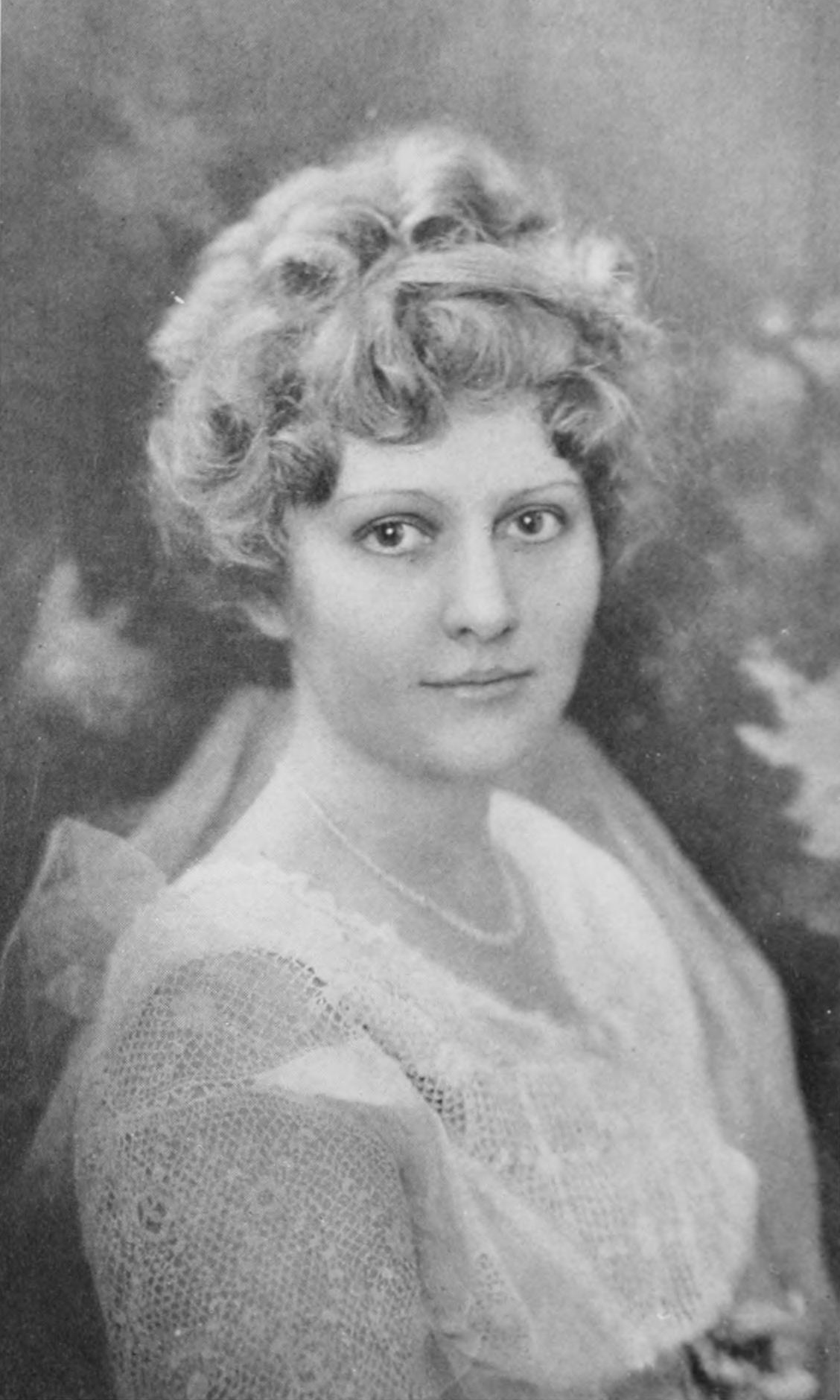
- Helen Smith Woodruff (c. 1915)
- Born: Helen Smith; June 7, 1888; Selma, Alabama, U.S.
- Died: October 14, 1924 (aged 36); Brooklyn, New York, U.S.
- Resting place: East Cemetery, Litchfield County, Connecticut, U.S.
- Education: Noble Institute, Anniston, Alabama
- Occupations: Author, playwright

Helen Smith Woodruff (June 7, 1888 – October 14, 1924) was an American author, playwright, and philanthropist. She wrote books for young adults and children. She set most of the stories in her native Southern United States and donated the proceeds from most of her books to charities. Her name was also spelled as Helen Smith–Woodruff.

== Life and career ==
Helen Smith was born on June 7, 1888, in Selma, Alabama, to parents Emma West Smith and Oscar Emmet Smith. She went to school in Anniston, Alabama, and attended a New York finishing school for two years.

In 1903 she met Lewis B. Woodruff, and a year later they were married. After her marriage, she moved to New York City, from where her husband originated.

Her works include Mis' Beauty (1911), The Little House (1914), Mr. Doctor Man (1915), The Imprisoned Freeman (1918) and What David did: love letters of two babies (1921). After completing Mis’ Beauty, she was afflicted with scarlet fever, which left her blind for several months. During this time, she wrote The Lady of the Lighthouse. It was the third best seller in 1913.

In 1918 she wrote the musical comedy play Hooray for the Girls while living in Ash Grove, her summer home in Litchfield, Connecticut.

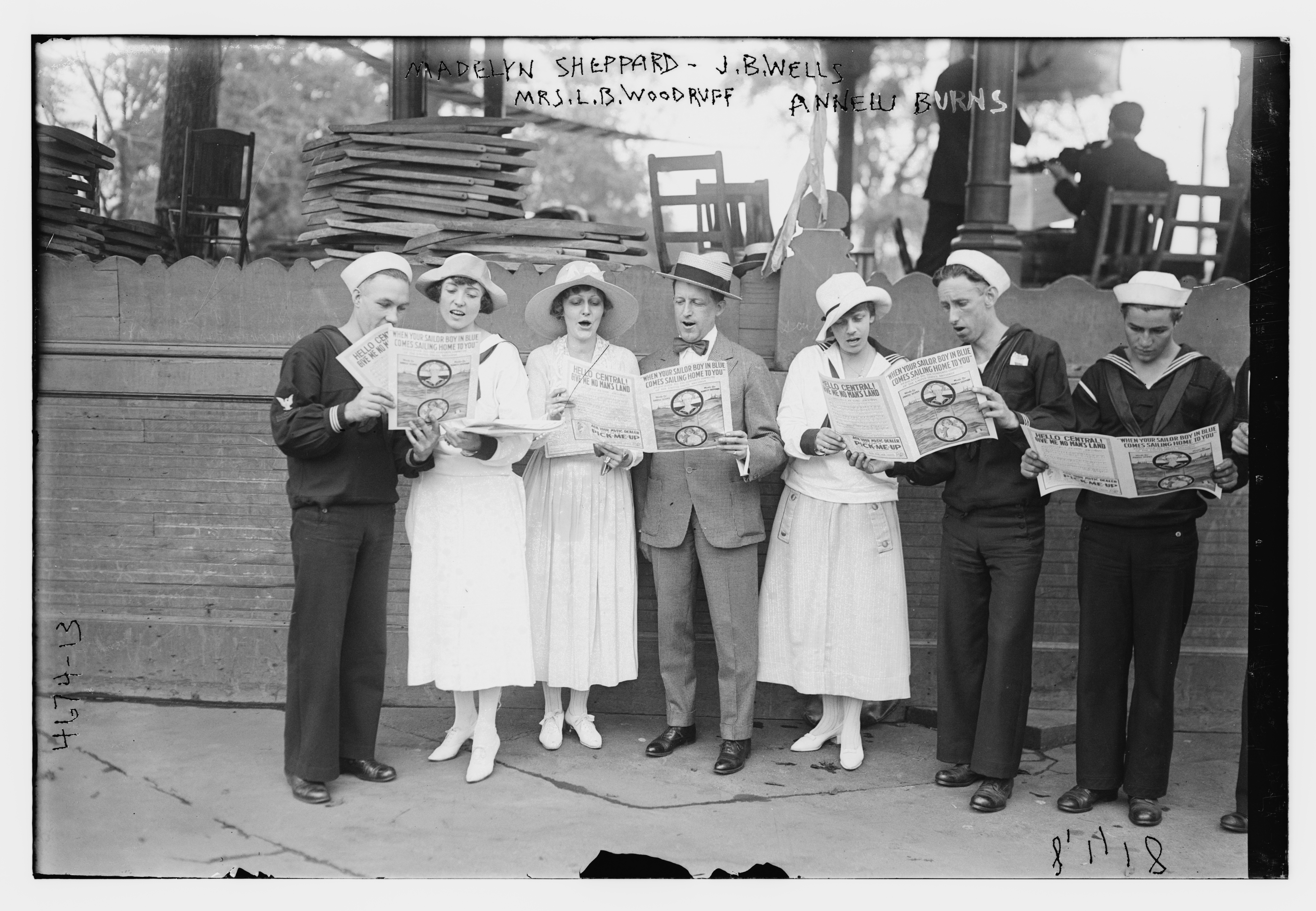
Madelyn Sheppard, John Barnes Wells, Helen Smith Woodruff, Annelu Burns (c. 1915)

She co-wrote the 1922 musical, Just Because. According to Cait Miller at the Library of Congress, the play "may well have been the first full-length Broadway musical authored entirely by women". Mrs. Woodruff was also a joint author in the libretto "Cash and Kisses", She also contributed poems and short stories for magazines and wrote lyrics for several songs. In the height of her youth, she was described as a blond of striking appearance and possessed of a lovable and attractive personality. Penrhyn Stanlaws declared her to be one of the most beautiful women in the world. Woodruff died on October 14, 1924. She had been ill for some time. While at her home at 14 East 68th Street, she fell out of her window to the pavement two stories below.

== Philanthropy ==
Helen Smith Woodruff donated the royalties from her story Mr. Doctor Man to Children's Hospital in Birmingham, Alabama.

The royalties from The Lady of the Lighthouse were donated to the New York Association for the blind.

Proceeds from Hooray for the Girls were given to American Committee for Devastated France.

Royalties from most of her other works, including Really Truly Nature Stories (1913), Really Truly Fairy Stories (1915), were given to the various institutions for the blind.
