= John Murray Anderson =

Canadian theatre director and producer

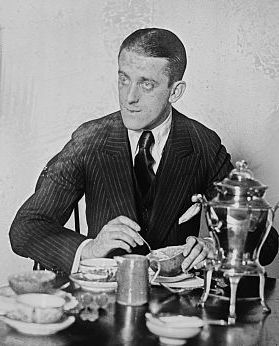
Anderson c. 1915–20

John Murray Anderson (September 20, 1886 – January 30, 1954) was a Canadian theatre director and producer, songwriter, actor, screenwriter, dancer and lighting designer, who made his career in the United States, primarily in New York City and Hollywood. He worked in almost every genre of show business, including vaudeville, Broadway, and film. He also directed plays in London.

== Early life and education ==
John Murray Anderson was born in 1886 in St. John's, Newfoundland, the son of Hon. John Anderson and his wife. His brother was Hugh Abercrombie Anderson. Anderson received his early education at Bishop Feild College in St. John's. He was sent to Europe for additional studies at Edinburgh Academy in Scotland, where he studied to be a chartered accountant. He entered college at the University of Lausanne in Switzerland. Later, he also studied singing with Sir Charles Santley and art with Sir Herbert Beerbohm Tree in London.

== Career ==
After completing studies in Europe, Anderson moved to New York City, where he became an antiques dealer. He sold collections he had accumulated in Newfoundland. This lasted a year; as Anderson said, he had "everything but customers" in his store.

In New York, Anderson quickly became involved in theatre, first as a dance instructor. He later became a writer and producer. He made his Broadway debut in 1919 wearing three hats, as writer, director, and producer of The Greenwich Village Follies of 1919. He subsequently produced new editions of The Greenwich Village Follies in each of the five succeeding years. In 1929, he would direct Murray Anderson's Almanac (1929).

In the 1920s and early 1930s, with Robert Milton, Anderson ran an acting school in Manhattan, teaching Bette Davis and Lucille Ball, among others. He and Davis remained good friends.

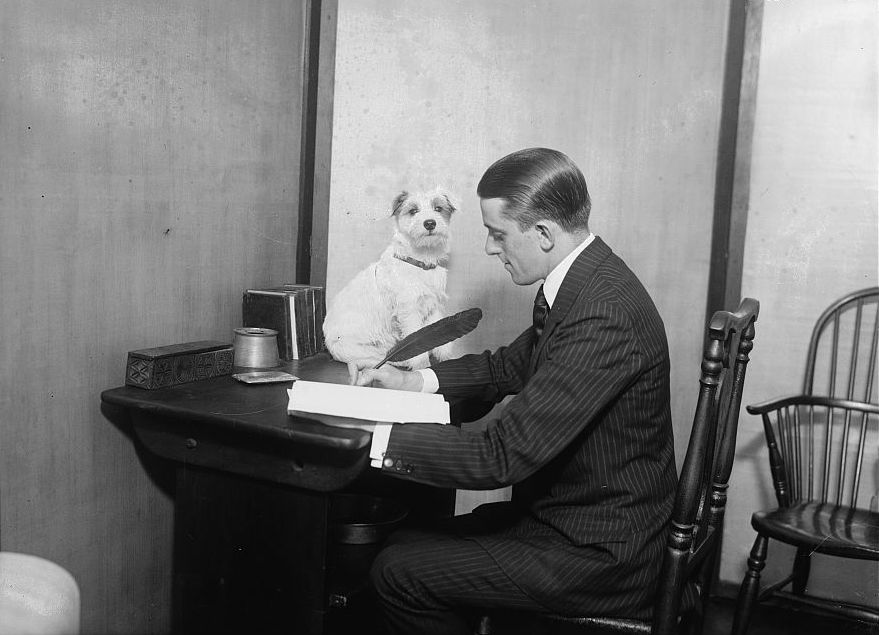
Anderson in 1918

Anderson produced the Ziegfeld Follies in 1934, 1936, and 1943, the Harold Arlen-Ira Gershwin-E. Y. Harburg revue Life Begins at 8:40 (1934), Billy Rose's Jumbo (1935), the series by Nancy Hamilton of One for the Money (1939), Two for the Show (1940), and Three to Make Ready (1946).

When his former student form his acting academy, Bette Davis, had to deal with her 1952 Broadway-bound revue Two's Company running into problems on the road, she hired Anderson to restage it. In that same year, he had produced New Faces of 1952. The following year, he would create a new version of his 1929 show with John Murray Anderson's Almanac (1953), which was his last production.

=== London stage ===
He also directed productions in London; in the West End, he directed The League of Notions, Bow Bells, and Fanfare.

=== Radio City Music Hall, revues, and various venues ===
Anderson worked as a director at Radio City Music Hall in 1933, as director of the Casa Mañana Revue at the Fort Worth Frontier Centennial in 1936, and at the Great Lakes Exposition in Cleveland, Ohio in 1937. He directed Billy Rose's Diamond Horseshoe from 1938 to 1950, and productions for Ringling Brothers Circus from 1942 to 1951.

=== Film ===
Anderson worked in Hollywood as well. He directed the film King of Jazz (1930), wrote the screenplay for Ziegfeld Follies (1946), directed the water ballets in Bathing Beauty (1944), and directed the circus sequences in The Greatest Show on Earth (1952), as well as had written the lyrics for the following songs in the film in collaboration with Henry Sullivan, many of which were performed off camera:

Song and Authorship
Picnic in the Park. From the film The Greatest Show on Earth. Words: John Murray Anderson, music: Henry Sullivan.	1951
You Can't Say Goodbye to Hawaii. From the motion picture entitled The Greatest Show on Earth. Words: John Murray Anderson, music: Henry Sullivan.	1951
Sing a Happy Song. From The Greatest Show on Earth. Words: John Murray Anderson, music: Henry Sullivan.	1952
Popcorn and Lemonade. From The Greatest Show on Earth. Words: John Murray Anderson, music: Henry Sullivan.	1952

== Marriage and family ==
In 1914, Anderson married Genevieve Lyon of Chicago; she died of tuberculosis in 1916. They had no children. Anderson regularly visited his family and friends in Newfoundland throughout his life.

== Autobiography ==
In the year before his death, Anderson collaborated with his brother Hugh as writer. He dictated his autobiography, Out Without My Rubbers, published posthumously in 1954. He died of a heart attack in New York City on January 30, 1954.

== In popular media ==
- Out Without My Rubbers (autobiography), 1954, New York: Library Publishers
- A musical about the life of John Murray Anderson called Impresario was written by Kyle McDavid and first performed at the LSPU Hall in St. John's, Newfoundland in May 2017.
