= William Davies King =

American professor

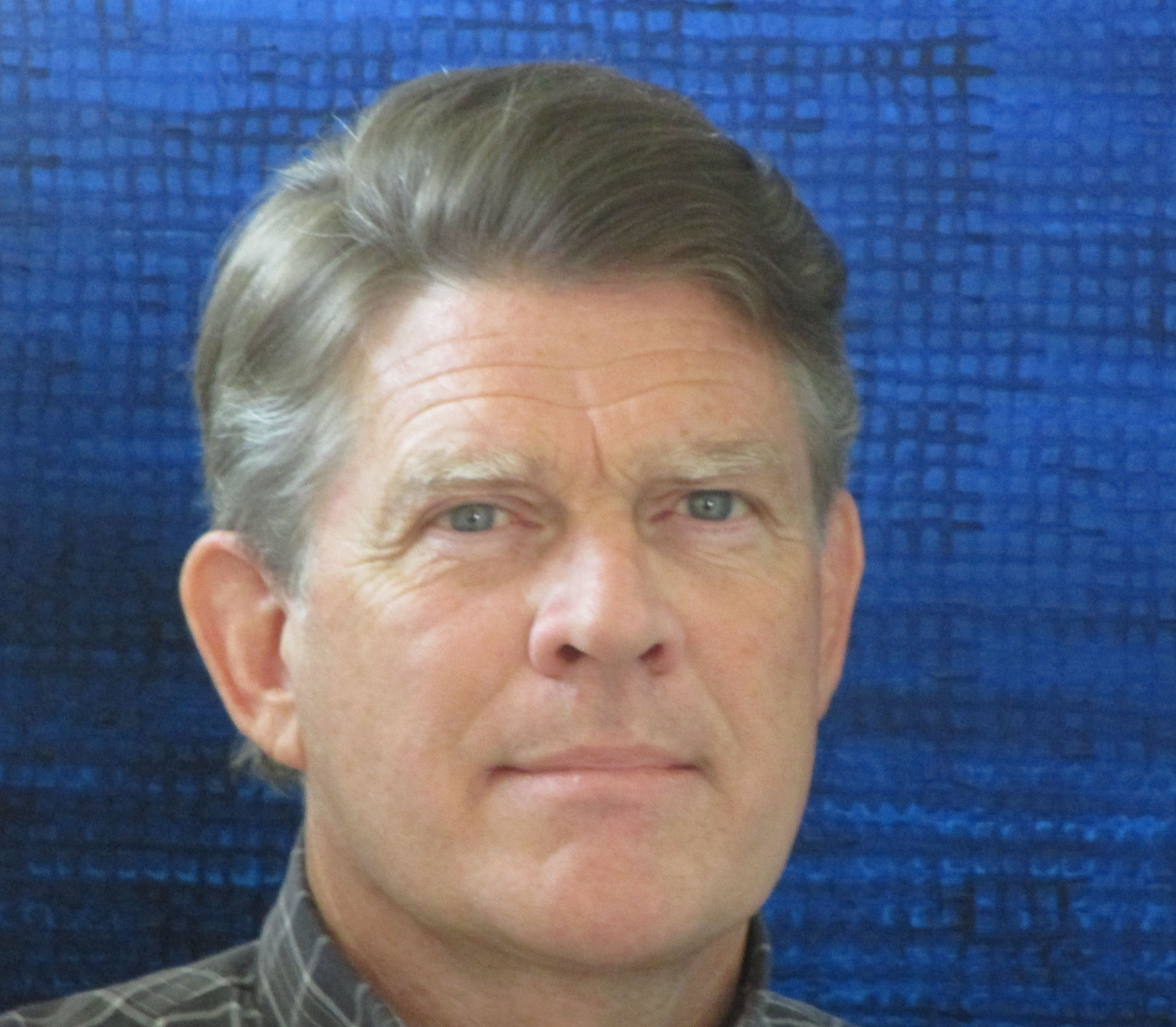
- Born: 1955 (age 70–71)
- Occupations: Theater historian, author, collage artist
- Title: Distinguished professor emeritus of theater and dance
- Awards: PROSE Award (2017)

Academic background
- Education: Yale University (BA, MFA, DFA)

Academic work
- Discipline: Theater history
- Institutions: University of California, Santa Barbara
- Main interests: Eugene O'Neill, late-Victorian theater, the psychology of collecting, collage
- Notable works: Henry Irving's "Waterloo" (1993); Collections of Nothing (2008); Long Day's Journey into Night: Critical Edition (2014)
- Website: williamdaviesking.com

William Davies King (born 1955) is an American theater historian, author, and collage artist. He is distinguished professor emeritus of theater and dance at the University of California, Santa Barbara (UCSB), where he taught from 1987 until his retirement in 2025.

King is best known as a scholar of the playwright Eugene O'Neill. He prepared critical editions of O'Neill's Long Day's Journey into Night (2014) and The Iceman Cometh (2020) for Yale University Press and edited the correspondence of O'Neill and his second wife, Agnes Boulton. He also wrote studies of O'Neill's marriages and late plays. His earlier work includes Henry Irving's "Waterloo" (1993), a study of late-Victorian English theater. In 1997, he wrote Writing Wrongs, a book-length study of the playwright Wallace Shawn. A multimedia edition of Long Day's Journey into Night that King edited received the 2017 PROSE Award in Literature.

King is also known for his memoir Collections of Nothing (2008) and for an altered-book art practice he calls "bibliolage" or "hyper-illuminated books," which has been shown in exhibitions in Santa Barbara County, New Orleans, and Montreal.

== Early life and education ==
King was raised in Canton, Ohio, and attended Phillips Academy in Andover. He encountered O'Neill's work as a teenager. He graduated from Yale College in 1977 and earned an MFA in 1981 and DFA in 1983 from the Yale School of Drama.

== Career ==
Early in his career, King worked as literary manager of the American National Theater at the John F. Kennedy Center for the Performing Arts. He joined the faculty of the University of California, Santa Barbara, in 1987 and was later appointed distinguished professor of theater and dance.

His first book, Henry Irving's "Waterloo" was published in 1993. It examined the conflict in late-Victorian English theater between actor-centered and playwright-centered drama. The book focused on the actor Henry Irving's production of Arthur Conan Doyle's play Waterloo and George Bernard Shaw's attack on it in the Saturday Review. In the Victorian Review, Barry O'Connor wrote that the book advanced a neo-historical methodology offering new directions for theater historians, and praised King's writing as comprehensible and free of jargon. Reviewing the book in Victorian Studies, Robertson Davies found that King presented the Shaw–Irving conflict in detail and with a generally fair hand. He welcomed the book as a contribution to the continuing dispute between playwrights' theatre and actors' theater, while cautioning that it should not be regarded as the final word. He also added that King at times overlooked the practical realities of the working theater. In The Sewanee Review, Gerald Weales was more critical. He admired the scholarly ingenuity of the book's individual chapters, but likened its overall structure to ornate boxes balanced on too small a base. He further added that the argument would collapse if pressed. Weales concluded that King was more interested in his Walter Benjamin–influenced method of historical inquiry than in his ostensible subject. The book received the Joe A. Callaway Prize for best book on theater in 1994.

His second book, Writing Wrongs: The Work of Wallace Shawn was published in 1997, with a foreword by John Lahr. The book was a critical study of the plays, screenplays, and acting career of Wallace Shawn. Reviewing it in Theatre Journal, Beth Schachter praised the book as an excellent study that showed why Shawn's demanding theater merited book-length treatment. However, she found his comparisons between Shawn and Eugene O'Neill of limited value and suggested that King's argument for the radical character of Shawn's plays would have been strengthened by comparison with contemporary playwrights such as Sam Shepard and María Irene Fornés. Library Journal recommended the book for academic and large public libraries, describing it as an absorbing study of Shawn and his work.

=== Eugene O'Neill scholarship ===
Much of King's scholarship concerns Eugene O'Neill and the influence of O'Neill's second and third wives on his work. He edited A Wind Is Rising: The Correspondence of Agnes Boulton and Eugene O'Neill, a collection of the letters exchanged between O'Neill and Agnes Boulton during their marriage. Reviewing it in The Review of English Studies, Gavin Cologne-Brookes wrote that the correspondence shed new light on a key period of O'Neill's life. He credited King's commentary with showing how the couple were acting out parts in their own domestic drama on some level. Ronald Wainscott, in Theatre Survey, welcomed the long-delayed publication of the letters. He further credited King with handling the difficult task of dating and transcribing the largely undated, handwritten correspondence, but found the letters themselves often repetitious. Wainscott felt that King overstated Boulton's accomplishments as a writer, and noted a factual error in King's dating of O'Neill's play The Fountain. In The Modern Language Review, Steven Price praised King's introduction as full and revealing, but argued that King gave too much value to what were often little more than hastily constructed notes. He concluded that the volume would appeal mostly to readers seeking every scrap of material about O'Neill.

In the monograph Another Part of a Long Story: Literary Traces of Eugene O'Neill and Agnes Boulton King examined the marriage of O'Neill and Boulton. He read the couple's writings for traces of their relationship and argued that Boulton was an essential presence throughout O'Neill's writing career rather than merely a transitional figure between his early life and his later marriage to Carlotta Monterey. Reviewing it in Modern Drama, Tamsen Wolff described the book as the first considered account of the O'Neill–Boulton marriage. She praised King's reclamation of Boulton as a writer in her own right. However, she found the connections King drew between the couple's lives and their literary work often tenuous, and questioned whether establishing such links was ultimately useful for understanding the plays. Writing in the Eugene O'Neill Review, Kurt Eisen called the book a thoroughly researched and sensitive account. He credited King with challenging the prevailing view that Carlotta was the dominant influence on O'Neill's work. Choice described it as a welcome addition to O'Neill scholarship that did not gloss over O'Neill's failings as a husband and father. King also edited a new edition of Boulton's memoir Part of a Long Story: Eugene O'Neill as a Young Man in Love (McFarland, 2011). It restored passages cut from the 1958 original and added explanatory notes.

King edited a critical edition of O'Neill's Long Day's Journey into Night (2014). Reviewing it in the Eugene O'Neill Review, Zander Brietzke questioned at the outset whether another edition of such a frequently reprinted play was needed. However, he concluded that the volume's value lay in King's supporting apparatus, including an annotated bibliography, notes on the play's literary allusions, an essay on historical and critical perspectives, and a discussion of the 2002 Goodman Theatre production directed by Robert Falls. A subsequent multimedia edition, published in 2016, incorporated photographs, critical essays, video clips of the play in performance, and audio recordings of O'Neill reading from the work. It drew on the O'Neill collections at the Beinecke Rare Book & Manuscript Library and was released alongside a 2016 Broadway revival starring Jessica Lange, who wrote the preface. It received the 2017 PROSE Award in Literature. He also edited a critical edition of The Iceman Cometh, adding textual notes, a glossary, character studies, production history, and an essay on the play's historical and critical context. Reviewing it in the Eugene O'Neill Review, Robert Baker-White wrote that the edition guided the reader through the complexity of O'Neill's text in masterful fashion. She further credited King with resisting the temptation to tie the play too closely to O'Neill's own biography.

Finding the Way to 'Long Day's Journey Into Night': Eugene O'Neill and Carlotta Monterey O'Neill at Tao House was published in 2024. In it, King used the diaries of O'Neill and his third wife, Carlotta Monterey, to argue that Monterey and the household she created at Tao House played a role in the writing of the play. Reviewing it in The Wall Street Journal, Rachel Shteir praised King's knowledge of O'Neill and his analyses of the plays. She and highlighted the book's format, which sets King's narrative against facing-page diary entries from O'Neill and Monterey. The book was also reviewed by Katie Johnson in the Eugene O'Neill Review, who called it a major scholarly contribution to United States drama and history.

King was editor of the Eugene O'Neill Review for six years during the 2010s. He was a Travis Bogard Artist in Residence at Tao House in 2018. He has worked as dramaturg on O'Neill productions, including a staging of Long Day's Journey into Night at the Geffen Playhouse in Los Angeles. His play Into Night: A Day at Tao House, which dramatizes the writing of Long Day's Journey, received staged readings at the Eugene O'Neill National Historic Site and at the International Conference of the Eugene O'Neill Society in Boston in 2022.

== Collecting and Collections of Nothing ==
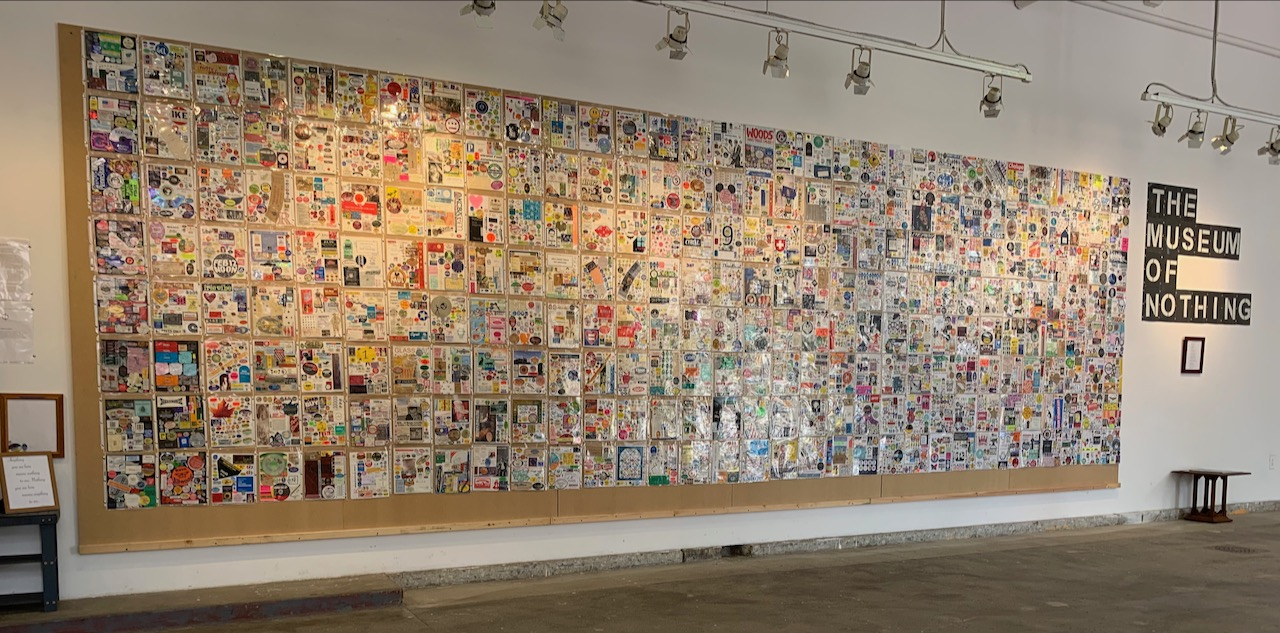
One half of the so-called Kitchen Collection of William Davies King, on display in The Museum of Nothing, at the Red Barn Gallery, UCSB, June–July 2023.

King is a longtime collector of ephemera and packaging, including around 2,300 cereal boxes, also large numbers of product labels, envelope linings, fruit stickers, bottle caps, and other discarded printed material. He has described these as "collections of nothing," meaning things of no outward value. He has connected the practice to the Dada tradition in modern art. His 2008 memoir Collections of Nothing combined an account of his collections with a reflection on the psychology of collecting. Reviewing it for the Chicago Tribune, Julia Keller called the book extraordinary. She described it as a memoir told through the objects King collects and through his idea that collecting is a way of coming to terms with the strangeness of the world. In The Journal of Modern Craft, the sociologist Gary Alan Fine described it as a strange and joyous volume. He called it a work of writerly elegance, and drew from it the argument that collections are fundamentally biographical, while observing that King builds a collection without quite building a community. In Ploughshares, the book was described as a memoir of unexpected beauty rooted in honest emotional self-examination. Writing for PopMatters, David Banash described the book as drawing the reader into the ordinary objects of everyday life. (Note: Banash includes further discussion of the book in his book Collage Culture: Readymades, Meaning, and the Age of Consumption.) In The New York Times Book Review, Henry Alford called the book, "a wonderfully frank and engaging look at one man's detritus-fueled pathology," and wrote that "King’s honesty and ambivalence about his pastime only increases his emotional connection to the reader. I wanted, by turns, to breast-feed and strangle him."

In June 2019, King presented Tree of Life: A Performance Event at UC Santa Barbara. In the display, he arranged his cereal box collection on a dance studio floor as a mandala in the shape of a tree. In 2023, he installed The Museum of Nothing, a two-part exhibition of roughly 10,000 items from his collections, at the Red Barn art gallery on the UC Santa Barbara campus. Earlier, from 2020 to 2022, the UCSB Library hosted The Creative Edge of Collecting, an exhibition of his collections.

== Bibliolage ==
Since the early 2000s, King has produced altered books he calls "bibliolages" or "hyper-illuminated books," collaging found imagery and text into discarded books. Works include pieces titled Condoleezza Rice Liberace, Big Farmer Big Jesus, and Red Army Uniforms of World War II. His works were featured in an exhibition at the Kolaj Fest in New Orleans in 2019 Montreal in 2025, and in the catalogue: Cultural Deconstructions: Critical Issues in Collage.

His book art has been shown in group exhibitions in Santa Barbara County, including ReOpening The Book at the Elverhøj Museum of History and Art in Solvang, California in 2018, where he gave an artist presentation, and Cut and Paste: Collage in Santa Barbara at the Arts Fund Gallery later that year. Reviewing his work for the Santa Barbara News-Press, the art critic Josef Woodard characterized King as a "shamelessly entertaining book vandal with a cause," describing how King pastes mythic, religious, and art-historical imagery into existing books, reconstituting rather than defacing them.

== Selected works ==
- King, W. D. (1993). Henry Irving's "Waterloo": Theatrical Engagements with Arthur Conan Doyle, George Bernard Shaw, Ellen Terry, Edward Gordon Craig, Late-Victorian Culture, Assorted Ghosts, Old Men, War, and History. Berkeley: University of California Press. ISBN 978-0-520-08072-0.
- King, William Davies (1997). Writing Wrongs: The Work of Wallace Shawn. Philadelphia: Temple University Press. ISBN 978-1566395175.
- King, William Davies, ed. (2000). "A Wind Is Rising": The Correspondence of Agnes Boulton and Eugene O'Neill. Madison, NJ: Fairleigh Dickinson University Press.
- King, William Davies (2008). Collections of Nothing. Chicago: University of Chicago Press. ISBN 978-0-226-43700-2.
- King, William Davies (2010). Another Part of a Long Story: Literary Traces of Eugene O'Neill and Agnes Boulton. Ann Arbor: University of Michigan Press. ISBN 978-0-472-11717-8.
- O'Neill, Eugene (2014). King, William Davies (ed.). Long Day's Journey Into Night: Critical Edition. New Haven: Yale University Press. ISBN 978-0-300-18641-3.
- O'Neill, Eugene (2016). King, William Davies (ed.). Long Day's Journey Into Night: Multimedia Edition. New Haven: Yale University Press.
- O'Neill, Eugene (2020). King, William Davies (ed.). The Iceman Cometh: Critical Edition. New Haven: Yale University Press. ISBN 978-0-300-21185-6.
- King, William Davies (2024). Finding the Way to 'Long Day's Journey Into Night': Eugene O'Neill and Carlotta Monterey O'Neill at Tao House. London: Anthem Press.
