= James Light (director) =

American theater director (1894–1964)

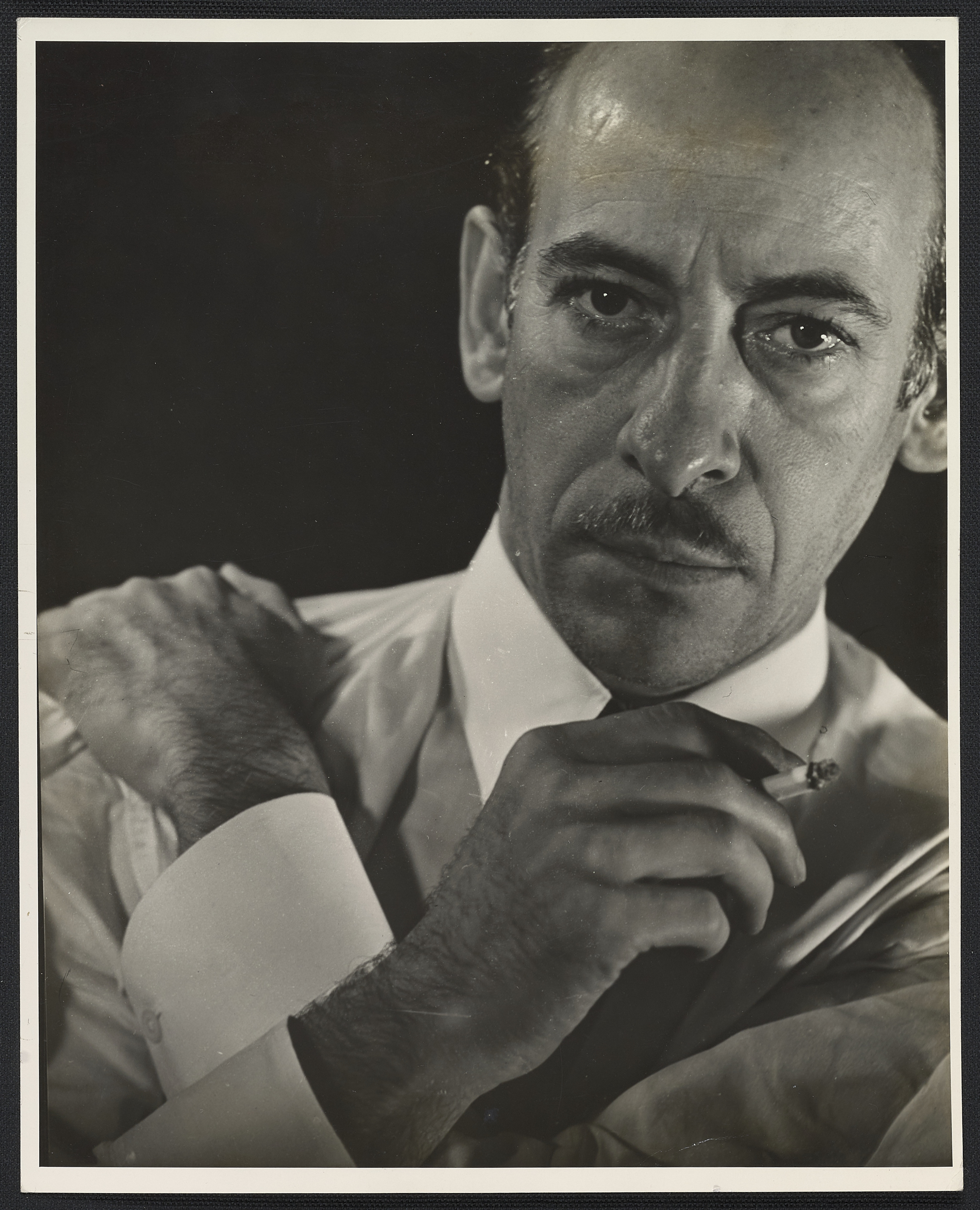
1938 photograph of James Light by the Federal Theatre Project

James Light (1894 – February 11, 1964) was an American theatre director, actor, and educator. He is best remembered as a champion of the playwright Eugene O'Neill, and he directed many of his plays both on Broadway and in regional theaters. He was a member of the Provincetown Players, and he succeeded George Cram Cook as director of that organization in 1922. During the Great Depression, he was director of the "Philadelphia Black Unit" of the Federal Theatre Project; an organization dedicated to fighting racial discrimination in hiring practices in the American theatre by producing plays with all-black casts. He taught on the faculties of the Yale School of Drama and The New School for Social Research; serving as the dean of the drama school at the latter institution from 1939 to 1942.

== Early life and education ==
Born in Pittsburgh, Pennsylvania in 1894, Light was the son of an English building contractor who was working on a project in Pittsburgh at the time of Light's birth. He returned to England with his parents while still an infant and did not return to the United States until he was fourteen years old. He graduated from Peabody High School where he befriended his classmate Kenneth Burke who later became a prominent literary theorist.

Light began his college education at the Carnegie Institute of Technology in painting and architecture. He ultimately abandoned his studies in art and transferred to Ohio State University (OSU) where he graduated with degrees in English literature and philosophy. He was a swimmer on the OSU swim team, and also served as editor of the OSU magazine Sansculotte.

In 1917 Light graduated from OSU and moved to New York City after earning a scholarship to pursue graduate studies in philosophy at Columbia University. He was later awarded a Guggenheim Fellowship in 1929 which allowed him to pursue further studies in drama in Europe.

== Actor and director ==
Light's first apartment building in New York housed three members of the Provincetown Players, one of them Eugene O'Neill, and he met them on his first day in New York City while moving into the building. These relationships led him to join the Provincetown Players as an actor; beginning with the role of the English teacher in Susan Glaspell's Close the Book. He went on to portray 33 more roles with the company, and was ultimately made a member of the executive committee managing the theatre troupe. In 1922 he succeeded George Cram Cook as director of Provincetown Players, and along with O'Neill, Kenneth Macgowan, and Robert Edmond Jones was instrumental in transforming that group of creatives into the Experimental Theatre, Inc. in 1923.

Light made his Broadway debut as an actor on February 4, 1921; portraying Captain Caleb Williams in the original production of O'Neill's Diff'rent at the Princess Theatre. He starred in only one more play on Broadway, the role of Baron Skansenkorge in August Strindberg's The Spook Sonata (1923), before completely re-orienting his career away from acting into directing. The first play he directed on Broadway was O'Neill's All God's Chillun Got Wings in 1924. The play featured an interracial couple with the black actor Paul Robeson in the role of Jim Harris opposite the white actress Mary Blair in the role of his wife Ella Downey. The decision by O'Neill and Light to portray a racially mixed couple was controversial for the time period, and both men received threats from the Ku Klux Klan and poison pen letters.

Light's other Broadway credits as director include Hatcher Hughes's Ruint (1925), William Shakespeare's Hamlet (1925), Strindberg's The Dream Play (1926), O'Neill's The Great God Brown (1926), O'Neill's The Emperor Jones (1926), Mrs. Henry Wood's East Lynne (1926), Lajos Egri's Rapid Transit (1927), E.E. Cummings's Him (1928), Kenneth Raisbeck's Rock Me, Julie (1931), Archibald MacLeish's Panic (1935), Virgil Geddes's Native Ground (1937), Pedro Calderón de la Barca's The Mayor of Zalamea (1945), and Sophocles's Oedipus Rex (1945) among others.

An opponent of racial discrimination, Light was appointed Director of the "Philadelphia Black Unit" of the Federal Theatre Project (FTP) in 1936; a branch of the FTP whose mission was to create employment opportunities for black performers to combat institutional racism in the American theatre. He was appointed to that post by actress Rose McClendon who oversaw FTP's African American theatre units nationally. Light had worked with McClendon earlier when he directed her in the Broadway production of Annie Nathan Meyer's anti-racism drama Black Souls in 1932; a work which centered around the lynching of an innocent black man on the campus of a college in the American south.

Working closely with Jasper Deeter and the Hedgerow Theatre among other Philadelphia impresarios, Light directed, produced, and promoted numerous plays with all-black casts in Philadelphia during the mid to late 1930s through his work with the FTP. He continued to pursue other projects to promote black artists after the Great Depression. His final directing assignment on Broadway was a revival of Aristophanes's Lysistrata at the Belasco Theatre that starred an all-black cast led by Etta Moten Barnett in the title role and Sidney Poitier as Polydorus in 1946.

== Educator ==
In 1928 Light was appointed director of the Yale Dramatic Association at the Yale School of Drama. He joined the faculty of The New School for Social Research (NSSR) in the 1930s, and ultimately became the Dean of NSSR's School of Drama from 1939 to 1942.

== Personal life and death ==
Light was married twice. His first marriage to Sue Jenkins ended in divorce. His second marriage was to Patti Margolies. He died at the age of 69 at his home in Manhattan on February 11, 1964.
