= Agnes Boulton =

Pulp fiction writer (1893–1968)

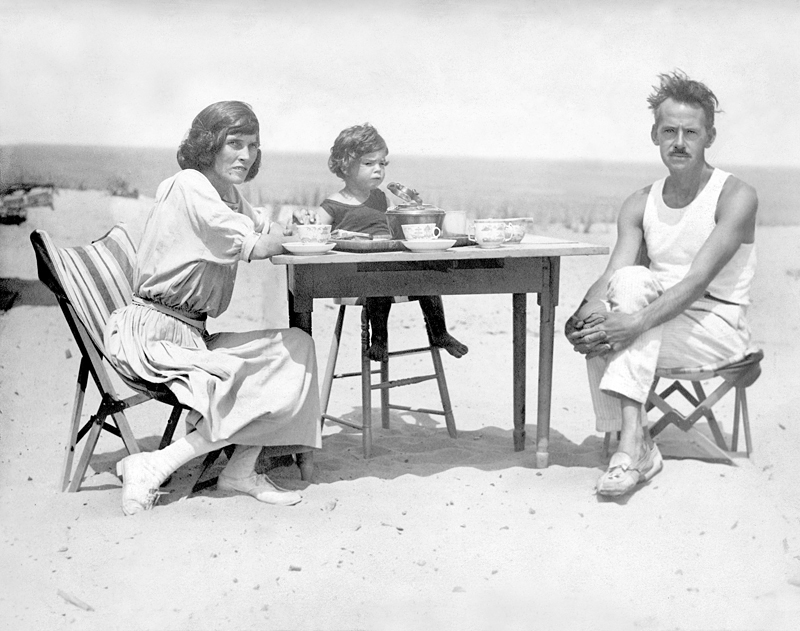
- Boulton with husband Eugene O'Neill and son Shane, photographed in Cape Cod in 1922
- Born: Agnes Ruby Boulton; September 19, 1893; London, England
- Died: November 25, 1968 (aged 75); Point Pleasant, New Jersey, U.S.
- Occupation: Pulp-fiction writer
- Spouse: Eugene O'Neill (m. 1918; div. 1929)
- Children: 3, including Oona O'Neill
- Relatives: Eugene O'Neill Jr. (step-son); Charlie Chaplin (son in-law); Geraldine Chaplin (granddaughter); Oona Chaplin (great-granddaughter)

Agnes Ruby Boulton (September 19, 1893 – November 25, 1968) was a British-born American pulp magazine writer in the 1910s, later the wife of Eugene O'Neill.

== Life and career ==
Boulton was born Agnes Ruby Boulton in 1893 in London, England, the daughter of Cecil Maud (née Williams) and Edward William Boulton, an artist. She grew up in Philadelphia and later in West Point Pleasant, New Jersey. She gave birth to a daughter, Barbara Burton, in 1914; she claimed to have married a man named Burton who had died, but later admitted that this was a falsehood.

Boulton met O'Neill in the fall of 1917 in the Golden Swan Saloon, better known as The Hell Hole, in Greenwich Village. They married some six months later, on April 12, 1918, at Provincetown, Massachusetts.

O'Neill, at the time, was considered a promising author of one-act plays. During the first year of their marriage, he wrote Beyond the Horizon, his first full-length, Broadway play, which won the Pulitzer Prize in 1920. During the early years of the marriage, Boulton modified her writing and had two stories published by The Smart Set, an important magazine co-edited by H. L. Mencken and George Jean Nathan.

She gave birth to Shane O'Neill in 1919 and Oona O'Neill in 1925. The marriage came to an end when O'Neill left Boulton for the actress Carlotta Monterey in 1928, and they divorced in 1929. The Boulton/O'Neill marriage has been studied and written about by William Davies King, professor of theater at UC Santa Barbara, in "Another Part of a Long Story: Literary Traces of Eugene O'Neill and Agnes Boulton" (Michigan 2010).

Her daughter, Oona O'Neill, married Charlie Chaplin in 1943 at the age of 18 (he was 54), and moved to Switzerland with him nine years later, renouncing her American citizenship.

== Late career publications ==
Boulton published a novel, The Road Is Before Us, in 1944, and a memoir of the first two years of her marriage to O'Neill in 1958, entitled Part of a Long Story. The memoir gives a portrayal of an odd literary marriage at its inception. A new and annotated version of that book was published by McFarland in 2011. A selection of her stories can be found on eOneill.com.

== Death ==
Boulton died on November 25, 1968 in West Point Pleasant, New Jersey.

== Posthumous publications ==
Contrary to the terms of the 1929 divorce settlement, Boulton had saved most of her letters to and from O'Neill, as well as some O'Neill manuscripts, including "Exorcism," a one-act play by O'Neill, which was thought to have been destroyed but had been given by Boulton to a friend, screenwriter-producer Philip Yordan. It was published in the October 17, 2011, issue of The New Yorker.

The O'Neill/Boulton correspondence was published in 2000 by Fairleigh Dickinson University Press in a volume called A Wind Is Rising. For a full biographical study of Boulton, see William Davies King, "Another Part of a Long Story: Literary Traces of Eugene O'Neill and Agnes Boulton" (Ann Arbor: University of Michigan Press, 2010). .
