= Lazarus Laughed =

Lazarus Laughed is a play by Eugene O'Neill written in 1925. Its sub-title was A Play for Imaginative Theatre. It is a long theo-philosophical meditation with more than a hundred actors making up a masked chorus. In theatrical format, Lazarus Laughed appears to be a Greek tragedy. But the underlying message is similar to the mystery plays from the Middle Ages. O'Neill's play, The Great God Brown, can be considered as an introduction to this play.

== Story ==
The story features characters and events following the raising of Lazarus of Bethany from the dead by Jesus.

As Lazarus is the first man to return from the realm of the dead, the crowd reacts intently to his words. Over and over again he declares to them that there is no death – only God’s eternal laughter. The more Lazarus laughs, the younger and stronger he becomes. The more he laughs, the older and weaker his wife Miriam (who trusts him but does not understand his laughter) becomes.

The subsequent scenes portray a series of tests (perhaps similar to those trials of Job) by the Jews, Romans and Greeks to try the faith of Lazarus. Consequently, members of his family are taken from him, but Lazarus continues always to laugh, even as Miriam is poisoned by the Roman Emperor Tiberius and continuing on to the very end, when Tiberius burns him at the stake.

== Acts and Scenes ==
- Act One, Scenes One and Two take place in Bethany.
- Act Two, Scene One takes place in Athens. Scene Two is in Rome.
- Act Three, Scenes One and Two are in Tiberius' palace.
- Act Four, Scene One is still in Tiberius' palace. Scene Two is in the interior of a Roman theatre.

== Production history ==
Since the play was first published, it has hardly ever been produced in major theatre venues. The Pasadena Community Playhouse (Pasadena Community Players) staged the only major production of it, and its world premiere, in 1928, with 151 actors and 420 roles, including Irving Pichel as the title character.

The smaller scale, but still sizeable, European premiere was staged in 1971 by the American Repertory Theater in Europe (ARTE) with a cast of over 40 mostly student actors performing 150 different roles. "For a bit of extra strength the title role (was) entrusted to Paul Abbott of the American Conservatory Theater in San Francisco." This touring production was performed (in English) in several ancient outdoor amphitheaters in Italy, including the Teatro Grande in the ruins of Pompeii, Teatro Romano in Verona, and the magnificent Greco-Roman Teatro Antico in Taormina, Sicily. Performances were also given in the Teatro Romano in Fiesole (near Florence) & Villa Negrone in Lugano, Switzerland. The production attracted large audiences and garnered rave reviews from major Italian newspapers.

== Quotations ==
- "Tragic is the plight of the tragedian whose only audience is himself! Life is for each man a solitary cell whose walls are mirrors. Terrified is Caligula by the faces he makes! But I tell you to laugh in the mirror, that seeing your life gay, you may begin to live as a guest, and not as a condemned one!"—Act II, Scene I.

== Bibliography ==
- Bogard, Travis, "Contour in Time", New York: Oxford University Press, 1972, Revised Edition, 1988. Chapter on "Lazarus Laughed", Chapter VII, The Triumvirate, 2 (1921–1926). An Excerpt follows below.
  Lazarus Laughed is a play which answers in all particulars to this faith. It attempts to visualize with intensity a religious spirit that O’Neill had perceived dimly all his life. Lazarus, characterized early in the play as a man who in life was nothing but a bungling farmer, is reminiscent of Robert Mayo, but now transformed and exalted by his journey beyond the farthest horizon. Caligula, deformed, ape-like in his antics, is a distillation of other spiritually deformed characters with whom O’Neill has been concerned—the Hairy Ape, Marco, with his spiritual hump, the capering Billy Brown. Tiberius Caesar, Pompeia and Miriam also bring into sharp focus in a specifically religious context human characteristics in which, earlier, O’Neill has sensed a "faint indication" of spirit.
- Clark, Barrett H. (November 1932). "Aeschylus and O'Neill". The English Journal. XXI (9): 699–710. doi:10.2307/804473. JSTOR 804473. Cf. p. 700 and onwards for "Lazarus Laughed" commentary.
  In Lazarus Laughed, however, we have a positive and joyous assertion of the will to live, a proclamation made by an idealistic prophet who is tortured by no doubts, a man so sure of his message that he has actually banished death from his world; but O'Neill took care to put this prophet into a world two thousand years younger than it is now. Lazarus Laughed is not life; it is the playwright's dream between an earlier and later hell on earth.
- Floyd, Virginia. (editor) (1979). Eugene O'Neill: A World View. Frederick Unger. ISBN 0-8044-2204-4. Cf pp. 255–256 on Lazarus Laughed, in the chapter "O'Neill, the Humanist" by Esther M. Jackson.
- Floyd, Virginia. (1985). The Plays of Eugene O'Neill: A New Assessment. Frederick Unger. ISBN 0-8044-2206-0. Cf. pp. 319–333, on "Lazarus Laughed", in Chapter 2, "The Mariner's Horizon: Experimental Plays and Maturation".
- Wainscott, Ronald H. (1988). Staging O'Neill: The Experimental Years. Yale University Press. ISBN 0-300-04152-7.
- Winther, Sophus Keith. (1934). Eugene O'Neill: A Critical Study. Random House.
