= Diff'rent =

1921 play by Eugene O'Neill

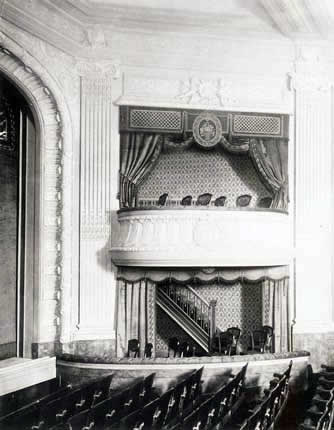
- The Princess Theatre.; Diff'rent premiered at this theatre in 1921.
- Written by: Eugene O'Neill
- Characters: Emma; Captain Caleb; Benny
- Original language: English
- Genre: Tragedy
- Setting: The parlor of a home in a New England Seaside Village. 1890 and 1920

Premiere
- Date premiered: April 4, 1921
- Place premiered: Princess Theatre on Broadway, United States

Diff'rent is a two-act tragedy written by American playwright Eugene O'Neill. The story concerns a woman who rejects her fiancée over a single act of infidelity and later becomes engaged to another man who turns out to have poor character. The first man commits suicide, and she regrets her choice.

The play premiered in 1921 at the Princess Theatre on Broadway, when theatres reopened following closures due to the Spanish flu. Captain Caleb was played by James Light in the original 1921 production.

A second production ran on Broadway in 1938.

== Background ==
The Spanish flu ended officially in 1920, the year before the play premiered and for the year that Act II of the play is taking place. World War I had ended three years earlier, in 1918.

The Roaring Twenties was at its dawn. Flapper became a new word in the U.S. vocabulary, which according to Webster's Dictionary was "a young girl, esp. one somewhat daring in conduct, speech and dress,".

Young women in the audience may have seen a world in 1921 where the men who were possible candidates for marriage were tending to be either older or younger than the women seeking husbands. It was known at the time that the Spanish Flu and World War I had altered the U.S. gender ratio, with more young women being in the population than young men, for the age range of 20–40. This was largely due to the Spanish Flu having increased the mortality rates for men from 20 to 40. Like COVID, the Spanish Flu caused people to stay isolated in their homes. The end of the pandemic allowed people to socialize again.

The title of the show Diff'rent makes use of the way people speak in the village. Making use of the way a certain community spoke was a device often used in O'Neill plays.

== Plot ==
=== Act I ===
Setting: The parlor of home on a side street of a seaport village in New England in 1890.

Emma is engaged to an older man, a sea captain named Caleb. She discovers that he was briefly unfaithful while at sea and calls off the wedding. In the seaport village, the women tended to accept the promiscuity of the men who work at sea. Emma however, expected her future husband to be of different nature than the sailors in the village.

=== Act II ===
Setting: The same location in 1920.

30 years go by, but the ageing sea captain still hopes that he can marry his former fiancé from 1890, Emma. Caleb's sister Harriet and her husband, Alfred, have raised their son Benny, who has now returned to the seaside from a tour of duty in World War I, where he had been stationed in France. Benny becomes good friends with Emma, who he sometimes calls Aunt Emma.

On the stage, the audience sees that Benny is having various financial problems and has hatched a plan. However, the audience does not know what it is.

Emma does not know that Benny was actually a grifter and charlatan. Caleb later arrives and notices how her home has changed. Emma explains that in the last two weeks, the "gloomy and old-timey" look of the house started to bother her so changed the style to "light and airy and young-looking".

Caleb explains to Emma Benny's real character, his dishonesty and so on. Caleb also points out that he, however, has always been honest with her, especially after expressing regret for the unfortunate act. Emma declares that she is going to marry Benny. Caleb, clearly upset, tells Emma that he would rather pay Benny to cancel the wedding than see Emma suffer with a terrible mistake. Caleb tells Emma that he had always thought she was "diff'rent" than the rest of the people in the village. However, he now finds her the same as everyone else, but just more mentally ill.

After Caleb leaves, Benny returns. Benny tells Emma that he will take the bribe from Caleb to not marry her. Benny was using Emma as if she were property that he could negotiate with. Emma is overwhelmed with shock of Benny explaining this to her.

Emma later learns of Caleb's suicide, and she begins to exit, intending to join Caleb.

== Productions ==
=== Premiere ===
Diff'rent premiered on April 4, 1921, at the Princess Theatre on Broadway. It was the first show for the theatre after what were called the Princess Musicals, a series of musicals that took place in the theater from 1913 to 1918. The theater had been closed during the Spanish Flu pandemic and reopened with Diff'rent. Emma was played by Mary Blair, Caleb by James Light, and Benny by Charles Eliis.

=== 1938 Broadway revival ===
A second production took place at Maxine Elliott's Theatre on Broadway, opening on January 25, 1938. Leonore Sorsby was Emma, Erford Gage was Caleb, and Frank Daly was Benny.
