= Eugene O'Neill National Historic Site =

National Historic Site of the United States

- Tao House
- U.S. National Register of Historic Places
- U.S. National Historic Landmark
- U.S. National Historic Site
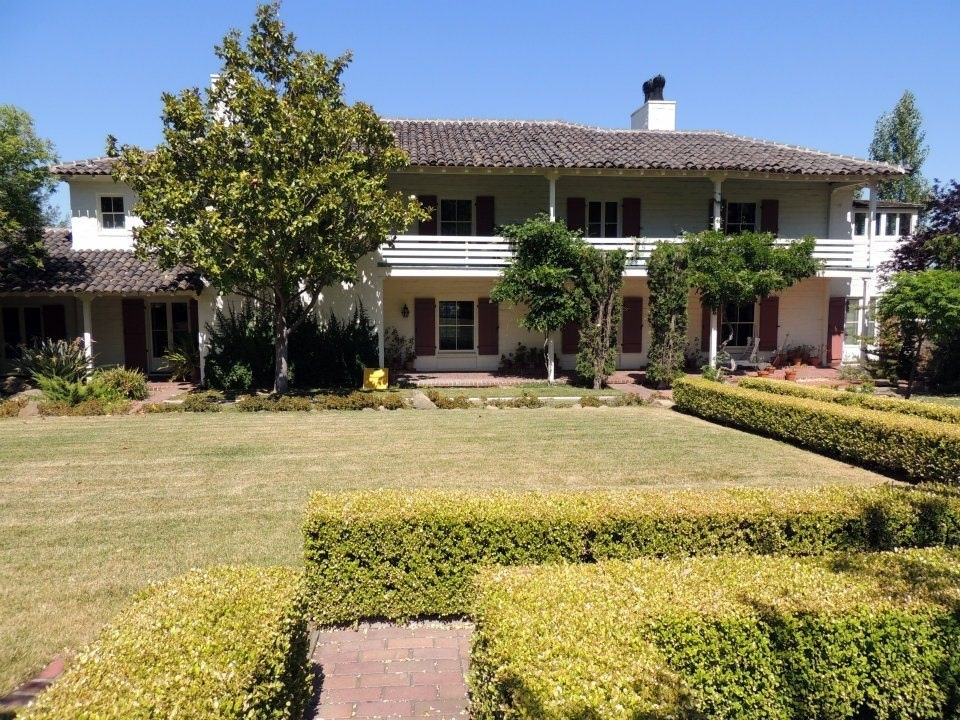
- Tao House in summer

- Location within San Francisco Bay Area Location within California Location within the United States
- Location: Kuss Road, Danville, California
- Coordinates: 37°49′28″N 122°1′47″W
- Area: 158.6 acres (64.2 ha)
- Built: 1937
- Architect: Frederick Confer
- Architectural style: Monterey Colonial
- Visitation: 14,881 (2025)
- Website: Eugene O'Neill National Historic Site
- NRHP reference No.: 71000137

Significant dates
- Added to NRHP: May 6, 1971
- Designated NHL: July 17, 1971
- Designated NHS: October 12, 1976

The Eugene O'Neill National Historic Site, located in Danville, California, preserves Tao House, the Monterey Colonial hillside home of America's only Nobel Prize-winning playwright, Eugene O'Neill.

== History of Tao House ==
Eugene O'Neill had won the Nobel Prize for Literature in 1936, and used the prize money to build what he named Tao House above Danville. O'Neill and his wife lived in the home from 1937 to 1944. By the time he moved here, O'Neill had already lived in over 35 places, but he called this secluded house his "final home and harbor". At this home, O'Neill wrote his final plays: The Iceman Cometh, Long Day's Journey Into Night, Hughie, and A Moon for the Misbegotten. Due to a degenerative condition in his hand, he was unable to complete another play after 1943.

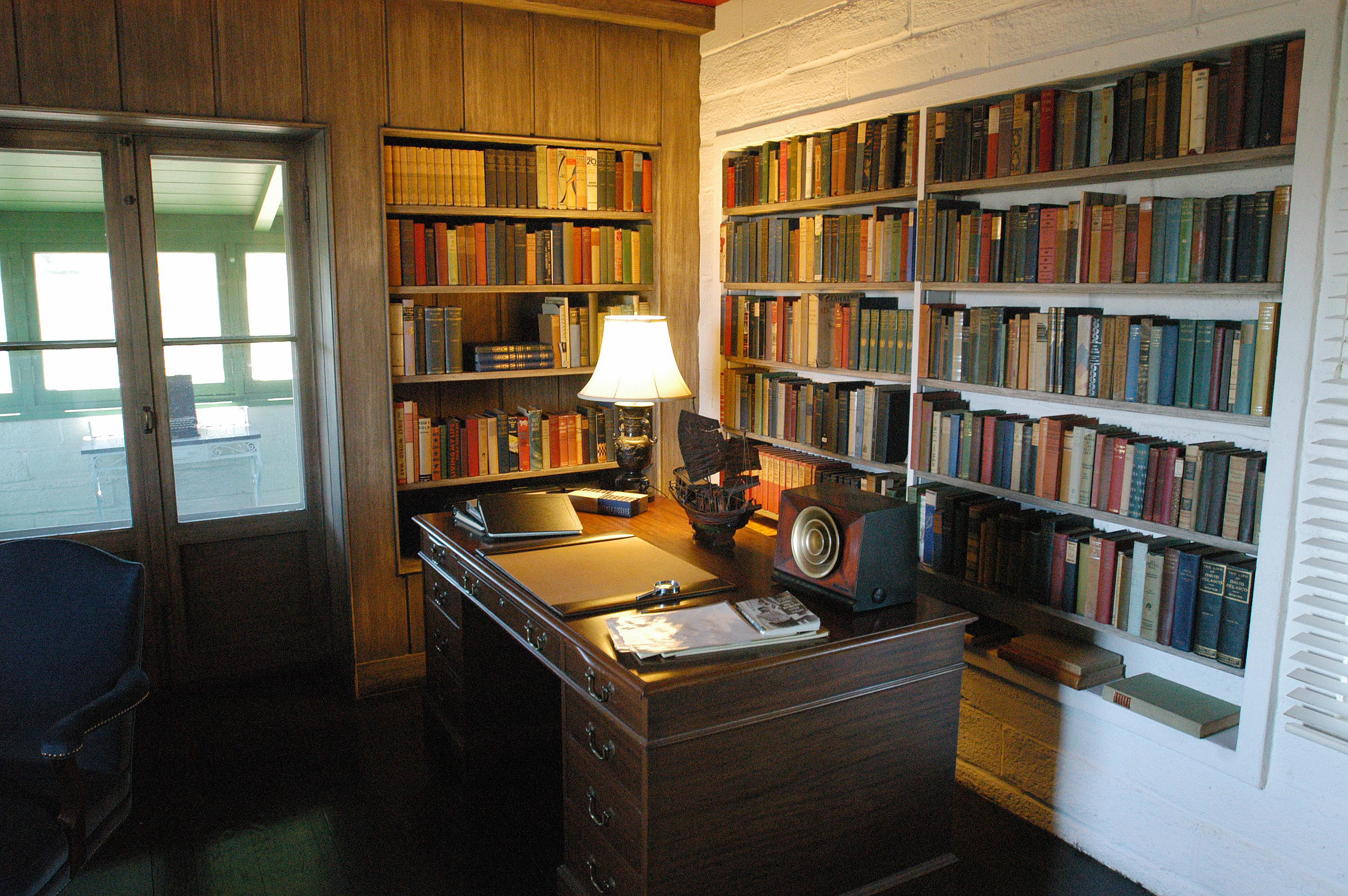
O'Neill's study in Tao House, where he wrote many of his last works

O'Neill and his wife, actress Carlotta Monterey, showed their interest in Asian art, decor, and thought in preparing the home. The two personally designed the two-story, three-bedroom home from the ground up. The ceilings were dark blue to mimic the sky with dark wood floors representing the earth, as well as Noh masks, Chinese guardian statues, and Chinese lacquerware furnishings throughout the interior. Outside, Carlotta installed a garden in a zigzag pattern which Chinese tradition indicated would keep away evil spirits. They also planted several trees, including pine, almond, and redwood. The O'Neills moved to Boston after World War II.

The house was saved from demolition in the early 1970s. Several women formed the Eugene O’Neill Foundation, including president Darlene Blair and executive vice president Lois Sizoo, in order to raise money to buy Tao House, which had been named a National Landmark in 1971. They did so through several fundraising projects, including benefit performances of Eugene O’Neill's play Hughie featuring Jason Robards. Through their efforts, Tao House was declared a National Historic Landmark in 1971, a National Historic Site in 1976, and passed into the management of the National Park Service in 1980. The Foundation has produced an annual festival of O'Neill's works since 1999, including performances on site.

== Legislative history ==
Congressman George Miller and Senator Alan Cranston introduced companion bills to have Tao House recognized as a National Historic Site in 1975. AB 4539 was signed into law in Sacramento in September 1976, making the site California State property. George Miller's HR 9126 passed in Congress and, on October 19, 1976, President Gerald Ford signed SB 2398 into law. Tao House and the property were designated a National Historic Site. Finally, on June 12 of 1980, ownership of Eugene O'Neill NHS officially transferred to the federal government, making it exactly under the NPS.

The establishment of Eugene O’Neill National Historic Site is justified by two reasons. First, the site is needed to commemorate Eugene O’Neill, one of the greatest writers in American literature. Eugene O’Neill lived in Tao House from 1937 to 1944, where he wrote his most brilliant plays. Preserving Tao House will provide public memorial of the works of Eugene O’Neill and his life. Second, the site will serve education and opportunity of performing arts to public. Providing proper cultural sources to society is one of the important missions of National Park Service.

== Administrative history ==
=== Past superintendents ===
Term	Name	Related National Parks	Note
10/18/1976 ~ 03/06/1989	Phyllis Shaw	John Muir NHS	
1989 ~ 1992	Craig W. Dorman		
1993 ~ 2004	Glenn Fuller	John Muir NHS & Port Chicago Naval Magazine NM	
September, 2005 ~ September, 2010	Martha J. Lee	John Muir NHS & Port Chicago Naval Magazine NM & Rosie the Riveter-World War II Home Front NHP	
December, 2010 ~ October, 2021	Tom Leatherman	John Muir NHS & Port Chicago Naval Magazine NM & Rosie the Riveter-World War II Home Front NHP	
October, 2021 ~ April, 2022	Naomi Torres	John Muir NHS & Port Chicago Naval Magazine NM & Rosie the Riveter-World War II Home Front NHP	Acting Superintendent
April, 2022 ~	K. Lynn Berry	John Muir NHS & Port Chicago Naval Magazine NM & Rosie the Riveter-World War II Home Front NHP	

== Current situation ==
Deferred Maintenance Figures
Year	Deferred Maintenance
2014	$88,367
2015	$1,323,688
2016	$1,298,269
2017	$1,355,781
2018	$930,705
2024	$1m

Eugene O'Neill Foundation is looking for subscribers.

Deferred maintenance information is available through the National Park Service website (pdf).

== Archive ==
The Foundation maintains an archive of Eugene O'Neill-related material at Tao House (including photographs, playbills, manuscripts, posters, and O'Neill's original phonograph record collection) and sponsors events such as productions of O'Neill plays, staged in the adjacent barn.

== Visiting the house ==
The National Park Service does not publish the address of the property, but it is widely known that it is located near Kuss Road in Danville. A locked gate prevents unauthorized vehicles from reaching the site. The Site occupies 13 acres (5.3 ha) accessible via car only by private road, so advance reservations are required to visit. Private vehicles are not allowed. Transportation to the site is provided by a twice-daily free shuttle from Danville at 10am and noon on Wednesdays to Sundays and also at 2pm on Saturdays. Reservations are required except on Saturdays when tours are self-guided.

Trails from Las Trampas Regional Wilderness also lead to the site. Reservations are also recommended for those arriving for a tour via horseback or on foot.

== See also ==
- National Register of Historic Places listings in Contra Costa County, California
- List of residences of American writers
