= Eugene O'Neill Jr. =

American classical philologist (1910–1950)

- Born: Eugene Gladstone O'Neill Jr. May 5, 1910; New York City, New York, U.S.
- Died: September 25, 1950 (aged 40); Woodstock, New York, U.S.
- Father: Eugene O'Neill
- Relatives: Oona O'Neill (half-sister); Agnes Boulton (step-mother)

Academic background
- Education: Yale University

Academic work
- Discipline: Greek Literature
- Institutions: Yale University; Sarah Lawrence College; The New School

Eugene Gladstone O'Neill Jr. (May 5, 1910 – September 25, 1950) was an American professor of Greek literature.

== Early life and education ==
O'Neill was born Eugene Gladstone O'Neill Jr. on May 5, 1910, in New York City to Eugene O'Neill, a playwright, and Kathleen Jenkins (later Pitt-Smith). In 1912, aged 2, O'Neill's parents divorced and he did not meet or know his father's name until the age of 12. O'Neill was raised in University Heights by his mother and stepfather, George Pitt-Smith (1876–1948). Reconnecting with his father in 1922, O'Neill's relationship with his father was reportedly friendly. Through his father's second marriage to the writer Agnes Boulton, O'Neill had two younger half-siblings including the actress Oona O'Neill.

He entered Yale in 1928; in his freshman year a poem he had written was widely reprinted. He graduated Phi Beta Kappa from Yale in 1932, where he was a member of Skull and Bones secret student society. After studying abroad for a year, he earned a PhD in philosophy from Yale in 1936.

== Career ==
As a classicist and philosophy scholar, O'Neill taught at Yale, Princeton, Fordham University, Sarah Lawrence College, and the New School for Social Research. He was the editor of a collection of Greek plays; shortly before his death he had contributed book reviews to The New York Times and the Saturday Review of Literature, and also been featured on the CBS radio show, Invitation to Learning.

== Personal life and death ==
O'Neill married in 1931, to Elizabeth Green; this marriage ended in divorce after six years. He married secondly Sarah Hayward in 1939, whom he divorced after seven years. He then remarried a third time, to Janet Hunter Longley. O'Neill abused alcohol, as did his father and grandfather. On September 25, 1950, in Woodstock, he committed suicide at age 40 by slitting his wrist and ankle with a razor. He then walked downstairs and expired by the front door of his cottage. These lines were found among his effects after his death: "Never let it be said of O'Neill that he failed to empty a bottle. Ave atque vale [hail and farewell]." Shortly before his death, he had played the lead in a local theatrical production for the benefit of the local artists' colony.
