= The Great God Brown =

Play written by Eugene O'Neill

- Written by: Eugene O'Neill
- Characters: Dion Anthony; William A. "Billy" Brown; Margaret; Cybel

Premiere
- Date: 1926

The Great God Brown is a play by Eugene O'Neill, first staged on January 23, 1926 at the Greenwich Theatre. O'Neill began writing notes for the play in 1922 – "Play of masks – removable – the man who really is and the mask he wears before the world" – and wrote the play between January and March 1925. Noted for its use of masks the play was included in Burns Mantle's The Best Plays of 1925-1926. The original Broadway production was directed by James Light.

== Plot ==
Dion Anthony and his friend William A. "Billy" Brown are sons of business partners. Both love Margaret, but she falls in love with Dion when he is presented behind a cruel and cynical mask, even though he is a sensitive artist. After the two men inherit the business, Dion retires to paint, but fails and eventually dies. Billy takes the mask and poses as Margaret's husband. By the time she finds out, the "real" Billy has faded away. Brown is accused of killing his "real" self, and only the unmasked prostitute Cybel is there to comfort him. Eventually Billy dies as well, and years later Margaret pledges her undying love to Dion's mask.

== In other media ==
E. E. Cummings' 1927 play, Him, features a parody of The Great God Brown. Act two, scene four of Cummings' play showcases two masked characters, Will and Bill, who exchange identities.

== Awards and nominations ==
=== 1972 Broadway revival ===
Year	Award	Category	Nominee	Result
1973	Tony Award	Best Featured Actress in a Play	Katherine Helmond	Nominated
1973	Drama Desk Award	Outstanding Performance	John Glover and John McMartin	Won
1973	Drama Desk Award	Outstanding Director	Harold Prince	Won
