= Modern Drama =

Modern Drama may refer to:

- Modern Drama (journal), a peer-reviewed academic journal publishing studies of dramatic literature
- Modern Drama (album), a 1987 album by Jane Ira Bloom
- Twentieth-century theatre, also known as modern drama
- Huaju, also known as modern Chinese drama
