= Eugene O'Neill =

American playwright (1888–1953)

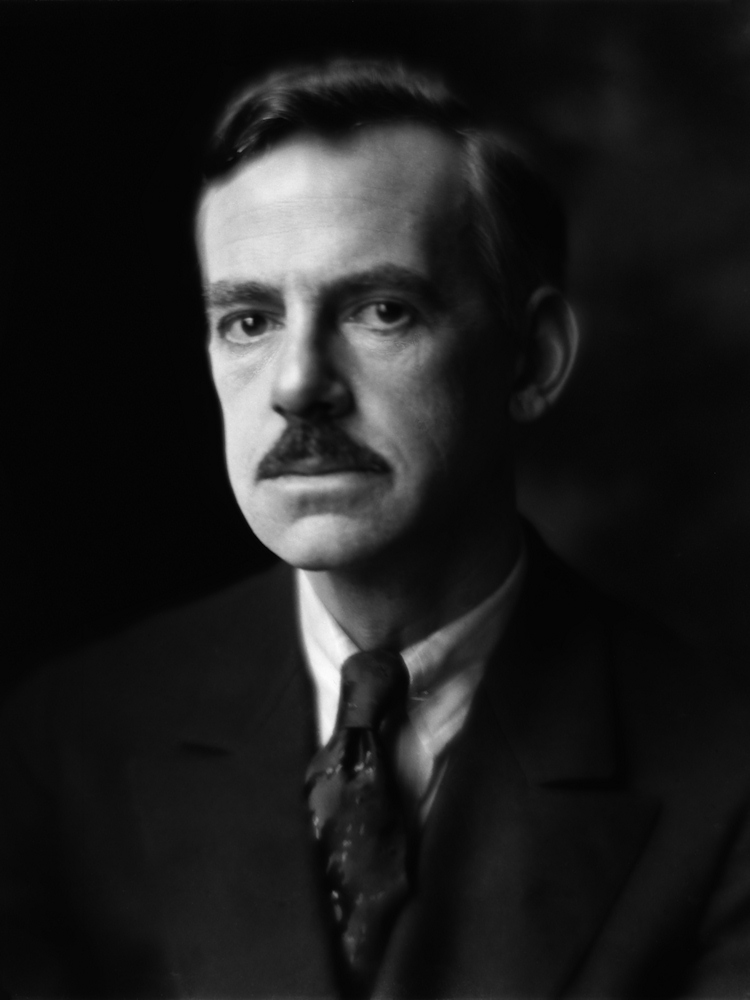
- Born: Eugene Gladstone O'Neill; October 16, 1888; New York City, U.S.
- Died: November 27, 1953 (aged 65); Boston, Massachusetts, U.S.
- Education: Princeton University
- Occupation: Playwright
- Spouses: Kathleen Jenkins (m. 1909; div. 1912) Agnes Boulton (m. 1918; div. 1929) Carlotta Monterey (m. 1929)
- Children: Eugene Jr.; Shane; Oona
- Parent(s): James O'Neill; Mary Ellen Quinlan
- Relatives: Charlie Chaplin (son in-law); Geraldine Chaplin (granddaughter); Oona Chaplin (great-granddaughter)
- Writing career
- Notable works: Long Day's Journey into Night; The Hairy Ape; Mourning Becomes Electra; Ah, Wilderness!; The Iceman Cometh
- Notable awards: Nobel Prize in Literature (1936); Pulitzer Prize for Drama (1920, 1922, 1928, 1957); Tony Award for Best Play (1957)

Eugene Gladstone O'Neill Sr. (October 16, 1888 – November 27, 1953) was an American playwright. His poetically titled plays were among the first to introduce into the U.S. the drama techniques of realism, earlier associated with Chekhov, Ibsen, and Strindberg. The tragedy Long Day's Journey into Night is often included on lists of the finest American plays in the 20th century, alongside Tennessee Williams's A Streetcar Named Desire and Arthur Miller's Death of a Salesman. He was awarded the 1936 Nobel Prize in Literature and the 1957 Tony Award for Best Play. O'Neill is also the only playwright to win four Pulitzer Prizes for Drama.

O'Neill's plays were among the first to include speeches in American English vernacular and involve characters on the fringes of society. They struggle to maintain their hopes and aspirations, ultimately sliding into disillusion and despair. Of his very few comedies, only one is well known (Ah, Wilderness!). Nearly all of his other plays involve some degree of tragedy and personal pessimism.

== Early life ==
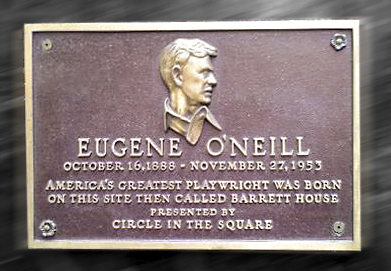
Birthplace plaque (1500 Broadway, northeast corner of 43rd and Broadway, New York City), presented by Circle in the Square

O'Neill was born on October 16, 1888, in a hotel, the Barrett House, on what was then Longacre Square (now Times Square) in New York City. A commemorative plaque was first dedicated there in 1957. The site is now occupied by 1500 Broadway, which houses offices, shops, and the ABC Studios.

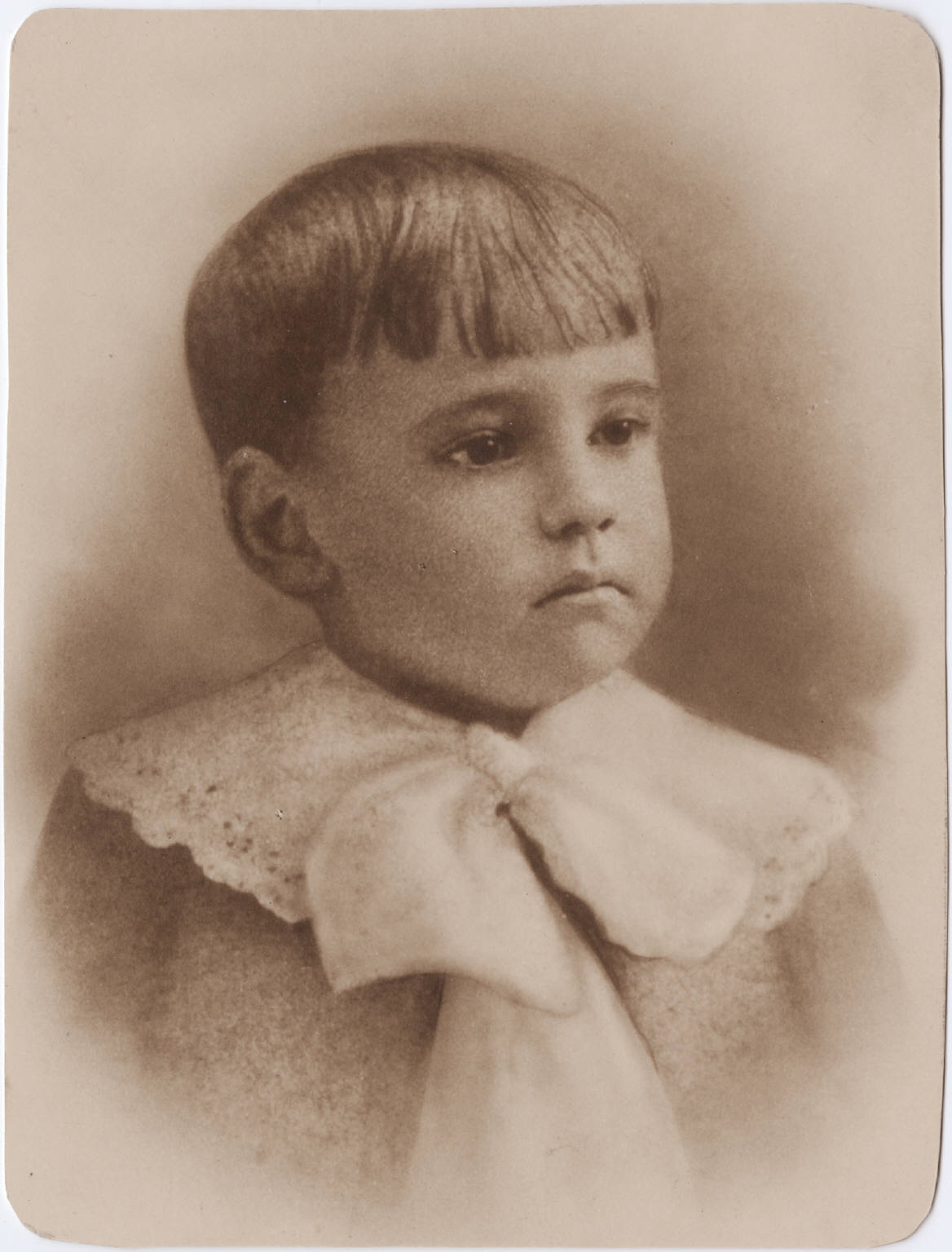
Portrait of O'Neill as a child, c. 1893

He was the son of Irish immigrant actor James O'Neill and Mary Ellen Quinlan, who was also of Irish descent. His father suffered from alcoholism; his mother from an addiction to morphine, prescribed to relieve the pains of the difficult birth of her third son Eugene. Because his father was often on tour with a theatrical company accompanied by his mother, in 1895 O'Neill was sent to St. Aloysius Academy for Boys, a Catholic boarding school in the Riverdale section of the Bronx. In 1900 he became a day student at the De La Salle Institute on 59th Street in Manhattan.

The O'Neill family reunited for summers at the Monte Cristo Cottage in New London, Connecticut. He also briefly attended Betts Academy in Stamford. He attended Princeton University for one year. Accounts vary as to why he left. He may have been dropped for attending too few classes, been suspended for "conduct code violations", or "for breaking a window", or according to a more concrete but possibly apocryphal account, because he threw "a beer bottle into the window of Professor Woodrow Wilson", the future president of the United States.

Statue of O'Neill as a boy, sitting and writing, overlooking the harbor of New London, Connecticut

O'Neill spent several years at sea, during which he suffered from depression, alcoholism, and despair. Despite this, he had a deep love for the sea and it became a prominent theme in many of his plays, several of which are set on board ships like those on which he worked. O'Neill joined the Marine Transport Workers Union of the Industrial Workers of the World (IWW), which was fighting for improved living conditions for the working class using quick 'on the job' direct action. O'Neill's parents and elder brother Jamie (who drank himself to death at the age of 45) died within three years of one another, not long after he had begun to make his mark in the theater.

== Career ==
After returning to New York and living in poverty, O'Neill attempted suicide in 1912 in his room at Jimmy-the-Priest's boarding house and saloon, which — together with the Hell Hole — would one day become the setting for his play The Iceman Cometh. That same year, he and his first wife Kathleen divorced, and he contracted tuberculosis. It was during his recovery at a sanatorium — which he came to regard as his "rebirth" — that he determined he would become a playwright. "I want to be an artist or nothing," he said.

After recovering from tuberculosis, he decided to devote himself full time to writing plays (the events immediately prior to entering the sanatorium are dramatized in his masterpiece, Long Day's Journey into Night). O'Neill had previously been employed by the New London Telegraph, writing poetry as well as reporting. In the fall of 1914, O'Neill studied at Harvard University with George Pierce Baker, who ran a famous course called “Workshop 47” that taught the fundamentals of playwriting, but left after one year.

During the 1910s, O'Neill was a regular on the Greenwich Village literary scene, where he also befriended many radicals, most notably Communist Labor Party of America founder John Reed. O'Neill also had a brief romantic relationship with Reed's wife, writer Louise Bryant. O'Neill was portrayed by Jack Nicholson in the 1981 film Reds, about the life of John Reed; Louise Bryant was portrayed by Diane Keaton. His involvement with the Provincetown Players began in mid-1916. Terry Carlin reported that O'Neill arrived for the summer in Provincetown with "a trunk full of plays", but this was an exaggeration. Susan Glaspell describes a reading of Bound East for Cardiff that took place in the living room of Glaspell and her husband George Cram Cook's home on Commercial Street, adjacent to the wharf (pictured) that was used by the Players for their theater: "So Gene took Bound East for Cardiff out of his trunk, and Freddie Burt read it to us, Gene staying out in the dining-room while reading went on. He was not left alone in the dining-room when the reading had finished." The Provincetown Players performed many of O'Neill's early works in their theaters both in Provincetown and on MacDougal Street in Greenwich Village. Some of these early plays, such as The Emperor Jones, began downtown and then moved to Broadway.

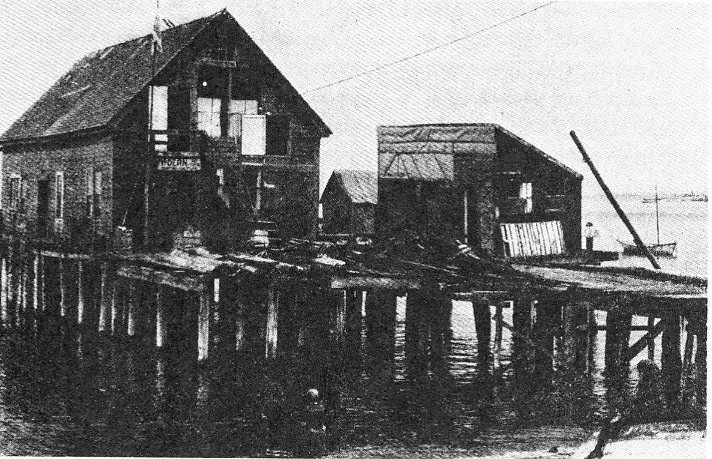
O'Neill's first play, Bound East for Cardiff, premiered at this theatre on a wharf in Provincetown, Massachusetts.

In an early one-act play, The Web, written in 1913, O'Neill first explored the darker themes that he later thrived on. Here he focused on the brothel world and the lives of prostitutes, which also play a role in some fourteen of his later plays. In particular, he memorably included the birth of an infant into the world of prostitution. At the time, such themes constituted a huge innovation, as these sides of life had never before been presented with such success.

O'Neill's first published play, Beyond the Horizon, opened on Broadway in 1920 to great acclaim and was awarded the Pulitzer Prize for Drama. His first major hit was The Emperor Jones, which ran on Broadway in 1920 and obliquely commented on the U.S. occupation of Haiti that was a topic of debate in that year's presidential election. His best known plays include Anna Christie (Pulitzer Prize 1922), Desire Under the Elms (1924), Strange Interlude (Pulitzer Prize 1928), Mourning Becomes Electra (1931), and his only well known comedy, Ah, Wilderness!, a wistful re-imagining of his youth as he wished it had been.

O'Neill was elected to the American Philosophical Society in 1935. In 1936 O'Neill received the Nobel Prize in Literature after he had been nominated that year by Henrik Schück, member of the Swedish Academy. O'Neill was profoundly influenced by the work of Swedish writer August Strindberg, and, upon receiving the Nobel Prize, dedicated much of his acceptance speech to him. In conversation with Russel Crouse, O'Neill said that "the Strindberg part of the speech is no 'telling tale' to please the Swedes with a polite gesture. It is absolutely sincere. [...] And it's absolutely true that I am proud of the opportunity to acknowledge my debt to Strindberg thus publicly to his people". Before the speech was sent to Stockholm, O'Neill read it to his friend Sophus Keith Winther. As he was reading, he suddenly interrupted himself with the comment: "I wish immortality were a fact, for then some day I would meet Strindberg". When Winther objected that "that would scarcely be enough to justify immortality", O'Neill answered quickly and firmly: "It would be enough for me".

After a ten-year pause, O'Neill's now renowned play The Iceman Cometh was produced in 1946. The following year's A Moon for the Misbegotten failed, and it was decades before the piece came to be considered as among his best works.

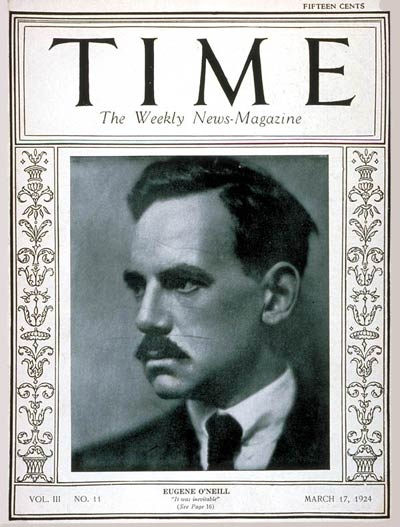
Time cover, March 17, 1924

He was also part of the modern movement to partially revive the classical heroic mask from ancient Greek theatre and Japanese Noh theatre in some of his plays, such as The Great God Brown and Lazarus Laughed.

== Family life ==
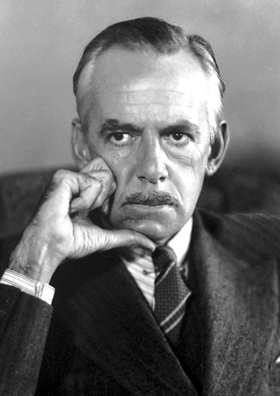
O'Neill in the mid-1930s. He received the Nobel Prize in Literature in 1936

O'Neill was married to Kathleen Jenkins from October 2, 1909, to 1912, during which time they had one son, Eugene O'Neill, Jr. (1910–1950). In 1917 O'Neill met Agnes Boulton, a successful writer of commercial fiction, and they married on April 12, 1918. They lived in a home owned by her parents in Point Pleasant, New Jersey. The years of their marriage—during which the couple lived in Connecticut and Bermuda and had two children, Shane and Oona—are described vividly in her 1958 memoir Part of a Long Story. They divorced on July 2, 1929, after O'Neill abandoned Boulton and the children for the actress Carlotta Monterey. O'Neill and Monterey married less than a month after he officially divorced his previous wife.

In 1929 O'Neill and Monterey moved to the Loire Valley in central France, where they lived in the Château du Plessis in Saint-Antoine-du-Rocher, Indre-et-Loire. During the early 1930s they returned to the United States and lived in Sea Island, Georgia, at a house called Casa Genotta. He moved to Danville, California, in 1937 and lived there until 1944. His house there, Tao House, is today the Eugene O'Neill National Historic Site.

In their first years together, Monterey organized O'Neill's life, enabling him to devote himself to writing. She later became addicted to potassium bromide, and the marriage deteriorated, resulting in a number of separations, although they never divorced.

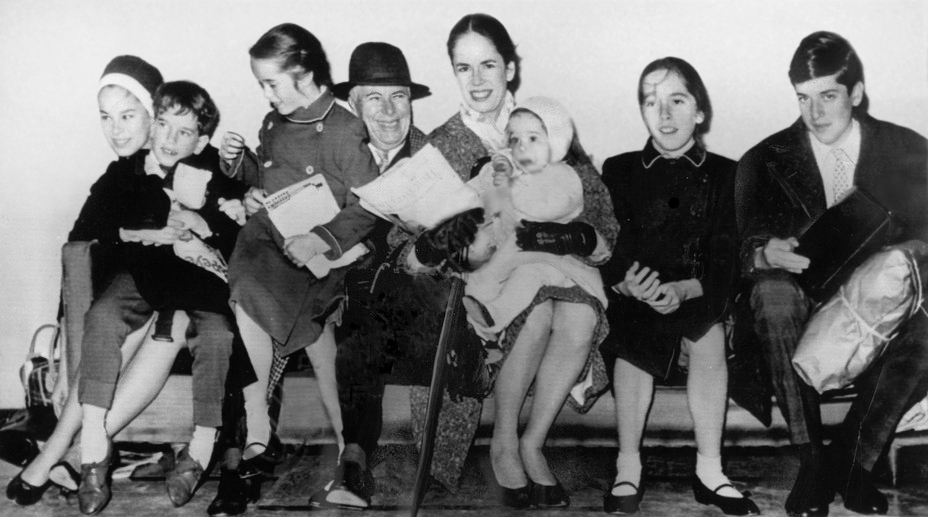
The Chaplins and six of their eight children (Jane and Christopher are absent) in 1961. From left to right: Geraldine, Eugene, Victoria, Chaplin, Oona O'Neill, Annette, Josephine, and Michael.

In 1943 O'Neill disowned his daughter Oona for marrying the English actor, director, and producer Charlie Chaplin when she was 18 and Chaplin was 54. He never saw Oona again. Through his daughter, O'Neill had eight grandchildren whom he never met.

He also had distant relationships with his sons. Eugene O'Neill Jr., a Yale classicist, suffered from alcoholism and died by suicide in 1950 at the age of 40. Shane O'Neill became a heroin addict and moved into the family home in Bermuda, Spithead, with his new wife, where he supported himself by selling off the furnishings. He was also disowned by his father before committing suicide (by jumping out of a window) a number of years later. Oona ultimately inherited Spithead and the connected estate (subsequently known as the Chaplin Estate). In 1950 O'Neill joined The Lambs, the famed theater club.

| Child | Date of birth | Date of death |
|---|---|---|
| Eugene O'Neill Jr. | May 5, 1910 | September 25, 1950 |
| Shane O'Neill | October 30, 1919 | June 23, 1977 |
| Oona O'Neill | May 14, 1925 | September 27, 1991 |

== Illness and death ==
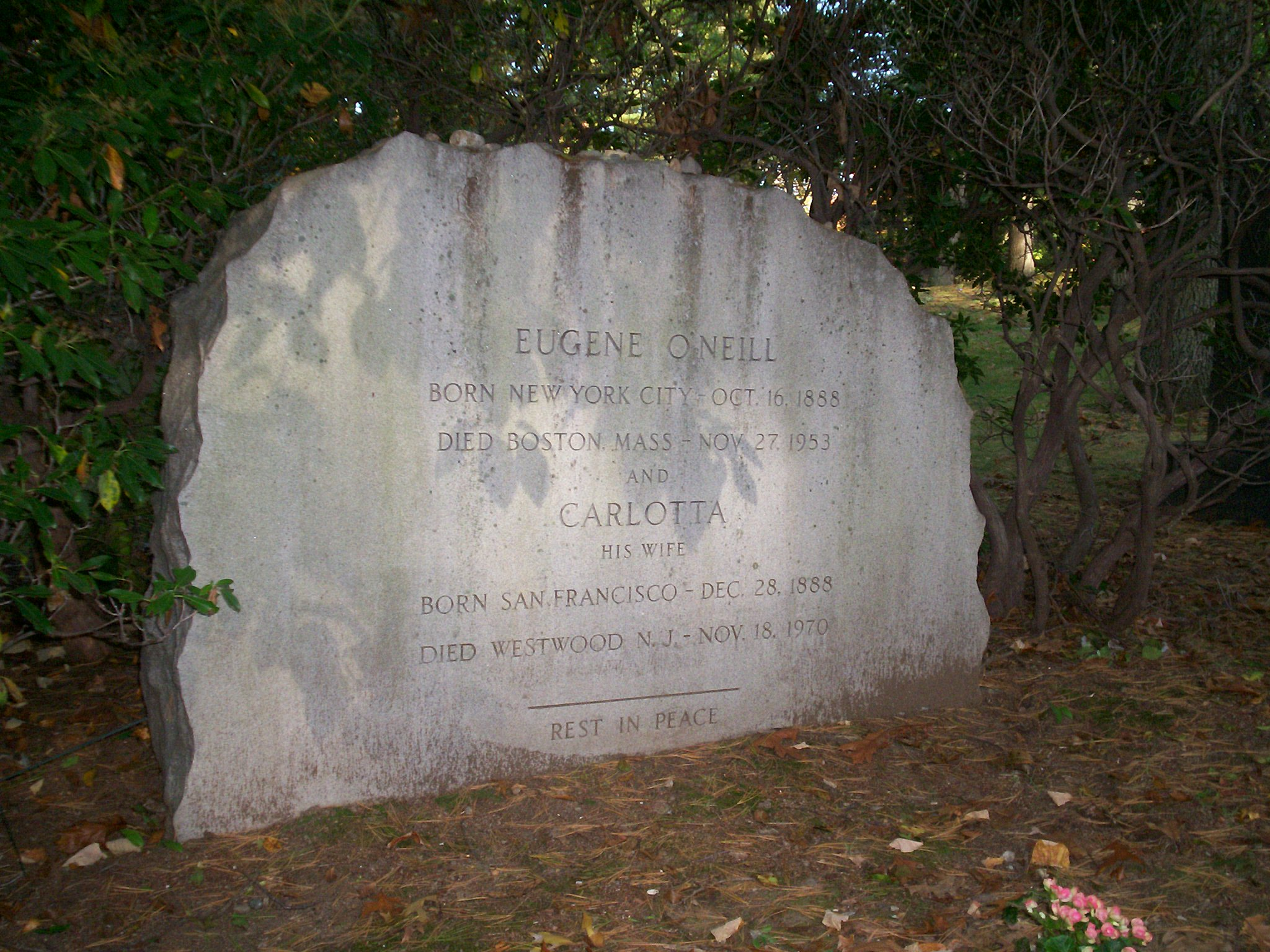
Grave of Eugene O'Neill

After suffering from multiple health problems (including depression and alcoholism) over many years, O'Neill ultimately faced a severe Parkinson's-like tremor in his hands that made it impossible for him to write during the last ten years of his life; he tried dictation but found himself unable to compose that way. While at Tao House, O'Neill had intended to write a collection of works he called "the Cycle", chronicling American life spanning from 1755 to 1932. Only two of the eleven plays O'Neill proposed, A Touch of the Poet and More Stately Mansions, were completed. As his health worsened, O'Neill lost inspiration for the project and wrote three largely autobiographical plays, The Iceman Cometh, Long Day's Journey into Night, and A Moon for the Misbegotten, which he completed in 1943, just before leaving Tao House and losing his ability to write. The book "Love and Admiration and Respect": The O'Neill-Commins Correspondence" includes an extended account written by Saxe Commins, O'Neill's publisher, in which he talks of "snatches of dialogue" between Carlotta and O'Neill over the disappearance of a group of manuscripts that O'Neill had brought with him from San Francisco. "When the table was cleared I learned the cause of the tension; the manuscripts were lost. They had disappeared mysteriously during the day and there was no clue to their whereabouts."

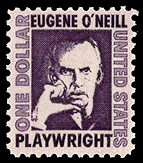
O'Neill stamp issued in 1967

O'Neill died at the Sheraton Hotel (now Boston University's Kilachand Hall) on Bay State Road in Boston on November 27, 1953, at age 65. As he was dying, he whispered: "I knew it. I knew it. Born in a hotel room and died in a hotel room." He is interred in the Forest Hills Cemetery in Boston's Jamaica Plain neighborhood.

In 1956 Carlotta arranged for his autobiographical play Long Day's Journey into Night to be published, although his written instructions had stipulated that it not be made public until 25 years after his death. It was produced on stage to tremendous critical acclaim and won the Pulitzer Prize in 1957. It is widely considered his finest play. Other posthumously published works include A Touch of the Poet (1958) and More Stately Mansions (1967).

In 1967 the United States Postal Service honored O'Neill with a Prominent Americans series (1965–1978) $1 postage stamp.

In 2000 a team of researchers studying O'Neill's autopsy report concluded that he died of cerebellar cortical atrophy, a rare form of brain deterioration unrelated to either alcohol use or Parkinson's disease.

== Legacy ==
In Warren Beatty's 1981 film Reds, O'Neill is portrayed by Jack Nicholson, who was nominated for the Academy Award for Best Supporting Actor for his performance.

George C. White founded the Eugene O'Neill Theatre Center in Waterford, Connecticut in 1964.

Eugene O'Neill is a member of the American Theater Hall of Fame.

O'Neill is referenced by Upton Sinclair in The Cup of Fury (1956), by Dianne Wiest's character in Bullets Over Broadway (1994), by J.K. Simmons' character in Whiplash (2014), by Tony Stark in Avengers: Age of Ultron (2015), specifically Long Day's Journey into Night, and Long Day's Journey into Night is also referenced by Patrick Wilson's character in Purple Violets (2007).

O'Neill is referred to in Moss Hart's 1959 book Act One, later a Broadway play.

== Museums and collections ==
O'Neill's home in New London, Monte Cristo Cottage, was made a National Historic Landmark in 1971. His home in Danville, California, near San Francisco, was preserved as the Eugene O'Neill National Historic Site in 1976.

Connecticut College maintains the Louis Sheaffer Collection, consisting of material collected by the O'Neill biographer. The principal collection of O'Neill papers is at Yale University. The Eugene O'Neill Theater Center in Waterford, Connecticut, fosters the development of new plays under his name.

There is also a theatre in New York City named after him located at 230 West 49th Street in midtown-Manhattan. The Eugene O'Neill Theatre has housed musicals and plays such as Yentl, Annie, Grease, M. Butterfly, Spring Awakening, and The Book of Mormon.

== Work ==
=== Full-length plays ===
- Bread and Butter, 1914
- Servitude, 1914
- The Personal Equation, 1915
- Now I Ask You, 1916
- Beyond the Horizon, 1918 - Pulitzer Prize, 1920
- The Straw, 1919
- Chris Christophersen, 1919
- Gold, 1920
- Anna Christie, 1920 - Pulitzer Prize, 1922
- The Emperor Jones, 1920
- Diff'rent, 1921
- The First Man, 1922
- The Hairy Ape, 1922
- The Fountain, 1923
- Marco Millions, 1923–25
- All God's Chillun Got Wings, 1924
- Welded, 1924
- Desire Under the Elms, 1924
- Lazarus Laughed, 1925–26
- The Great God Brown, 1926
- Strange Interlude, 1928 - Pulitzer Prize
- Dynamo, 1929
- Mourning Becomes Electra, 1931
- Ah, Wilderness!, 1933
- Days Without End, 1933
- More Stately Mansions, written 1937–1938, first performed 1967
- The Iceman Cometh, written 1939, published 1940, first performed 1946
- Long Day's Journey into Night, written 1941, first performed 1956; Pulitzer Prize 1957
- A Moon for the Misbegotten, written 1941–1943, first performed 1947
- A Touch of the Poet, completed in 1942, first performed 1958

=== One-act plays ===
The Glencairn Plays, all of which feature characters on the fictional ship Glencairn—filmed together as The Long Voyage Home:

- Bound East for Cardiff, 1916
- In the Zone, 1917
- The Long Voyage Home, 1917
- Moon of the Caribbees, 1918

Other one-act plays include:

- A Wife for a Life, 1913
- The Web, 1913
- Thirst, 1913
- Recklessness, 1913
- Warnings, 1913
- Fog, 1914
- Abortion, 1914
- The Movie Man: A Comedy, 1914
- The Sniper, 1915
- Before Breakfast, 1916
- Ile, 1917
- The Rope, 1918
- Shell Shock, 1918
- The Dreamy Kid, 1918
- Where the Cross Is Made, 1918
- Exorcism, 1919
- Hughie, written 1941, first performed 1959

=== Other works ===
- Tomorrow, 1917. A short-story published in The Seven Arts, Vol. II, No. 8 in June 1917.
- S.O.S., 1918. A short-story based on his 1913 one-act play Warnings.
- The Ancient Mariner, 1923, a dramatic arrangement of Coleridge's poem.
- The Last Will and Testament of an Extremely Distinguished Dog, 1940. Written to comfort Carlotta as their "child" Blemie was approaching his death in December 1940.
- Poems: 1912-1944, published 1980.
- Eugene O'Neill at Work: Newly Released Ideas for Plays, published 1981. Annotated notebooks written between 1918 and 1943 containing notes on plays published, unpublished, and unfinished.
- The Calms of Capricorn, unfinished play, published in 1983.
- The Unknown O'Neill: Unpublished Or Unfamiliar Writings of Eugene O'Neill, published in 1988.
- The Unfinished Plays: Notes for The Visit of Malatesta, The Last Conquest and Blind Alley Guy, published in 1988.

== See also ==
- List of agnostics
- List of American Nobel laureates
- The Eugene O'Neill Award

Awards and achievements
| Preceded by Warren S. Stone | Cover of Time magazine March 17, 1924 | Succeeded by Raymond Poincaré |
