= Carlotta Monterey =

American actress (1888–1970)

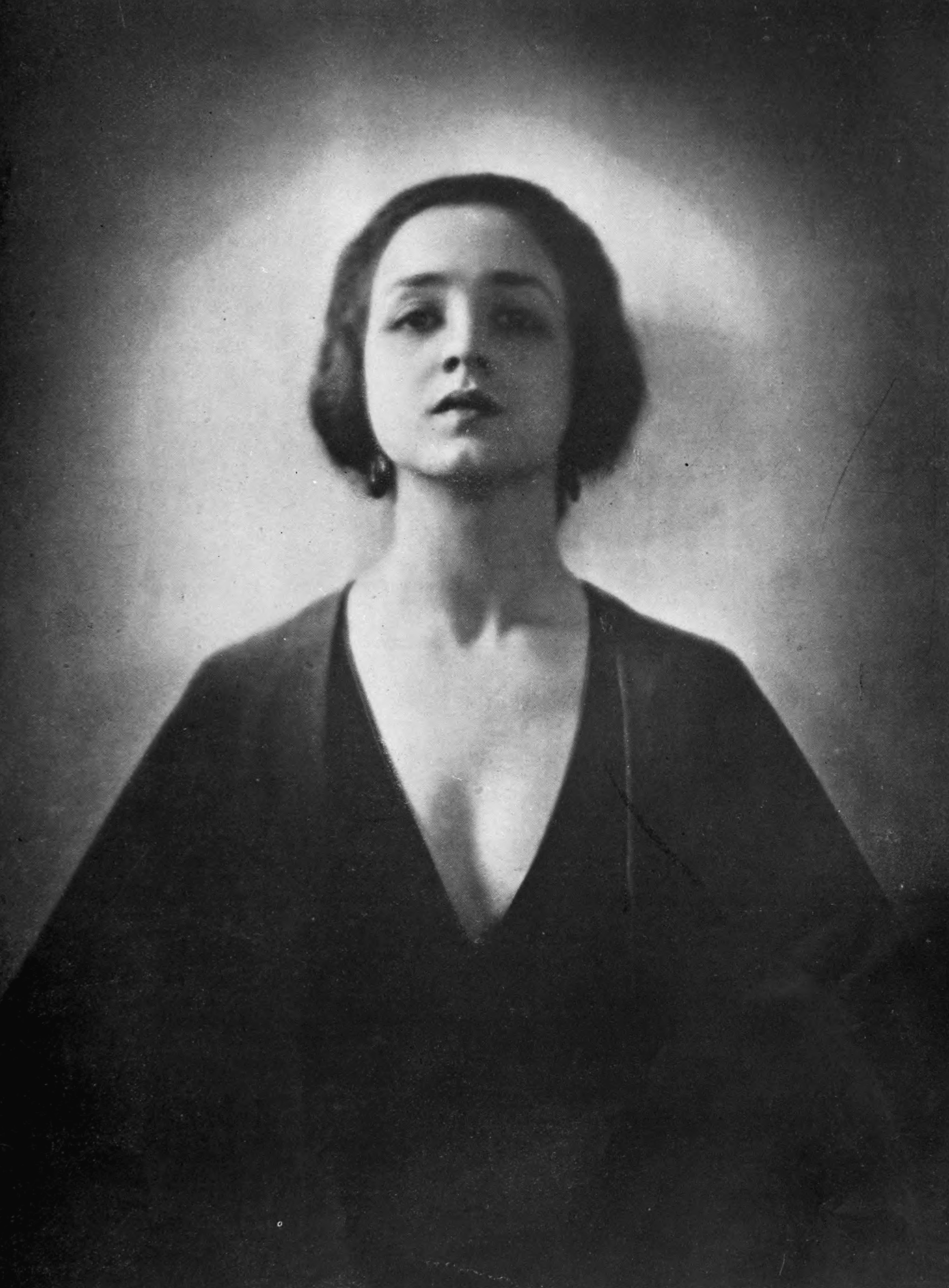
- Born: Hazel Nielsen Tharsing; December 28, 1888; San Francisco, California, U.S.
- Died: November 18, 1970 (aged 81); Westwood, New Jersey, U.S.
- Occupations: Stage and film actress
- Spouses: John Moffat (m. 1911, divorced) Malvin C. Chapman Jr. (m. 1916; div. 1923) Ralph Barton (m. 1923; div. 1926) Eugene O'Neill (m. 1929; died 1953)
- Children: 1

Carlotta Monterey (born Hazel Nielsen Tharsing; December 28, 1888 – November 18, 1970) was an American stage and film actress. She was the third and final wife of playwright Eugene O'Neill.

== Early life ==
Carlotta Monterey was born Hazel Nielsen Tharsing on December 28, 1888, in San Francisco, California to Christian Nielsen Tharsing (1848-1932), a Danish immigrant who was a fruit farmer, and Nellie Gotchett (1866-1946). Abandoned by her father, she was raised by an aunt from the age of four.

== Career ==
After she won the title of "Miss California" in a beauty contest, she traveled to London to study acting with Sir Herbert Beerbohm Tree. She adopted the name Carlotta Monterey after her return to the United States at the start of World War I and pursued a career in the theatre. She garnered disparaging reviews of her acting ability, but her beauty was much admired.

== Personal life ==
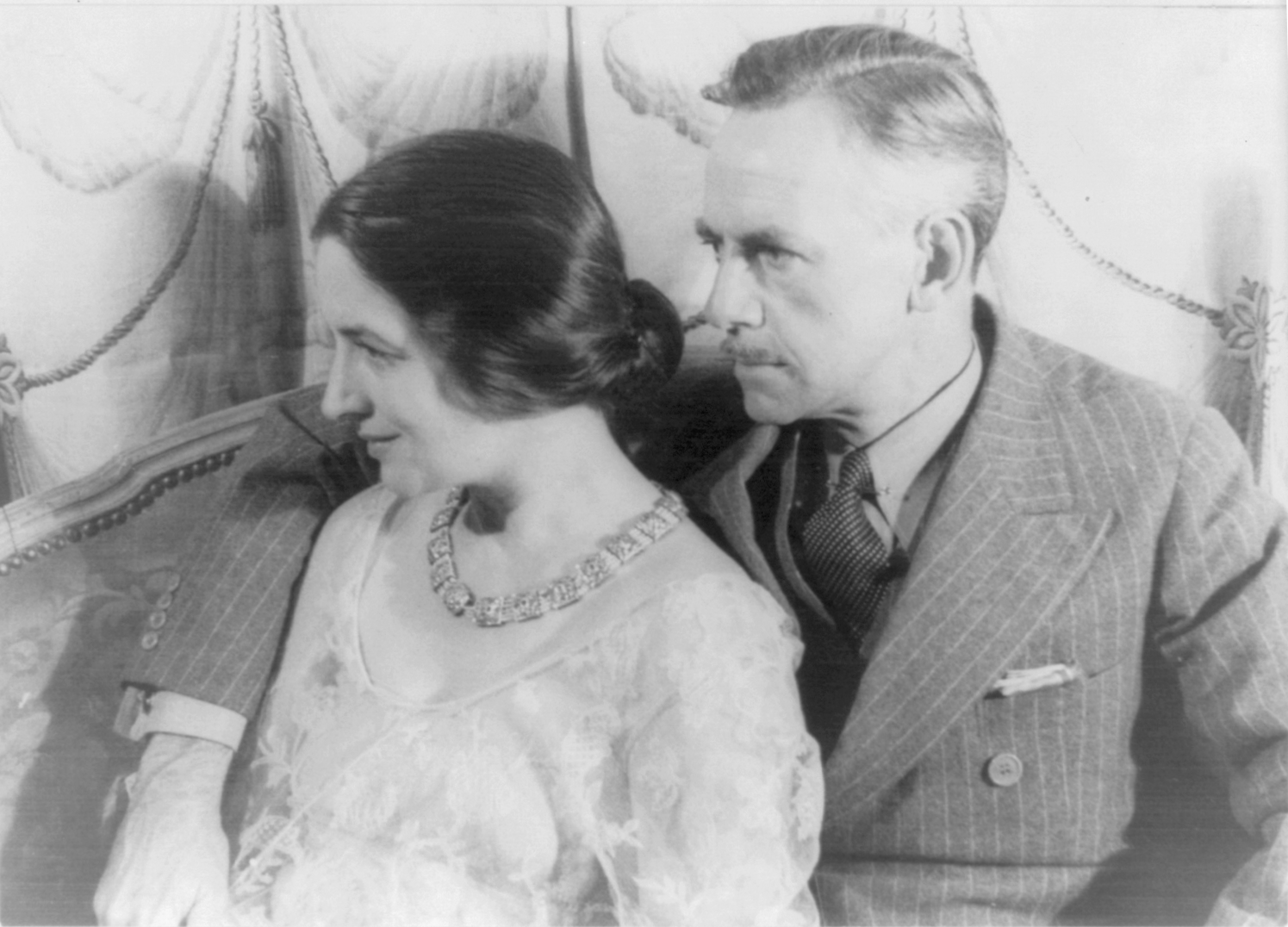
Monterey with Eugene O'Neill, 1933

She married her first husband, John Moffat, a lawyer, in 1911. They were divorced. She married secondly Malvin C. Chapman Jr. in 1916. They had one daughter, Cynthia Jane Chapman (born 1917). She got divorced again. After divorcing her third husband, the illustrator Ralph Barton, in 1926, she became romantically involved with Eugene O'Neill, whom she had met in 1922 when she acted in a production of his play The Hairy Ape. They married in July 1929 in Paris.

She remained with O'Neill for the rest of his life, and dedicated herself to maintaining his privacy. After his death in 1953, Carlotta authorized the publication of his autobiographical play Long Day's Journey Into Night, which O'Neill had instructed his publisher to withhold until 25 years after his death. The play was awarded the 1957 Pulitzer Prize for Drama, and is O'Neill's best known work.

== Death ==
A resident of the Valley Nursing Home in Westwood, New Jersey, Monterey died there on November 18, 1970.

== Partial filmography ==
- The Cost (1920)
- Soul-Fire (1925)
