= List of musicals by composer: A to L =

This is a general list of composers who have written music for the musical theatre, along with their works organized by first production date. This list primarily contains musicals, but also includes links to film adaptations. Lyricists and their work are listed separately.

For composers whose names fall into the M-Z alphabetic range, see List of musicals by composer: M to Z.

== A ==
- Joseph Abella

Siddhartha (2007); music also by Jude Gitamondoc, Alfeuso Esposite

- Danny Abosch

Unwritten Rules (2007)
Placebo (2010)
Fancy Nancy The Musical (2012)
Off The Wall (2013)
Miles & Me (2013)
Goosebumps The Musical (2016)

- Fabrice Aboulker (b. 1959)

Les mille et une vies d'Ali Baba (2000); music also by Alain Lanty

- Tim Acito

Zanna, Don't! (2002)
The Women of Brewster Place (2007)

- Cliff Adams (1923–2001)

Liza of Lambeth (1976)

- Dianne Adams

The Wind in the Willows (1997)

- Richard Addinsell (1904–1977)

Alice in Wonderland (1947)
Joyce Grenfell Requests the Pleasure... (1955)
Living for Pleasure (1958)

- John Addison (1920–1998)

Cranks (1955)
The Amazons (2002)

- Gary Adler (b. 1965)

Altar Boyz (2005); music also by Michael Patrick Walker

- Richard Adler (1921–2012)

John Murray Anderson's Almanac (1953); music also by Jerry Ross and others
The Pajama Game (1954); music also by Jerry Ross; also a 1975 film
Damn Yankees (1955); music also by Jerry Ross; also a 1958 film
Kwamina (1961)
A Mother's Kisses (1968)
Music Is (1976)

- Milton Ager (1893–1979)

What's in a Name? (1920)
Rain or Shine (1929); music also by Owen Murphy
Murray Anderson's Almanac (1929); music also by Henry Sullivan

- Fred E. Ahlert (1892–1953)

Paris (1928); music also by Cole Porter, Walter Kollo, Harry Warren, Louis Alter

- Harry Akst (1894–1963)

Artists and Models of 1927 (1927); music also by Maurice Rubens
Calling All Stars (1934)

- Michelangelo Alasá

Born to Rumba (1991)
Chez Garbo (1996)

- Damon Albarn (b. 1968)

Wonder.land (2015)

- Brad Alexander (b. 1971)

Just So Stories (2003)
If You Give A Pig A Pancake & Other Story Books (2008)
Click, Clack, Moo (2009)
See Rock City & Other Destinations (2010)
We The People: America Rocks! (2010)
Duck For President & Other Story Books (2010)

- Gene Allan

Billy (1969); music also by Ron Dante

- Herbert Allen

Space Is So Startling (1962); music also by Richard Hadden, Cecil Broadhurst

- Peter Allen (1944–1992)

Up in One (1979); music also by others
Legs Diamond (1988)
The Boy from Oz (1998); music also by others

- Steve Allen (1921–2000)

Sophie (1963)

- Peter Allwood

Pendragon (1994)

- Todd Almond

People Like Us (2005)

- Steven M. Alper (b. 1958)

The Gifts of the Magi (1988); music also by Randy Courts
The Library (1996)
The Immigrant (2000)

- Gaby Alter

Nobody Loves You (2012)

- Louis Alter (1902–1980)

Paris (1928); music also by Cole Porter, Walter Kollo, Harry Warren, Fred E. Ahlert

- John Altman (b. 1949)

Kisses on a Postcard (2004); music also by Gordon Clyde

- Alfred Alvarez

Bed, Boys and Beyond (2000)

- César Alvarez

The Elementary Spacetime Show
The Universe is a Small Hat
FUTURITY

- Dan Alvy

Identical Twins from Baltimore (1995)

- Trey Anastasio (b. 1964)

Hands on a Hard Body (2012); music also by Amanda Green

- Mark Andersen

Widow's Waltz (1992)

- Leroy Anderson (1908–1975)

Goldilocks (1958)
Stardust (1987); music also by Hoagy Carmichael, Duke Ellington, Benny Goodman

- Roger Anderson

Chaplin (1993)
Shine! – The Horatio Alger Musical (2001)
Abe (2009)

- Benny Andersson (b. 1946)

Abbacadabra (1983); music also by Björn Ulvaeus
Chess (1984); music also by Björn Ulvaeus
Kristina från Duvemåla (1995); music also by Björn Ulvaeus
Mamma Mia! (1999); music also by Björn Ulvaeus; also a 2008 film

- Judy Hart Angelo

Preppies (1983); music also by Gary Portnoy

- Barbara Anselmi

It Shoulda Been You (2015)

- Greg Antonacci (1947–2017)

Dance with Me (1975)

- Danny Apolinar (1934–1995)

Your Own Thing (1968); music also by Hal Hester

- Harry Archer (1886–1960)

Little Jessie James (1923)
Paradise Alley (1924); music also by Carle Carlton and A. Otvos
My Girl (1924)
Merry, Merry (1925)
Twinkle, Twinkle (1926)
Just a Minute (1928)

- Leslie Arden (b. 1957)

The Boys Are Coming Home (2006)
The House of Martin Guerre (1997)

- Harold Arlen (1905–1986)

9:15 Revue (1930); music also by others
Earl Carroll's Vanities of 1930 (1930); music also by Jay Gorney
You Said It (1931)
Earl Carroll's Vanities of 1932 (1932)
Americana (1932); music also by Jay Gorney, Herman Hupfeld, Richard Meyers
Life Begins at 8:40 (1934)
Hooray for What! (1937)
Star and Garter (1942); music also by others
Bloomer Girl (1944)
St. Louis Woman (1946)
House of Flowers (1954)
Jamaica (1957)
Saratoga (1959)
The Harold Arlen Songbook (1967)
The Wizard of Oz (1987)
The Wizard of Oz (2011); music also by Andrew Lloyd Webber

- David Arnold (b. 1962)

Made in Dagenham (2014)

- Mel Atkey (1958–2022)

O Pioneers! (2001)
A Little Princess (2003)

- Nat D. Ayer (1987–1952)

The Bing Boys Are Here (1916)
Yes, Uncle! (1917)

- Charles Aznavour (1924–2018)

Lautrec (2000)

== B ==
- Burt Bacharach (1928–2023)

Promises, Promises (1968)
The Look of Love (2003)

- David Baker (1926–1988)

Phoenix '55 (1955)
Copper and Brass (1957)
Smiling, the Boy Fell Dead (1961)
Come Summer (1969)

- Evelyn Baker

The Catch of the Season (1904); music also by Herbert Haines
The Talk of the Town (1905); music also by Herbert Haines
My Darling (1907); music also by Herbert Haines

- Thomas Baker

The Black Crook (1866); music also by George Bickwell, Giuseppe Operti

- Jon Balcourt (b. 1985)

The Neverending Story
Across the Way
Forbidden Fruit
Idol: The Musical (2007)

- Glen Ballard (b. 1953)

Ghost (2011); music also by Dave Stewart

- Sara Bareilles (b. 1979)

Waitress (2015)

- Jiří Bareš

451° Fahrenheita (1993)
Romeo a Julie (2002)

- Jeanne Bargy (1921–1993)

Greenwich Village, U.S.A. (1960)
Pinocchio (1965)

- Wayne Barker (b. 1965)

Clue: The Musical (1997); music also by Galen Blum, Vinnie Martucci
Peter and the Starcatcher (2012)

- Gary Barlow (b. 1971)

Never Forget (2007)
Finding Neverland (2012); music also by Eliot Kennedy
Calendar Girls (2015); previous title The Girls

- Billy Barnes (1927–2012)

The Billy Barnes Revue (1959)
The Billy Barnes People (1961)
Billy Barnes' L.A. (1962)
Blame It on the Movies: The Reel Music of Hollywood (1989)
Billy Barnes Revued (1999)

- Charles Barnes

Priorities of 1942 (1942); music also by Marjery Fielding

- Eric Lane Barnes (b. 1960)

Fairy Tales (1995)

- Mark Baron

Frankenstein - A New Musical (2007)

- John Barry (1933–2011)

Passion Flower Hotel (1965)
Lolita, My Love (1971)
Billy (1974)
The Little Prince and the Aviator (1981)
Brighton Rock (2004)

- Debra Barsha

Radiant Baby (2003)

- Lionel Bart (1930–1999)

Fings Ain't Wot They Used T'Be (1959)
Oliver! (1960); also a 1968 film
Blitz! (1962)
Maggie May (1964)
Twang! (1965)
La Strada (1969)

- Fred Barton (b. 1958)

Miss Gulch Returns! – The Wicked Musical (1985)

- Neil Bartram

The Story of My Life (2008)
The Theory of Relativity (2014)

- William H. Batchelor

Sinbad (1891)

- Matt Batt (b. 1949)

The Hunting of the Snark (1991)

- Jim Bauer

The Blue Flower (2011)

- Clark Baxtresser

A Very Potter Senior Year (2012); music also by Darren Criss, A.J. Holmes, Pierce Siebers

- The Beach Boys

Good Vibrations (2005); music also by Brian Wilson

- Beaker

Canticle of the Plains (1997); music also by Rich Mullins, Mitch McVicker

- Gilbert Bécaud (1927–2001)

Roza (1987)

- Hank Beebe (1926–2023)

Tuscaloosa's Calling Me...But I'm Not Going (1975)

- Bee Gees (Robin Gibb, Barry Gibb, Maurice Gibb)

Saturday Night Fever (1998); also a 1977 film

- Louie Bellson (1924–2009)

Portofino (1958); music also by Will Irwin

- Ralph Benatzky (1884–1957)

The White Horse Inn (1936); music also by others

- Robert Bendorff (1951–1996)

Strike (1985)
Scratch the Surface (1989)
Adorable Me! The Totie Fields Story (1990)
Aka, Henry Sugar (1992)
Over My Dead Body (1992, 1995)
Totie (1993)
Stop the Parade (1994)
Eleanor of Aquitaine (1995–1996)
Great Expectations (1995)

- Quint Benedetti (1926–2014)

Topsy (1984)

- Nell Benjamin

Cam Jansen (2004); music also by Laurence O'Keefe
Legally Blonde (2007); music also by Laurence O'Keefe

- James Stewart Bennett

Dogs (1983)

- Mark Bennett

The Hunchback of Notre Dame (1991)

- Robert Russell Bennett (1894–1981)

Great to Be Alive! (1950); music also by Abraham Ellstein

- Casey Bennetto (b. 1969)

Keating! (2005)

- Sara Bareilles

Waitress (2015)

- Henri Berény (1871–1932)

Lord Piccolo (1910, adapted as Little Boy Blue in 1911)
The Girl from Montmartre (1912); music also by Jerome Kern

- Neil Berg

The Prince and the Pauper (1997)
Tim and Scrooge
The Man Who Would Be King
Grumpy Old Men (2008)
The 12 (2010)

- Keith Berger (b. 1952)

Broken Toys (1982)

- Matthew Roi Berger

Fat Camp (2009)

- Michel Berger (1947–1992)

Starmania (1979)
Le Légende de Jimmy (1990)

- Baldwin Bergersen (1914–2000)

Allah Be Praised! (1944); music also by Don Walker
Carib Song (1945)
Small Wonder (1948); music also by Albert Selden
The Crystal Heart (1960)

- Norman Bergman

Strip! (1987)

- Steven Bergman

Jack the Ripper: The Whitechapel Musical (1997)
The Curse of the Bambino (2001)

- Sol Berkowitz (1922–2006)

Nowhere to Go But Up! (1962)

- Irving Berlin (1888–1989)

Ziegfeld Follies of 1910 (1910); music also by others
Ziegfeld Follies of 1911 (1911); music also by others
Watch Your Step (1914)
Stop! Look! Listen! (1915)
Ziegfeld Follies of 1916 (1916); music also by others
The Century Girl (1916); music also by Victor Herbert
The Cohan Revue of 1918 (1917); music also by George M. Cohan
Yip Yip Yaphank (1918)
The Canary (1918); music also by others
Ziegfeld Follies of 1919 (1919); music also by others
Ziegfeld Follies of 1920 (1920); music also by others
Music Box Revue (1921)
Music Box Revue (1922)
Music Box Revue (1923)
Music Box Revue (1924)
The Cocoanuts (1925); also a 1929 film
Ziegfeld Follies of 1927 (1927)
Face the Music (1932)
As Thousands Cheer (1933)
Louisiana Purchase (1940)
This Is the Army (1942); also a 1943 film
Annie Get Your Gun (1946)
Miss Liberty (1949)
Call Me Madam (1950); also a 1953 film
Mr. President (1962)
There's No Business Like Show Business (2000)
White Christmas (2001)
The Tin Pan Alley Rag (2009); music also by Scott Joplin
Top Hat (2011)

- Norman L. Berman (b. 1949)

Strider: The Story of a Horse (1979); music also by Mark Razovsky, S. Vetkin
First Kids (2010)

- James Bernard (1925–2001)

Virtue in Danger (1963)

- Danny K Bernstein

Far From Canterbury (2015)

- Douglas Bernstein

A Backer's Audition (1992); music also by Denis Markell

- Elmer Bernstein (1922–2004)

How Now, Dow Jones (1967)
Thoroughly Modern Millie (1967 film); music also by James Van Heusen
Merlin (1983)

- Leonard Bernstein (1918–1990)

On the Town (1944)
Peter Pan (1950)
Wonderful Town (1953)
Candide (1956)
West Side Story (1957)
A Party with Betty Comden and Adolph Green (1958); music also by Jule Styne, André Previn, Saul Chaplin, Roger Edens
The Race to Urga (1969)
1600 Pennsylvania Avenue (1976)

- Rick Besoyan (1924–1970)

Little Mary Sunshine (1959)
The Student Gypsy (1963)
Babes in the Wood (1964)

- Henri Betti (1917–2005)

Folies Bergère of 1964 (1964); music also by Georges Ulmer

- Jim Betts

Little Women

- Prince Chakrband Bhumibol (1927–2016)

Michael Todd's Peep Show (1950)

- Nick Bicât (b. 1949)

The Knife (1987)

- George Bickwell

The Black Crook (1866); music also by Thomas Baker, Giuseppe Operti

- Bernie Bierman (1908–2012)

The Farmer Weds a Widow (1998)
We Have Something to Say (1999)

- Gene Bissell

New Faces of 1968 (1968)

- Michael Bitterman

Five After Eight (1979)
Discovering Magenta (1998)

- Georges Bizet (1838–1875)

Carmen Jones (1943); also a 1954 film

- Frank Black (1894–1968)

The Duchess Misbehaves (1946)

- Bryan Blackburn (1928–2004)

Come Spy with Me (1966)

- Richard Blackford (b. 1954)

King: A Musical Testimony (1990)

- Nick Blaemire

Glory Days (2008)

- Alan Blaikley (1940–2022)

Mardi Gras (1976); music also by Ken Howard

- Rikki Beadle-Blair (b. 1961)

Stonewall (2006)

- Eubie Blake (1883–1983)

Shuffle Along (1921)
Keep Shufflin' (1928)
Shuffle Along of 1933 (1932)
Shuffle Along of 1952 (1952); music also by Joseph Meyer
Eubie! (1978)
Shuffle Along, or, the Making of the Musical Sensation of 1921 and All That Followed (2016); music also by Noble Sissle

- Howard Blake (b. 1938)

Granpa (1988)

- Ralph Blane (1914–1995)

Best Foot Forward (1941); music also by Hugh Martin; also a 1943 film
Three Wishes for Jamie (1952)
Meet Me in St. Louis (1989); music also by Hugh Martin; also a 1944 film

- Lawrence J. Blank (b. 1952)

Christy (1975)

- Jean Blaute

Suske en Wiske (1994)

- Jerry Blatt

Tricks (1973)

- Jeff Blim (b. 1984)

The Trail to Oregon! (2014)
The Guy Who Didn't Like Musicals (2018)
Black Friday (2019)
Nerdy Prudes Must Die (2023)
Cinderella's Castle (2024)

- Marc Blitzstein (1905–1964)

The Cradle Will Rock (1938)
No for an Answer (1941)
Regina (1949)
Juno (1959)

- Frederic Block

Professionally Speaking (1986); music also by Ernst Muller, Peter Winkler

- Frankie Blue

I Kissed a Vampire (2009)

- Galen Blum

Clue: The Musical (1997); music also by Wayne Barker, Vinnie Martucci

- Jeff Blumenkrantz (b. 1965)

Urban Cowboy (2003); music also by Jason Robert Brown and others

- Morris Bobrow

Are We Almost There? (2001)
Shopping! (2006)
Party of Two (2010)

- Jerry Bock (1928–2010)

Mr. Wonderful (1956); music also by Larry Holofcener, George David Weiss
The Body Beautiful (1958)
Fiorello! (1959)
Tenderloin (1960)
Man in the Moon (1963)
She Loves Me (1963)
To Broadway with Love (1964)
Fiddler on the Roof (1964); also a 1971 film
Baker Street (1965); music also by Marian Grudeff, Raymond Jessel
The Apple Tree (1966)
The Rothschilds (1970)
Regards to the Lindsay Years (1973)
The Umbrellas of Cherbourg (1979)

- Paul Bogaev (b. 1953)

Bunty Berman Presents... (2013); music also by Ayub Khan-Din

- Craig Bohmler (b. 1956)

Gunmetal Blues (1989)
Enter the Guardsman (1997)

- Eli Bolin

I Sing (2001)

- Christopher Bond (b. 1945)

Evil Dead: The Musical (2006); music also by Frank Cipolla, Melissa Morris, George Reinblatt

- Boney M.

Daddy Cool (2006); music also by others

- Bono (b. 1960); music also by The Edge

Spider-Man: Turn Off the Dark (2010)

- Alexander Borodin (1833–1887)

Kismet (1953); music adapted by Robert Wright, George Forrest; also a 1955 film

- Jeff Bowen (b. 1971)

[title of show] (2006)
Now. Here. This. (2012)

- Paul Bowles (1910–1999)

Liberty Jones (1941)

- Rob Bowman

Hot Mikado (1986); music adapted from music by Arthur Sullivan

- Boy George (b. 1961)

Taboo (2002)

- Alex Bradford (1927–1978)

Your Arms Too Short to Box with God (1976); music also by Micki Grant

- David Braham (1838–1905)

The Mulligan Guard Ball (1879)
Harrigan 'n Hart (1985); music also by Max Showalter, Edward Harrigan

- Philip Braham (1881–1934)

Tails Up! (1918)
London Calling! (1923); music also by Noël Coward

- Caryl Brahms (1901–1982)

Cindy-Ella or I Gotta Shoe (1962); music also by Ned Sherrin

- Oscar Brand (1920–2016)

A Joyful Noise (1966); music also by Paul Nassau
The Education of H*Y*M*A*N K*A*P*L*A*N (1968); music also by Paul Nassau
How to Steal an Election (1968)

- Johnny Brandon (1925–2017)

Cindy (1964)
billy noname (1970)
Ain't Doin' Nothin' But Singin' My Song (1982)
Oh, Diahne! (1997)

- Mike Brandt

Exchange (1970); music also by Michael Knight, Robert J. Lowery

- Lumpy Brannan

Hear! Hear! (1955)

- Stephen Bray (b. 1956)

The Color Purple (2005); music also by Brenda Russell, Allee Willis

- Stuart Brayson

From Here to Eternity (2013)

- Matthew Breindel (b. 1947)

A Hatful of Snow (1994)

- Jacques Brel (1929–1978)

Jacques Brel Is Alive and Well and Living in Paris (1968)
Jacques Brel: The Rage To Live (2007)

- Peter Brewis

The Gambler (1986)

- Edie Brickell (b. 1966)

Bright Star (2014); music also by Steve Martin

- Leslie Bricusse (1931–2021)

Stop the World – I Want to Get Off (1961); music also by Anthony Newley
Fool Britannia (1963)
The Roar of the Greasepaint – The Smell of the Crowd (1965); music also by Anthony Newley
Scrooge (1970 film)
Willy Wonka & the Chocolate Factory (1971 film)
The Good Old Bad Old Days (1972); music also by Anthony Newley
The Traveling Music Show (1978)
Goodbye, Mr. Chips (1982)
Doctor Dolittle (1998)
Sherlock Holmes: The Musical (1989)

- Jonathan Brielle

Nightmare Alley (1996)

- John R. Briggs

Play Me a Country Song (1982); music also by Harry Manfredini
Dracula: A Rock Opera (1997); music also by Dennis West

- Jean Briquet – see Adolf Philipp (1864–1936)
- Cecil Broadhurst (1903–1981)

Space Is So Startling (1962); music also by Richard Hadden and Herbert Allen

- Rob Broadhurst

I'll Be Damned (2010)

- Joseph Brooks (1938–2011)

Metropolis (1989)
In My Life (2005)

- Mel Brooks (b. 1926)

The Producers (2001)
Young Frankenstein (2007)

- Dirk Brossé (b. 1960)

Burger Ubermensch (1989)
Sacco & Vanzetti (1996)
Kuifje: De Zonnetempel (2001)
The Prince of Africa (2002)
Tintin – Le Temple du Soleil (2002)
Rembrandt (2006); music also by Jeroen Englebert
Daens (2008)
14–18 (2014)

- Michele Brourman

Heartbeats (1989); music also by Amanda McBroom, Gerald Sternbach, Tom Snow

- Al W. Brown

The Passing Show of 1913 (1913); music also by Jean Schwartz

- Bruce Brown

Breast Wishes (2008)

- Dave Brown

Fearless Frank (1980)

- Jason Robert Brown (b. 1970)

Songs for a New World (1995)
Parade (1998)
The Last Five Years (2001); also a 2014 film
Urban Cowboy (2003); music also by Jeff Blumenkrantz and others
13 (2007)
Honeymoon in Vegas (2012)
The Bridges of Madison County (2013)

- Lew Brown (1893–1958)

Yokel Boy (1939); music also by Charles Tobias, Sam H. Stept

- L. Russell Brown (b. 1940)

The Sunset Gang (1992)

- Michael Brown (1920–2014)

Different Times (1972)

- Harvey Brown

That Girl at the Bijou (1956)

- Nacio Herb Brown (1896–1964)

Take a Chance (1932); music also by Richard A. Whiting, Vincent Youmans
Singin' in the Rain (1983)

- Oscar Brown, Jr. (1926–2005)

Buck White (1969)

- Scott Brown (b. 1976)

Gutenberg! The Musical! (2005); music also by Anthony King

- Steve Brown (1954–2024)

Spend Spend Spend (1998)
I Can't Sing! The X Factor Musical (2014)

- Gloria Bruni

The Thorn Birds (2009)

- Bob Brush

The First (1981)

- David Bryan (b. 1962)

Memphis (2002)
The Toxic Avenger (2008)

- John Bucchino

Urban Myths (1998), never produced
Lavender Girl (2000); produced as part of 3hree along the musicals by Laurence O'Keefe, Robert Lindsey Nassif
A Catered Affair (2007)

- Nikolai Budaškin – Николай Будашкин (1910–1988)

Mrazík: Pohádkový Muzikál na Ledě (1998); music also by Boris Urbánek; after the 1964 Russian film Jack Frost

- Jimmy Buffett (1946–2023)

Don't Stop the Carnival (1997)
Escape to Margaritaville (2017)

- Sharon Burgett

The Secret Garden (1986)

- Irving Burgie (1924–2019)

Ballade for Bimshire (1963)

- Johnny Burke (1908–1964)

Donnybrook! (1961)
Swinging on a Star (1995); music also by others

- Artie Butler

The People in the Picture (2011); music also by Mike Stoller

- Julian Butler

Space Family Robinson (2002); music also by Stephen Butler

- David Byrne (b. 1952)

Here Lies Love (2013); music also by Fatboy Slim

== C ==
- Robert W. Cabell (b. 1955)

Z: The Masked Musical (1998)

- Michael Calderwood

Slasher (1988)

- Gérard Calvi (1922–2015)

La Plume de Ma Tante (1958)
La Grosse Valise (1965)

- John Cameron (b. 1944)

Zorro (2008); music also by Gipsy Kings

- Norman Campbell (1924–2004)

Anne of Green Gables (1965)

- José María Cano (b. 1959)

Hoy No Me Puedo Levantar (2005); music also by Nacho Cano

- Nacho Cano (b. 1963)

Hoy No Me Puedo Levantar (2005); music also by José María Cano

- Shlomo Carlebach (1925–1994)

Soul Doctor (2010)

- Hoagy Carmichael (1899–1981)

Walk With Music (1940)
Stardust (1987); music also by Benny Goodman, Duke Ellington, Leroy Anderson

- Al Carmines (1936–2005)

Home Movies (1964)
Promenade (1965)
Pomegranada (1966)
Peace (1968)
In Circles (1968)
W.C. (1971)
The Faggot (1973)

- Craig Carnelia (b. 1949)

Working (1978); music also by Stephen Schwartz, Mary Rodgers, James Taylor, Micki Grant
Is There Life after High School? (1982)
Three Postcards (1987)
Pictures in the Hall (1990)
Cast of Thousands (1995)
Notes

- Leon Carr (1910–1976)

The Secret Life of Walter Mitty (1964)

- Brad Carroll

Lend Me a Tenor (2007)

- Earl Carroll (1893–1948)

So Long, Letty (1916)
Canary Cottage (1916)
Earl Carroll's Vanities of 1923 (1923)
Earl Carroll's Vanities of 1924 (1924)

- Harry Carroll (1892–1962)

The Passing Show of 1914 (1914); music also by Sigmund Romberg
Dancing Around (1914); music also by Sigmund Romberg
Maid in America (1915); music also by Sigmund Romberg

- Ivan Caryll (1860–1921)

The Shop Girl (1894)
The Girl from Paris (The Gay Parisienne) (1896)
A Runaway Girl (1898); music also by Lionel Monckton
The Earl and the Girl (1904)
Our Miss Gibbs (1909); music also by Lionel Monckton
The Pink Lady (1911)
The Girl Behind the Gun (1918)
Kissing Time (1919); 1920 Broadway version with music also by William Daly

- Warren Casey (1935–1988)

Grease (1972); music also by Jim Jacobs; also a 1978 film

- Sue Casson

The Happy Prince (1993)

- Carter Cathcart (b. 1954)

Possessed (1990)

- Michael Cavelli

St. Joan (1993)

- Simon Chamberlin

Mrs Henderson Presents (2015); music also by George Fenton

- Harry Chapin (1942–1981)

The Night That Made America Famous (1975)
Cotton Patch Gospel (1981)
Lies and Legends: The Musical Stories of Harry Chapin (1985)

- Saul Chaplin (1912–1997)

Bonanza Bound (1947)
A Party with Betty Comden and Adolph Green (1958); music also by Leonard Bernstein, Jule Styne, André Previn, Roger Edens

- Frederick Chappelle

Pins and Needles of 1922 (1922); music also by James F. Hanley

- Philip Charig (1902–1960)

Yes, Yes, Yvette (1927); music also by Ben Jerome
Just Fancy (1927); music also by Joseph Meyer
That's a Good Girl (1928); music also by Joseph Meyer
Polly (1929); music also by Herbert Stothart
Sweet and Low (1930); music also by others
Stand Up and Sing (1931)
Nikki (1931)
Artists and Models of 1943 (1943); music also by Dan Shapiro, Milton Pascal
Follow the Girls (1944); music also by Dan Shapiro, Milton Pascal
Catch a Star! (1955); music also by Sammy Fain

- Mark "Moose" Charlap (1928–1974)

Peter Pan (1954); music also by Jule Styne
Whoop-Up (1958)
The Conquering Hero (1961)
Kelly (1965)
Clownaround (1972)

- Philippe Chatel (1948–2021)

émilie jolie (1979)

- Gary Cherpakov

Oh, Johnny (1982)
Madison Avenue (1984)

- Guo Sai Cheung

Snow.Wolf.Lake (1997); music also by Dick Lee, Iskanada Ismail, Lam Ming Yeung

- Ralph Chicorel (b. 1930)

Great Expectations (1995)
Anna Karenina, The Audio Musical (2003)

- Paul Chihara (b. 1938)

Shōgun: The Musical (1990)

- Kirsten Childs (b.1952)

The Bubbly Black Girl Sheds Her Cameleon Skin (2000)

- Richard B. Chodosh

The Streets of New York (1963)
Berlin Is Mine (1966)

- Frank Churchill (1901–1942)

Snow White and the Seven Dwarfs (1979); also a 1937 film

- Frank Cipolla

Evil Dead: The Musical (2006); music also by Christopher Bond, Melissa Morris, George Reinblatt

- Brandy Clark (b. 1975)

Shucked (2022); music also by Shane McAnally

- Petula Clark (b. 1932)

Someone Like You (1989)

- Stephen Clark

Dick Whittington (1999)

- Pippa Cleary (b. 1986)

The Secret Diary of Adrian Mole Aged 13¾ (musical) (2015)
My Son's a Queer (But What Can You Do?) (2021)
The Great British Bake Off Musical (2022)

- Jimmy Cliff (b. 1948)

The Harder They Come (2006)

- John Clifton (b. 1935)

Man with a Load of Mischief (1966)
El Bravo! (1981)

- Philip Close

Lament The Musical (2007)

- Gordon Clyde (1933–2008)

Kisses on a Postcard (2004); music also by John Altman

- Riccardo Cocciante (b. 1946)

Notre Dame de Paris (1998)
Le Petit Prince (2002)
Giulietta e Romeo (2007)

- Gregg Coffin

Cinderella (1999)
Convenience (2002)
Five Course Love (2004)
rightnextto me (2007)

- George M. Cohan (1878–1942)

The Governor's Son (1901)
Running for Office (1903)
Little Johnny Jones (1904)
Forty-five Minutes from Broadway (1906)
George Washington, Jr. (1906)
The Honeymooners (1907)
The Talk of New York (1907)
Fifty Miles from Boston (1908)
The Yankee Prince (1908)
The American Idea (1908)
The Man Who Owns Broadway (1909)
The Little Millionaire (1911)
Vera Violetta (1911); music also by Edmund Eysler, Jean Schwartz, Louis A. Hirsch
Hello, Broadway! (1914)
The Cohan Revue 1916 (1916)
The Cohan Revue 1918 (1917); music also by Irving Berlin
The Voice of McConnell (1918)
The Royal Vagabond (1919); music also by Anselm Goetzl
Little Nellie Kelly (1922); also a 1940 film
The Rise of Rosie O'Reilly (1923)
The Merry Malones (1927)
Billie (1928)
George M! (1968)
George M. Cohan Tonight! (2006)

- Douglas J. Cohen

No Way to Treat a Lady (1987)
The Opposite of Sex (2004)
The Gig (2007)

- Michael Cohen (b. 1938)

Yours, Anne (1985)
I Am Anne Frank (1996)

- Robert S. Cohen

Suburb (2001)

- Robert Colby (1922–1987)

Half-past Wednesday (1962)

- Cy Coleman (1929–2004)

Wildcat (1960)
Little Me (1962)
Sweet Charity (1966)
Seesaw (1973)
I Love My Wife (1977)
On the Twentieth Century (1978)
Barnum (1980)
Welcome to the Club (1989)
City of Angels (1989)
The Life (1990)
The Will Rogers Follies (1991)
Exactly Like You (1999)
Ostrovsky (2004)
Pamela's First Musical (2008)
The Best Is Yet to Come: The Music of Cy Coleman (2011)

- Phil Collins (b. 1951)

Tarzan (2006); also a 1999 animated film

- Robert Collister

Captive (1998)

- Harry Connick, Jr. (b. 1967)

Thou Shalt Not (2001)

- Kevin Connors

Prime Time Prophet (1993)

- Con Conrad (1891–1938)

Betty Lee (1924); music also by Louis A. Hirsch
Kitty's Kisses (1926)

- Roger Cook (b. 1940)

Beautiful and Damned (2004); music also by Les Reed

- Will Marion Cook (1869–1944)

The Casino Girl (1900)
Uncle Eph's Christmas (1901)
In Dahomey (1903)
The Southerners (1904)
Abyssinia (1906); music also by Bert Williams
Bandanna Land (1908)

- J. Fred Coots (1897–1985)

Sally, Irene and Mary (1922)
Artists and Models of 1924 (1924); music also by Sigmund Romberg
Artists and Models of 1925 (1925); music also by Alfred Goodman, Maurice Rubens
June Days (1925)
Gay Paree (1925)
The Merry World (1926)
A Night in Paris (1926); music also by Maurie Rubens
White Lights (1927)
Sons o' Guns (1929)

- Adam Cork

London Road (2011)

- Martin Coslett

The Perfect City (2013)

- C. C. Courtney

Salvation (1969); music also by Peter Link

- Randy Courts

The Gifts of the Magi (1988); music also by Steven M. Alper

- Noël Coward (1899–1973)

The Light Blues (1916); music also by others
London Calling! (1923); music also by Philip Braham
On with the Dance (1925); music also by others
This Year of Grace (1928)
Bitter Sweet (1929)
Cavalcade (1931); music also by others
Words and Music (1932)
Conversation Piece (1934)
Tonight at 8.30 (1936)
Operette (1938)
Set to Music (1939)
Sigh No More (1945)
Pacific 1860 (1946)
Ace of Clubs (1950)
After the Ball (1954)
Sail Away (1961)
The Girl Who Came to Supper (1963)
Noël Coward's Sweet Potato (1968)
Oh, Coward! (1972)
Cowardy Custard (1972)
Noël and Gertie (1986)
A Talent to Amuse (1994)
Let's Do It! (1994); music also by Cole Porter
If Love Were All (1998)

- Paul Crabtree

Tennessee, USA! (1965)

- Larry Crane

We'd Rather Switch (1969)

- Lor Crane

Whispers on the Wind (1970)

- Mike Craver

Oil City Symphony (1986); music also by Mark Hardwick, Debra Monk, Mary Murfitt
Radio Gals (1995); music also by Mark Hardwick

- Greg Crease

Someone's Son (1999)

- Luigi Creatore (1920–2015)

Maggie Flynn (1968); music also by Hugo Peretti, George David Weiss

- Darren Criss (b. 1987)

A Very Potter Musical (2009); music also by A.J. Holmes
Me and My Dick (2009); music also by A.J. Holmes, Carlos Valdes
A Very Potter Sequel (2010)
Starship (2011)
A Very Potter Senior Year (2012); music also by Clark Baxtresser, A.J. Holmes, Pierce Siebers

- Rick Crom (b. 1957)

Space Trek (1997)
Newsical, the Musical (2004)

- Jonathan Croose

Saucy Jack and the Space Vixens (1998); music also by Robin Forrest, Adam Meggido

- Anthony Crowley

Tribe (2004)

- Jim Crozier

Touch (1970); music also by Kenn Long

- Raphael Crystal

Kuni-Leml (1984)

- Philip Culkin

Marjorie (1924); music also by Sigmund Romberg, Herbert Stothart, Stephen Jones

- Christopher Curtis

Chaplin (2010); also known as Limelight: The Story of Charlie Chaplin

- Gene Curty

The Lieutenant (1975); music also by Nitra Scharfman, Chuck Strand

- Charles Cuvillier (1877–1955)

Flora Bella (1916); music also by Milton Schwartzwald
Afgar (1919)

== D ==
- Robert Dahdah

Curley McDimple (1967)

- William Daly (1887–1936)

Everything (1918); music also by others
Kissing Time (1919); music also by Ivan Caryll; Daly contributed one song to the 1920 Broadway production
For Goodness Sake (1922); music also by Paul Lannin
Our Nell (1923); music also by George Gershwin
Jack and Jill (1923); music also by others

- Barbara Damashek

Quilters (1984)

- Jeff Daniels

Time (1986); music also by David Pomeranz

- Stan Daniels (1934–2007)

So Long, 174th Street (1976)
Enter Laughing (2008)

- Harold Danko (b. 1947)

A Matter of Opinion (1980); music also by John Jacobson

- John Dankworth (1927–2010)

Colette (1980)

- Roberto Danova (b. 1937)

The Phantom of the Opera on Ice (1995)

- Michael Dansicker

Twenty Fingers, Twenty Toes (1989)

- Ron Dante (b. 1945)

Billy (1969); music also by Gene Allan

- August Darnell (b. 1950)

In a Pig's Valise (1989)

- Herbert Darnley (1872–1947)

Mr. Wix of Wickham (1902); music also by George Everard; 1904 Broadway version with additional songs by Jerome Kern

- Arthur Darvill (b. 1982)

Been So Long (2009)
Fantastic Mr Fox (2016)

- Shaun Davey (b. 1948)

James Joyce's The Dead (1999)

- Michal David (b. 1960)

Kleopatra (2002)
Tři mušketýři (2004)

- Victor Davies (b. 1939)

Beowulf (1974)

- Benny Davis (1985–1979)

Take a Bow (1944); music also by Ted Murray

- Buster Davis (1918–1987)

Doctor Jazz (1975); music also by Luther Henderson

- Carl Davis

The Vackees

- Kingsley Day

Summer Stock Murder

- Reginald de Koven (1859–1920)

The Begum (1887)
Don Quixote (1889)
Robin Hood (1890)
The Knickerbockers (1892)
The Algerian (1893)
The Fencing Master (1893)
Rob Roy (1894)
The Tzigane (1895)
The Mandarin (1896)
The Highwayman (1897)
The Man in the Moon (1899); music also by Ludwig Engländer, Gustav Kerker
The Three Dragoons (1899)
Papa's Wife (1899)
Foxy Quiller (1900)
The Little Duchess (1901)
Maid Marian (1902); 2nd version of Robin Hood
The Jersey Lily (1903)
The Red Feather (1903)
Happyland (1905)
The Student King (1906)
The Girls of Holland (1907)
The Golden Butterfly (1908)
The Beauty Spot (1909)
The Wedding Trip (1911)
Her Little Highness (1913)

- Stephen DeCesare

Santa Claus and the Christ Child (1994)
The Competition (1995)
Rage of Love (1995)
My Daddy Jesus (1996)
Jesus Is The Reason For The Season (1996)
The Easter Pageant That Almost Wasn't (1997)
Fourth Wise Man (1997)
Our Lady Of Fatima (1998)
Bearskin (2001)
Everyman (2001)
Why The Chimes Rang (2001)
Alpha and Omega: Maranatha (2001)
Christmas Every Day (2002)
Prodigal Son (2002)
Little Red Riding Hood (2003)
A Christmas Carol (2003)
Juggler Of Notre Dame (2003)
Princess Aleia (2003)
Noel Candle (2004)
Kolbe (2004)
Picture of Dorian Gray (2005)
Feo (The Ugly Duckling) (2006)
Passion (2007)
What Would Jesus Do? (2008)
Bible Rock (2008)
The Selfish Giant (2009)
Faustina (2010)
Jungle Book (2011)
The Gift Of The Magi (2011)
Peter Rabbit (2012)

- Jackie Dempsey

Squonk: Bigsmörgåsbørdwünderwerk (1999)

- Robert Dennis (member of The Open Window)

Oh! Calcutta! (1969); music also by Peter Schickele, Stanley Walden

- Gene de Paul (1919–1988)

Li'l Abner (1956); also a 1959 film
Seven Brides for Seven Brothers (1982); music also by Al Kasha, Joel Hirschhorn; also a 1954 film

- Joel Derfner (b. 1973)

Blood Drive (2003)
Signs of Life (2009)

- Peter DeRose (1900–1953)

Earl Carroll's Vanities of 1940 (1940); music also by Charles Rosoff

- Frédérick Desroches

Second Chance (2009)

- Dennis DeYoung (b. 1947)

The Hunchback of Notre Dame (1996)
The 101 Dalmatians (2009)

- Robert Emmett Dolan (1908–1972)

Texas, Li'l Darlin' (1949)
Not for Children (1951)
Foxy (1964)

- Stephen Dolginoff

One Foot Out the Door (1993)
Most Men Are (1995)
Journey to the Center of the Earth (1999)
Thrill Me: The Leopold & Loeb Story (2003)
Panic (2009)

- Walter Donaldson (1893–1947)

Sweetheart Time (1926); music also by Joseph Meyer
Whoopee! (1928); also a 1930 film

- Steve Dorff (b. 1949)

Lunch (1994)

- Ian Dorricott (b. 1949)

Man of Steel (1978)
Bats (1983)

- Jill Dowse

Thatcher The Musical (2006)

- Stephen Downs

Festival (1979)

- James P. Doyle

The Wonderful Wizard of Oz (2000)

- Ervin Drake (1919–2015)

What Makes Sammy Run? (1964)
Her First Roman (1968)

- John Driver

Ride the Winds (1974)
Scrambled Feet (1979); music also by Jeffery Haddow

- Matt Dubey

Smith (1973); music also by Dean Fuller

- Andy Duerden

Bliss (2000)

- Gordon Duffy

Happy Town (1959)

- Vernon Duke (1893–1969)

The Garrick Gaieties (1930)
Walk a Little Faster (1932)
Ziegfeld Follies of 1934 (1934); music also by others
Ziegfeld Follies of 1936 (1936)
The Show Is On (1936); music also by others
Cabin in the Sky (1940); also a 1943 film
Banjo Eyes (1941)
The Lady Comes Across (1942)
Jackpot (1944)
Sadie Thompson (1944)
Sweet Bye and Bye (1946)
Two's Company (1952)
The Littlest Revue (1956)
Zenda (1963)
Nashville, New York (1979); music also by Kurt Weill

- John Du Prez (b. 1946)

Spamalot (2005); music also by Eric Idle

- Ann Duquesnay

Bring in 'Da Noise, Bring in 'Da Funk (1995); music also by Daryl Waters and Zane Mark

- Bob Dylan (b. 1941)

The Times They Are a-Changin' (2006)

- Antonín Dvořák (1841–1904)

Summer Song (1956)
Rusalka (1998); musical by Zdeněk John after Dvořák's opera Rusalka

- Richard A. Dworsky

The Marvelous Land of Oz (1981)

== E ==
- Leslie Eberhard

Hey Ma...Kaye Ballard (1984); music also by David Levy

- Roger Edens (1905–1970)

A Party with Betty Comden and Adolph Green (1958); music also by Leonard Bernstein, Jule Styne, André Previn, Saul Chaplin

- The Edge (b. 1961); music also by Bono

Spider-Man: Turn Off the Dark (2010)

- Anderson Edwards

Thunder Knocking at the Door (2002); music also by Keb' Mo'

- Leo Edwards (1886–1978)

The Passing Show of 1915 (1915); music also by J. Leubrie Hill, William Frederick Peters
You'll See Stars (1942)

- Sherman Edwards (1919–1981)

1776 (1969)

- Stephen Edwards

Tess of the d'Urbervilles (1999)
Moon Landing (2007)

- Michael Edwin

Shabbatai (1995); music also by Michael Shubert

- Bertha Egnos (1913–2003)

Ipi-Tombi (1974)

- Danny Elfman (b. 1953)

Edward Scissorhands (2006); music also by Terry Davies

- Ron Eliran (b. 1934)

Don't Step on My Olive Branch (1976)
Nightsong (1977)

- Peter Elkstrom

Doctor Doctor (1997)

- John Eller

Adonis (1884); music also by Edward E. Rice

- Duke Ellington (1899–1974)

Beggar's Holiday (1946)
My People (1963)
Pousse-Café (1966)
Sophisticated Ladies (1981); music also by others
Stardust (1987); music also by Hoagy Carmichael, Benny Goodman, Leroy Anderson
A Drum Is a Woman (1996)
Play On! (1997)

- Justin Ellington

The Seven (2006); music by Will Power, Will Hammond

- Don Elliott (1926–1984)

A Thurber Carnival (1960)
The Beast in Me (1963)

- Vivian Ellis (1904–1996)

Mr. Cinders (1929); music also by Richard Myers
Bless the Bride (1947)
The Water Gipsies (1954)
Listen to the Wind (1955)

- Abraham Ellstein (1907–1963)

Great to Be Alive! (1950); music also by Robert Russell Bennett
Yiddle with a Fiddle (1997); also a 1936 film: Yidl Mitn Fidl

- Ludwig Engländer (1851–1914)

The Man in the Moon (1899); music also by Gustav Kerker, Reginald Dekoven

- Jeroen Englebert

Rembrandt (2006); music also by Dirk Brossé

- Jon English (1949–2016)

Paris (2003)

- Joe Ercole (b. 1951)

Ka-Boom! (1980)

- Alfeuso Esposite

Siddhartha (2007); music also by Jude Gitamondoc, Joseph Abella

- David Essex (b. 1947)

Mutiny! (1985)

- Albert Evans

Pageant (1991)

- David Evans

Birds of Paradise (1987)
Children's Letters to God (2004)

- Ray Evans (1915–2007)

Aaron Slick from Punkin Crick (1952); music also by Jay Livingston
Oh, Captain! (1958); music also by Jay Livingston
Let It Ride (1961); music also by Jay Livingston

- George Everard

Mr. Wix of Wickham (1902); music also by Herbert Darnley; 1904 Broadway version with additional songs by Jerome Kern

- Edmund Eysler (1874–1949)

Vera Violetta (1911); music also by George M. Cohan, Jean Schwartz, Louis A. Hirsch
The Laughing Husband (1914); music also by Jerome Kern, Wimperis
The Blue Paradise (1915); music also by Sigmund Romberg

== F ==
- Daniel Facerias

Le Bal des Exclus

- Scott Fagan

Soon (1971); music also by Joseph M. Kookolis

- Sammy Fain (1902–1989)

Everybody's Welcome (1931)
Hellzapoppin' (1938); music also by Charles Tobias
George White's Scandals of 1939 (1939)
Boys and Girls Together (1940)
Sons o' Fun (1941)
Toplitzky of Notre Dame (1946)
Alive and Kicking (1950); music also by others
Flahooley (1951)
Ankles Aweigh (1955)
Catch a Star (1955); music also by Philip Charig
Christine (1960)
Something More! (1964)
Calamity Jane (1995); also a 1953 film

- Beth Falcone

Wanda's World (2008)

- Leo Fall (1873–1925)

The Siren (1911)
The Doll Girl (1913); additional music by Jerome Kern
The Rose of Stamboul (1922); music also by Sigmund Romberg

- John Farrar (b. 1946)

Heathcliff (1996)
Xanadu (2007); music also by Jeff Lynne

- Fatboy Slim (b. 1963)

Here Lies Love (2013); music also by David Byrne

- Mary Feinsinger

Hot Klezmer (1998); music also by Harold Seletsky

- Jed Feuer

Eating Raoul (1992)

- George Fenton (b. 1949)

Mrs Henderson Presents (2015); music also by Simon Chamberlin

- Addy O. Fieger

Dear Oscar (1972)

- John Field (b. 1962)

Evie and the Birdman

- Marjery Fielding

Priorities of 1942 (1942); music also by Charles Barnes

- Amina Figarova (b. 1964)

Diana: de Musical (2000)

- Elliot Finkel

Finkel's Follies (1991)

- William Finn (1952–2025)

In Trousers (1979)
March of the Falsettos (1981)
America Kicks Up Its Heels (1983)
Romance in Hard Times (1989)
Falsettoland (1990)
Falsettos (1992)
A New Brain (1998)
Infinite Joy (2001)
Elegies: A Song Cycle (2003)
The 25th Annual Putnam County Spelling Bee (2005)
Make Me a Song (2007)
Little Miss Sunshine (2011)

- George Fischoff (1938–2018)

The Prince and the Pauper (1963)
Georgy (1970)
Shephard (1993)

- Stephen Flaherty (b. 1960)

Pitts (1976)
Lucky Stiff (1988)
Once on This Island (1990)
My Favorite Year (1992)
Proposals (1997) (incidental music only)
Ragtime (1996)
Seussical (2000)
A Man of No Importance (2002)
A Long Gay Book (2003); an early version of Loving Repeating
Dessa Rose (2005)
Loving Repeating (2005)
Chita Rivera: The Dancer's Life (2005); music also by others
The Glorious Ones (2007)
Rocky (2012)
Little Dancer (2014)
Anastasia (2016)

- Lewis Flinn

Lysistrata Jones (2011)

- John Foley (b. 1949)

Pump Boys and Dinettes (1981); music also by others

- James-Allen Ford

The Tell Tale Heart and Other Classics (Condensed Classics) (2003)
Martha! The Unauthorized Musical (2005)
If You Give A Mouse A Cookie and Other Storybooks (2006)
In Transit (2016)

- Nancy Ford (b. 1935)

Now Is the Time for All Good Men (1967)
The Last Sweet Days of Isaac (1970)
Shelter (1973)
I'm Getting My Act Together and Taking It on the Road (1978)
The American Girls Revue (1998)
Anne of Green Gables (2007)

- George Forrest (1915–1999)

Song of Norway (1944); music also by Robert Wright, adapted from themes of Edvard Grieg; also a 1970 film
Gypsy Lady (1946); music also by Robert Wright, adapted from themes of Victor Herbert
Magdalena (1948); music also by Robert Wright, adapted from themes of Heitor Villa-Lobos
Kismet (1953); music also by Robert Wright, adapted from themes of Alexander Borodin; also a 1955 film
The Love Doctor (1959); music also by Robert Wright
Kean (1961); music also by Robert Wright
Anya, "Anastasia" (1965); music also by Robert Wright, adapted from themes of Sergei Rachmaninov
The Great Waltz (1930); music also by Robert Wright, adapted from Johann Strauss II
Timbuktu! (1978); music also by Robert Wright
Grand Hotel (1989); music also by Robert Wright, Maury Yeston
Anastasia (revision of Anya) (1991); music also by Robert Wright, adapted from themes of Sergei Rachmaninov

- Robert Forrest

Paradise! (1985)

- Robin Forrest

Saucy Jack and the Space Vixens (1998); music also by Jonathan Croose, Adam Meggido

- John Forster

How to Eat Like a Child (1981)

- Royal Foster

Blackouts of 1949 (1949); music also by Charles Henderson

- Stephen Foster (1826–1864)

The Stephen Foster Story, (Stephen Foster – The Musical) (1959)

- Raymond Fox

Take It Easy (1996)

- Steve Fox

The Gift (2000)

- Erik Frandsen

Song of Singapore (1991); music also by Michael Garin, Robert Hipkins, Paula Lockheart

- Larry Frank

Frank Merriwell: Honor Challenged (1971); music also by Skip Redwine

- Mathew Frank

Prodigal (2000)

- Scott Frankel (b. 1963)

Grey Gardens (2006)
Happiness (2009)
Far from Heaven (2013)
War Paint (2016)

- Mat Fraser (b. 1962)

Thalidomide!! A Musical (2005)

- Harold Fraser-Simson (1872–1944)

The Maid of the Mountains (1916)

- Grenoldo Frazier

Moms (1987)

- Cassius Freeborn

Mam'zelle Champagne (1906)

- Stan Freeman (1920–2001)

I Had a Ball (1964); music also by Jack Lawrence
Lovely Ladies, Kind Gentlemen (1970); music also by Franklin Underwood

- Dorothea Freitag (1914–2001)

Mask and Gown (1957); music also by Ronny Graham, Arthur Siegel

- Rob Fremont

Piano Bar (1978)

- Frederick Freyer

Captains Courageous: The Musical (1999)

- David Friedman (b. 1950)

Chasing Nicolette
Scandalous: The Life and Trials of Aimee Semple McPherson (2005); also known as Saving Aimee; music also by David Pomeranz
Stunt Girl (2009)

- Gary William Friedman

The Me Nobody Knows (1970)
Platinum (1978)
Taking My Turn (1983)
Sunset (1978)
Bring in the Morning (1994)
The Last Supper: A Musical Enactment (1995)
Sheba (1996)
Magpie (2007)
Treasure Island (2012)

- Michael Friedman (1975–2017)

Gone Missing (2003)
Saved (2008)
This Beautiful City (2008)
Bloody Bloody Andrew Jackson (2009)
Love's Labour's Lost (2013)

- Cliff Friend (1893–1974)

Piggy (1927)
George White's Scandals of 1929 (1929); music also by George White, Ray Henderson

- Rudolf Friml (1879–1972)

The Firefly (1912)
High Jinks (1913)
The Peasant Girl (1915)
Katinka (1915)
You're in Love (1917)
Kitty Darlin' (1917)
Sometime (1918)
Gloriana (1918)
Tumble In (1919)
The Little Whopper (1919)
June Love (1921)
Ziegfeld Follies of 1921 (1921); music also by Victor Herbert and others
The Blue Kitten (1922)
Cinders (1923)
Rose-Marie (1924); music also by Herbert Stothart
The Vagabond King (1925)
No Foolin' (1926); title changed during run to Ziegfeld's American Revue of 1926
The Wild Rose (1926)
The White Eagle (1927)
The Three Musketeers (1928)
Luana (1930)
Music Hath Charms (1934)

- Al Frisch (1916–1976)

Bordello (1974)

- Dave Frishberg (1933–2021)

Secrets Every Smart Traveler Should Know (1997); music also by Murray Grand

- Dean Fuller

Smith (1973); music also by Matt Dubey

- Rachel Fuller (b. 1973)

The Boy Who Heard Music (2007); music also by Pete Townshend

- Seymour Furth (1876–1932)

The Mimic World 1908 (1908); music also by Ben Jerome
Bringing Up Father (1925)

== G ==
- Nick Gage

Holy Musical B@man! (2012); music also by Scott Lamps

- Dick Gallagher (1955–2005)

Have I Got a Girl for You (1986)
Whoop-Dee-Doo! (1993); additional music by others
When Pigs Fly!! (1996)

- Kim Hee Gap

The Last Empress (1995)

- Rob Gardner

Blackbeard (2008)

- Brian Gari

Late Nite Comic (1987)
A Hard Time to Be Single (1990)
Love Online (1997)

- Janet Gari

Such a Pretty Face (1994)

- Michael Garin

Song of Singapore (1991); music also by Erik Frandsen, Robert Hipkins, Paula Lockheart

- Enrico Garzilli (b. 1937)

Rage of the Heart (1987)
The Smart Set (1989)

- Clarence Gaskill (1892–1947)

Earl Carroll's Vanities of 1925 (1925)

- Bob Gaudio (b. 1942)

Peggy Sue Got Married (2001)
Jersey Boys (2005)

- Percy Gaunt (1852–1896)

A Trip to Chinatown (1891)

- Noel Gay (1898–1954)

Me and My Girl (1937)
Radio Times (1992)

- Charles Gaynor (1909–1975)

Lend an Ear (1948)
Show Girl (1961)
Irene (1973); music mostly by Harry Tierney

- Stanley J. Gelber

Love and Let Love (1968)

- Gary Geld (b. 1935)

Purlie (1970)
Shenandoah (1974)
Angel (1978)

- Lewis E. Gensler (1896–1978)

Queen o' Hearts (1922); music also by Dudley Wilkinson
Be Yourself! (1924); music also by Milton Schwartzwald
Captain Jinks (1925); music also by Stephen Jones
Queen High (1926); also a 1930 film
Ups-a Daisy (1928)
The Gang's All Here (1931)
Ballyhoo of 1932 (1932)

- Robert Gerlach (b. 1938)

Something's Afoot (1976); music also by James McDonald, David Vos

- Andrew Gerle

Meet John Doe (2007)

- Arthur Gershwin (1900–1981)

A Lady Says Yes (1945); music also by Fred Spielman

- George Gershwin (1898–1937)

Sinbad (1918); music mostly by Sigmund Romberg and others
La-la Lucille (1919)
George White's Scandals of 1920 (1920)
George White's Scandals of 1921 (1921)
A Dangerous Maid (1921)
George White's Scandals of 1922 (1922)
Our Nell (1922); music also by William Daly
George White's Scandals of 1923 (1923)
Sweet Little Devil (1924)
George White's Scandals of 1924 (1924)
Lady, Be Good! (1924)
Primrose (1924)
Tell Me More! (1925)
Tip-Toes (1925)
Song of the Flame (1925); music also by Herbert Stothart; also a 1930 film
Oh, Kay! (1926)
Funny Face (1927)
Rosalie (1928); music also by Sigmund Romberg
Treasure Girl (1928)
Show Girl (1929)
Strike up the Band (1930)
Girl Crazy (1930)
Of Thee I Sing (1931)
Pardon My English (1933)
Let 'Em Eat Cake (1933)
Porgy and Bess (1935)
My One and Only (1983)
Crazy for You (1992)
The Gershwins' Fascinating Rhythm (1999)
American Rhapsody: A New Musical Revue (2000)
Nice Work If You Can Get It (2008)
An American in Paris (2014)

- Rosalie Gerut

Songs of Paradise (1989)

- Clark Gesner (1938–2002)

You're a Good Man, Charlie Brown (1967)
The Utter Glory of Morrissey Hall (1979)
Animal Fair (1990)
The Jello Is Always Red (1998)
The Bloomers (2000)

- Barry Gibb (b. 1946)

Saturday Night Fever (1998); music also by Maurice Gibb, Robin Gibb; also a 1977 film

- Maurice Gibb (1949–2003)

Saturday Night Fever (1998); music also by Barry Gibb, Robin Gibb; also a 1977 film

- Robin Gibb (1949–2012)

Saturday Night Fever (1998); music also by Barry Gibb, Maurice Gibb; also a 1977 film

- Melville Gideon (1884–1933)

Nuts and Wine (1914); music also by Frank E. Tours
The Co-Optimists (1921); music also by others
The Optimists (1928); music also by others

- James Gilbert

Grab Me a Gondola (1956)

- Yves Gilbert

Napoléon (1984)

- Jon Giluntin

Hit the Lights! (1993); additional music by Chris Hajian

- Gipsy Kings

Zorro (2008); music also by John Cameron

- Jude Gitamondoc

Siddhartha (2007); music also by Joseph Abella, Alfeuso Esposite

- Philip Glassborow

The Great Big Radio Show! (1993)

- Ben Glasstone

The Mouse Queen (2006)

- Anselm Goetzl (1878–1923)

The Royal Vagabond (1919); music also by George M. Cohan

- Dan Goggin (b. 1943)

Hark! (1972)
A One-Way Ticket To Broadway (1979)
Nunsense (1985)
Balancing Act (1992)
Nunsense II: The Second Coming (1992)
Nunsense 2: The Sequel (1994)
Nunsense 3: The Jamboree (1995)
Nuncrackers: The Nunsense Christmas Musical (1998)
Nunsense A-Men! (1998)
Meshuggah-Nuns! (2004)
Nunsensations!: The Nunsense Vegas Revue (2005)

- Don Gohman

Ambassador (1971)

- Ernest Gold (1921–1999)

I'm Solomon (1968)

- Ernie Golden (1890–1972)

Artists and Models of 1930 (1930); music also by Harold Stern

- Billy Goldenberg (1936–2020)

Ballroom (1978)

- Elliot Goldenthal (b. 1954)

Juan Darién: A Carnival Mass (1988)
The Green Bird (1996)

- Robert Goldman (1932–2023)

First Impressions (1959); music also by Glenn Paxton, George David Weiss

- Zina Goldrich (b. 1964)

Dear Edwina (2002)
Junie B. Jones (2004)

- Peter Golub

Amphigorey: A Musicale (1994)

- Howard Goodall (b. 1958)

The Hired Man (1984)
Girlfriends (1986)
Days of Hope (1991)
Silas Marner (1993)
The Kissing-Dance (1999)
The Dreaming (2001)
The Winter's Tale (2005)
Two Cities (2006)
Love Story (2010)

- Alfred Goodman (1890–1972)

Artists and Models of 1925 (1925); music also by J. Fred Coots, Maurice Rubens, Sigmund Romberg

- Benny Goodman (1909–1986)

Stardust (1987); music also by Hoagy Carmichael, Duke Ellington, Leroy Anderson

- Bob Goodman

Wild and Wonderful: A Big City Fable (1971)

- Paul Scott Goodman

Bright Lights, Big City (1999)
Rooms: A Rock Romance (2009)

- Carlos Gorbea

Charge It, Please (1991)

- Paul Gordon (b. 1975)

Greetings from Venice Beach (1993)
Jane Eyre (1995)
Emma (2006)
Daddy Long Legs (2009)
Sense and Sensibility (2015)
The Front, music also by Jay Gruska

- Ricky Ian Gordon (b. 1956)

Dream True: My Life with Vernon Dixon (1999)
My Life with Albertine (2003)
Orpheus and Euridice (2006)

- Michael Gore (b. 1951)

Carrie (1988)

- Jay Gorney (1894–1990)

Merry-Go-Round (1927); music also by Henry Souvaine
Earl Carroll's Sketch Book (1929)
Earl Carroll's Vanities of 1930 (1930); music also by Harold Arlen
Americana (1932); music also by Harold Arlen, Herman Hupfeld, Richard Meyers
New Americana (1932); music also by others
Heaven on Earth (1946)
Touch and Go (1949)

- Jack Gottlieb (b. 1930)

Monkey Biz'nis (1992)
After the Flood (1990–91, revised 1995)

- Kath Gotts

Bad Girls (2006)

- John Gould

Betjemania (1976)

- Matt Gould

Witness Uganda (2014); music also by Griffin Matthews

- Morton Gould (1913–1996)

Enter Juliet
Something to Do
Billion Dollar Baby (1945)
Concert Varieties: Interplay (1945)
Arms and the Girl (1950)

- Patrick Gowers (1936–2014)

Share My Lettuce (1957); music also by Keith Statham

- Irvin Graham (1909–2001)

Crazy with the Heat (1941); music also by Rudi Revil, Dana Suesse

- Ronny Graham (1919–1999)

Mask and Gown (1957); music also by Dorothea Freitag, Arthur Siegel

- Ron Grainer (1922–1981)

Robert and Elizabeth (1964)
On the Level (1966)

- Murray Grand (1919–2007)

Secrets Every Smart Traveler Should Know (1997); music also by Dave Frishberg

- Micki Grant (1929–2021)

Don't Bother Me, I Can't Cope (1971)
Your Arms Too Short to Box with God (1976); music also by Alex Bradford
Working (1978); music also by Stephen Schwartz, Mary Rodgers, James Taylor, Craig Carnelia
It's So Nice to Be Civilized (1980)

- John MacLachlan Gray (b. 1946)

Billy Bishop Goes to War (1978); music also by Eric Peterson

- Timothy Gray (1926–2007)

High Spirits (1964); music also by Hugh Martin

- Amanda Green (b. 1965)

Hands on a Hard Body (2012); music also by Trey Anastasio

- John W. "Johnny" Green (1908–1989)

Murder at the Vanities (1933); also a 1934 film
Mr. Whittington (1933)
Beat the Band (1942)

- Green Day

American Idiot (2009)

- Stephen Greenhorn (b. 1964)

Sunshine on Leith (2007)

- Rebecca Greenstein

Plan B (2008)

- Peter Greenwell (1929–2006)

The Crooked Mile (1959)
The Mitford Girls (1981)

- Ellie Greenwich (1940–2009)

Leader of the Pack (1984)

- Jesse Greer (1896–1970)

Shady Lady (1933); music also by Sam H. Stept

- John Gregor

Pinkalicious (2007)

- María Grever (1884–1951)

Viva O'Brien (1941)

- Edvard Grieg (1843–1907)

Song of Norway (1944); music adapted by Robert Wright, George Forrest; also a 1970 film

- Patty Griffin (b. 1964)

10 Million Miles (2007)

- Larry Grossman (b. 1938)

Minnie's Boys (1970)
Goodtime Charley (1975)
Snoopy!! (1975); also a 1988 TV special
A Doll's Life (1982)
Ann Reinking...Music Loves Me (1984)
Grind (1985)
The Gay Century Songbook (2000)
It Must Be Him (2010)

- Marian Grudeff (1927–2006)

Baker Street (1965); music also by Jerry Bock, Raymond Jessel

- Frank Grullon

I Don <3 U Ne Mor (2010); music also by Cathy Thomas

- Bernard Grun (1901–1972)

Balalaika (1936); music also by George Posford

- Bill Grundy (1923–1993)

This Was Burlesque (1965); music also by Sonny Lester

- Robert Grusecki

Greetings from Yorkville (2007)

- Jay Gruska

The Front, music also by Paul Gordon

- John Guare (b. 1938)

Rich and Famous (1976)

- Christopher Guest (b. 1948)

National Lampoon's Lemmings (1973); music also by Paul Jacobs

- Adam Guettel (b. 1964)

Floyd Collins (1994)
Saturn Returns (1998); also known as Myths and Hymns
The Light in the Piazza (2003)
Days of Wine and Roses (2023)

- Adam Gwon (b. 1979)

Bernice Bobs Her Hair (2008)
Ordinary Days (2008)
The Boy Detective Fails (2009)
Cloudlands (2011)
Cake Off (2015)
String (2018)
Scotland, PA (2019)

== H ==
- Richard Hadden

Space Is So Startling (1962); music also by Herbert Allen and Cecil Broadhurst

- Jeffery Haddow (b. 1947)

Scrambled Feet (1979); music also by John Driver

- Manos Hadjidakis (1925–1994)

Illya Darling (1967)

- Albert Hague (1920–2001)

Plain and Fancy (1955)
Redhead (1959)
The Girls Against the Boys (1959); music mostly by Richard Lewine
Café Crown (1964)
The Fig Leaves Are Falling (1969)
Dr. Seuss' How the Grinch Stole Christmas! (1998); music also by Mel Marvin

- Herbert Haines (1880–1923)

The Catch of the Season (1904); music also by Evelyn Baker
The Talk of the Town (1905); music also by Evelyn Baker
The Beauty of Bath (1906)
My Darling (1907); music also by Evelyn Baker
Pebbles on the Beach (1912)

- Chris Hajian

Hit the Lights! (1993); additional music by Jon Giluntin

- Carol Hall (1936–2018)

The Best Little Whorehouse in Texas (1978); also a 1982 film
The Best Little Whorehouse Goes Public (1994)
Max and Ruby (2007)

- Kelly Hamilton

Dance on a Country Grave (1974)
Trixie True, Teen Detective (1979)

- Morris Hamilton (1897–1955)

Earl Carroll's Vanities of 1926 (1926)
Earl Carroll's Vanities of 1928 (1928)

- Marvin Hamlisch (1944–2012)

A Chorus Line (1975); also a 1985 film
They're Playing Our Song (1978)
Jean Seberg (1983)
Smile (1986)
The Goodbye Girl (1993)
Hundreds of Hats (1995); music also by Alan Menken, Jonathan Sheffer
Sweet Smell of Success (2002)

- Will Hammond

The Seven (2006); music by Will Power, Justin Ellington

- Neal Hampton

Sense & Sensibility (2013)

- James F. Hanley (1892–1942)

Robinson Crusoe, Jr. (1916); music also by Sigmund Romberg
Jim Jam Jems (1920)
Pins and Needles of 1922 (1922); music also by Frederick Chappelle
Spice of 1922 (1922)
Big Boy (1925); music also by Joseph Meyer
Honeymoon Lane (1926)
Sidewalks of New York (1927)
Keep It Clean (1929); music also by others
Thumbs Up! (1934); music also by Henry Sullivan

- Glen Hansard (b. 1970)

Once (2011); music also by Markéta Irglová; also a 2006 film

- John Hanson (1922–1998)

Smilin' Through (1972)

- Ronan Hardiman (b. 1961)

Lord of the Dance (1996)

- Alex Harding

Only Heaven Knows (1995)

- Cheryl Hardwick (b. 1944)

Girls, Girls, Girls (1980)

- Mark Hardwick

Pump Boys and Dinettes (1981); music also by others
Oil City Symphony (1986); music also by Mike Craver, Debra Monk, Mary Murfitt
Radio Gals (1995); music also by Mike Craver

- Edward W. Hardy (b. 1992)

The Woodsman (2012)

- Edward Harrigan (1844–1911)

Harrigan 'n Hart (1985); music also by Max Showalter, David Braham

- Ann Harris

Sky High (1979); incidental music by Frederic Harris

- Frederic Harris

Sky High (1979); music also by Ann Harris

- Deborah Harry (b. 1945)

Desperately Seeking Susan (2007)

- Joseph Hart (1858–1921)

The Idea (1892)

- Larry Hart

Sisterella (1996)

- Cherly Harwick

Cut the Ribbons (1992); music also by Mildred Hayden

- James Hatch (1928–2020)

Fly Blackbird (1962); music also by C. Bernard Jackson

- Tony Hatch (b. 1939)

The Card (1973)
Rock Nativity (1976)

- Elmer Hawkes

The Hunchback of Notre Dame (1996)

- John Hawkins

Canterbury Tales (1964); music also by Richard Hill

- Mildred Hayden

Cut the Ribbons (1992); music also by Cherly Harwick

- The Heather Brothers

Big Sin City (1978)
A Slice of Saturday Night (1989)
Lust (1993)

- David Hein (b. 1976)

Come from Away (2013); music also by Irene Sankoff

- Michael Heitzman

Bingo (2005); music also by Ilene Reid, David Holcenberg

- Charles E. Henderson (1907–1970)

Blackouts of 1949 (1949); music also by Royal Foster

- Luther Henderson (1919–2003)

Doctor Jazz (1975); music also by Buster Davis
Jelly's Last Jam (1992); music also by Jelly Roll Morton

- Ray Henderson (1896–1970)

George White's Scandals of 1925 (1925)
George White's Scandals of 1926 (1926)
Good News! (1927)
Manhattan Mary (1927)
George White's Scandals of 1928 (1928); music also by others
Hold Everything! (1928)
Three Cheers (1928); music also by John Raymond Hubbell, Leslie Sarony
Follow Thru (1929); also a 1930 film
George White's Scandals of 1929 (1929); music also by Cliff Friend, George White
Flying High (1930)
George White's Scandals of 1931 (1931)
Hot-Cha! (1932)
Strike Me Pink (1933)
Say When (1934)
George White's Scandals of 1936 (1935); music also by others
Transatlantic Rhythm (1936)
Ziegfeld Follies of 1943 (1943); music also by Dan White

- Nona Hendryx (b. 1944)

Blue (2001)

- David Heneker (1906–2001)

Expresso Bongo (1958); music also by Monty Norman
Make Me an Offer (1959); music also by Monty Norman
The Art of Living (1960); music also by Monty Norman
Half a Sixpence (1963)
Charlie Girl (1965); music also by John Taylor
Jorrocks (1966)
Phil the Fluter (1969)
Popkiss (1972)
The Biograph Girl (1980); music also by John Taylor
Peg (1984)
Half a Sixpence (2016 revised musical); music also by George Stiles and Anthony Drewe

- Chad Henry (b. 1946)

Angry Housewives (1986)
Pinocchio (1996)
The Magic Mrs. Piggle Wiggle (2004)

- Victor Herbert (1859–1924)

Prince Ananias (1894)
The Wizard of the Nile (1895)
The Gold Bug (1896)
The Serenade (1897)
The Idol's Eye (1897)
The Fortune Teller (1898)
Cyrano De Bergerac (1899)
The Singing Girl (1899)
The Ameer (1899)
The Victory (1900)
Babes in Toyland (1903)
Babette (1903)
It Happened in Nordland (1904)
Miss Dolly Dollars (1905)
Wonderland (1905)
Mlle. Modiste (1905)
The Red Mill (1906)
Dream City (1906)
The Magic Knight (1906)
The Tattooed Man (1907)
Algeria (1908)
Little Nemo (1908)
The Prima Donna (1908)
The Rose of Algeria (1909)
Old Dutch (1909)
Naughty Marietta (1910)
When Sweet Sixteen (1911)
The Duchess (1911)
The Enchantress (1911)
The Lady and the Slipper (1912)
Sweethearts (1913)
The Madcap Duchess (1913)
The Only Girl (1914)
The Débutante (1914)
The Princess Pat (1915)
The Century Girl (1916); music also by Irving Berlin
Eileen (1917)
Miss 1917 (1917); music also by Jerome Kern
Her Regiment (1917)
The Velvet Lady (1919)
Angel Face (1919)
My Golden Girl (1920)
Sally (1920); music also by Jerome Kern
The Girl in the Spotlight (1920)
Ziegfeld Follies of 1921 (1921); music also by Rudolf Friml and others
Orange Blossoms (1922)
Ziegfeld Follies of 1923 (1923); music also by others
The Dream Girl (1924)
Gypsy Lady (1946); music adapted by Robert Wright, George Forrest

- Jerry Herman (1931–2019)

I Feel Wonderful (1954)
Nightcap (1958)
From A to Z (1960); music also by others
Parade (1960)
Milk and Honey (1961)
Madame Aphrodite (1961)
Ben Franklin in Paris (1964); music also by Mark Sandrich, Jr.
Hello, Dolly! (1964)
Mame (1966)
Dear World (1969)
Mack & Mabel (1974)
A Day in Hollywood / A Night in the Ukraine (1979); music also by Frank Lazarus, Trevor Lyttleton and others
The Grand Tour (1979)
La Cage Aux Folles (1983)
Jerry's Girls (1984)
Mrs. Santa Claus (film) (1996)
An Evening with Jerry Herman (1998)
Miss Spectacular (2002)
Showtune (2003)

- Keith Herrmann (b. 1952)

Onward Victoria (1980)
Romance/Romance (1987)
Prom Queens Unchained (1991)

- Jack Herrick

Lone Star Love (2004)

- Nigel Hess (b. 1953)

The Swan Down Gloves (1981)

- Hal Hester (1933–1992)

Your Own Thing (1968); music also by Danny Apolinar

- Mike Hickey

The Piemaker (2008)

- Joel Higgins (b. 1943)

Johnny Guitar (2004); music also by Martin Silvestri

- J. Leubrie Hill (1873–1916)

The Passing Show of 1915 (1915); music also by Leo Edwards, William Frederick Peters

- Richard Hill (b. 1942)

Canterbury Tales (1964); music also by John Hawkins

- Ulrich Hinterberg

Pascal – Ein Musikalisches Märchen, music also by Marcus Manske

- Robert Hipkins

Song of Singapore (1991); music also by Erik Frandsen, Michael Garin, Paula Lockheart

- Louis A. Hirsch (1887–1924)

He Came from Milwaukee (1910); music also by Ben Jerome
He Came from New York (1911)
The Revue of Revues (1911)
Vera Violetta (1911); music also by Edmund Eysler, George M. Cohan, Jean Schwartz
The Whirl of Society (1912)
The Passing Show of 1912 (1912)
Hullo, Ragtime! (1912)
Hullo, Tango! (1913)
Honeymoon Express (1914)
Dora's Doze (1914)
Ziegfeld Follies of 1915 (1915)
Ziegfeld Follies of 1916 (1916); music also by Jerome Kern, Dave Stamper
The Grass Widow (1917)
Going Up (1917)
The Rainbow Girl (1918)
Ziegfeld Follies of 1918 (1918)
Oh, My Dear! (1918)
See-Saw (1919)
Mary (1920)
The O'Brian Girl (1921)
The Greenwich Village Follies (1922)
Ziegfeld Follies of 1922 (1922); music also by Dave Stamper
The Greenwich Village Follies (1923)
Betty Lee (1924); music also by Con Conrad

- Joel Hirschhorn (1938–2005)

Copperfield (1981); music also by Al Kasha
Seven Brides for Seven Brothers (1982); music also by Gene de Paul, Al Kasha; also a 1954 film

- Naomi Caryl Hirshorn

Spoon River Anthology (1963)

- Jeff Hochhauser

Anne & Gilbert (2005); music also by Nancy White, Bob Johnston

- Larry Hochman (b. 1953)

One Man Band (1985)
Phantom of the Opera (1990)
Newport Newport

- Max Hoffman (1873–1963)

A Parisian Model (1906)

- Stephen Hoffman

Splendora (1995)

- Cary Hoffmann

What's a Nice Country Like You Doing in a State Like This? (1972)

- David Holcenberg

Bingo (2005); music also by Michael Heitzman, Ilene Reid

- Ray Holder (1925–2013)

Troubador (1978)

- Lee Holdridge (b. 1944)

Into the Light (1986)

- Mark Hollmann (b. 1963)

Urinetown (1999)

- Laurie Holloway (1938–2025)

Instant Marriage (1964)

- Roger Holman (b. 1948)

Smike (1973); music also by Simon May

- A.J. Holmes (b. 1988)

A Very Potter Musical (2009); music also by Darren Criss
Me and My Dick (2009); music also by Darren Criss, Carlos Valdes
A Very Potter Senior Year (2012); music also by Clark Baxtresser, Darren Criss, Pierce Siebers
Twisted: The Untold Story of a Royal Vizier (2013)

- Jack Holmes

From A to Z (1960); music also by others
O Say Can You See! (1962)
Buy Bonds, Buster! (1972)

- Rupert Holmes (b. 1947)

The Mystery of Edwin Drood (1985)

- Larry Holofcener (1926–2017)

Mr. Wonderful (1956); music also by Jerry Bock, George David Weiss

- Janet Hood

Elegies for Angels, Punks and Raging Queens (1989)

- Antony Hopkins (1921–2014)

Johnny the Priest (1960)

- Lance Horne

Back in the Day (2007)

- Bruce Hornsby (b. 1954)

SCKBSTD (2011)

- Jimmy Horowitz

Marlowe (1981)

- Karl Hoschna (1877–1911)

Belle of the West (1905)
The Daughter of the Desert (1905)
The Girl from Broadway (1907)
Prince Humbug (1908)
Three Twins (1908)
The Silver Star (1909)
Bright Eyes (1910)
Katy Did (1910)
Madame Sherry (1910)
Jumping Jupiter (1911)
Dr. Deluxe (1911)
The Girl of My Dreams (1911)
The Fascinating Widow (1911)
The Wall Street Girl (1912)

- Joseph E. Howard (1867–1961)

The District Leader (1906)
The Time, the Place and the Girl (1907)
The Land of Nod and The Song Birds (1907)
The Flower of the Ranch (1908)
The Girl Question (1908)
Stubborn Cinderella (1909)

- Ken Howard (1939–2024)

Mardi Gras (1976); music also by Alan Blaikley

- George Howe

Queen Lucia (2005)

- Jason Howland (b.1971)

Little Women (2004)

- John Raymond Hubbell (1879–1954)

Three Cheers (1928); music also by Ray Henderson, Leslie Sarony

- Adrian Huge

Shockheaded Peter (1998); music also by Martyn Jacques, Adrian Stout

- Gwyn Hughes

Bernadette (1990); music also by Maureen Hughes

- Maureen Hughes

Bernadette (1990); music also by Gwyn Hughes

- Franz Hummel (1939–2022)

Ludwig II: Sehnsucht nach dem Paradies (2000)

- Herman Hupfeld (1894–1951)

The Third Little Show (1931); music also by others
Americana (1932); music also by Jay Gorney, Harold Arlen, Richard Meyers

- Lawrence Hurwit

Sextet (1974)

- Lorne Huycke

The Wayward Way (1953)

== I ==
- Eric Idle (b. 1943)

Spamalot (2004); music also by John Du Prez

- Damon Intrabartolo (b. 1975)

Bare (2000)

- Markéta Irglová (b. 1988)

Once (2011); music also by Glen Hansard; also a 2006 film

- William C. K. "Will" Irwin (1907–1998)

Portofino (1958); music also by Louie Bellson
Earl Carroll's Sketch Book 1935 (1935); music also by others
Hey Nonny Nonny! (1932); music also by others

- Iskanada Ismail

Snow.Wolf.Lake (1997); music also by Guo Sai Cheung, Dick Lee, Lam Ming Yeung

- Aleksei Ivaschenko (b. 1958)

Nord-Ost (2001); music also by Georgii Vasilyev

== J ==
- Paul Jabara (1948–1992)

Rachael Lily Rosenbloom (And Don't You Ever Forget It) (1973)

- C. Bernard Jackson (1927–1996)

Fly Blackbird (1962); music also by James Hatch

- Bill Jacob

Jimmy (1969); music also by Patti Jacob

- Patti Jacob

Jimmy (1969); music also by Bill Jacob

- Jim Jacobs (b. 1942)

Grease (1972); music also by Warren Casey; also a 1978 film

- Paul Jacobs (b. 1950)

National Lampoon's Lemmings (1973); music also by Christopher Guest

- Harry Jacobson

Evangeline (1946); music also by George Posford

- Hy Jacobson (1895–1952)

Bagels and Yox (1951); music also by Sholom Secunda

- John Jacobson

A Matter of Opinion (1980); music also by Harold Danko

- Kenneth Jacobson (1930–2021)

Bottoms Up! (1949)
Hot September (1965)
Show Me Where the Good Times Are (1970)

- Martyn Jacques (b. 1959)

Shockheaded Peter (1998); music also by Adrian Huge, Adrian Stout

- Bob James (b. 1939)

The Selling of the President (1972)

- Byron Janis (1928–2024)

The Hunchback of Notre Dame (1993)

- Steve Jankowski

Francis (1981)

- Alaric Jans (b. 1949)

Do Black Patent Leather Shoes Really Reflect Up? (1982); music also by James Quinn

- Richard Jarboe

Hamelin: A Musical Tale from Rags to Riches (1985); music also by Harvey Shield

- Kyle Jarrow (b. 1979)

A Very Merry Unauthorized Children's Scientology Pageant (2003)
Hostage Song (2008)

- Karen Sokolof Javitch

Love! At the Cafe! (1996)
From Generation to Generation (1996)
Princess Diana, the Musical (1998)
Surprise! The Musical (2000)
Rachel and Ruthie (2009)

- Raymond Jeannot

La Révolution Française (1973); music also by Claude-Michel Schönberg

- Michael Jeffrey

The Meteoric Rise of Edmund Kean (1997)
Escape from Pterodactyl Island (1999)
The Rose and the Ring (2002)
High Hair and Jalapeños (2008)
The Postman and the Poet (2012)

- Gordon Jenkins (1910–1984)

Along Fifth Avenue (1949)

- John Jennings (1933–1988)

Riverwind (1962)

- Ben Jerome (1881–1938)

The Supper Club (1901); music also by others
The Darling of the Gallery Gods (1903)
The Dress Parade (1903)
The Isle of Spice (1904); music also by Paul Schindler
The Royal Chef (1904)
The Mimic World 1908 (1908); music also by Seymour Furth
Mr. Hamlet of Broadway (1908)
He Came from Milwaukee (1910); music also by Louis A. Hirsch
Yes, Yes, Yvette (1927); music also by Philip Charig

- Raymond Jessel (1929–2015)

Baker Street (1965); music also by Jerry Bock, Marian Grudeff

- Jimmy Jewell

NHS – The Musical (2006); music also by Nick Stimson

- Billy Joel (b. 1949)

Movin' Out (2002)

- Alan John (b. 1958)

Jonah Jones (1985)

- Elton John (b. 1947)

The Lion King (1997); music also by Hans Zimmer, Lebo M, Mark Mancina, Jay Rifkin
Aida (1998)
Billy Elliot (2005)
Lestat (2005)

- Zdeněk John

Rusalka (1998); musical after Antonín Dvořák's opera Rusalka

- Laurie Johnson (1927–2024)

Lock Up Your Daughters (1959)
Pieces of Eight (1959)
The Four Musketeers (1967)

- Ben Johnston (1926–2019)

Carmilla (1972)

- Bob Johnston (1932–2015)

Theda Barra and the Frontier Rabbi (1993)
Anne & Gilbert (2005); music also by Jeff Hochhauser, Nancy White
My Vaudeville Man! (2008)

- Tom Johnstone

Up in the Clouds (1922)
Molly Darling (1922)
Plain Jane (1924)
I'll Say She Is (1924)
When You Smile (1925)

- Arthur Jones

Buttrio Square (1952); music also by Fred Stamer

- Cliff Jones

Rockabye Hamlet (1976)

- Sidney Jones (1861–1946)

A Gaiety Girl (1893)
An Artist's Model (1895)
The Geisha (1896)
A Greek Slave (1898); music also by Lionel Monckton
San Toy (1899); music also by Lionel Monckton
My Lady Molly (1902)
The Medal and the Maid (1903)
See-See (1906)
King of Cadonia (1908); music also by Jerome Kern
A Persian Princess (1909)
The Girl from Utah (1914); music also by Paul Rubens, Jerome Kern and others
The Happy Day (1916); music also by Paul Rubens

- Stephen Jones (1880–1967)

Poppy (1923); music also by Arthur Samuels
Marjorie (1924); music also by Sigmund Romberg, Herbert Stothart, Philip Culkin
Captain Jinks (1925); music also by Lewis E. Gensler

- Scott Joplin (c.1867–1917)

The Tin Pan Alley Rag (2009); music also by Irving Berlin

- Louis Jordan (1908–1975)

Five Guys Named Moe (1990); music also by others

- Udo Jürgens (1934–2011)

Helden, Helden (1972)
Ich war noch niemals in New York (2007)

- Jimmy Justice

Sancocho (1979); music also by Ramiro Ramirez

== K ==
- Gabriel Kahane (b. 1981)

February House (2012)

- Roger Wolfe Kahn (1907–1962)

Here's Howe (1928); music also by Joseph Meyer
Americana (1928)

- Nanne Kalma

...van't Schip Batavia (1995)

- Emmerich Kálmán (1882–1953)

Her Soldier Boy (1916); music also by Sigmund Romberg
The Yankee Princess (1922)
Countess Maritza (1926)
Golden Dawn (1927); music also by Herbert Stothart
Marinka (1945)

- John Kander (b. 1927)

A Family Affair (1962)
Flora the Red Menace (1965)
Cabaret (1966); also a 1972 film
The Happy Time (1968)
Zorbá (1968)
70, Girls, 70 (1971)
Chicago (1975); also a 2002 film
The Act (1977)
Woman of the Year (1981)
The Rink (1984)
And the World Goes 'Round (1991)
Kiss of the Spider Woman (1992)
Steel Pier (1997)
All About Us (1999)
The Visit (2001)
Curtains (2006)
The Scottsboro Boys (2010)

- Bronisław Kaper (1902–1983)

Polonaise (1945)

- Robert Kapilow (b. 1952)

Green Eggs and Ham (1995)

- Jon and Al Kaplan (b. 1976 and 1978)

Silence! (2005)
24: Season Two (2008)

- Richard Kapp (1936–2006)

Teddy & Alice (1987); music also by John Philip Sousa

- Harold Karr (1921–1968)

Happy Hunting (1956)

- Al Kasha (1937–2020)

Copperfield (1981); music also by Joel Hirschhorn
Seven Brides for Seven Brothers (1982); music also by Gene de Paul, Joel Hirschhorn; also a 1954 film

- Hereward Kaye

Moby Dick (1992)

- Barry Keating

Starmites (1987)

- Keb' Mo' (b. 1951)

Thunder Knocking at the Door (2002); music also by Anderson Edwards

- Stephen Keeling (b. 1966)

Maddie (1997)
La Cava (2000); music also by Laurence O'Keefe
Heidi (2005)
Heidi and Johanna (2007)
My Father's Son

- Eliot Kennedy

Finding Neverland (2012); music also by Gary Barlow

- Skip Kennon

Herringbone (1982)
The Last Starfighter (2004)

- Walter Kent (1911–1994)

Seventeen (1951)

- Gustave Kerker (1857–1923)

The Belle of New York (1897)
The Man in the Moon (1899); music also by Ludwig Engländer, Reginald Dekoven

- Jerome Kern (1885–1945)

Mr. Wix of Wickham (1904); 1902 West End version with music by Herbert Darnley, George Everard
Fascinating Flora (1907); music mostly by others
The Dairymaids (1907); music mostly by others
Fluffy Ruffles (1908); music mostly by others
King of Cadonia (1908); music also by Sidney Jones
La Belle Paree (1911); music also by Frank E. Tours
The Kiss Waltz (1911); music mostly by others
The Girl from Montmartre (1912); music also by Henri Bereny
The Red Petticoat (1912)
The Doll Girl (1913); music mostly by Leo Fall
Oh, I Say! (1913)
The Laughing Husband (1914); music mostly by Edmund Eysler, Wimperis
The Girl from Utah (1914); music also by Paul Rubens, Sidney Jones and others
90 in the Shade (1915)
Nobody Home (1915)
Miss Information (1915)
Very Good Eddie (1915)
Ziegfeld Follies of 1916 (1916); music also by Dave Stamper, Louis Hirsch
Have a Heart (1917)
Love o' Mike (1917)
Theodore & Co (1917); music also by Ivor Novello
Oh, Boy! (1917); renamed Oh, Joy! for the London production (1919)
Leave It to Jane (1917)
Miss 1917 (1917); music also by Victor Herbert
Oh, Lady! Lady!! (1918)
Toot-Toot! (1918)
Rock-A-Bye Baby (1918)
Head Over Heels (1918)
She's a Good Fellow (1919)
The Night Boat (1920)
Hitchy-Koo of 1920 (1920)
Sally (1920); music also by Victor Herbert
Good Morning Dearie (1921)
The Bunch and Judy (1922)
The Cabaret Girl (1922)
Stepping Stones (1923)
Sitting Pretty (1924)
Dear Sir (1924)
Sunny (1925)
The City Chap (1925)
Criss-Cross (1926)
Lucky (1927); music mostly by Harry Ruby
Show Boat (1927); also 3 film versions (1929, 1936, 1951)
Sweet Adeline (1929)
The Cat and the Fiddle (1931)
Music in the Air (1932)
Roberta (1933)
Very Warm for May (1939)
Jerome Kern Goes to Hollywood (1985)
Never Gonna Dance (2003)

- Lee Kernaghan (b. 1964)

The Man from Snowy River (2002); music also by Bruce Rowland, Garth Porter

- Robert Kessler

O Marry Me! (1961)

- Bert Keyes (1930–1987)

But Never Jam Today (1979); music also by Bob Larimer

- Ayub Khan-Din (b. 1961)

Bunty Berman Presents... (2013); music also by Paul Bogaev

- Anthony King

Pull Both Ends (1972); music also by John Schroeder

- Anthony King (b. 1975)

Gutenberg! The Musical! (2005); music also by Scott Brown

- Carole King (b. 1942)

Really Rosie (1975)

- Denis King (b. 1939)

Privates on Parade (1977)
Worzel Gummidge (1981)
Bashville (1983)
Stepping Out (1997)
A Saint She Ain't (1999)
Awaking Beauty (2008)

- Scott Kingman

Gulp! (1976)

- Joe Kinosian

Murder for Two (2011)

- Wayne Kirkpatrick

Something Rotten! (2015)

- David Kirshenbaum

Summer of '42 (2001)
Party Come Here (2005)
Vanities (2005)

- Tom Kitt (b. 1974)

High Fidelity (2006)
From Up Here (2008)
Next to Normal (2008)
Bring It On (2011); music also by Lin-Manuel Miranda
If/Then (2013)
Freaky Friday (2016)
Dave (2018)

- Edward Kleban (1939–1987)

A Class Act (2000)

- Manuel Klein (1876–1919)

Mr. Pickwick (1903)
A Yankee Circus on Mars (1905), music also by Jean Schwartz

- Paul Klein

From A to Z (1960); music also by others
Morning Sun (1963)

- Randy Klein

It's Wilde! (1980)

- Barry Kleinbort

Big City Rhythm (1995)

- George Kleinsinger (1914–1982)

Archy and Mehitabel (1954)
Shinbone Alley (1957); 2nd version of Archy and Mehitabel

- Michael Knight

Exchange (1970); music also by Robert J. Lowery, Mike Brandt

- Brian Knowles (b. 1946)

Jane Eyre (1993)
The Government Inspector (2002)

- Leon Ko (b. 1973)

Heading East (1999)
The Good Person of Szechwan (2003)
Perhaps Love (2005)
The Legend of the White Snake (2006)
Angel Falls (2007)
Field of Dreams (2008)

- Ted Kociolek

Abyssinia (1987)

- Walter Kollo (1878–1940)

Springtime of Youth (1922); music also by Sigmund Romberg
Paris (1928); music also by Cole Porter, Harry Warren, Louis Alter, Fred E. Ahlert

- Joseph M. Kookolis

Soon (1971); music also by Scott Fagan

- David Krane

Aspire (2005)
The Road to Qatar! (2011)

- Fritz Kreisler (1875–1962)

Rhapsody (1944)

- Henry Krieger (b. 1945)

Dreamgirls (1981); also a 2006 film
The Tap Dance Kid (1983)
Side Show (1997)
Love's Fowl (1998)
Everything's Ducky (2000)
Kept (2002)

- Edward Künneke (1885–1953)

The Love Song (1925)
Mayflowers (1925)

- Jay Kuo (b. 1968)

Upwardly Mobile (1989)
Insignificant Others (2006)
Worlds Apart (2006)
Allegiance (2012)

- Gary Kupper

Freckleface Strawberry (2011)

- Fela Kuti (1938–1997)

Fela! (2008)

== L ==
- Michael John LaChiusa (b. 1962)

Buzzsaw Berkeley (1989)
Hello Again (1993)
First Lady Suite (1993)
The Petrified Prince (1994)
Marie Christine (1999)
The Wild Party (2000)
Little Fish (2003)
See What I Wanna See (2005)
Bernarda Alba (2006)
Giant (2009)
Queen of the Mist (2011)

- Ladysmith Black Mambazo

The Song of Jacob Zulu (1993)

- Marvin Laird (1939–2024)

Ruthless! (1992)

- Lisa Lambert (b. 1962)

The Drowsy Chaperone (2006); music also by Greg Morrison

- Scott Lamps

Holy Musical B@man! (2012); music also by Nick Gage

- Daniel Landa (b. 1968)

Krysař (1996); also a 1985 animated film

- Burton Lane (1912–1997)

Earl Carroll's Vanities of 1931 (1931); music also by others
Hold On to Your Hats (1940)
Laffing Room Only (1944)
Finian's Rainbow (1947)
On a Clear Day You Can See Forever (1965); also a 1970 film
Carmelina (1979)

- Paul Lannin

Two Little Girls in Blue (1921); music also by Vincent Youmans
For Goodness Sake (1922); music also by William Daly
A la Carte (1927); music also by others

- Alain Lanty (b. 1961)

Les mille et une vies d'Ali Baba (2000); music also by Fabrice Aboulker

- Bob Larimer

King of the Whole Damn World! (1962)
But Never Jam Today (1979); music also by Bert Keyes

- Jonathan Larson (1960–1996)

Rent (1996); also a 2005 film
tick, tick... BOOM! (2001)

- Peter Larson

Brownstone (1979)

- Brian Lasser

A Bundle of Nerves (1983)

- Cyndi Lauper (b. 1953)

Kinky Boots (2012)

- Jack Lawrence (1912–2009)

Courtin' Time (1951); music also by Don Walker
I Had a Ball (1964); music also by Stan Freeman

- Maury Laws (1923–2019)

A Month of Sundays (1968)

- Roger Lax

Weekend (1983)

- Frank Lazarus (1939–2025)

A Day in Hollywood / A Night in the Ukraine (1979); music also by Jerry Herman, Trevor Lyttleton, and others

- Mike Leander (1941–1996)

Matador (1991)

- Stanley Lebowsky (1926–1986)

Gantry (1970)

- Janek Ledecký (b. 1962)

Hamlet (2000)
Galileo (2003)
Vánoční zázrak aneb Sliby se maj plnit o Vánocích (The Christmas Miracle) (2011)

- David Lee (b. 1926)

New Cranks (1960)
Our Man Crichton (1964)

- Dick Lee (b. 1956)

Beauty World (1994)
Fried Rice Paradise (1991)
Nagraland (1992)
Kampong Amber (1994)
Sing to the Dawn (1996)
A Twist of Fate (1997)
Snow.Wolf.Lake (1997); music also by Guo Sai Cheung, Iskanada Ismail, Lam Ming Yeung
Phua Chu Kang (2000)
Forbidden City: Portrait of an Empress (2002)
Puteri Gunung Ledang (2006)

- Lester Lee (1903–1956)

New Priorities of 1943 (1942)
All for Love (1949); music also by Allan Roberts

- Stewart Lee (b. 1968)

Jerry Springer: The Opera (2003); music also by Richard Thomas

- Michel Legrand (1932–2019)

Brainchild (1974)
Les Parapluies de Cherbourg (1979)
Amour (2002)
Les Demoiselles de Rochefort (2003)
Marguerite (2008)

- Franz Lehár (1870–1948)

The Merry Widow (1905)

- Tom Lehrer (b. 1928)

Tom Foolery (1980)

- Jerry Leiber (1933–2011)

Smokey Joe's Cafe (1995); music also by Mike Stoller

- Mitch Leigh (1928–2014)

Man of La Mancha (1965); also a 1972 film
Chu Chem (1966)
Cry for Us All (1970)
Home Sweet Homer (1976)
Saravá (1979)
Ain't Broadway Grand (1993)

- Walter Leigh (1905–1942)

Victoria Regina (1935)
Nine Sharp (1938)
The Little Revue (1939)

- John Lennon (1940–1980)

Beatlemania (1977); music also by Paul McCartney
Norwegian Wood (1988); music also by Paul McCartney
Looking through a Glass Onion (1993)
Lennon (2005)

- Michael Leonard

The Yearling (1965)

- Ray Leslee

Standup Shakespeare (1987)
Avenue X (1994)

- Kenneth Leslie-Smith (1897–1993)

Bet Your Life (1952); music also by Charles Zwar

- George Lessner (1904–1997)

Sleepy Hollow (1948)

- Sonny Lester (1924–2018)

This Was Burlesque (1965); music also by Bill Grundy

- Sylvester Levay (b. 1945)

Elizabeth (1992)
Mozart! (1999)
Rebecca (2006)
Marie Antoinette (2006)

- Daniel Levine

Anna Karenina (1992)

- Ilya Levinson

If I Embarrass You, Tell Your Friends (2008)

- David Levy

Hey Ma...Kaye Ballard (1984); music also by Leslie Eberhard
The Wonder Years (1988)

- Shuki Levy (b. 1947)

Imagine This (2007)

- Gene Lewin

Striking 12 (2006); music also by Brendan Milburn, Valerie Vigoda

- Richard Lewine (1910–2005)

Make Mine Manhattan (1948)
The Girls Against the Boys (1959); music also by Albert Hague

- Henry Lewis

Joan of Kent (1989)
Please Sir, How Do I Write a Hit Musical? (1992)

- Michael J. Lewis (b. 1939)

Cyrano (1973)
Voyeurz (1996); music also by Peter Rafelson

- Morgan Lewis (1906–1968)

New Faces of 1934 (1934); music also by others
One For the Money (1939)
Two for the Show (1940)
Three to Make Ready (1946)

- Conor Linehan

Little Wolf's Book of Badness (2007)

- Peter Link (b. 1944)

Salvation (1969); music also by C.C. Courtney
Earl of Ruston (1971)
King of Hearts (1978)
The River (1988)
Sundown (2002)

- Andrew Lippa (b. 1964)

john & jen (1995)
The Wild Party (2000)
A Little Princess (2004)
The Addams Family (2009)
Big Fish (2013)

- Sidney Lippman (1914–2003)

Barefoot Boy with Cheek (1947)

- Jay Livingston (1915–2001)

Aaron Slick from Punkin Crick (1952); music also by Ray Evans
Oh, Captain! (1958); music also by Ray Evans
Let It Ride (1961); music also by Ray Evans

- Jerry Livingston (1909–1987)

Bright Lights of 1944 (1943)
Jack and the Beanstalk (1956)
Molly (1973)

- Andrew Lloyd Webber (b. 1948)

The Likes of Us (1965)
Jesus Christ Superstar (1971)
Joseph and the Amazing Technicolor Dreamcoat (1972)
By Jeeves (1975)
Evita (1978)
Tell Me on a Sunday (1979)
Cats (1981)
Song and Dance (1982)
Starlight Express (1984)
Phantom of the Opera (1986)
Aspects of Love (1989)
Sunset Boulevard (1992)
Whistle Down the Wind (1996)
The Beautiful Game (2000)
The Woman in White (2004)
Love Never Dies (2010)
The Wizard of Oz (2011); music also by Harold Arlen
Stephen Ward (2013)
School of Rock (2015)
Cinderella (2021)

- Paula Lockheart

Song of Singapore (1991); music also by Erik Frandsen, Michael Garin, Robert Hipkins

- John Jacob Loeb (1910–1970)

Arabian Nights (1954); music also by Carmen Lombardo

- Frank Loesser (1910–1969)

The Illustrators' Show (1936)
Where's Charley? (1948)
Guys and Dolls (1950); also a 1955 film
The Most Happy Fella (1956)
Greenwillow (1960)
How to Succeed in Business Without Really Trying (1961); also a 1967 film
Pleasures and Palaces (1965)
Perfectly Frank (1980); music also by others

- Frederick Loewe (1901–1988)

Great Lady (1938)
Life of the Party (1942)
What's Up? (1943)
The Day Before Spring (1945)
Brigadoon (1947); also a 1954 film
Paint Your Wagon (1951); also a 1969 film
My Fair Lady (1956); also a 1964 film
Camelot (1960); also a 1967 film
Gigi (1973); also a 1958 film
The Little Prince (1974 film)

- Carmen Lombardo (1903–1971)

Arabian Nights (1954); music also by John Jacob Loeb

- Kenn Long

Touch (1970); music also by Jim Crozier

- Robert Lopez (b. 1975)

Avenue Q (2003); music also by Jeff Marx
The Book of Mormon (2011); music also by Trey Parker and Matt Stone

- Brent Lord

Go-Go Beach (2006); music also by Michael Shaieb

- Graham Losee

Giant Killer Shark: The Musical (2006); music also by Sam Sutherland, Aaron Zorgel

- Natalie Lovejoy

Deployed (2013)

- Alex Loveless

The Remains of the Day (2010)

- Ken Low

Chang & Eng (1997)

- Chris Lowe (b. 1959) (member of Pet Shop Boys)

Closer to Heaven (2001); music also by Neil Tennant

- Robert J. Lowery

Exchange (1970); music also by Michael Knight, Mike Brandt

- Harry Lubin (1906–1977)

The Singing Rabbi (1931); music also by Joseph Rumshinsky

- Jeffery Lunden

Wings (1992)

- Steven Lutvak (1959–2023)

A Gentleman's Guide to Love and Murder (2012)

- Kevin Lynch

Rush! (1998)

- Phyllis Lynd

I Love You, Madam President (1994)

- Jeff Lynne (b. 1947)

Xanadu (2007); music also by John Farrar

- Ron Lytle

Oh My Godmother! (2005)
The Man Who Saved Christmas (2006)

- Trevor Lyttleton

A Day in Hollywood / A Night in the Ukraine (1979); music also by Frank Lazarus, Jerry Herman, and others

== See also ==
- List of musical theatre composers
- Lists of musicals
