= Daisy Ba-ad =

Filipino writer

Daisy B. Ba-ad is a playwright, stage director, composer, motivational speaker and life coach based in Cebu City, Philippines. She is a Masscom graduate of St. Theresa's College, Cebu City given a special award for Outstanding Performance in Theater Arts. Trained under professional directors Laurice Guillen, Gina Alajar, Leo Martinez and New York acting coach Eric Morris, she is currently artistic and training director of Out of the Box Training and Productions. She also designed and mentored the Photographic/Commercial Modeling program of Fashion TV Model School based in the city.

== Works ==
Her most popular original Cebuano musical entitled Tall Tales Kuno!, grant awardee of the National Commission for Culture and the Arts (Philippines) under their program for Artistic Excellence, has been staged by various organizations in Cebu. Her most recent directorial work is an original musical in English written by Jude Gitamondoc entitled Siddhartha: A Musical Journey to Enlightenment produced by Buddha's Light International Association - Cebu Chapter. Its successful run at the Waterfront Pacific Ballroom, on June 6, 2007, and at the main theater of the Cultural Center of the Philippines, on November 3 and 4, 2007, has paved the way for the production to be brought to Taiwan touring the cities of Taipei and Kaoshiung. Plans are underway for the Siddhartha musical to be toured in Europe, the US, Australia and Beijing China.

Her latest directorial job was Zephryin Namuncura: The Musical, written by Jude Gitamondoc, for Don Bosco Cebu in celebration of the beatification of Ceferino Namuncura. Ba-ad is also known to have successfully used theater games in training programs she has designed for corporate groups. Her clients include Aboitiz Group of Companies, Arts Council of Cebu, Ayala Land, ABS-CBN Television Cebu, Cebu Holdings Inc., and Jollibee Foods Corp.

== Background ==
Daisy Ba-ad was born in Cebu City, Philippines on March 31, 1961, and is the second to the youngest in a family of nine. Her parents Melda and Domingo Ba-ad already saw the potential in her as a child. She was dubbed as the entertainer of the family at the age of four because of her ability to dance and sing upon request.

Her first exposure to theater began in kindergarten where she played support and lead roles. Her high school days were focused on developing her skills in oration, declamation, acting, singing and song composition. She was awarded a Department Medal upon graduation.

As a freshman in college taking up Mass Communications, she was voted to direct the freshman's entry to the school's Drama Festival with Wilfrido Ma. Guerrero’s Wanted: Chaperon. They won five out of six awards including best director and best production - a first in the school's history that the freshman year would win over higher years and winning most of the awards at the same time.

Daisy became more active in college as she moved on to writing poetry and short skits for class or for official school activities and directed them. She became known as the Barbra Streisand of the school with her lip synchronization acts of Streisand's Minute Waltz, I'm Five, Jingle Bells and the like.

She also won declamation and songwriting competitions during her college days. In fact, for two successive years, she brought home the grand prize for the English and Tagalog categories of the Declamation Contest included in Inter-School Annual Literary-Musical Festival in the city. She was later given a scholarship to the Philippine Educational Theater Association's (PETA) Integrated Arts Workshop in Manila. She was also offered to be the moderator of the high school drama club while in her sophomore year in college. This event gave her the opportunity to start designing training modules and writing full length plays.

She was the chair of STC Bantawan theater group all throughout college and popularized the "dula-tula" form of Philippine theater in Cebu City.

== Noted directorial works ==
- SIDDHARTHA, A Musical Journey to Enlightenment
- ZEPHRYIN, The Musical
- AYALA CEBU HOLDINGS INC., Kick Off Corporate Rally
- THE GODSPELL TAKES, Musical Culminating Activity
- THE WIZ REVUE, Musical Culminating Activity
- DREAMS, Broadway Excerpts
- KADAUGAN SA MACTAN: The Reenactment, A Festival Presentation
- EVERAFTER, Culminating Activity
- THE WORLD IS A STAGE, Culminating Activity
- CIRQUE DU CEBU, Cebu X Awards Night
- THE FIRST MANTAWI FESTIVAL
- THE VAGINA MONOLOGUES with Monique Wilson^{[usurped]} (2002 & 2004)
- GOD IN MOTION, A Musical Celebrating the 50TH Year of the Salesian Community
- MAN OF LA MANCHA - Entry to the Festival of the Arts of the Arts Council of Cebu
- FESTIVAL OF THE ARTS LAUNCHING, Arts Council of Cebu Foundation Inc.
- SAN CARLOS: THE MUSICALE
- TALL TALES!, A Daisy Ba-ad Original Musical
- COMING HOME, A Musical Play
- SHAKESPEAREAN RHAPSODY, Center for Intl. Education
- PANAW SA KAGAHAPON, LIVE DIORAMA, Cebu Holdings Inc. & Ayala Center Cebu
- THE KING & I, Toastmasters Cebu
- BINHI SA STO. NINO, DANCE DRAMA, Cebu Holdings Inc. & Ayala Center Cebu
- FIDDLER ON THE ROOF, Toastmasters Cebu
- LES MISERABLES Concert
- LEON KILAT, A Musical Cebuano Play
- SA MALIPAT LANG, a Cebuano adaptation of The Fantasticks
