= Not Wanted on the Voyage =

Book by Timothy Findley

- First edition cover
- Author: Timothy Findley
- Publisher: Delacorte Press
- Publication date: September 6, 1985

Not Wanted on the Voyage is a novel by Canadian author Timothy Findley, which presents a magic realist post-modern re-telling of the Great Flood in the biblical Book of Genesis. It was first published by Viking Canada in the autumn of 1984, and was a shortlisted finalist for the Governor General's Award for English-language fiction at the 1984 Governor General's Awards.

== Plot summary ==
The story centres around Dr. Noah Noyes, an authoritarian doctor and father whose obsession with God's law leads him to neglect his family; his wife, Mrs. Noyes, an alcoholic who talks to animals; and Mottyl, Mrs. Noyes's blind cat. Noah and Mrs. Noyes have three sons, Shem, Japeth, and Ham. Shem is married to Hannah, who spends a great deal of time with Dr. Noyes. Japeth is married to Emma, a young girl of about 11, who refuses to consummate their marriage.

One day, an exhausted Yaweh visits Dr. Noyes. Yaweh is depressed to the point of wilfully allowing himself to die due to the treatment he has received from humanity. He tells Noyes that the people of the City threw offal, rotten fruit, and feces at his carriage and have assassinated him seven times. Yaweh remains depressed until he is inspired by a magic show Noah puts on to raise his spirits. Noah puts a penny under a glass bottle then fills the bottle with water. Due to refraction of the penny's image, the coin appears to vanish, but Yaweh becomes obsessed with the idea that the application of water can make things disappear.

Soon Yaweh tells Noah to build an ark in preparation for the flood. Noah is resolutely obedient, but some in his family react negatively. Ham quickly marries Lucy, a mysterious seven-foot-tall woman with webbed fingers (a trait found only in angels, according to the novel) who is eventually revealed to be Lucifer in female form. As Yaweh leaves, Mottyl hears flies buzzing from within Yaweh's carriage and knows that Yaweh has resigned himself to death.

Noah is adamant that Yaweh's edict must be followed to the letter and insists that there must be only two of every animal. Mrs. Noyes tries to bring Mottyl, who Noah has decreed must stay behind since he's chosen Yaweh's own two pet cats to represent felines on the ark. Noah sets fire to the house and barn, with Mottyl inside, offering all their additional animals as a giant sacrifice to Yaweh. Mrs. Noyes is enraged at the attempt to kill her cat and by the carnage in what is left of her home, and refuses to board the ark. Noah is concerned that if Mrs. Noyes does not come, the ark and its passengers will be doomed, as Yaweh's edict clearly states that Noah's wife must be aboard. Mrs. Noyes hides in Noah's orchard as the rain starts, but leaves when she notices Emma's sister Lotte, a "monkey child," trying to cross the river. Mrs. Noyes rescues Lotte and agrees to board only if Lotte can also come. Noah agrees to let Lotte on board, but has Japeth kill her shortly after. Mrs. Noyes again rebels, but ultimately agrees to board the ark and smuggles Mottyl aboard, hidden in her apron.

As the voyage begins Noah quickly imposes his will on his family by drawing a line between the "rebellious" elements (Mrs. Noyes, Emma, Ham, and Lucy) and the rest (himself, Hannah, Japeth, and Shem). One day, dolphins swim by the ark, attempting to befriend the inhabitants. Noah decides that the dolphins must be pirates and has Japeth slaughter them. Mrs. Noyes attempts to stop him, and once the "pirates" have been defeated, Noah locks Mrs. Noyes, Lucy, Ham, and Emma in the lower levels of the ark, forcing them to care for the animals alone. Meanwhile, Noah, Hannah, Shem, and Japeth enjoy quarters on the deck of the ark and freedom from heavy chores.

Noah notices that Japeth is becoming more preoccupied with sex and often eyes Hannah in a way that makes Noah wary. He decides that the solution is to force Emma to consummate their marriage. Noah has Emma brought to the deck and "inspects" her to see what the problem is. He decides that Emma's "tightness" is the reason why Japeth could not "gain entry" and requests that the Unicorn is brought to aid the problem. Noah uses the Unicorn to "open" Emma for Japeth, a process which traumatizes Emma and severely injures the Unicorn. When Japeth finds out what his father has done, he cuts off the Unicorn's horn. Emma is then forced to live on the top deck to be near her husband.

Mrs. Noyes, Lucy, and Ham decide to rebel against Noah and the others. They formulate a plan to burn through the locked door using the two demons on board. They get the door open and plan to close the armoury, where Japeth sleeps, from the outside so as to neutralize Japeth. Unfortunately, Japeth is patrolling the deck and captures the escapees. He ties up Mrs. Noyes, Lucy, and Ham and throws the demons overboard, which enrages Lucy. She breaks free of her bonds and curses Japeth so that his wounds will never heal properly and he will always smell of the violence he has inflicted on others. Mrs. Noyes, Ham, and Lucy are locked below again, this time with boards and chains locking the door from the outside.

Lucy plans another escape and has Crowe take a message to Emma to release them. Emma removes all the chains and bars while Noah and Hannah are preoccupied with praying, Shem is preoccupied with eating, and Japeth is preoccupied dressing his wounds. Mrs. Noyes, Lucy, and Ham bar the armoury and the chapel, locking in Noah, Hannah, and Japeth, but they are unable to find Shem.

While locked in the chapel, Hannah's labour begins. She asks Noah to call for help, but he refuses to call for anyone until the baby is born. Noah knows that the baby is likely his and is worried that it will be a "monkey child" like Lotte, as Japeth's dead twin brother was also monkey-like. When the baby is born dead it is indeed revealed to be a "monkey child". Ham, hearing Hannah's cries of pain, opens the chapel door to help Hannah. He is quickly brained by Shem, but not before he sees Hannah's child. Hannah wraps it in blankets to hide its hairy arms and throws the baby overboard.

A truce between the factions is tacitly called. The weather is sunny for the first time since the start of the rain, and Noah asks Emma to send a dove to look for land. When the dove does not return, they continue to send birds until Noah decides to send his own trained dove. Noah's dove returns with an olive branch, which Noah uses to prove Yaweh's edict. The other members of the ark remain unconvinced, as they know it is the same branch from the dove's cage. The novel ends with Mrs. Noyes sitting on deck with Mottyl, praying to the clouds for rain.

== Characters ==
- Dr. Noah Noyes – The tyrannical patriarch who is also Yaweh's best friend and confidant. It is believed that he is the one that encouraged Yaweh to cause the flood and destroy the human race through his magic trick. Noah is unwavering in his faith and domination of his family, often ignoring empirical evidence in favor of deeming something a "miracle". He loses his humanity completely over the course of the novel and his only aim is to obey the edict of Yahweh.
- Mrs. Noyes – The gin-drinking, piano-playing, subservient wife of Noah. As the book progresses she becomes more rebellious towards Noah's decrees. Mrs. Noyes has a strong affinity with animals, especially her cat, Mottyl but also with her sheep, Crowe and others. She even goes into a bear's cage to comfort it during a thunderstorm. Over the course of the novel she ceases to believe in prayer to Yahweh, preferring that the creatures of the Earth pray to each other and to the sky and the water.
- Yaweh – Old and irritable, Yaweh is angered and depressed at the state of humanity and seeks out Noah for hospitality. His depression results in the destruction of the world and Yaweh's own acceptance of death.
- Michael Archangelis – An Angel and Yaweh's bodyguard. He is Lucy's brother and ultimately her nemesis. He does not feel she has been satisfactorily defeated since she chose to leave heaven rather than being forced out.
- Japeth Noyes – The Noyes' youngest son. Sex deprived and stained blue from a traumatizing encounter with outcast ruffians while on his journey to the City, Japeth turns to violence as a way of overcoming his experience. There are suggestions that he was once a loving and trusting person but he has since become a symbol of violent death in the minds of those below deck.
- Ham Noyes – The Noyes' middle son, intellectual and enthusiastic about nature and science, he is unlike the rest of the Noyes family.
- Shem Noyes – The Noyes' eldest son, also known as the Ox, for his physical strength and dearth of thought.
- Hannah – The pregnant wife of Shem, who finds favor with both Noah and Yaweh due to her willingness to serve. Hannah is perceived as cold by the rest of the family. In the end, it is revealed that Noah was the one who got her pregnant, rather than Shem.
- Lucy – The seven-foot tall geisha who mysteriously appears in the forest and became Ham's wife. She is secretly a male, fallen angel who disguised himself as a woman to save himself from the flood. Unlike traditional stories of Lucifer's fall, Lucy is said to have fallen for simply asking, "why?" She is the instigator of a similar rebellion on board the ship.
- Emma – The young and reluctant wife of Japeth. Emma did not want to be his wife but had no choice in the matter. She and Mrs. Noyes had their differences but become allies in the end.
- Lotte – Emma's sister, an "ape-child". Has a "mental disability".
- Mottyl – Mrs. Noyes' loving blind calico cat, who was unfortunately the subject of many of Doctor Noyes' experiments. Mottyl undergoes an impressive degree of suffering in the novel. She is in heat at the beginning, gets pregnant and is thereby forced to raise her babies aboard ship where food is scarce, conditions are cramped and dirty and discovery would mean death since there are only supposed to be two cats aboard the ark. She learns to rely on her hearing and smell. Despite this she is a very compassionate animal. Her greatest fear is Dr. Noyes and later Japeth.
- Crowe – a female crow who is Mottyl's best friend and later savior.
- Sarah and Abraham – Yaweh's cats, who are chosen as the two cats to board the ark. Abraham was responsible for impregnating Mottyl.

== Stage adaptations ==
Not Wanted on the Voyage has been adapted for the stage on at least two occasions.

Canadian playwrights D. D. Kugler and Richard Rose wrote a dramatic adaptation of Not Wanted on the Voyage. The play premiered at the Manitoba Theatre Centre in 1992 as a co-production with Necessary Angel Theatre Company and Canadian Stage Company.

Canadian duo Neil Bartram and Brian Hill adapted Not Wanted on the Voyage as a musical. The musical received a developmental staging in 2010 at Northwestern University's Ethel M. Barber Theater as part of the American Music Theatre Project. The production at Northwestern was directed by Amanda Dehnert and featured a cast of primarily Northwestern theatre students. The creative team included several Broadway veterans, such as music director David Holcenberg, choreographer Maija Garcia, and scenic designer Eugene Lee. Bartram and Hill's adaptation was then featured at Goodspeed Musicals' 2012 New Works Festival.

== Canada Reads ==
The novel was selected for inclusion in the 2008 edition of Canada Reads, where it was championed by actor Zaib Shaikh.

== Foreign adaptations ==
In French, Not Wanted on the Voyage is called Passagers clandestins and was published in 2008 by Actes Sud.
