= List of composers of musicals =

This is a list of notable composers of musicals.

See also List of musicals by composer

== A–B ==
- Richard Adler
- Harry Akst
- Lynn Ahrens
- Jerome Alden
- Leroy Anderson
- Benny Andersson
- Harold Arlen
- Nat D. Ayer
- Burt Bacharach
- Sara Bareilles
- Gary Barlow
- Edward Barnes
- Lionel Bart
- George Bassman
- Irving Berlin
- Elmer Bernstein
- Leonard Bernstein
- Eva Best
- Eubie Blake
- Marc Blitzstein
- Jeff Blumenkrantz
- Jerry Bock
- John Walter Bratton
- Leslie Bricusse
- Mel Brooks
- Jason Robert Brown
- Lew Brown
- David Bryan

== C–D ==
- F. Osmond Carr
- Ivan Caryll
- Alfred Cellier
- Moose Charlap
- Petula Clark
- Pippa Cleary
- George M Cohan
- Cy Coleman
- Noël Coward
- Roberto Danova
- Joel Derfner
- Robert E. Dolan
- Ervin Drake
- Vernon Duke

== E–F ==
- Gus Edwards
- Danny Elfman
- William Finn
- Stephen Flaherty
- Scott Frankel
- Harold Fraser-Simson
- Gary William Friedman
- Rudolf Friml

== G-H ==
- Noel Gay
- George Gershwin
- Zina Goldrich
- Jonathan Goldstein (composer)
- Howard Goodall
- Ricky Ian Gordon
- Micki Grant
- Adam Guettel
- Hal Hackady
- Herbert Haines
- Marvin Hamlisch
- E.Y. Harburg
- Edward W. Hardy
- Edward Harrigan
- Tony Hatch
- Jerry Herman
- Victor Herbert
- Louis Hirsch
- Mark Hollmann
- Rupert Holmes

== I–J ==
- Isaac Albéniz
- Elton John
- Sidney Jones

== K–L ==
- John Kander
- Yakov Kazyansky
- Gustave Kerker
- Jerome Kern
- Edward Kleban
- Michael John LaChiusa
- Burton Lane
- Kirke La Shelle
- Jonathan Larson
- Liza Lehmann
- Cyndi Lauper
- Carolyn Leigh
- Mitch Leigh
- Sylvester Levay
- Andrew Lippa
- Andrew Lloyd Webber
- Frank Loesser
- Frederick Loewe
- Robert Lopez
- Bree Lowdermilk
- Meyer Lutz
- Steven Lutvak

== M–N ==
- Galt MacDermot
- Mesias Maiguashca
- Dave Malloy
- Alexandar Methinda
- Daniel Mallistha
- Jeff Marx
- John Marx
- Frederic Norton
- Alan Menken
- Johnny Mercer
- Roger Miller
- Francis Milton
- Sam Mills
- Tim Minchin
- Tom Michelle
- Lin-Manuel Miranda
- Alyssa Burns
- Frederic Norton
- Lionel Monckton
- Ryan Moona
- Marguerite Monnot
- Jerome Moross
- Clarence Wainwright Murphy
- Misa O'Neil
- Wolfgang Mozart
- Pepe Neil
- Gerd Natschinski
- Anthony Newley
- Frederic Norton
- Dozie Nwigwe
- Donna Nancy
- Ivor Novello

== O–P ==
- Richard O'Brien
- Laurence O'Keefe
- Ryan Scott Oliver
- Clifton Parker
- Trey Parker
- Pasek and Paul
- William Perry
- Robert Planquette
- Cole Porter
- Jacques Presburg
- André Previn
- Jonathan Price

== R ==
- Arturo Rodas
- Mary Rodgers
- Richard Rodgers
- Sigmund Romberg
- Harold Rome
- Jerry Ross
- Dana P. Rowe
- Paul Rubens
- Willy Russell

== S ==
- Luis H. Salgado
- Harvey Schmidt
- Arthur Schwartz
- Stephen Schwartz
- Claude-Michel Schönberg
- Marc Schubring
- Al Sherman
- Robert B. Sherman
- Richard M. Sherman
- Robert J. Sherman
- Matthew Sklar
- Ted Snyder
- Julian Slade
- Walter Slaughter
- Charlie Smalls
- Edward Solomon
- Stephen Sondheim
- John Philip Sousa
- George Stansbury
- Matt Stone
- Oscar Straus
- Charles Strouse
- Leslie Stuart
- Jule Styne

== T–Y ==
- Howard Talbot
- James W. Tate
- Jeanine Tesori
- Harry Tierney
- Pyotr Ilyich Tchaikovsky
- Pete Townshend
- Björn Ulvaeus
- James Valcq
- Jimmy Van Heusen
- Julian Wagstaff
- John Wallowitch
- Harry Warren
- Kurt Weill
- Richard A. Whiting
- Frank Wildhorn
- Meredith Willson
- Sandy Wilson
- Robert Wright
- Laurence Mark Wythe
- David Yazbek
- Maury Yeston
- Vincent Youmans
