= Cecil Broadhurst =

Canadian artist, songwriter, actor and playwrighter (1908–1981)

Cecil Arthur Broadhurst (May 8, 1908 - December 16, 1981) was a Canadian artist, songwriter, actor and playwright, who had a passionate interest in and love for all things Western. At age 15 he began his lifelong commitment to painting, studying under LeMoine Fitzgerald and Frank Franz Johnston A.R.C.A. members of Canada's renowned Group of Seven (artists). In 1932 he launched out on his own, but the Great Depression in the 1930s led him to other fields: among them flying as a Bush pilot, radio and theatre, followed by college and a year at the Detroit Art Academy. A Canadian producer asked him to paint a stage set for him, which prompted Broadhurst, a relative of George Broadhurst, New York theatrical producer and founder of New York's famed Broadhurst Theatre, to focus his talents on the theatre and his gift for songwriting. He subsequently wrote over a hundred cowboy songs, including "There'll be a New World Beginning from Tonight" which became an annual fixture as the rousing finale of the hugely popular Christmas concerts of Malcolm Sargent at London's Royal Albert Hall. In 1940 he appeared singing one of his cowboy songs in the movie Susan and God starring Joan Crawford.

He put his creative talents at the service of the Moral Re-Armament movement (MRA) (now known as 'Initiatives of Change ). In 1951 he wrote and co-starred in the Broadway Production of his musical Jotham Valley (http://www.ibdb.com/production.asp?ID=391960). The work was filmed in 1952 in England with at least one member of the Broadway cast. Another of his plays, The Cowboy Christmas was produced in many countries, often as part of MRA campaigns. He returned to painting full-time in the 1960s and quickly established a reputation as one of the West's finest artists at his studio in Arivaca, Arizona. His paintings are in galleries and private collections coast to coast as well as Europe and South America.

He said: "Some say the Cowboy is a vanishing species, but in my book he'll be around as long as the paint stays on the canvas".
