= Gordon Clyde =

British TV presenter and artist

- Born: Gordon David McCallum Clyde; 22 May 1933
- Died: 26 January 2008 (aged 74)
- Education: Christ's College, Cambridge, United Kingdom
- Occupations: Actor; TV presenter; writer; musician

Gordon David McCallum Clyde (22 May 1933 – 26 January 2008) was a British television actor, television presenter, writer and musician.

== Biography ==
Clyde was born in 1933 and was educated at Highgate School from 1945 and Christ's College, Cambridge from 1951, where he studied English and music. He is mainly known from the Dick Emery show. At the start of each episode he appeared as the interviewer, interviewing various characters played by Emery, with responses such as "Ooh you are awful, but I like you". Clyde was also a regular presenter on the BBC children's programme Play School (UK TV series) during the late 1960s.

He appeared with Morecambe and Wise.

He wrote the music for Kisses on a Postcard.

He presented the classical music request programme "The Pleasure's Yours" on the BBC World Service radio.

Gordon was a skilled pool player and often visited the private club "The 43" in Streatham, where he enjoyed having a pint while keeping a relatively low profile. He was known as a private person and a good friend. The club closed around 1987 or 1988 after sustaining severe damage during the Great Storm of 1987.
