= Oil City Symphony =

Musical by various composers

- Poster for the 1987 off-Broadway production
- Music: Various
- Lyrics: Various
- Book: Mike Craver; Mark Hardwick; Debra Monk; Mary Murfitt
- Productions: 1987 Off-Broadway

Oil City Symphony is a musical with a book by Mike Craver, Mark Hardwick, Debra Monk, and Mary Murfitt and songs by various composers. It is a recreation of a recital by four middle-aged amateur musicians who have reunited in the auditorium of the Ohio high school they attended in the 1960s to pay tribute to music teacher Miss Hazel Reaves, who is retiring. The musical ran for 626 performances off-Broadway.

All four, whose combined talents "represent 127 years of total studying time," aspired to show business careers, but none of them ever left their small hometown. Debbie, the ex-prom queen, plays the drums and percussion; Mark, the minister of music at his church, is a pianist and accordionist; Mary, a rabid fan of women's roller derby remembered for her portrayal of Anita in a local production of West Side Story, plays the violin, saxophone, flute, and slide whistle; and Mike, a former member of an acid rock band, is a master of the synthesizer and vibraslap.

== Background ==
Debra Monk and Mark Hardwick were fellow students at Southern Methodist University and later helped write and performed in the 1981 musical Pump Boys and Dinettes. Hardwick and Mike Craver met during Pump Boys and began playing piano duets. The two were joined by Debra Monk on drums. The trio expanded to a quartet with Sharon Scruggs on violin and group made its premiere performance at the Doo Wop Club in New York City on May 12, 1986. When Scruggs decided to leave the group, she was replaced by Mary Murfitt via an audition.

Miss Reaves, the evening's guest of honor who is seated in the audience but never seen, is based on Hardwick's music teacher Denny Eaves.

== Productions ==
Following limited runs in Dallas and Baltimore, the off-Broadway production, starring the four creators, opened at the Circle in the Square Theatre Downtown in Greenwich Village on November 5, 1987, and closed on May 7, 1989, after 626 performances. It won the Drama Desk Award for Best Ensemble and the Outer Critics Circle Award for Outstanding Off-Broadway Musical, and Mary Murfitt won the Theatre World Award for her performance.

== Critical reception ==
In his review in The New York Times, Mel Gussow called it "a musical with charm and a sure sense of its own identity," and the theatre critic for Variety said it was "an endearing slice of nostalgic Americana that few will resist." In Time, Michael Walsh called the musical "very funny indeed" and said it "lets the good times roll, and in the process skewers every high school music program in the country." (but lovingly).

== Musical numbers ==
- Count Your Blessings
- Czardas
- The Anvil Chorus
- In-A-Gadda-Da-Vida
- Ohio Afternoon
- Baby, It's Cold Outside
- The Hokey Pokey
- Beaver Ball at the Bug Club
- The Beehive Polka
- A Patriotic Fantasy
- Dizzy Fingers
- Getting Acquainted
- Iris
- The End of the World
- Dear Miss Reeves
- Coaxing the Piano
- Bus Ride
- In the Sweet Bye and Bye
- My Ol' Kentucky Rock and Roll Home
- Exodus
- Sleigh Ride
- Christmas Medley
- Summer Medley
