= Mantawi Festival =

The Mantawi Festival was an annual festival celebrated every year on May 7th in Mandaue City in Cebu, Philippines. It was replaced by the Panagtagbo Festival.

== History ==
The city of Mandaue and the festival is named after a tree that grew abundantly in the shores of the Cebu. The cove was founded by Portuguese explorer Ferdinand Magellan on April 7, 1521, while in search for food and supplies. On the island a settlement was then built. The discovery of the cove, present day Tipolo, brought about the establishment of the first drydocking facility in the islands. In 1565, the Spanish explorer Miguel López de Legazpi arrived in the Philippines five decades after the Magellan expedition and built the Philippines' first drydock on the shores of Tipolo, about a few meters from the San Miguel Brewery Complex. The drydock was built by the facility served the Galleon ships that established trade with Mexico and Spain. From that beginning, Mandaue emerged as the industrial hub of the southern Philippines, the city of Mandaue.

== Festival ==
The founding of the settlement Mandawe on April 7, 1521, has historical value and significance in the history of Cebu. In order to commemorate the city's foundation, a festival was conceptualized and came to be known as the Mantawi Festival.

The festival was a project started by the former mayor of Mandaue City. It was first celebrated on the 33rd charter day celebration of Mandaue, August 30, 2002. The next year, the day of the festival was changed to the last Sunday of August since it overwhelmed the city's charter day celebration the year before. In 2004, the festival was stopped due to organizational problems. In 2005 the date was again moved to May 7 to coincide with the city's fiesta celebration.

The festival is a symbol of Mandaue City's history. Its historical past affirms its present identity as a highly urbanized industrial center and a new tourism destination where arts and culture become tools for progress and prosperity. The highlight of the festival is a parade of street dancers and dioramas showcasing the history and culture of Mandaue accompanied by brass instruments. Industries in the city join in on the celebration with their creatively crafted floats. Other participants range from government officials, teachers and students. In 2005, the festival was opened for participation from places outside Cebu. The festival also includes the parade of higantes (giants)--The people who shaped the present Mandaue City. The festival culminates in the awarding of the winners of the street dance and float competition followed by a grand fireworks display.

The festival has since been replaced by the Panagtagbo Festival to highlight the role of Mandaue in the Sinulog religious activities, specifically the Translacion of the Santo Niño de Cebu and Our Lady of Guadalupe of Cebu to the National Shrine of St. Joseph as an act of contemplation and devotion to the Holy Family.

== Historical accuracy ==
The questions about authenticity of Datu Lambuzzan, the said chieftain of Mandaue before the Spanish Period, were raised. As well as the existence of the vine or tree which they call Mantawi.
