= C. Bernard Jackson =

American dramatist

- Born: Clarence Bernard Jackson; November 4, 1927; New York, New York, USA
- Died: July 16, 1996 (aged 68); Los Angeles, California, USA
- Education: Brooklyn College; UCLA
- Occupations: Arts administrator, playwright
- Writing career
- Period: 1959-1996
- Notable work: Fly Blackbird
- Notable awards: Obie Award (1962)

C. Bernard Jackson (November 4, 1927 – July 16, 1996) was an African-American playwright and the founder of the Inner City Cultural Center in Los Angeles. Inner City was one of the first arts institutions in the United States to promote multiculturalism. The facility nurtured the careers of numerous performers, including Beah Richards, George Takei, Edward James Olmos, Nobu McCarthy and Forest Whitaker.

== Biography ==
=== Background ===
Clarence Bernard Jackson was the only child of Clarence I. and Ruth R. (Brown) Jackson, who were both originally from Dinwiddie County, Virginia. His father was employed as a doorman at an apartment building. The younger Jackson grew up in the Bedford-Stuyvesant section of Brooklyn, New York, where he was involved in one of the city's toughest street gangs. Because he was able to speak Spanish, Jackson often served in a diplomatic capacity.

When he enrolled in the High School of Music and Art, Jackson was able to escape the negative influences of his neighborhood and obtain a broader view of the world. He subsequently attended Brooklyn College and pursued a master's degree in music at UCLA.

=== Career ===
In 1959, Jackson co-wrote (with James Hatch), the book and music for Fly Blackbird, a musical dealing with civil rights. The production featuring a multi-ethnic cast was very popular with Los Angeles audiences, if not with critics. Fly Blackbird opened off-Broadway in 1961 and received an Obie Award for Best Musical the following year.

In the wake of the 1965 Watts Riots, Jackson founded the Inner City Cultural Center in Central Los Angeles. Unlike other arts organizations that catered to one ethnic group or another, Inner City operated under the concept of multiculturalism and provided assistance to a wide variety of cultural institutions. This included Luis Valdez's El Teatro Campesino, the East West Players and the Bilingual Foundation for the Arts, founded by Carmen Zapata.

Inner City's multi-cultural approach did not come without criticism from the black artistic community and the mainstream press, despite the fact that Inner City was also the largest producer of black theatre in Los Angeles.

Jackson was also a proponent of non-traditional casting. For example, in 1975, Inner City produced Maggie The Mouse Meets The Dirty Rat Fink, a Christmas musical that was written by Jackson. In the production, a black man and woman were cast as the parents of a Japanese daughter and a Chicano son. The following year, Jackson staged, Langston Hughes Said, a musical tribute to the Harlem Renaissance writer. The production included Hughes's one-act play, Soul Gone Home and featured a Chinese mother with her son played simultaneously by two actors, one black and the other Chicano.

Throughout his thirty years as executive director of the Inner City Cultural Center, Jackson nurtured numerous artists at various stages in their careers.

He died on July 16, 1996. In the wake of his death, playwright George C. Wolfe recalled how Jackson encouraged him to stage one of his early projects, "Tribal Rites, or The Coming of the Great God-bird Nabuku to the Age of Horace Lee Lizer." "Though I've been involved in many projects since," Wolfe said, "this production was perhaps the most crucial to my evolution" as an artist.

== Honors and awards ==
- 1962: Obie Award for Best Musical – Fly Blackbird
