= Portofino (musical) =

- Music: Louis Bellson; Will Irwin
- Lyrics: Richard Ney; Sheldon Harnick
- Book: Richard Ney
- Productions: 1958 Broadway

Portofino is a musical with a book by Richard Ney (who also served as producer), lyrics by Ney and Sheldon Harnick, and music by Louis Bellson and Will Irwin.

In his book on Broadway, The Season, William Goldman described its growing pains similarly to Buttrio Square and Breakfast at Tiffany's.

Set in a piazza in the Italian resort town of Portofino, the plot involves auto-racing duke Nicky; his Texan rival Kitty; his granddaughter Angela, a practicing witch; the local padre; and his look-alike Guido, an emissary from the devil.

When critics crucified the show during its Philadelphia tryout, Ney, the producer, left it to the cast to decide if they should continue to New York City, they voted to continue.

The Broadway production, directed by Karl Genus and choreographed by Charles Weidman and Ray Harrison with lighting by Lee Watson, opened on February 21, 1958, at the Adelphi Theatre, where it ran for three performances. The cast included Georges Guétary as Nicky, Helen Gallagher as Kitty, Jan Chaney as Angela, and Robert Strauss as both the padre and Guido. Its overall reception was poor.

== Songs ==
Act I

- Come Along
- No Wedding Bells for Me
- Come Along (Reprise)
- Red-Collar Job
- Here I Come
- New Dreams for Old
- A Dream for Angela
- Isn't It Wonderful?
- Dance of the Whirling Wimpus
- Under a Spell

Act II

- Under a Spell (Reprise)
- That's Love
- Too Little Time for Love
- Guido's Tango
- It Might Be Love
- Here I Come (Reprise)
- Bacchanale
- Morning Prayer
- Kitty Car Ballet
- The Grand Prix of Portofino
- Portofino
- I'm in League with the Devil
- Why Not for Marriage
- Portofino (Reprise)

== Sources ==
Not Since Carrie: Forty Years of Broadway Musical Flops by Ken Mandelbaum, published by St. Martin's Press (1991) (ISBN 0-312-06428-4)
