= William C. K. Irwin =

American composer and conductor

William C. K. Irwin (January 3, 1907 – October 23, 1998) was an American pianist, conductor, and songwriter.

Irwin was born in San Francisco, and raised in Louisville, Kentucky. With Australian composer Percy Grainger, Irwin studied composition before joining the Manhattan School of Music in New York City.

The musical theatre composer Vernon Duke introduced Irwin to composer and songwriter George Gershwin in the 1920s. Irwin would subsequently join Gershwin and pianist Oscar Levant in piano improvisations at Gershwin's apartment. Irwin began a six-year professional relationship with songwriter and composer Irving Berlin, after being introduced to him by Gershwin. As Berlin could not read or write music Irwin would write down music as Berlin composed, often writing music down for Berlin in the middle of the night.

Irwin was professionally engaged as the musical director of touring productions of the musicals Oklahoma!, South Pacific and The King and I in the 1940s. In the 1960s Irwin became the choral director for Manhattan's Radio City Music Hall and later the halls staff composer and musical director. Irwin retired in 1979, and his wife Helen, died in 1984. They had a son, Dean, who was a television producer for ABC News. Irwin had lived in Staten Island for many years before his death in 1998.

== Selected works ==
Irwin contributed songs and incidental music to the following musicals:

- Sweet and Low (1930)

"When a Pansy Was a Flower" (with lyrics by Billy Rose and Malcolm McComb)
"Revival Days" (lyrics by McComb)

- Hey Nonny Nonny! (1932); music by Irwin and Michael H. Cleary, Herman Hupfeld, Alberta Nichols

"Hey Nonny Nonny"
"I'm Really Not That Way" (lyrics by McComb)
"In Those Good Old Horsecar Days" (lyrics by McComb)

- Earl Carroll's Sketch Book (1935); music and lyrics by Irwin and others
- Portofino (1958); music by Irwin and Louie Bellson
