= If I Embarrass You, Tell Your Friends =

If I Embarrass You, Tell Your Friends is a musical about the life of comedian Belle Barth, written by Joanne Koch. The title derives from a catchphrase of Barth's.

Koch had previously written about Barth in her 1996 Off Broadway play Sophie, Totie, & Belle.

== Plot ==
The musical presents a fictionalised 1961 rehearsal between Barth and her pianist, set shortly after an unsuccessful performance at Carnegie Hall. The Carnegie Hall show was a real event, at which Barth, under advisement, had toned down the ribald material in her act and received a disappointing reception. The musical shows Barth contemplating the changes she should make to return to success with a forthcoming Miami show. The musical features a series of comic songs and uses several of Barth's own trademark jokes.

== Cast ==
The show featured Bethany Thomas as Barth, Courtney Crouse as a number of male characters representing men from Barth's life, and Gerald H. Bailey as Barth's pianist.

== Performances ==
The musical was workshopped at the STAGES 2008 Festival of New Musicals before premiering at Chicago's No Exit Café. In November 2008, it moved to the Theo Ubique Theatre, where it ran through December.

== Critical reception ==
The Chicago Reader called Koch's script "derivative and forgettable" but praised the performance of Bethany Thomas as Barth. Time Out Chicago was also impressed with Thomas's acting, but criticized the script as slight. The Windy City Times found the score unoriginal and the ribaldry of the jokes tame by 21st century standards, but recommended the show for its humor.
