= David Holcenberg =

Broadway musical director

David Holcenberg is an American musical director, orchestrator, musical arranger, conductor, composer, and keyboardist. He is best known for his musical direction of Broadway works such as Seussical, Mamma Mia!, Ghost, Bye Bye Birdie, The Story of My Life, Good Vibrations, Titanic, Rocky, Show Boat, Matilda the Musical, Groundhog Day, and MJ the Musical.

Holcenberg wrote music and lyrics for Bingo! The Winning Musical alongside Michael Heitzman and Ilene Reid. Bingo first premiered in 2001 at the Hermosa Beach Playhouse. Following a production at the Ordway Center of the Performing Arts the same year and at the Adirondack Theatre Festival in 2003, Bingo premiered off-broadway at St. Luke's Theater on November 7, 2005. Bingo! The Winning Musical is available for licensing by Concord Theatricals.

Holcenberg was nominated for a Tony Award and won a Drama Desk Award in 2022 for orchestrations for MJ the Musical. He was also nominated for a Grammy in 2023 for Best Musical Theater Album for MJ The Musical.

Holcenberg was the music director for Bartram and Hill's adaptation of Timothy Findley's 1984 novel Not Wanted on the Voyage, staged at Northwestern University in 2010 as part of the American Music Theatre Project.

== Stage credits ==
| Year | Title | Role | Venue | Ref. |
|---|---|---|---|---|
| 1994 | Show Boat | Associate Conductor, Piano | Broadway, Gershwin Theatre | |
| 1997 | Titanic | Music Director | Broadway, Lunt-Fontanne Theatre | |
| 2000 | Seussical | Musical Director, Conductor | Broadway, Richard Rodgers Theatre | |
| 2001 | Mamma Mia! | Musical Director, Conductor | Broadway, Broadhurst Theatre | |
| 2001 | Bingo! The Winning Musical | Music, Lyrics | Regional, Hermosa Beach Playhouse | |
| 2001 | Bingo! The Winning Musical | Music, Lyrics | Regional, Ordway Center of the Performing Arts | |
| 2001 | Bingo! The Winning Musical | Music, Lyrics | Regional, Adirondack Theatre Festival | |
| 2005 | Good Vibrations | Musical Supervisor | Broadway, Eugene O'Neill Theatre | |
| 2005 | Bingo! The Winning Musical | Music, Lyrics | Off-Broadway, St. Luke's Theatre | |
| 2009 | The Story of My Life | Music Director, Conductor | Broadway, Booth Theatre | |
| 2009 | Bye Bye Birdie | Music Director, Conductor | Broadway, Henry Miller's Theatre | |
| 2010 | Not Wanted on the Voyage | Music Director | University, Northwestern University | |
| 2012 | Ghost The Musical | Music Director, Conductor | Broadway, Lunt-Fontanne Theatre | |
| 2014 | Rocky | Music Supervisor | Broadway, Winter Garden Theatre | |
| 2015 | Matilda | Musical Director, Conductor | Broadway, Shubert Theatre | |
| 2017 | Groundhog Day | Musical Director, Conductor | Broadway, August Wilson Theatre | |
| 2022 | MJ | Music Supervision, Orchestrations | Broadway, Neil Simon Theatre | |
| 2025 | Mamma Mia! | Associate Music Director | Broadway, Winter Garden Theatre | |

== Awards and nominations ==
| Year | Award | Category | Work | Result | Ref. |
|---|---|---|---|---|---|
| 2022 | Tony Award | Best Orchestrations | MJ | Nominated | |
| 2022 | Drama Desk Award | Outstanding Orchestrations | MJ | Won | |
| 2022 | Outer Critics Circle Award | Outstanding Orchestrations | MJ | Nominated | |
| 2023 | Grammy Award | Best Musical Theater Album | MJ | Nominated | |
