= Kisses on a Postcard =

Kisses on a Postcard is a stage musical written by Terence Frisby with music by Gordon Clyde, John Altman, and Tom Recknell based on Frisby's experiences as an evacuee, or 'vacky', during World War II. When he was just 7 and his brother Jack was 11, they were sent from their family in South East London to Doublebois, a small village in Cornwall, to escape German bombing during the Battle of Britain. They were two of over three and a half million children evacuated from cities in Britain, the largest migration of people in UK history.

The musical began as the radio play Just Remember Two Things: It's Not Fair And Don't Be Late, which was broadcast on BBC Radio 4 and on BBC World Service. It won Frisby the Giles Cooper Award for Best Radio Play in 1988.

The musical was premiered at the Queens Theatre in Barnstaple in 2004 under the title Just Remember Two Things.

Frisby's account of his evacuation experience was later published as Kisses on a Postcard: A Tale of Wartime Childhood (2009, Bloomsbury.)
