= Herbert Darnley =

British music hall comedian, song writer, recording artist and theatrical producer

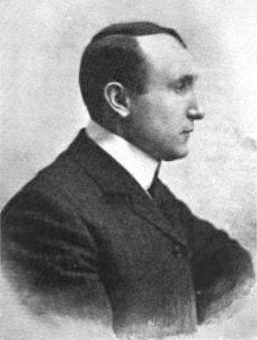
- In The Sketch, 5 August 1903
- Born: Herbert Walter McCarthy; 12 May 1872; Chatham, Kent, England
- Died: 6 February 1947 (aged 74); Brixton, Lambeth, England
- Occupation(s): Comedian, writer, vocalist, producer

Herbert Darnley (12 May 1872 – 6 February 1947), real name Herbert Walter McCarthy, was a British music hall comedian, song writer, popular early recording artist and theatrical producer, active from the 1890s until the early 1940s, who claimed descent from Edmund Kean.

== Early life ==
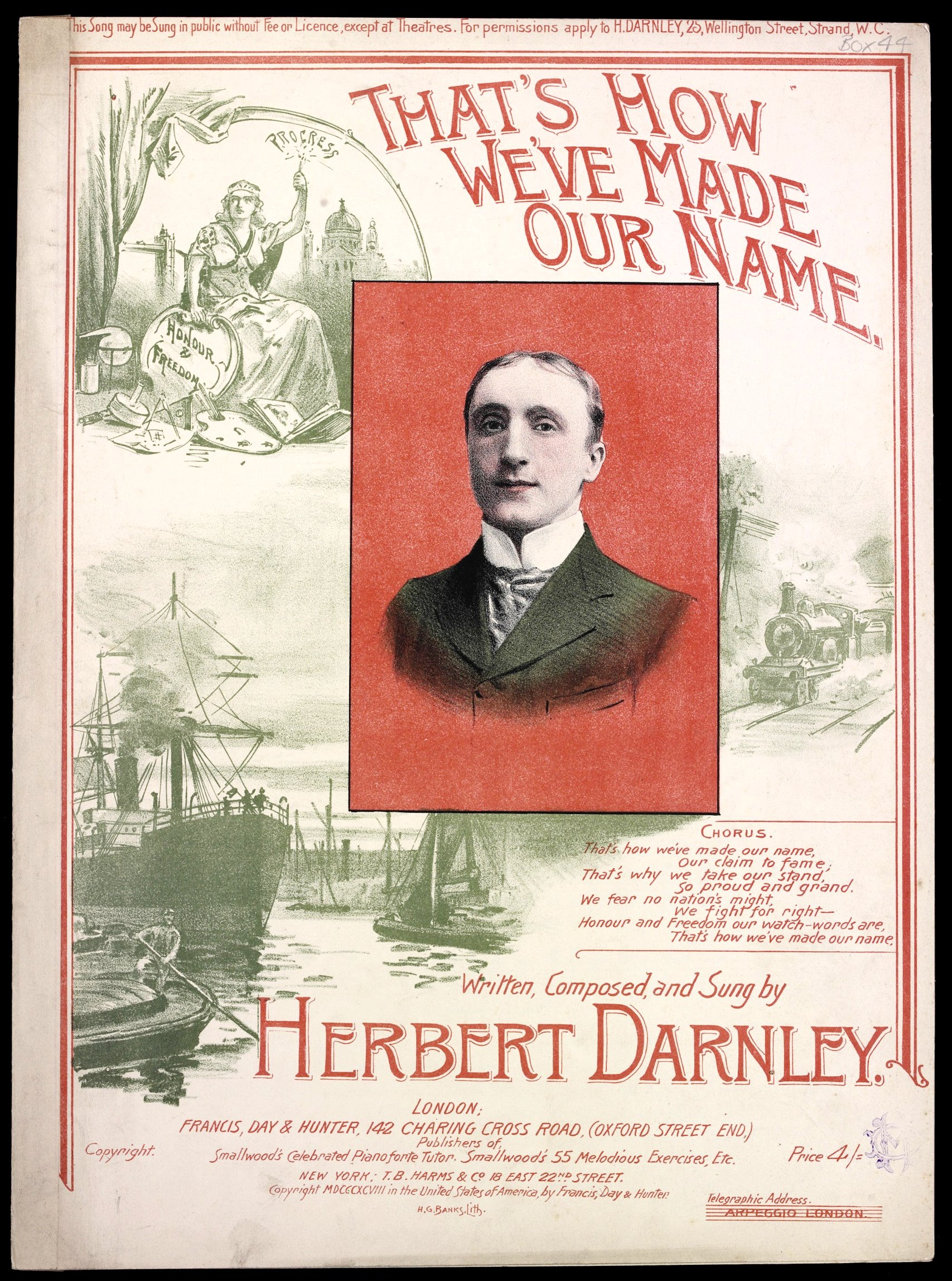
Score for "That's How We've Made Our Name", 1898, a patriotic song written, composed and sung by Herbert Darnley, who is shown on the cover

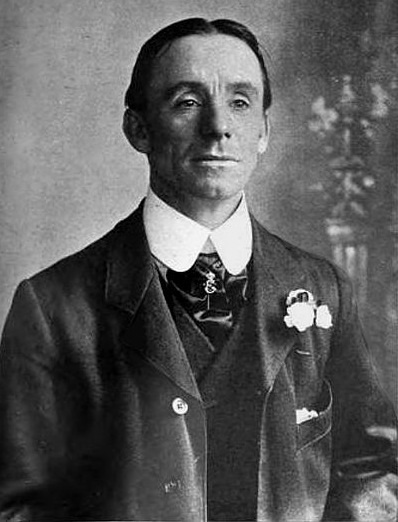
Dan Leno out of costume

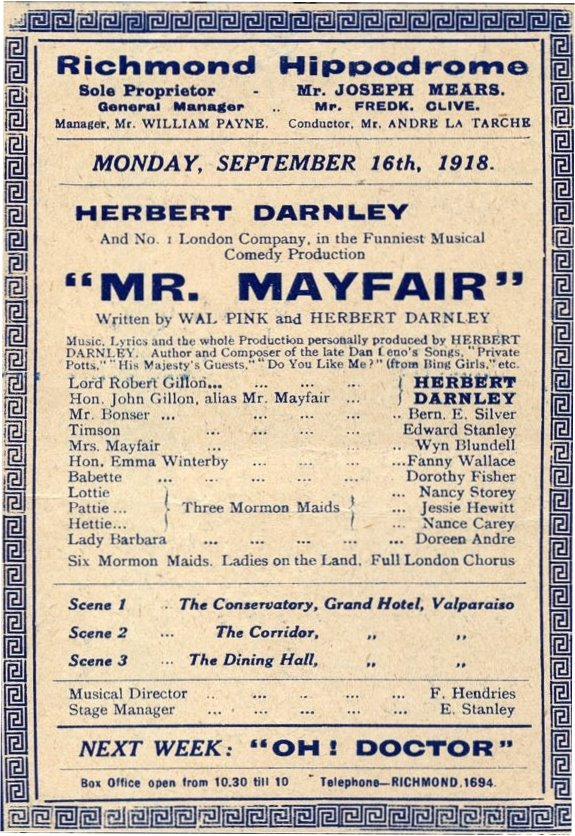
Poster for Mr. Mayfair, Richmond Hippodrome, 1918

Herbert was born Herbert Walter McCarthy in Chatham in Kent, England.

== Dan Leno ==
From the 1890s, Darnley was the major song writer for "The King's jester" Dan Leno. Darnley's Mr Wix of Wickham toured in 1902, starting at the Borough Theatre, Stratford in July. It starred Leno in a male lead role as Mr Wix who performed his signature clog dance and appeared with his daughter Georgina. The production opened in New York around 1904 or 1905 with over half the song composed by Jerome Kern.

== "God Save the King" ==
In 1902, Darnley released a recording of "God Save the King". The introducer claimed the song to have been written by Henry Carey and that Darnley was his descendant.

== Fred Karno ==
In 1906, Darnley was mentioned as general manager and producer in advertising for Fred Karno's companies, second only to Karno himself.

== Film ==
A Darnley ballad was adapted for a nine-minute silent film, Napoleon and the English Sailor, released by Gaumont in 1908, in which he also starred. Shortly afterwards, Gaumont produced a version of Darnley's sketch Moving In using members of his own troupe.

== Murder ==
Darnley wrote By Whose Hand?, a murder story that was staged at the Pavilion Theatre in Leicester, in 1929 in which Dolores played the lead. Darnley gave a speech in which he said he was pleased to remove Dolores from the "human wolves" of London who "were trying to tear her to pieces." The production toured throughout 1929, reaching Mexborough and the Theatre Royal, Sheffield.

== William Hickey ==
In 1934, Darnley was profiled in the William Hickey "These Names Make News" column in The Daily Express. Darnley was said to have claimed a family history going back more than 250 years in show business, including Edmund Kean and Henry Carey and to have personally started in the business aged 5. The column noted his "sweepstake attitude to life" and his many highs and lows, including owning two theatres, losing thousands in theatrical productions and sleeping rough on the embankment next to the River Thames.

== Death ==
In January 1943, Darnley was playing Widow Twankey in the pantomime Aladdin and His Lamp at the Theatre Royal, Exeter which may be his last professional engagement. He died at his home in Brixton on 6 February 1947.

== Selected songs ==
- "That's How We've Made Our Name" (1898)
- "My Way Is Your Way" (1900)
- "My Next Door Neighbour's Garden"
- "What Do You Think of the Irish?"
- "Sons of Our Empire"
- "Some Mother Will Lose a Son"
