= Siddhartha (musical) =

Promotional poster, 2007

Prince Siddhartha the Musical is an original musical production by Chu Un Temple, and directed under the Fo Guang Shan Academy of Art of the Philippines. The musical is an adaptation of The Biography of Sakyamuni Buddha, written by Buddhist monk Hsing Yun, founder of the Fo Guang Shan Buddhist Order in Taiwan.

The first run of the show was on July 6, 2007, at the Waterfront Cebu under the name Siddhartha: A Musical Journey to Enlightenment. Due to the positive response and overall success of the show, the cast was invited to perform excerpts of the musical at Fo Guang Shan in Kaohsiung, Taiwan in celebration of Hsing Yun's birthday in September 2007.

A repeat performance of the musical in its entirety at the Cultural Center of the Philippines in Manila was successfully concluded on November 4, 2007. The Manila show was presented by I.B.P.S. Manila, Philippines and Buddha's Light International Association - Philippines.

The CCP show was originally scheduled for three performances (two on November 3 and one on November 4). Due to the high demand for tickets, an additional performance was added on November 4. The entire cast performed in Kaohsiung and Taipei, Taiwan, in mid May 2008.

The musical is set to premiere in the United States in 2013 to commemorate the 25th anniversary of Hsi Lai Temple's establishment.
