= Romuald Bulfinsky =

Romanian actor and theatrical manager (1878–1953)

- Bulfinsky in 1943
- Born: 23 November 1878; Craiova, Principality of Romania
- Died: 13 January 1953 (aged 74); Bucharest, Romanian People's Republic
- Other name: Romald Bulfinsky
- Occupations: Actor; educator; manager
- Years active: c. 1900–1948
- Spouse: Maria Ciucurescu (m. 1913–1939)
- Awards: Order of Cultural Merit (1947)

Romuald or Romald Bulfinsky, also known as Bulfinschi or Bulfinski (23 November 1878 – 13 January 1953), was a Romanian actor, comedian, and theatrical manager. Remarked for his bass voice and athletic build, he debuted as a child singer; he also attended the Bucharest Conservatory in 1900, but only graduated, out of necessity, in 1921, preferring to work for the in-between decades as a lay actor. His first stage work was done at the National Theater Craiova, and, in the 1900s, he toured the country with a topical political show, Drama dela Belgrad. Bulfinsky, who studied theatrical realism with Ion Livescu, and was influenced by Ermete Novelli, acquired his fame at the National Theater Iași, and, in 1909, was recruited by Alexandru Davila's itinerant troupe. He returned to Craiova in the 1910s, assisting Emil Gârleanu with reviving the theatrical movement in Oltenia. In tandem, he helped lay the groundwork for a local film industry, starring in the highly popular production Oțelul răzbună. Bulfinsky and his wife Maria Ciucurescu were then employed by the National Theater Bucharest, which was the Romanian Kingdom's trendsetting venue. Here, Romuald's acting skills helped consolidate the success of local dramatists—including Octavian Goga, Nicolae Iorga, Mihail Sorbul, and Caton Theodorian.

At the peak of World War I, during a period of heavy losses for Romania, Bulfinsky returned to Iași, the temporary capital, and helped boost morale with patriotic performances. His early triumphs in interwar Greater Romania included new standards within the local Shakespearean tradition, with acclaimed takes on Sir Toby Belch, King Claudius, John Falstaff, Petruchio, and Macduff; in addition, he had his second silver-screen credit, as the eponymous rabbi in Jean Mihail's Manasse—which remains recognized as one of the main creations in local silent film. Building on his popularity, he merged his status as a state-sponsored member of the National Theater with stints at Comedia and Teatrul Mic, sparking protests from colleagues who could not hold concurrent sources of income. He was also criticized for his touring repertoire, which was considered beneath his artistic capabilities. By the time of the Great Depression, Bulfinsky was scoring easy hits with boulevardier plays, in which he was directed by Victor Ion Popa and Sică Alexandrescu. Such work peaked in 1930, when he had an extended-run production of Ladislas Fodor's Church Mouse. Though the artistic level of such shows was descending as the Depression deepened, his own acting was regarded as superior, capable of rescuing mediocre or ribald content.

Bulfinsky reached his zenith as a Shakespearean actor in his late fifties, with highly elaborate productions by Soare Z. Soare. He then retired, but returned to the stage several times during World War II, usually with private companies. He became vocal about his left-wing convictions after the anti-fascist coup of 1944; he briefly worked at The Barașeum, with a stage version of The Moon Is Down. In 1947, he returned a third and final time to the Craiova stage, this time as a manager. The new communist regime welcomed his showcasing of "progressive" plays, but also expressed disapproval of his "bourgeois" remnants. Bulfinsky resigned in 1948, spending his remaining years as a pensioner of the state.

== Beginnings ==
Bulfinsky was born in Craiova on 23 November 1878. He belonged partly to the Polish Romanian community: his father had fled Congress Poland in the Great Emigration, and had married a Romanian woman upon settling in Wallachia. Here, he opened a carriage repair shop. Romuald grew up on and around Independenței Street, an area which is also where he finished gymnasium. Remarked for his bass voice, he was recruited by the local music teacher, Elie Michăilescu, to sing in a Romanian Orthodox religious choir, organized at Saint Elijah Church. He claimed to have been involved with many combat sports at an amateur level, including boxing, fencing, and Greco-Roman wrestling, to the point where other youth feared and respected him; also by his own account, he practiced weightlifting in his father's shop, until he was able to raise a regular-sized carriage on his shoulders. He also obtained a velocipede that he rode to Mehadia and Calafat.

For reasons that he did not clarify, young Bulfinsky had to take his high-school courses in various areas of the Romanian Kingdom, including Turnu Severin and in Brăila; he sang in another boys' choir, sponsored by the Brăila Orthodox Bishopric, where he met and befriended George Niculescu, a future opera star. Bulfinsky ultimately graduated from Nicolae Bălcescu National College. Here, he had been classmates with future writers Panait Cerna and Ion Al. Vasilescu-Valjean, with whom he had co-founded a small literary club. Initially passionate about mathematics, he was drawn to art during his time away from Craiova, suggesting that melancholy was a main driver for this change. In May 1901, he was attested as a first-year student at the Bucharest Conservatory, remarked by journalist Emil Fagure for his passionate rendition of Vasile Alecsandri's epic poem, Hogea Murat. His first job as an actor was with the National Theater Craiova (TNC), while his first stage director was Al. Demetrescu Dan.

Bulfinsky debuted in 1902—playing Mikes in Alexandru Davila's tragedy, Vlaicu Vodă. In summer of the following year, he was part of a makeshift troupe, performing Drama dela Belgrad—a dramatization of the Serbian May Coup, in which he played the antagonist, Aleksandar Mašin. The text had been written over one night by his colleague, Constantin Radovici, as a way to profit from the affair. On its premiere in Turnu Severin, it took in 1,100 lei, which was more than ten times the average. The company began touring Oltenian towns (during August 1903, their presence was recorded in Corabia). The troupe ran into trouble when touring Serb-populated areas, who hated Mašin that they became threatening toward the actor impersonating him. He was never invited to banquets, whereas Victor Antonescu, who played the murdered king, was addressed as "Your Majesty" and paraded around town. The troupe was eventually invited to Bucharest, the national capital, as a permanent feature on the playbill at Eforie Hall. As recorded by the impresario Gaby Michailescu, they had 90 consecutive shows with Drama dela Belgrad.

Aided by his success with Drama dela Belgrad, Radovici obtained permanent employment at the TNC, for himself and his whole troupe. They performed the same play eleven times in a row, which reportedly rescued that institution's finances. In September 1905, Bulfinsky announced his engagement to a Craiovan woman, Fani Petrici. At Craiova, he was coached by the lead actor Ion Livescu; into the following decades, he declared Livescu to have been his first real teacher (a pronouncement that Livescu himself took pride in quoting). In his memoirs, Livescu mentions Bulfinsky as one of his major allies in promoting theatrical realism, or "naturalness" (firesc), as a bulwark against crowd-pleasers and melodramas. Scholars replicate this verdict, also highlighting Bulfinsky's personal gifts and inclinations as a contributing factor to the realists' success. Theater historian Ioan Massoff retrospectively argued that he "possessed great talents, allowing him to perform in roles of the most bewildering variety". His colleague George Franga likewise notes: "Acting in tragedy, drama, as well as comedy, Romald Bulfinski, [had] a deep, roaring voice and a statuesque posture".

== TNI and TNB ==
For a while, Bulfinsky was also a civil servant, and as such was reassigned to Iași, at the other end of the country. Here, he initially lived outside Trei Ierarhi Church, on a street that he fondly remembered into old age. During the 1906–1907 TNI season, Bulfinsky worked at the National Theater Iași (TNI). In Maurice Landray's Victimes de la loi, which also introduced Maria Filotti, he won general praise (an exception was journalist Avram Steuerman-Rodion, who only deemed his contribution "satisfactory"). Early the following year, the same couple appeared in Ion Petrovici's verse drama, Urmările iertării; Bulfinsky was also cast in Alfred de Musset's Il ne faut jurer de rien, alongside Aglae Pruteanu. As the TNI reopened in October 1907, he and Ion Morțun took lead roles in Arthur Bernède's Sous l'Épaulette. As Massoff recounts, this political play, which was about issues specific to the French Army, "failed to interest the public". By October, Bulfinsky was starring in Ronetti Roman's Manasse, and was also, alongside Pruteanu, in Friedrich Hebbel's Judith. The following month, he was described as a "viguorous talent" by the local Evenimentul paper, for his work in Haralamb Lecca's Câinii.

Bulfinsky was sought after by Pompiliu Eliade, who had taken over as manager of the National Theater Bucharest (TNB); Eliade drafted a contract for him to sign. Shortly after, Bulfinsky and Morțun both resigned from the TNI, joining Davila's itinerant troupe rather than the TNB. By September 1909, they were doing shows at various theaters in Bucharest, alongside colleagues that had previously been with the TNB—including Livescu and Ion Manolescu. Also then, the company obtained that the prestigious humorist, Ion Luca Caragiale, write a short satirical play for them to perform in (called Începem, it mentions Bulfinsky by name). Upon witnessing his performance in Theodor M. Nicolau's Urmările unei minciuni, Viața Romînească journalist N. D. Cocea informed his readers:

It is difficult to say anything good or bad about Mr. Bulfinski. He possesses the correct traits of a conscientious actor. He probably has temperament, but he lacks a clear or broad understanding of the role. His performance is made up of fragments—the fragments of a skilled craftsman, but without a strong connection of all episodic components into an artistic synthesis.

As Michailescu records, Bulfinsky "did most of the plays" at Davila's company for two straight years, including by reprising Manasse. During January 1910, he was noticed by the columnist at Voința Națională for doing "the best possible" work as the family confessor in Georges Feydeau's Le Bourgeon. In February, he and Davila made a defiant return to Iași, performing four shows at the Sidoli Circus, in direct competition to the TNI. As the next season opened in Bucharest, he and Tony Bulandra evidenced themselves in Henri James de Rothschild's La Rampe. According to columnist Ion Foti, he was "admirable as a 'savage' fella" in the one-act play Femeile ciudate, by local authors Constantin Râuleț and Al. T. Stamatiad. Davila was also premiering Henry Bataille's Vierge folle. The play was panned by an Adevărul journalist, who noted that Bulfinsky, as "the girl's father", was "simply too soft". He was instead applauded for his appearances in a twin show of January 1911: as Simon in Théodore de Banville's Gringore and as Herod Antipas in Oscar Wilde's Salome.

Still from Oțelul răzbună. From the right: Bulfinsky; P. Bulandra; Aristide Demetriade; Marioara Cinski; I. Țancovici-Cosmin

In October 1911, after Emil Gârleanu had taken over as head of the Craiova theater, he called in Bulfinsky and Agatha Bârsescu as special guests. Together, they performed in Cu ochii plâng, a one-act play by A. de Herz. He was again in the city in January 1912, part of a TNC delegation that welcomed Italian virtuoso Ermete Novelli, who was touring with his company. He was then one of the few spectators who actually attended the shows, and recalled being fascinated: "Novelli was a true magician, in the face of whose art one just vanished, merging with the artist himself." Around that time, Bulfinsky took part in the creation of Romanian cinema, starring in Oțelul răzbună, a silent film produced by Leon Popescu. The footage is largely lost, with only one scene recovered in 1965 by researcher Ion Cantacuzino. The latter also reports that Oțelul răzbună, which was one of the few of its day to have any gravitas (including by casting Bulfinsky as an industrialist), was a massive hit with Romanians.

In 1913, Bulfinsky married actress Maria Ciucurescu. She was twelve years his senior, having been brought to the stage in the 19th century, after an encounter with Alecsandri. Ending his contract with Davila in mid-1913, Romuald returned to Gârleanu's TNC. He later claimed to have directly influenced Gârleanu's policy of hiring directors-in-residence as a way to diversify themes and shows. Bulfinsky himself did not stay in Craiova for very long, and was finally drafted by the TNB once Davila had been appointed its chairman. With Ciucurescu, Ion Brezeanu and Zaharia Bârsan, he was cast in Octavian Goga's Domnul notar, which premiered to rave reviews in February 1914. In June, he joined a TNB crew that performed in an open-air setting at Arenele Romane, with Joséphin Péladan's Sémiramis. Critic Petre Locusteanu argued that, while Bulfinsky and his colleagues were commendable, the show was overall bad, and did not translate well from the indoor stage.

== World War I ==
World War I broke out as Sémiramis was still being performed. Romania maintained an uneasy neutrality, punctuated by political disputes between supporters of the Entente and those who favored the German Empire and the other Central Powers. In October, Bulfinsky was starring in a well-received TNB production of Pour vivre heureux (by André Rivoire and Yves Mirande), sharing the stage with George Ciprian and Nicolae Soreanu. In March 1915, he was garnering praise for his contribution as Fotin in Caton Theodorian's Bujoreștii. For the 1915–1916 season, Paul Gusty realized his dream of directing The Lower Depths, by Maxim Gorky, at the TNB. Bulfinsky appeared therein as Satin, with Constantin Radovici as The Actor and Petre I. Sturdza as Luka. In early 1916, Bulfinsky was playing an authoritarian husband in Sorana (co-authored by Herz and Ioan Alexandru Brătescu-Voinești). Also then, he began his long association with dramatist Mihail Sorbul, appearing, alongside Elvira Popescu, in the first stagings of Sorbul's masterpiece, Patima roșie. Additionally, Bulfinsky began touring with an impromptu company formed around Bârsan. They reached Iași with Bârsan's own play, Trandafirii roșii.

Romania entered the war as an Entente country in mid-1916, but, by the end of that year, suffered a series of massive defeats, with Bucharest falling in December. Bulfinsky followed the retreating Romanian Land Forces to Iași, which was serving as the temporary capital of a rump Romanian state. Alongside Livescu, Maria Ventura and Constantin Nottara, he participated in the patriotic festival convened by Captain Eugeniu Adamovici of the Romanian Air Corps in January 1917. By March, he had returned to the TNI with an updated production of Patima roșie. In April, he was praised as the un-patriotic antagonist, Negrea, in Nicolae Iorga's Învierea lui Ștefan-cel-Mare. During the summer break, Bulfinsky appeared alongside Constantin Tănase and Alexandru Critico in A fost odată..., a revue by the pseudonymous "Durstroy"; proceeds went to the war invalids. In August, he was cast as General Gitarel in Henri Lavedan's Pour la patrie. The 1917–1918 season opened with Sorbul's political play, Dezertorul, which saw him performing alongside Ciucurescu. He was distinguished as Doctor Palmieri in La Morte civile, by Paolo Giacometti, produced by the TNI that September.

In early 1918, the Averescu cabinet in Iași sued for peace with the Central Powers, and negotiations began for a treaty acknowledging defeat. During April 1918, Bulfinsky attended a banquet in Iași, where he spoke admiringly about the staunchly anti-German Livescu. A Marghiloman cabinet, favorable to the Central Powers, took over in both Bucharest and Iași, sharing power with the German occupiers, and leaving the Ententists exposed to persecution. Bulfinsky was in occupied Bucharest by mid-1918, when the German authorities allowed the TNB to reconstruct its troupe. The one exception was Livescu, who was not allowed to return due to his political stances. For a while, Bulfinsky tried to mediate between the German censors and his former teacher, writing to the latter about his efforts. In September, Bulfinsky was also reportedly involved, alongside Filotti and Livescu, in an effort to preserve Petrovici at the helm of the TNI, against the newly appointed Gusty.

By the end of the year, the Central Powers were themselves defeated, and readying to sign an Armistice in the West. This marked a triumph for the Ententists at home, who retook power and rejoined the war effort in the East. At the time, Bulfinsky was at the TNB, rehearsing with Alfred Moșoiu's Jocul apelor. In December, he and his wife were again appearing in Dezertorul, now introduced as "about the recently ended tragedy of German occupation". By early 1919, he was part of the large (and well-received) supporting cast in Ion Peretz's Bimbașa-Sava, which had Aristide Demetriade in the title role. As the new season opened in September 1919, he appeared as Reverend Morell in George Bernard Shaw's Candida. Dimitrie Șerban of Viitorul gave a lukewarm review: "[Bulfinsky] tailored his oratorical speech perfectly to Morell's great quality, yet he fought a heavy battle with the nuances of transition, and his inner emotional movement could not rise to the power of his words." In December, he was King Claudius in Hamlet—the same Șerban noted that he was "rather good", but also that his role was merely "a sketch".

== Early 1920s fame ==
Victor Ion Popa's drawing of Bulfinsky as Boiu-Dorcani in Suflete tari

Bulfinsky's earliest work in interwar Greater Romania included a string of secondary roles. In early 1920, he was cast in TNB productions of Iorga's Mihai Viteazul and Constantin Râuleț's Baia domniței. Șerban remarked on his attempt at saving both texts, which he regarded as mediocre; he commended Bulfinsky especially for the mixture of strength and vulnerability that he applied to Râuleț's play. By April, Bulfinsky was also Minister Văleanu in Duiliu Zamfirescu's Poezia depărtărei—again disliked by Șerban for not catching the tragedy's poetic notes. As the 1920–1921 season opened, he impressed critics with twin creations in Shakespearean comedy: as Sir Toby Belch in the Twelfth Night, and as John Falstaff in The Merry Wives of Windsor. In June 1921, he and other TNB actors, including his wife, were touring Transylvania with Bujoreștii and the Twelfth Night, performing with these at the Cluj State Theater—again to rave reviews.

While fully tenured at the TNB, Bulfinsky only completed his formal education in 1921, when he passed his graduation exam at the Bucharest Conservatory. According to a legend recorded by Michailescu, he only bothered with this formality because of a bureaucratic provision which required all tenured actors to have diplomas; Nottara, as the attending professor, asked him to do just one line as Petruchio, in The Taming of the Shrew. From 1922, the Conservatory employed Bulfinsky himself as a professor of acting. Also that year, he appeared in Camil Petrescu's Suflete tari, at the TNB, while collaborating with a private company, Teatrul Mic—admired there for his appearance in Alfred Savoir's La Huitième Femme de Barbe-Bleue. At the TNB, he was much applauded in Macbeth, where he played Macduff—George Ciprian and George Storin alternated as the titular character, while Agepsina Macri appeared as Lady Macbeth. In early 1923, Gusty directed Bulfinsky as part of the ensemble cast in A Midsummer Night's Dream. He and George Vraca won A. de Herz's admiration for having "victoriously highlight[ed]" their "roles of lesser importance".

For the 1923–1924 season, he returned to his first play, Vlaicu Vodă, but as one of the boyar characters. A review by Benjamin Fondane in Adevărul Literar și Artistic expressed admiration: "One would want to listen indefinitely to the timbre of his warm, full voice." The TNB then produced Edmond Sée's Un ami de jeunesse. Bulfinsky earned praise from Iosif Nădejde, who noted his "impeccable" acting as a careerist, opposite Soreanu as the "destitute idealist". Also in late 1923, Bulfinsky and Macri were the stars of Henrik Ibsen's Rosmersholm, in a show that was overall panned by critics for having failed to capture the "nebulous Nordic atmosphere". He was seen by critics as "true and decisive" in Lulu, adapted by Hortensia Papadat-Bengescu from a novel by Eugen Lovinescu. Also then, Scarlat Froda made note of his "industrious" performance in Când vine viforul, a war-themed play by the prominent politician Gheorghe Tătărescu (where Vraca was cast as the antagonist, a "defeatist"). He was still doing Bujoreștii in early 1924, reviving it as an unusually great hit with the public.

Bulfinsky was one of several state-employed actors who branched out into private companies. Trade unions protested, noting that he was on a state subsidy while also potentially taking jobs away from colleagues who were not. Such actions did not curb the trend; in February 1924, the Society of Dramatic Artists held a banquet for Bulfinsky. It was attended by his schoolmate Vasilescu-Valjean, who had become chairman of the TNB, as well as by authors whose work he had helped promote (Brătescu-Voinești, Goga, Moșoiu, and Theodorian). Weeks layer, Bulfinsky appeared in Horia Furtună's lyrical dramatization of the Făt-Frumos stories. According to reviewer Paul I. Prodan, it was a charming play, with good acting by Bulfinsky, Ciprian, and Aura Buzescu.

== 1924 tours and Bulandra debacle ==
Also in March 1924, Bulfinsky announced that he was embarking on another Transylvanian tour, on which he would premiere Tartuffe, by Molière. The centerpiece was instead Cain, by Alexandru Sabaru—a play that had been earlier removed from the TNB program. The chroniclers at Rampa criticized such choices, as well as Bulfinsky's use an "utterly mediocre ensemble", suggesting that he was doing low-quality work for a provincial public. Bulfinsky and his wife (who was celebrating her jubilee as an actress) were instead well-received by both Romanian and Hungarian intellectuals in Satu Mare. This was noted by the local paper, Szamos, which described Cain as "an excitingly woven social drama". The same source dwelled on Bulfinsky's acting skills, noting that he could charm even those in the public with only a "rudimentary knowledge of Romanian": "Bulfinsky is an artist of immense dramatic power, reminiscent of the Hungarian actor Gyula Hegedűs. [...] He deeply feels his role, and his masterful labor indicates that those things he delivers come out from his very soul." Similar praise also appeared in Vestea of Alba Iulia, who described Bulfinsky as "a strong personality", "serious and grave in his selection of roles".

By mid-1924, Bulfinsky was also a regular at Bulandra Theater. The more junior Velimir Maximilian recalls that Bulfinsky was one of the troupe's "four pillars", alongside Storin, Tony Bulandra, and Maximilian himself. Their patience was put to the test during the 1924–1925 season, when they were made to act in Victorien Sardou's Patrie!. This was not just because the text was "soporific", but also because they had to wear fur jackets during "an unbearable heatwave." Froda was perplexed by the results: "Can one even speak of anyone so much as acting in this play? Let's just add that Mr. Bulfinsky had some impossible, and often cacophonous, stammers, and that he was completely devoid of conviction." As a chronicler at România daily, Liviu Rebreanu was more lenient: "The meritorious efforts of the lead actors saved the troupe's honor, but could not save the play, which left the impression of a ghost."

Bulfinsky made his TNB comeback in October 1924, when he appeared as Petruchio under Gusty's stage direction. According to Prodan's contemporary note, it was his second-best Shakespearean role. Journalist Pamfil Șeicaru was taken aback, concluding that: "Mr. Bulfinsky lives inside Shakespeare's resounding verve." Froda similarly commented that, though the translation had been of poor quality, Bulfinsky had reconfirmed his status as "a great comedic artist [of] imagination, verve, diction, and communicativeness." That November, he appeared alongside Nottara and Macri in Efitmiu's Thebaida, with contributions that journalist Dem. Theodorescu rated as "imposing". Before the end of 1924, Filotti and Bulfinsky were touring Bukovina with Suflete tari. After appearing at the Cernăuți Theater, a local notice in Glasul Bucovinei proclaimed him "a great artist", "effortless and natural in the holiest sense of the word."

Still in Bukovina on 20 January 1925, Bulfinsky reprised Candida for a gala show, personally attended by Vasilescu-Valjean; Vorwärts newspaper, put out for the Bukovina Germans, described the reception as "exceptionally weak", while assuring readers that "Mr. Bulfinsky delivered a strong and intelligent portrayal of Pastor Morell". Valjean's own comedy, Ce știa satul, was also performed the next day (Bulfinsky and co-star Ana Luca were reportedly rewarded with "thunderous applause"). Bulfinsky returned to Bucharest by February 1925, when he was under contract with Marioara Voiculescu's private theater; together, they did Frank Wedekind's Earth Spirit, which also used Ciprian and a younger actress, Marietta Sadova.

== Manasse film and first Ventura plays ==
Manasse's death scene in the eponymous film. Also shown: Joseph Kamen, Maria Ciucurescu, and Alexandru Finți

In 1925, Bulfinsky reprised his older role in Manasse for a filmed version, directed by Jean Mihail. He worked without remuneration, and did the indoor scenes at Comedia Theater, filming on a graveyard-shift schedule (while still appearing on stage each evening). Like the play which inspired it, Manasse was controversial for its depiction of Romanian Jewish communities; he was the titular rabbi, while his real-life spouse appeared as a "red-haired Jewess". Filmmaker Marcel Blossoms was enthusiastic about his acting, predicting a great future in cinema. Blossoms also recounts the adventures of the film crew, which had to film on location in Văcărești, among hostile, traditionalist Jews, who were prevented from interfering only by "Mr. Bulfinsky's authoritative voice". Released later that year, Manasse is treasured by film historian Simion Alterescu as one of the more accomplished works in early Romanian cinema—as well as a revisitable document about the style of Romanian stage actors.

According to several columnists, Bulfinsky's acting was the only redeeming quality in Beaumarchais' Barber of Seville, as produced by Soare Z. Soare at the TNB in early 1925. As the 1925–1926 season opened, he had a guest spot at the Bucharest People's Theater (a Iorga-led institution), where he recited the prologue to Cometa, a 1910s classic by Dimitrie Anghel and Ștefan Octavian Iosif. Immediately after, he resurfaced at the TNB, playing Mephistopheles in Corneliu Moldovanu's adaptation of Faust, with Soare as director. Reception was mixed, with critics suggesting that he appeared unfit for the role. Bulfinsky was additionally cast in another one of Iorga's historical plays—a retelling of the Meșterul Manole legend, in which he was Neagoe Basarab. His performance was described by România's columnist as "correct", whereas Macri (as Ana lui Manole) was "wonderful", "the evening's heroine".

Around that time, Bulfinsky was involved with a project to revive Vlaicu Vodă at the TNI, intending to appear therein as Costea. It was dropped for several reasons, including his conflict with the author, Alexandru Davila, whom he accused of having engineered it so that he would not get the role. During late 1925, Bulfinsky and his wife were touring the Banat with their own Faust, with several performances at Timișoara National Theater. The production was suspended in Bucharest, with Ciprian announced as a new Mephistopheles. In December, the Bulfinskys returned to Satu Mare, where they staged both Faust and the Barber of Seville under the TNB banner, and with Pepe Georgescu directing. A local journalist, C. M. Deleni, this troupe "succeeded in rendering, thanks to remarkable talents and a masterful stagecraft, that which is the true poetic nature of theater." The shows were also taken to Cluj, and performed in front of a packed hall, for spectators who reportedly "know entire passages from [Faust] by heart."

During early 1926, Bulfinsky and Soare were engaged in the TNB ceremonies marking Maria Ventura's return, after she had built her international career with the Comédie-Française. In January, Bulfinsky was assigned to appear alongside her in two plays: Shaw's Saint Joan and Henri Bernstein's Le Secret. Saint Joan was premiered in February. According to reviewers, Bulfinsky as Pierre Cauchon did a better role than Ventura, who was an imperfect Joan of Arc. Bernstein's work was better received, with both Ventura and Bulfinsky praised as part of a coherent ensemble—though the text itself was viewed as lengthy and boring. The new TNB season opened in September 1926 with Hebbel's Judith. As Herz notes, it was a fine production, bringing together Voiculescu's "excellent psychological nuances" and Bulfinsky's "statuesque attitudes".

== 1926 TNB schism ==
Bulfinsky resigned from the TNB in October 1926, shortly after that institution had refused to confirm his tenure. Days later, he announced that he was creating a new troupe alongside Macri and her writer husband, Victor Eftimiu, and that he would appear as The Devil in Eftimiu's own Cocoșul negru. He had reconciled with the TNB by late November, when he was doing new shows with Judith (this time, alongside Sorana Țopa) and The Taming of the Shrew. Șeicaru was again impressed by Bulfinsky as Cutler Walpole, the embodiment of "brutal simplicity" in The Doctor's Dilemma, done from Shaw's text at the TNB. Herz also praised him for his "commanding presence" as old Duval in The Lady of the Camellias, by Dumas fils. Consensus was split, with critic Emil Cerbu arguing that the play was "pretentious and declamatory", and that the actors, Bulfinsky included, had little room to improve on that aspect. He obtained good reviews for Luigi Pirandello's Henry IV, where he was The Doctor (in February 1927). The "massive, strong" actor was well-liked by Iosif Nădejde in Biruitorul, done from a text by Vintilă Russu-Șirianu and Alexandru Băbeanu. Nădejde adds that the play was "warmly received" by TNB spectators.

In early August 1927, Bulfinsky handed in his resignation from the TNB, joining Mișu Fotino in reviving Teatrul Mic as their own company. They opened with Vasilescu-Valjean's political comedy, Fata Morgana, which featured both managers alongside Ciucurescu. Valjean himself was enthusiastic: "Mr. R. Bulfinsky is wonderful as the infatuated minister." The other premiere was Ladislas Fodor's Dr. Juci Szabó, which had Filotti and Bulfinsky as leads (according to journalist Aida Vrioni, they were a good match, even though the role was out of Bulfinsky's range). They followed up with Ginerele d-lui Prefect, a farce of foreign origin (ultimately based on Der Herr Senator, by Franz von Schönthan and Gustav Kadelburg), localized by Gusty. According to Froda, it was "rather cheap", but also enjoyable, with Bulfinsky and Fotino's "whimsical acting [sweeping] spectators into the most impossible situations, causing them to lose touch with reality".

Bulfinsky in 1929

Filmmaker Gabriel Rosca employed Bulfinsky, Ciucurescu and Leny Caler in his international project, Le Chemin de la rémission, completed during late 1927. One scene was filmed outside Cișmigiu Gardens, and had Bulfinsky's character dying in Ciucurescu's arms; director Marin Iorda, who did his apprenticeship with the crew, recalls being stunned that she shed real tears. Teatrul Mic had Romuald in Au premier de ces messieurs, by Yves Mirande and André Mouëzy-Éon. As Cerbu observes, it broke the boulevardier convention with its "strange subject"—with Bulfinsky as the only troupe member to understand its "Pirandellian" depths. Ambiguity was preserved in the next production, which was Rudolf Bernauer and Rudolf Österreicher's Der Garten Eden. Critic H. Lazu, who noted the play's sexual suggestiveness, was nevertheless impressed by "scenes that admirably blend the tragedy of the momentary denouement with the generic situational comedy." Lazu panned Antonia, by Melchior Lengyel, observing that Bulfinsky was demeaning himself with lowbrow humor, unexplainably screaming, drinking real champagne on stage, and breaking glasses. This verdict was contrasted by Prodan: "Mr. R. Bulfinsky played the role of a drunken Transylvanian with the skill of a fine artist."

The Bulfinsky–Fotino collaboration lasted only until 1928. He was again at the TNB in February 1928, appearing in Ventura's celebrated Lorenzaccio; according to Froda, he acted on the same level as René Alexandre. In March, Bulfinsky had a role in Gib Mihăescu's tragedy, Pavilionul cu umbre; according to Cerbu, he "managed to give the ideology of his role—as 'the man who wanted to kill sin'—the vibrant force of a real life". The female lead was Ventura, to whom the play had been presented as an homage. It was reported in Rampa as "a great triumph" for both actors. In May, he was a mythomaniacal French colonist in Bernard Zimmer's Bava l'Africain, with Macri playing the woman who worships him. Later that month, Iorga premiered his play about Cleopatra, with Țopa as the titular queen. While applauded by Herz as a triumph for both the writer and the actors, it was panned by Ion Dimitrescu of Curentul; he reported that, "apart from Mr. Bulfinski, who was impressive in the role of an old priest, the play was a lamentable performance."

== Church Mouse period ==
The TNB opened its 1928–1929 season with a big production of Carlo Gozzi's Turandot, using Bulfinsky as Tartaglia—as noted by Eftimiu, this experiment in commedia dell'arte showcased his "vast resources" for humor. Gusty directed him and Marioara Zimniceanu in Much Ado About Nothing, but, as Cerbu argues, unexplainably hindered their talents by treating the play too seriously. During November and December, he appeared as a ham-acting Nero in Mircea Dem. Rădulescu's Petronius. The play was disliked by Cerbu, who argued that the only moment counting as action was a scene where Bulfinsky and Țopa "yell at each other, trying to convince themselves that they have temperament."

In 1929, Bulfinsky earned accolades as John the Terrible in Sorbul's Letopiseți, mounted by Soare at the TNB. Also that year, he recorded with Filotti for the national radio company, with Ce știa satul. From February 1930, he was Lorgenef in Les Amants de Paris, by Pierre Frondaie. Nădejde enjoyed his study in brutality, "a unitary creation, start-to-finish." In tandem, he worked under contract with Ventura's own troupe, doing Fodor's Church Mouse. The premiere, with Maria of Yugoslavia in attendance, garnered "thunderous applause". After Les Amants de Paris ended its run on 25 February, Bulfinsky only did Fodor's play, with daily shows at Ventura's. It was unanimously acclaimed by critics of the day as the year's funniest comedy, and as a major triumph for Bulfinsky, for his co-star Caler, as well as for director Victor Ion Popa. The play was also selected as the opening one of the 1930–1931 season, after other projects had been abandoned by Ventura. From October, Bulfinsky appeared as the sentimental business tycoon in Bernstein's Félix, sharing acclaim with Caler and Silvia Fulda.

In January 1931, the state radio company aired O nuntă la țară, by Emanuel Antonescu, done by a TNB cast. Other roles were played by Mia Cottescu, Nicolae Brancomir, and Ion Finteșteanu; George Mihail Zamfirescu was director. At Ventura's company, he enjoyed success, again alongside Caler, in Barry Conners' Roxy; with Ventura herself, he did Saint-Georges de Bouhélier's Carnaval des enfants, noted by writer I. Valerian for the warmth he poured into his acting. In April 1931, Popa staged a version of Edward Childs Carpenter's Bab, but there was a noted ebbing in public interest. The reviewer at Ordinea newspaper remarked that the play was too similar to Roxy, and that Bulfinsky and Caler were doing roles that exactly matched their previous work in Church Mouse.

In May 1931, Ventura and Popa staged Isaia Răcăciuni's Poste-restante, with Aura Buzescu and George Vraca as the leads. The play was panned, but Bulfinsky was acclaimed in his supporting role, to which he added (as Valerian observes) "the impetuosity of his temperament". On 15 May, the company premiered Léopold Marchand's Balthazar; according to a columnist at Cuvântul, the play was simplistic but "insufficiently studied": most actors, Bulfinsky included, fumbled their lines. He ended his contract with Ventura later that month, when he made his TNB comeback. During the summer break, he visited Czechoslovakia and Weimar Germany, spending some time in Berlin. He reported his amazement at seeing "elegant folk everywhere, the most luxurious automobiles, all theaters and cinemas packed to capacity, and not a single open table to be found in the cafes and restaurants", expressing mistrust in official narratives about the effects of the Great Depression in Germany.

Scene from Church Mouse, as staged in February 1930 by Victor Ion Popa and Maria Ventura company; with Bulfinsky (on the far left) and Leny Caler

== Depression-era projects ==
Bulfinsky's return to Bucharest happened to coincide with an early wave of the Great Depression in Romania. By early 1932, despite efforts by manager Alexandru Mavrodi, the troupe was taking massive pay cuts. Bulfinsky was again Sir Toby in a reprisal of the Twelfth Night; Tantzi Cutava was Maria, while Marietta Anca debuted as Olivia. On that day, journalist Tudor Teodorescu-Braniște welcomed his performance as displaying "the same good-natured, rich, generous, and communicative humor with which he had accustomed his admirers for so many years." In November 1931, he was in Henry Bataille's Maman Colibri—seen by the columnist at Ordinea as an outdated text, only salvaged by Bulfinsky and Voiculescu's acting. Gusty used him as Satin in The Lower Depths, with an all-star cast (including Ciprian as The Actor, Finteșteanu as The Baron, and Grigore Calboreanu as Luka). In tandem, Bulfinsky was again Claudius and Macduff, as well as Iorga's Neagoe Basarab; at Mavrodi's Academy of Theatrical Studies, where he also lectured, he was directed by Soare (leading in Friedrich Schiller's Intrigue and Love), and impressed the public for his secondary role in The Idiot, adapted by Arcadiu Baculea from Fyodor Dostoevsky. In April 1934, the TNB tested out Eftimiu's new play, Daniela. Dem. Theodorescu deemed it a "catastrophe" that could not be rescued by "that studious diligence of that long-suffering Bulfinski".

For the 1932–1933 TNB season, Victor Bumbești took up Eftimiu's local classic, Înșir'te mărgărite; Bulfinsky was The White Emperor. The season, which was heavily affected by budget cuts, closed with Vasile Alecsandri's Fântâna Blanduziei (directed by Bumbești, and with Bulfinsky as Scaurus) and with Iorga's Moartea lui Asur (with Soare directing, and Bulfinsky as one of the background figures). He also worked with Ventura's company, starring, opposite Caler, in Shaw's Pygmalion—adapted by Soare and Mircea Eliade. As noted by Massoff, Bulfinsky was "impressive [and] stunning" in another Ventura–Soare show, which opened in 1933. This was A. Pop Marțian's stage version of Irène Némirovsky's novel, David Golder, with Bulfinsky as the titular character. Critic Dragoș Protopopescu appreciated the "convincing spectacle", but thought that Bulfinsky had too readily accepted directorial indications that he always be agitated and shouting his lines. As Protopopescu argued: "with more mercy for his nerves and ours, his overwhelming David Golder will endure as an unforgettable mask and one of the greatest creations of a great artist."

In 1933–1934, Bulfinsky was cast in a TNB production of Bernstein's Samson. From November 1933, the same company staged Campo di Maggio, with Soare called in to direct. The play had been co-written by Giovacchino Forzano and Benito Mussolini; Bulfinsky was Napoleon. Reviewer Claudia Millian argued that he was unable to convince spectators, since he did not look the part; as Massoff observes, he "resembled il Duce more than the Emperor". During early 1934, he was distinguished as a supporting actor in the TNB's Richard III, with the titular character played by either Ciprian or Manolescu; in tandem, he had a small role in Eftimiu's Ploaia de aur (which flopped, though his performance met with approval). He was cast by Ion Șahighian in Iuda, from a text by Ciprian and Ion Luca, and appeared in W. Somerset Maugham's Circle (directed by Vasile Enescu). In March 1934, he was doing "experimental theater conferences", alongside Ion Marin Sadoveanu. He appeared in blackface, doing fragments from Othello; author Paul Sterian gave these a poor review: while the text called for an intimate and psychological performance, Bulfinsky worked with wailing and destroying props.

In October 1934, Sandu Teleajen premiered his rural-themed Moșnenii. It was panned by Ion Dimitrescu as a "declamatory" work, though the same columnist remarked Bulfinsky as one of the peasants, "with an instinct for silence and the steadfastness of the countryside". During the early months of 1935, he and Zimniceanu toured the provinces with Shaw's Widowers' Houses. After the TNB's season break of summer 1935, he returned with a small role in Neamul Șoimăreștilor. A historical play done by Sorbul and Mihail Sadoveanu, it was generally unsuccessful. Instead, Bulfinsky was beloved in Sil-Vara's Mädchenjahre einer Königin, where he played Leopold of Belgium, again under Soare's direction. He also drew moderate praise, opposite Voiculescu and others, in Bernstein's Les Flambeaux.

== First retirement and SCITA ==
During the 1935–1936 season, the TNB opened with Widowers' Houses, but, as Massoff notes, it failed to bring in spectators. The same company followed up with Soare and Traian Cornescu's adaptation of Penthesilea, by Heinrich von Kleist, in which he was Ulysses. It is described by Massoff as a "daring" show that explored "the depths of tragedy", but also one which exhausted its stage technicians due to its constantly moving settings. In September 1935, the Soare–Cornescu team followed up with a five-hour performance, combining Henry IV, Part 1 and Part 2. Bulfinsky registered a major triumph with his Falstaff; as Massoff recalls, he played the part "with comedic verve, but without trivializing it." In December 1936, the TNB and Gusty put on Ruy Blas, as a commemorative show honoring Victor Hugo; Bulfinsky again earned distinction, as Don César. Gusty also used him in Henrik Ibsen's Enemy of the People, the first-ever complete Romanian staging of that play. During February 1936, the TNB premiered Alexandru Kirițescu's Borgia, with another grandiose production by Soare and Cornescu. Though the play was critically acclaimed (and Bulfinsky was well-liked as Pope Alexander VI), ticket sales were unusually low.

In 1936, Bulfinsky formally retired, as a TNB pensioner. He still worked sporadically, appearing (opposite Caler, Beate Fredanov and Emil Botta) in crowd-pleasers such as Dodie Smith's Call It a Day—all done by Comedia Theater, under Soare's direction, in September 1936. He suffered a personal loss in December, when his son Mircea shot himself following a romantic heartbreak. According to Ciucurescu, during the 1920s the family had lost its sizable fortune. Much of it went to her and Romuald's son-in-law, Avram Nicolau, who was trying to set up a theatrical company in Timișoara. In 1937, the Bulfinsky family was occupying a large house on Antim Street, in Dealul Spirii neighborhood. Bulfinsky jokingly remarked that it was within a "Latin Quarter", noting that neighbors included literary and theatrical professionals such as Sorbul, Horia Furtună, and Mihail Sebastian.

Advertisement for Sándor Hunyady's Két pofon, as produced by Sică Alexandrescu in 1939; featuring Bulfinsky and Gheorghe Timică

Ladislas Fodor's success with the Romanian public waned in January 1937, when Comedia tested the public with Fodor's Love Is Not So Simple, under Sică Alexandrescu's direction. Dimitrescu, who reports that spectators left the hall, called it a mix "of gynecological physiology and false sentimentalism", with the few enjoyable moments provided by Bulfinsky and Silvia Fulda. The former continued to do background roles for Alexandrescu, including in Paul Armont's Ces messieurs de la Santé, which had Ion Iancovescu as the star. In one comment of the period, Iancovescu mocked the TNB managers for having pushed his colleague into retirement, "only for them to come crawling back to him after a year of successes with private touring companies". Critic Gheorghe Nenișor proposed that Alexandrescu had managed to obtain success, and to outstage the TNB, but only by "sacrificing [Bulfinsky's] personality" with trifling roles.

In September 1937, Bulfinsky appeared at Comedia as a leading member of SCITA Company, which had been masterminded by Alexandrescu as a new itinerant troupe. SCITA was then hosted by Regina Maria Theater, with an adaptation of The Brothers Karamazov, with Bulfinsky as Fyodor and Fory Etterle as an acclaimed Smerdyakov. A pseudonymous note in Bilete de Papagal proposed that the two of them were also the only ones to have actually read Dostoevsky: "The proof lies in the false, somewhat French atmosphere in which the play is performed—despite its deeply Russian substance." In December, under contract with Aurel Ion Maican and the Bucharest Free Theater, Bulfinsky starred with Filotti in Henri Jeanson's comedy, Amis comme avant. At Regina Maria, he seconded Bulandra and his wife Lucia in Alexandrescu's production of an Edith Ellis melodrama, The Lady of La Paz. During 1938–1939, SCITA produced Henri-René Lenormand's Les Ratés. Columnist Nicolae Carandino found the play to be questionably directed by Soare, but reserved praise for some members of the cast, including Bulfinsky as Larnaudy. SCITA also employed director Mikhail Muratov for another variant of The Lower Depths, done at Regina Maria. Bulfinsky was involved in the highly successful production—but now appeared as Luka.

From at least 1932, Ciucurescu had been severely ill with gout, which had left her partly disabled. Romuald was a widower from February 1939, when the TNB rehearsals were interrupted as a posthumous homage to Ciucurescu. For the 1939–1940 season, which coincided with the start of World War II, Bulfinsky had a secondary role in A. de Herz's comedy, Păianjenul, as taken up by Comedia and SCITA; Soare was the director, while the two leads were Caler and Vraca. During October 1939, Alexandrescu was producing Sándor Hunyady's Két pofon; featuring Bulfinsky and Gheorghe Timică as a comedic duo, it was reportedly greatly enjoyed by the public.

== Antonescu years and The Barașeum ==
Though Romania kept neutral, it moved closer to Nazi Germany and the Axis powers under the Gigurtu cabinet; in July, the country also had to accept the Soviet occupation of Bessarabia and northern Bukovina, but only with displays of national mourning—which also put the theatrical season on hold. When the order was rescinded, Bulfinsky could perform in the open-air stage at Comedia. Here, Șahighian directed him, Etterle and Marietta Sadova in La Banque Nemo, by Louis Verneuil. Bulfinsky worked with various private companies for the entire duration of the war. One of these was Filotti's own Sărindar Theater—where, in April 1941, he had a supporting role in Guglielmo Giannini's Eva in vetrina. He moved on to the Alb și Negru company, which managed to recruit him that June. The new venue premiered with a musical play done from texts by Carlo Roggero—directed by Soare, and with Bulfinsky in a supporting role. He was still touring with Eva in vetrina, performing at Sibiu Municipal Theater in November 1941. Though he was no longer with the company in December, Sărindar's posters continued to announce him as starring in Nicola Manzari's Città senza avvocati. Pro-Nazi policies had by then been more fully embraced by Ion Antonescu's military dictatorship, which also engaged Romania on the Eastern Front. During early 1943, Bulfinsky reprised his Petruchio role for Muncă și Lumină company, whose director, Victor Ion Popa, wished to familiarize a working-class public with the classics.

Bulfinsky in 1942

Bulfinsky was also touring provincial towns on his own, with an Othello recital. According to Duminica weekly, it was a great success, and should have naturally obtained him a permanent studio at the TNB, where he could continue to perform small productions for a select public. In June 1943, the TNB welcomed him back for a premiere of Artturi Järviluoma's Pohjalaisia, as well as for a new take on The Merry Wives of Windsor, again as Falstaff. With a modesty that was noted by the columnist at Acțiunea newspaper, Bulfinsky thanked management for the opportunity, adding: "there is much to be learned in the sheer proximity of great authors, and I am glad whenever, despite my age, I am offered the opportunity to become a student." By October, he was doing voice acting on national radio, headlining its production of Paul I. Prodan's Adevăratul Cristodulo. During November, he was again at Sărindar, performing in Edward Sheldon's Romance; Acțiunea described him as unlikeable in that role, and the play itself as "too big for the Sărindar stage". In March 1944, he signed a new contract with Comedia and Alexandrescu.

The political situation was drastically changed by an anti-fascist coup in August 1944, itself closely followed by a Soviet occupation of Romania. The democratizing Sănătescu cabinet made Eftimiu its Chief of Theaters, with a ceremony that was attended by Bulfinsky, Alexandrescu, Storin, Voiculescu, and other major figures of the stage. The Bulandra troupe, reformed as the "Municipal Theater", had him in Eftimiu's own Omul care a văzut moartea, opposite Maximilian and Radu Beligan. They garnered rave reviews from columnists of the day, with Nicolae Argintescu-Amza noting that they had eliminated all excesses that had been allowed in previous stagings of that play. According to a review in Ultima Oră daily, "Mr. R. Bulfinski as the pharmacist [creates] one of the most successful 'character types' in all of recent theater." Late that year, he was acclaimed as Mayor Orden in John Steinbeck's The Moon Is Down, adapted by Sebastian for The Barașeum. In the new social context, Bulfinsky joined the Romanian Society for Friendship with the Soviet Union; addressing its other members in February 1945, he upheld the virtues of Soviet actors, adding: "Let us also follow the example of our great, heroic colleagues and neighbors, and put our art at the service of the masses, at the service of the country, at the service of democracy, at the service of a sincere friendship with the USSR."

During the second leg of the 1944–1945 season, Bulfinsky was touring Romania with Manasse. It was staged by his own ad-hoc troupe, which comprised a number of young actors (Erna Albu was Roza Blum, and Gioni Dimitriu was Ghiță). At The Barașeum, the returning senior actor had a small but decisive role in Marcel Achard's La Vie est belle. Journalist Ruxandra Oteteleșanu viewed this production as emblematic for Bulfinsky's evolution as an artist:

Mr. Bulfinsky is one of the few actors who create a unique mask and an appropriate vocal register for each individual role. He does not indulge in the lazy acting style of those who content themselves with merely filling the stage with their own personality, ticks, or verve, but instead crafts the character personally. He dives so deeply into his own personality that he reaches that universally valid truth—which is the seed of any creation when it comes to life, plastically so.

== TNC comeback and final retirement ==
A year later, Comedia Theater staged Jean Anouilh's Restless Heart, with Bulfinsky again applauded as a supporting character. In July 1964, Filotti's troupe cast him in another small role, in Alexander Ostrovsky's Mad Money—with Dinu Negreanu directing. He was also part of the supporting cast in Filotti and Fernando de Crucciatti's production of Non ti pago, originally by Eduardo De Filippo. In October, the same company had him as the calm and wise doctor in Henri Bernstein's Mélo, supporting leads A. Pop Marțian and Mimi Botta. Also then, the Bucharest Savoy premiered an adaptation of John Knittel's Via Mala, with the main roles going to Bulfinsky, Storin, and Geo Barton.

During early 1947, Bulfinsky was working with Bucharest's Teatrul Victoriei, appearing as Patrick Murphy in Anne Nichols' Abie's Irish Rose. Dramatist Eugen Părăianu, who reviewed the premiere, was unimpressed, arguing that Bulfinsky and other senior cast members were "nothing but poorly disguised guests at a neighborhood masquerade ball." He was also appearing in a new version of Mädchenjahre einer Königin when the new Minister of the Arts, Ion Pas, appointed him chairman of his original workplace, the TNC, with his mandate officially beginning on 27 February 1947. In an interview, he announced that he intended to use up as much of the budget as he could, with an international and "eclectic" program that would have included modern Russian and American plays, local classics such as Bujoreștii and Thebaida, and new plays by Oltenian authors. In August 1947, he was made Knight First Class of Meritul Cultural, by the King of Romania, Michael I.

Bulfinsky's stint at the TNC witnessed the full imposition of a Romanian communist regime in early 1948. Just days after, a trade unions' commission (presided upon by Maican and Maximilian), staged qualification exams for the TNC staff. Stage director Traian Ciuculescu was singled out for having failed to answer basic questions about his craft. In May 1948, Scînteia newspaper observed that the closing TNC season had been a disparate collection of classical plays (Molière's The Miser), "plays that are critical of the old regime" (Kirițescu's Gaițele), and samples "of contemporary-progressive writing for the stage" (Arnaud d'Usseau and James Gow's Deep Are the Roots). The paper also criticized Bulfinsky for still tolerating Mircea Ștefănescu's comedy, Micul infern, despite it being a "dangerous [...] eulogy to bourgeois family life."

Bulfinsky resigned from the TNC at some point in September 1948, and Marin Iorda, formerly of the TNI, was brought in to replace him. The aging actor fully retired from active life during his final months. In August 1951, the official press informed that he was to receive a new state pension, alongside the families of actor Constantin Tănase and painter Nicolae Tonitza; since they had "sustained themselves through sacrifices during the era of bourgeois-landowner domination, [they will] now receive official assistance from the Republic." Bulfinsky died in Bucharest on 13 January 1953, after a short illness. Migry Avram Nicolau, who was his granddaughter, was by then acquiring her own notoriety as an operetta singer.
