= Vinnette Justine Carroll =

American actress and playwright (1922–2002)

- Carroll in All in the Family, 1976
- Born: March 11, 1922; New York City, U.S.
- Died: November 5, 2002 (aged 80); Lauderhill, Florida, U.S.
- Education: Wadleigh High School; Long Island University (B.A.); New York University (M.A.); Columbia University (Ph.D. candidate)
- Occupations: Playwright actress theatre director
- Known for: The first African-American woman to direct on Broadway

Vinnette Justine Carroll (March 11, 1922 – November 5, 2002) was an American playwright, actress, and theatre director. She was the first African-American woman to direct on Broadway, with her 1972 production of the musical Don't Bother Me, I Can't Cope. Until Liesl Tommy's 2016 nomination for Eclipsed, Carroll was the only African-American woman to have received a Tony Award nomination for direction.

== Life and work ==
Carroll was born in New York City to Edgar Edgerton, a dentist, and Florence (Morris) Carroll. She moved to Jamaica with her family at the age of three, and spent much of her childhood there. Brought back to New York at the age of 10, she and her two sisters were the only black students at their New York public school. Her mother was a strong presence who played Arturo Toscanini in the home and disciplined her three daughters wisely. Her father encouraged his daughters to become physicians. Carroll compromised by studying psychology.

She left the field of psychology to study theater, and in 1948 accepted a scholarship to attend Erwin Piscator’s Dramatic Workshop at the New School for Social Research. There, she studied with Lee Strasberg, Stella Adler, Margaret Barker, and Susan Steele.

Carroll later founded the Urban Arts Corps, a nonprofit, interracial community theater where, as artistic director, she was able to provide a professional workshop for aspiring young actors in underserved communities. She produced over 100 plays through the Urban Arts Corps from her loft theatre on West 20th Street in Manhattan. The theater was a member of the Black Theater Alliance and the Off-Off Broadway Alliance, and was supported by the New York State Council on the Arts, the National Endowment of the Arts, the Edward Noble Foundation, and CBS. Urban Arts Corps productions included Don't Bother Me, I Can't Cope, Jean-Paul Sartre'sThe Flies, and William Hanley's Slow Dance on a Killing Ground, among many others. The theater provided a space to "nurture emerging playwrights and showcase their works."

In 1968, Carroll joined the New York State Council on the Arts upon the request of executive director John B. Hightower. She had previously been appointed director of the Ghetto Arts Program for the State of New York.

== Education ==
Carroll attended Wadleigh High School, an integrated high school in Harlem, Manhattan. She then received her Bachelor of Arts degree from Long Island University in 1944. In 1946, she received her Master of Arts degree from New York University. She was a Ph.D. candidate at Columbia University, but decided not to finish the psychology degree and instead to pursue a career in acting. Psychology, while not her chosen profession, was a tool she found invaluable in working with people. She began studying theatre at the New School for Social Research in 1946, where she aspired to become an actress. She also studied in the fields of clinical and industrial psychology, and was awarded a scholarship to do postgraduate work at the New School for Social Research in 1948.

Her philosophy of directing and her technique for creating her folk plays reflect similar theories, ideas, and aesthetic principles to those of Bertolt Brecht. She also promoted the principles of Erwin Piscator's "objective style of performance". After working with Piscator, she studied at Strasberg's studio between 1948 and 1950. The juxtaposition of these opposing styles led to Carroll's own technique in creating her new style of folk drama.

== Acting career ==
Carroll's first stage appearance was at the New School for Social Research in 1948. She performed in many of the school's productions, including roles as Clytemnestra in Agamemnon, the Nurse in Romeo and Juliet, and the Duchess in Alice in Wonderland. Carroll made her professional stage debut as a Christian in a summer stock production of George Bernard Shaw's Androcles and the Lion at the Southold Playhouse on Long Island. She played Addie in Lillian Hellman's The Little Foxes and then, in 1949, Bella in Arnaud d'Ussaeu and James Gow's Deep Are the Roots.

In 1955, Carroll joined the faculty of the Performing Arts High School in New York City. She taught theater arts and directed productions as a faculty member at the high school for 11 years. Later, due to a shortage of faculty positions, Carroll created a one-woman show and toured the United States and the West Indies until 1957.

She made her London stage debut at the Royal Court Theatre on December 4, 1958, as Sophia Adams in Moon on a Rainbow Shawl. She then won an Obie Award for her role in Errol John’s Moon on a Rainbow Shawl. In February 1963, she returned to London as the Narrator in Black Nativity at the Piccadilly Theatre. Carroll also worked in film and television. She appeared in the films Up the Down Staircase (1967), Alice's Restaurant (1969), and others. In 1976, she played a memorable role as Dr. Wynell Thatcher on the two-part All in the Family episode "Archie's Operation." She later appeared in The Last Home Run, which was filmed in 1996 and released in 1998. In 1964, she received an Emmy Award for Beyond the Blues, which dramatized the works of Black poets. She later returned to London with her company and performed in Peter Wessel Zapffe'sThe Prodigal Son.

== As a playwright and director ==
During her era, Carroll was one of the few women directing in commercial theatre. She worked to develop a new form of theater, "the gospel song-play", to capture the richness and variety of life through music, theater, and dance. In 1957, she formed her first all-black cast to present Howard Richardson and William Berney's Dark of the Moon at the Harlem YMCA. The second production of Dark of the Moon launched the careers of several young African-American actors, including James Earl Jones, Shauneille Perry, and Harold Scott.

In 1972, she became the first African-American woman to direct on Broadway with her staging of Don't Bother Me, I Can't Cope. The hit gospel revue was conceived by Carroll, with music and lyrics by Micki Grant. It was nominated for four Tony Awards. In 1976, she collaborated with Grant and Alex Bradford on Your Arms Too Short to Box with God, which garnered three Tony nominations. This show was an adaptation of the Gospel According to Matthew.

Carroll did not dwell on her role as a female director because she felt it would be self-defeating. Through her effort and talent, she provided communities with illustrations of unity through her productions. Her contributions as an artist and playwright are often overlooked. However, she is known for the reinvention of song-play, which was revitalized in many of her theater works. The expression of identity through gospel music in the African-American theater experience is clearly delineated in the development of song-play. Her work was about the reaffirmation of life and people. Common stereotypes of African Americans led Carroll "into creating and directing new works that positively and artistically presented people of color in theater and art." Her primary interest was giving voice to African Americans and other minority communities that have been culturally and artistically silenced. Carroll once said of her career: "They told me that I had one-third less chance because I was a woman; they told me I had one-third less chance again because I was black, but I tell you, I did one hell of a lot with that remaining one-third."

== Retirement and death ==
Carroll moved to Fort Lauderdale, Florida, during the 1980s. There, she founded the Vinnette Carroll Repertory Company, where she remained as artistic director and producer until her failing health forced her to retire in 2001. She died of heart disease and diabetes in Lauderhill, Florida, on November 5, 2002, at the age of 80.

== Plays ==
- Agamemnon (1948)
- The Little Foxes (1948)
- Deep Are the Roots (1949)
- Caesar and Cleopatra (1950)
- A Streetcar Named Desire (1956)
- The Grass Harp (1956)
- Small War on Murray Hill (1957)
- The Crucible (1958)
- Moon on a Rainbow Shawl (1958)
- Jolly's Progress (1959)
- The Octoroon (1961)
- Moon on a Rainbow Shawl (1962)
- Black Nativity (1963)
- The Prodigal Son (1965)

== Directing credits ==
- The Prodigal Son (1965)
- Black Nativity (1961)
- Don't Bother Me, I Can't Cope (1972)
- Desire Under the Elms (1974)
- Your Arms Too Short to Box with God (1976)
- But Never Jam Today (1979)

== See also ==
- List of African-American firsts
