= Richard Becker (music publisher) =

American music publisher (1934–2025)

- Other name: Richard Stanley Becker
- Education: University of Miami
- Occupation: Music Publisher

Richard Stanley Becker (November 9, 1934 – November 28, 2025) was an American music publisher who gave rise to major innovations within the recording industry, most notably with The Beatles (Anna Go To Him) and The Rolling Stones (You Better Move On).

Becker's work and collaborations have received wide recognition, ranging from Tony Awards and nominations for his show, to inclusion in the collections of some of the world's most prestigious libraries, and even the dedication of a park bench in New York City's Gramercy Park. Becker is also well known for his promotion work and his ability to launch new talent, so much so that he has often been referred to as a "star maker." Throughout his career, Becker has encouraged musical development in young people, as shown in his 1976 establishment of the Richard S. Becker Scholarship at the Juilliard School of Music.

== Career ==
Becker's earliest major work was with Pat Boone on the #1 hit "Moody River". His work with The Beatles on "Anna (Go To Him)" and The Rolling Stones ("You Better Move On") not only brought forward the Muscle Shoals Sound for the first time, but also produced the first crossover hit from R&B to pop.

Among his other collaborations, Becker worked with a team to adapt gospel music to Broadway. This team initially included Alex Bradford, on a production commissioned by the Italian government for Gian-Carlo Menotti's Two Worlds Festival held in Spoleto, Italy, entitled "Black Nativity". The show, based on the play by Langston Hughes, proved such a success that two years later, the group was asked to do another production. The result was Your Arms Too Short to Box with God.

The Tony Award-winning production of Your Arms Too Short to Box with God became the first show fully funded in its production by the Ford's Theater in Washington, D.C.. President Jimmy Carter chose Your Arms as the first show presented by his administration Your Arms went on to enjoy a lengthy run at Broadway's Lyceum Theater, and is one of the only shows to experience two revivals in four years. Your Arms gave rise to Tony Award-nominated Performances (Al Green), reinvigorated the career of Patti LaBelle, and showcased the professional debut of Jennifer Holiday. Your Arms has influenced more than music - for example, the prominent televangelist James Dobson makes frequent reference to the musical and devoted an entire section to its influence in one of his best selling books.

Becker has worked with many genres over the course of his career. For example, he was responsible for bringing the first country music show to New York City's Madison Square Garden in 1964.

Many of Becker's works have been included in many collections. Some examples are his inclusion for his popular records (including Pat Boone and The Beatles) in Collier's and the Encyclopædia Britannica. In addition, Becker's work with Alex Bradford has been included in James Weldon Johnson's private collection at the Beinecke Library at Yale University, his own submission of the Richard S. Becker music collection at the Beinecke, the Richard S. Becker collection of Alex Bradford Gospel Music Materials Archives at the Smithsonian National Museum of American History and many of his songs (such as "Anna", "Moody River" and "You Better Move On") are featured within the collections of The British Library.

Becker has worked with a wide range of people. In the 1980s, he collaborated with astrologer Jeane Dixon and one of her songs was recorded by The Chuck Wagon Gang.

== Education ==
- University of Miami
- Currently President of Richie Becker's Music, Inc and Blue Pearl Music, Inc.

== Significant creative works ==
- Moody River, Recorded by Pat Boone – became the Number 1 song in the nation, 1961
- Moody River rerecorded by Frank Sinatra on the Cycles album - a gold record award, 1969
- Anna (Go to Him), recorded by The Beatles – a million-selling album, 1963
- You Better Move On, recorded by The Rolling Stones on the December's Children album – a gold record album, 1966 and rerecorded by Dean Martin, 1974
- Manager, Alex Bradford star of Broadway show, Don't Bother Me, I Can't Cope, 1975, published musical Your Arms Too Short to Box with God, 1975
- Director first country music show in history, Madison Square Garden, 1964

Works included within:

- The Richard S. Becker Collection of Alex Bradford Collection in Rock and Roll Hall of Fame and Museum, Colliers Yearbook. 1961, Britannica, The Bienecke Library, Yale University, The British Library.

== Awards ==
- Recipient Broadcast Music Award 1961
- Key to City Memphis 1973
- Arkansas Traveler Award 1973
- Honorary Citizen Tennessee 1973
- Honorary Lieutenant Colonel aide-de-camp George Wallace 1973
- Alex Bradford Memorial Music Scholarship Spelman College 1996
- Richard S. Becker collection of Alex Bradford Gospel.
- Music Material Archives Collection at Smithsonian National Museum of American History

== Memberships ==
- The Friars Club
