= 27th Tony Awards =

1973 US theatrical awards ceremony

- Date: March 25, 1973
- Location: Imperial Theatre, New York City, New York
- Hosted by: Rex Harrison, Celeste Holm, Sandy Duncan and Jerry Orbach
- Most wins: A Little Night Music (6)
- Most nominations: A Little Night Music (12)

Television/radio coverage
- Network: ABC

The 27th Annual Tony Awards ceremony was held on March 25, 1973, at the Imperial Theatre in New York City, and broadcast by ABC television. Hosts were Rex Harrison, Celeste Holm and co-hosts were Sandy Duncan and Jerry Orbach.

== Eligibility ==
Shows that opened on Broadway during the 1972–1973 season before March 14, 1973 are eligible.

Original plays

- All the Girls Came Out to Play
- Butley
- The Changing Room
- The Creation of the World and Other Business
- Elizabeth I
- Enemies
- The Enemy is Dead
- An Evening With Richard Nixon and...
- Finishing Touches
- 42 Seconds from Broadway
- The Jockey Club Stakes
- The Last of Mrs. Lincoln
- Let Me Hear You Smile
- The Lincoln Mask
- Look Away
- No Sex Please, We're British
- Out Cry
- Promenade, All!
- Ring Round the Bathtub
- The Secret Affairs of Mildred Wild
- 6 Rms Riv Vu
- Status Quo Vadis
- The Sunshine Boys
- That Championship Season
- Tough to Get Help
- Voices
- Warp!

Original musicals

- Ambassador
- Dear Oscar
- Different Times
- Don't Bother Me, I Can't Cope
- Don't Play Us Cheap
- Dude
- From Israel with Love
- Hard Job Being God
- Heathen!
- Hurry, Harry
- Jacques Brel Is Alive and Well and Living in Paris
- A Little Night Music
- Mother Earth
- Pacific Paradise
- Pippin
- Shelter
- Sugar
- That's Entertainment
- Tricks
- Via Galactica

Play revivals

- Captain Brassbound's Conversion
- The Crucible
- Don Juan
- The Great God Brown
- The Little Black Book
- Lysistrata
- Don Juan in Hell
- Medea
- The Merchant of Venice
- Mourning Becomes Electra
- Much Ado About Nothing
- The Plough and the Stars

Musical revivals

- Irene
- Lost in the Stars
- Man of La Mancha
- Purlie

== The ceremony ==
The ceremony opened with a song-and-dance medley performed by Gwen Verdon, Paula Kelly, Helen Gallagher and Donna McKechnie.

The theme was the global reach of Broadway. The "Wide World of Broadway" featured narrations by Rex Harrison, Walter Slezak, Rossano Brazzi, Yul Brynner and Peter Ustinov, who brought the viewers to: Vienna: West Side Story; Tokyo: The King and I; Milan: Ciao, Rudy; Paris: Hello, Dolly!; London: Show Boat; Zagreb, Yugoslavia: Man of La Mancha; and Wichita Falls, Texas: My Fair Lady.

Musicals represented:

- Pippin ("Magic To Do"- Ben Vereen and Company)

A new series of awards was started this year, termed "Theater Awards '73", renewable annually.

This was the fourth time that Julie Harris won a Tony Award (and her sixth nomination); she won a total of five with a sixth for Lifetime Achievement.

== Winners and nominees ==
Winners are in bold

Best Play	Best Musical
**That Championship Season – Jason Miller**; Butley – Simon Gray; The Changing Room – David Storey; The Sunshine Boys – Neil Simon	**A Little Night Music**; Don't Bother Me, I Can't Cope; Pippin; Sugar
Best Book of a Musical	Best Original Score (Music and/or Lyrics) Written for the Theatre
**Hugh Wheeler – A Little Night Music**; Micki Grant – Don't Bother Me, I Can't Cope; Melvin Van Peebles – Don't Play Us Cheap; Roger O. Hirson – Pippin	**A Little Night Music – Stephen Sondheim (music and lyrics)**; Don't Bother Me, I Can't Cope – Micki Grant (music and lyrics); Much Ado About Nothing – Peter Link (music); Pippin – Stephen Schwartz (music and lyrics)
Best Performance by a Leading Actor in a Play	Best Performance by a Leading Actress in a Play
**Alan Bates – Butley as Ben Butley**; Jack Albertson – The Sunshine Boys as Willie Clark; Wilfrid Hyde-White – The Jockey Club Stakes as Marquis of Candover; Paul Sorvino – That Championship Season as Phil Romano	**Julie Harris – The Last of Mrs. Lincoln as Mary Todd Lincoln**; Jane Alexander – 6 Rms Riv Vu as Annie Miller; Colleen Dewhurst – Mourning Becomes Electra as Christine Mannon; Kathleen Widdoes – Much Ado About Nothing as Beatrice
Best Performance by a Leading Actor in a Musical	Best Performance by a Leading Actress in a Musical
**Ben Vereen – Pippin as The Leading Player**; Len Cariou – A Little Night Music as Frederick Egerman; Robert Morse – Sugar as Jerry; Brock Peters – Lost in the Stars as Stephen Kumalo	**Glynis Johns – A Little Night Music as Desiree Armfeldt**; Leland Palmer – Pippin as Fastrada; Debbie Reynolds – Irene as Irene O'Dare; Marcia Rodd – Shelter as Maud
Best Performance by a Supporting or Featured Actor in a Play	Best Performance by a Supporting or Featured Actress in a Play
**John Lithgow – The Changing Room as Kenny Kendal**; Barnard Hughes – Much Ado About Nothing as Dogberry; John McMartin – Don Juan as Sganarelle; Hayward Morse – Butley as Joseph Keyston	**Leora Dana – The Last of Mrs. Lincoln as Elizabeth Edwards**; Maya Angelou – Look Away as Elizabeth Keckley; Katherine Helmond – The Great God Brown as Margaret; Penelope Windust – Elizabeth I as Elizabeth the Player Queen
Best Performance by a Supporting or Featured Actor in a Musical	Best Performance by a Supporting or Featured Actress in a Musical
**George S. Irving – Irene as Madame Lucy**; Laurence Guittard – A Little Night Music as Count Carl-Magnus Malcolm; Avon Long – Don't Play Us Cheap as David; Gilbert Price – Lost in the Stars as Absalom Kumalo	**Patricia Elliott – A Little Night Music as Charlotte Malcolm**; Hermione Gingold – A Little Night Music as Madame Armfeldt; Patsy Kelly – Irene as Mrs. O'Dare; Irene Ryan – Pippin as Berthe
Best Direction of a Play	Best Direction of a Musical
**A.J. Antoon – That Championship Season**; A.J. Antoon – Much Ado About Nothing; Alan Arkin – The Sunshine Boys; Michael Rudman – The Changing Room	**Bob Fosse – Pippin**; Vinnette Carroll – Don't Bother Me, I Can't Cope; Gower Champion – Sugar; Harold Prince – A Little Night Music
Best Choreography	Best Scenic Design
**Bob Fosse – Pippin**; Gower Champion – Sugar; Peter Gennaro – Irene; Donald Saddler – Much Ado About Nothing	**Tony Walton – Pippin**; Boris Aronson – A Little Night Music; David Jenkins – The Changing Room; Santo Loquasto – That Championship Season
Best Costume Design	Best Lighting Design
**Florence Klotz – A Little Night Music**; Theoni V. Aldredge – Much Ado About Nothing; Miles White – Tricks; Patricia Zipprodt – Pippin	**Jules Fisher – Pippin**; Martin Aronstein – Much Ado About Nothing; Ian Calderon – That Championship Season; Tharon Musser – A Little Night Music

== Special awards ==
These awards were given under the new title of "Theater Awards '73".

- John Lindsay, Mayor of New York City (construction of legitimate theaters)
- Actors' Fund of America (honored for 90 years of assistance to needy and elderly theater people)
- Shubert Organization (for nearly 75 years of activity as well as for the Shubert Foundation)

=== Multiple nominations and awards ===
These productions had multiple nominations:

- 12 nominations: A Little Night Music
- 11 nominations: Pippin
- 7 nominations: Much Ado About Nothing
- 5 nominations: That Championship Season
- 4 nominations: The Changing Room, Don't Bother Me, I Can't Cope, Irene and Sugar
- 3 nominations: Butley and The Sunshine Boys
- 2 nominations: Don't Play Us Cheap, The Last of Mrs. Lincoln and Lost in the Stars

The following productions received multiple awards.

- 6 wins: A Little Night Music
- 5 wins: Pippin
- 2 wins: The Last of Mrs. Lincoln and That Championship Season

== See also ==
- 45th Academy Awards
