= Arnold Wilkerson =

American actor

Arnold Wilkerson (born April 6, 1943) is an American actor and the creator and owner of the Little Pie Company in Manhattan, New York City. As an actor, he is particularly known for portraying roles in the original productions of the musicals Hair, Jimmy Shine, and Don't Bother Me, I Can't Cope.

== Biography ==
Wilkerson was born and raised in San Francisco, California. He attended the Royal Academy of Dramatic Art in London where he graduated with a diploma in acting. He moved to New York City, making his Off-Broadway debut as Hud in the original production of James Rado and Gerome Ragni's Hair at Joseph Papp's Public Theater in October 1967. He made his Broadway debut in 1968 as Arnold in the original production of John Sebastian's Jimmy Shine, sharing the stage with Dustin Hoffman and Rue McClanahan. In 1969 he acted in Jon Swan's Fireworks at the Village South Theatre. That same year he appeared in the original production of Ronald Ribman's The Most Beautiful Fish with Eileen Dietz which was commissioned by New York Television Theatre for broadcast on PBS.

In 1971, Wilkerson appeared in the world premiere of Micki Grant's Don't Bother Me, I Can't Cope at the Ford's Theatre in Washington, D.C. He continued with the production when it moved to Broadway the following year. The show was nominated for a Tony Award for Best Musical.

In 1974, he played the role of Jimmy in The Autobiography of Miss Jane Pittman.

After Don't Bother Me, I Can't Cope, Wilkerson's acting career went through a slump and he worked largely as a waiter. In 1983 he, along with business partner Michael Deraney, founded the Little Pie Company, a popular Manhattan bakery that specializes in pies. The bakery has since expanded to two locations and has been featured on a number of occasions in The New York Times. In addition, some of Wilkerson's pie recipes have been published in the newspaper.
