= Richard Becker =

Richard Becker may refer to:

== Politics ==
- Richard M. Becker (1931–2007), Kansas state legislator
- Richard L. Becker (1905–2004), Kansas state legislator
- Rick Becker, former member of the North Dakota House of Representatives

== Sports ==
- Richard Becker (tennis) (born 1991), German tennis player
- Rich Becker (born 1972), American baseball outfielder

== Other ==
- Richard Becker (physicist) (1887–1955), German theoretical physicist
- Richard Becker (music publisher), American music publisher
- Richard S. Becker (1926–2015), United States Air Force flying ace
