= Don't Bother Me, I Can't Cope (original Broadway cast recording) =

Don't Bother Me, I Can't Cope – Original Broadway Cast

Cast recording by the original Broadway cast
- Released: 1972
- Label: Polydor

Don't Bother Me, I Can't Cope, subtitled Original Broadway Cast, is an album containing a recording of the musical review Don't Bother Me, I Can't Cope made by its 1972 Broadway cast. The album was released in the same year by Polydor.

== Background ==
The album was produced by Jerry Ragavoy.

== Critical reception ==
Professional ratings
Review scores
Source	Rating
Billboard	4/4 stars
Stereo Review	Performance: Energetic; Recording: Good

Stereo Review reviewed the album, noting: "A new phenomenon on the current Broadway stage is the sudden rash of virtually plotless musical entertainments that portray the emotions, frustrations, and general block-party atmosphere of the black experience. This particular addition to the genre is more original and tuneful than most, and though it doesn't add up to much as a theatrical experience, it does provide some isolated moments of joy on record. Most of those moments occur when a dynamo named Micki Grant steps to the microphone and sings about her soul [...]."

== Track listing ==
LP – Polydor PD 6013

All lyrics are written by Micki Grant; all music is composed by Micki Grant.

Side 1
No.	Title	Artist(s)	Length
1.	"I Gotta Keep Movin'"	Alex Bradford and Company	2:50
2.	"Harlem Streets / Lookin' Over from Your Side"	Bobby Hill and Company	3:36
3.	"Don't Bother Me, I Can't Cope"	Entire Company	2:15
4.	"Fighting for Pharoah"	Alex Bradford, Bobby Hill, Alberta Bradford, Charles Campbell	6:03
5.	"Good Vibrations"	Alex Bradford and Company	2:55
6.	"You Think I Got Rhythm / They Keep Coming / My Name Is Man" "You Think I Got Rhythm" "They Keep Coming" "My Name Is Man"	Entire Company; Entire Company; Arnold Wilkerson and Company	6:25

Side 2
No.	Title	Artist(s)	Length
1.	"Love Power"	Bobby Hill, Hope Clarke and Company	2:20
2.	"Questions"	Micki Grant	3:55
3.	"It Takes a Whole Lot of Human Feeling"	Micki Grant	3:21
4.	"You Think I Got Rhythm? / Time Brings About Change"	Arnold Wilkerson, Micki Grant and Company	2:34
5.	"So Little Time"	Micki Grant	4:06
6.	"Thank Heaven for You"	Bobby Hill, Micki Grant	3:37
7.	"All I Need / I Gotta Keep Movin'" (Reprise) "All I Need" "I Gotta Keep Movin'" (Reprise)	Alberta Bradford and Company; Micki Grant, Alex Bradford and Company	4:36

== Awards ==
Year	Award type	Categories	Results	Ref.
1973	Grammy Awards	Best Score from an Original Cast Show Album	Won	
