= Deferment rate =

In property valuation, a deferment rate is a discount rate applied to the current price of a property in order to assess the present value of the right to vacant possession of a residential property at the end of a leasehold to which the freehold is subject.

The rate is a key component of the calculation used to determine the cost of leasehold enfranchisement.

== Background ==
The landlord owns a 'reversion', i.e. at the end of the lease, they will have exclusive possession of the property which they can then sell or rent. If the lessee is enfranchised, that is, gets absolute and perpetual possession of the property, the landlord will lose the reversion value. The Leasehold Reform Act 1967 (houses) and the Leasehold Reform, Housing and Urban Development Act 1993 (for flats) aim to ensure that the landlord has fair compensation for this loss of value.

Computing the amount of compensation requires estimating the value of deferred possession of the property – the value of the property now minus the lost income or use for the period of the lease ('jam today is worth more than jam tomorrow'). The value of deferred possession is given by the deferment rate, or the rate of return that the lessor would have received, net of management, void and maintenance costs, over the period of the lease. Lessees will typically want a high deferment rate, lessors will typically want a low deferment rate.

== Sportelli method ==
Following the Sportelli case the Lands Tribunal adopted the so-called Sportelli formula to determine the rate, as follows.

q = r* + P – g*

Where q is the deferment rate, r* the real risk free rate, P the risk premium for the residential property market, and g* the real long-term growth in house prices.

== Hedonic regression method ==
An alternative to the Sportelli method was proposed by Bracke et al in October 2016. The authors collected market data for leases in the period 1987 to 1991, aiming to isolate the effect on value of the unexpired length of the lease in each such case by the statistical method known as hedonic regression. However this method was rejected by the Upper Tribunal in January 2018.
