= But Never Jam Today =

- Music: Bert Keyes and Bob Larimer
- Lyrics: Bob Larimer
- Book: Vinnette Carroll & Bob Larimer
- Basis: Works of Lewis Carroll
- Productions: 1979 Broadway

But Never Jam Today is a 1979 musical with music by Bert Keyes and Bob Larimer, lyrics by Larimer, and a book by both Larimer and Vinnette Carroll. The musical is based on the works of Lewis Carroll, and takes its title from the "jam tomorrow" discussion in Carroll's 1871 novel Through the Looking-Glass.

== Background ==
The musical Alice by Micki Grant previously adapted Alice's adventures to the stage, opening May 31, 1978 in Philadelphia in a pre-Broadway tryout.

== Production ==
Produced by Arch Nadler, Anita MacShane, and The Urban Arts Theatre at the Longacre Theatre, the show opened at the Longacre Theatre on July 31, 1979, and closed August 5 after only eight performances. The original theatrical poster was designed by David Edward Byrd, the last he created before leaving New York for Los Angeles.

The show was directed and devised by Vinnette Carroll, with choreography by Talley Beatty, musical direction and incidental music by Donald O. Johnston, set and costume design by William Schroder, lighting design by Ken Billington, choral arrangement and vocal preparation by Cleavant Derricks, sound design by T. Richard Fitzgerald, orchestrations by Bert Keyes, special orchestration by H. B. Barnum and Larry Black, dance music by Barnum, production manager Robert L. Borod, stage manager Robert Charles, and press by Alpert/Levine and Mark Goldstaub.

The show starred Marilynn Winbush (Alice), Cleavant Derricks, (Caterpillar, Cook, Tweedledee, Seven of Spades), Lynne Thigpen (Persona Non Grata), Lynne Clifton-Allen (Black Queen), Jeffrey Anderson-Gunter (White Rabbit, Cheshire Cat, Mock Turtle), Reginald VelJohnson (Duchess, Humpty-Dumpty, King of Hearts), Jai Oscar St. John (Mad Hatter, Tweedledum, Two of Spades), Sheila Ellis (March Hare, Five of Spades, Cook), Celestine DeSaussure (Dormouse, Cook), and Charlene Harris (White Queen, Queen of Hearts). The Mushrooms were Brenda Braxton, Clayton Strange, Sharon K. Brooks, Garry Q. Lewis, Celestine DeSaussure, and Jeffrey Anderson-Gunter. The Guards were Clayton Strange and Garry Q. Lewis.

== Scenes ==
Act I

- Scene 1 - Down the rabbit hole
- Scene 2 - Interview with a Caterpillar (square 1)
- Scene 3 - The Black Queen (Square 2)
- Scene 4 - The Kitchen of the Duchess (Square 3)
- Scene 5 - The Cheshire Cat
- Scene 6 - A Mad Party (Square 4)
- Scene 7 - The White Queen (Square 5)
- Scene 8 - Humpty Dumpty
- Scene 9 - Tweedledee and Tweedledum (Square 6)

Act II

- Scene 1 - The Queen of Hearts's croquet ground
- Scene 2 - The Queen's Dungeon
- Scene 3 - The Mock Turtle (Square 7)
- Scene 4 - The Queen's dungeon
- Scene 5 - An examination (Square 8)
- Scene 6 - Alice's reward
- Scene 7 - The daydream ends

== Musical numbers ==
Act 1

- Curiouser and Curiouser - Alice
- Twinkle, Twinkle Little Star - Caterpillar, Persona Non Grata, Company
- Long Live The Queen - Black Queen, Alice
- A Real Life Lullabye - Duchess, Cooks
- The More I See People - Cheshire Cat
- My Little Room - Alice
- But Never Jam Today - White Queen, Alice
- Riding For A Fall - Persona Non Grata, Humpty Dumpty, Alice
- All The Same To Me- Tweedledee, Tweedledum
- I've Got My Orders - Alice

Act 2

- God Could Give Me Anything - Two, Five, Seven of Spades
- But Never Jam Today (Reprise) - Company, Persona Non Grata
- I Like To Win - Alice
- And They All Call The Hatter Mad - Persona Non Grata
- Jumping From Rock To Rock - Mock Turtle, Alice, Company
- They - Two, Five, Seven of Spades
- Long Live The Company (Reprise) - Company
- I've Got My Orders (Reprise) - Alice, Company

Bibliography

- "The Best Plays of 1979-1980". Dodd, Mead & Company, 1980, pp. 357–359. ISBN 0-396-07907-5.
