= Bert Keyes =

- Birth name: Ebert Adolphus Mahon
- Also known as: Burt Keyes
- Born: September 11, 1930; Brooklyn, New York, U.S.
- Died: July 21, 1987 (aged 56); Central Islip, New York, U.S.
- Genres: R&B, pop
- Occupation(s): Pianist, songwriter, arranger
- Years active: c.1948–1980s

Ebert Adolphus Mahon (September 11, 1930 – July 21, 1987), known professionally as Bert Keyes, was an American pianist, songwriter, singer, and arranger.

== Biography ==
Born in Brooklyn, New York, Keyes first came to prominence as accompanist to singer Ruth Brown in the late 1940s, before working with trumpeter Taft Jordan. In 1953, George Goldner appointed him as A&R director, musical director and arranger at his new Rama label, where for the next four years he worked with such groups as the Crows, the Five Budds and the Blue Notes, as well as recording several songs as a solo performer including "Write Me Baby" (1954).

He then became Lavern Baker's pianist and arranger on Atlantic Records. He also worked for several other labels as a songwriter and arranger with musicians including Willie Bobo, Albert King, Eydie Gormé, Timi Yuro, and Billy Bland, often working with record producer Clyde Otis. He co-wrote Nat King Cole's 1958 hit "Angel Smile", and arranged Inez and Charlie Foxx's 1963 hit "Mockingbird".

As a songwriter, Keyes is credited with over 120 compositions. With Sylvia Robinson, he co-wrote "Love on a Two-Way Street", first recorded by Lezli Valentine on Robinson's All Platinum label in 1968, and later a chart hit for The Moments. The Moments' recording was sampled on Jay-Z and Alicia Keys' number one single "Empire State of Mind" in 2009. Keyes also moved into composing and arranging music for movies and television, including the 1975 animated movie Hugo the Hippo. In 1979, Keyes co-wrote a musical, But Never Jam Today, based on the works of Lewis Carroll.

He died in Central Islip, New York, in 1987, aged 56.
