= Tomorrow, the World! =

1944 film by Leslie Fenton

- Theatrical release poster
- Directed by: Leslie Fenton
- Screenplay by: Ring Lardner, Jr. Leopold Atlas
- Based on: Tomorrow, the World! (play) by James Gow and Arnaud d'Usseau
- Produced by: Lester Cowan; David Hall (associate producer)
- Starring: Fredric March; Betty Field; Agnes Moorehead; Skip Homeier
- Cinematography: Henry Sharp
- Edited by: Anne Bauchens
- Music by: Louis Applebaum
- Distributed by: United Artists
- Release date: December 29, 1944
- Running time: 86 min (82 min in the Video-Cinema Films Inc. print)
- Country: United States
- Languages: English and German
- Budget: over $800,000

Tomorrow, the World! is a 1944 American black-and-white film directed by Leslie Fenton and starring Fredric March, Betty Field, and Agnes Moorehead, about a young German boy (Skip Homeier) who had been active in the Hitler Youth who comes to live with his uncle in the United States, who tries to teach him to reject Nazism. It was based on the successful 1943 Broadway play.

The title comes from Hitler's threat: "Today Germany; tomorrow the world."

== Plot ==
Emil Bruckner (Skip Homeier), a young German orphan, comes to live in the United States with his American uncle (Fredric March). Although the American family reaches out to the boy, trying to make him part of their lives, he has been heavily indoctrinated in Nazi propaganda from his years in the Hitler Youth.

His uncle is a "gently liberal university professor," while the young boy—even though he is an orphan with a father who was anti-Nazi—has become a parrot for the Third Reich, denouncing his late father as a traitor and being as nasty as possible to the professor's Jewish fiancée (Field).

Emil's father, Karl Bruckner, had died after being sent to a concentration camp for opposing the Nazi regime. His uncle, Mike Frame, holds Karl in the highest regard for his ideas, commitment to the ideas of universal peace, and his courage. The Nazis, however, have taught Emil that his father was a coward, a traitor to the state, and committed suicide. Emil believes the lies and mutilates a highly prized painting of his father.

All the characters have their unique perspectives and reactions in response to Emil's display of Third Reich sensibilities and most want to find the good in the boy—especially his cousin Pat (Joan Carroll). Emil, however, has other ideas, donning a Nazi armband soon after his arrival.

Emil refuses to make friends, spouts propaganda he learned in the Hitler Youth, and seeks to act as a Nazi agent on enemy soil, even attempting to recruit the Frames' German maid to his cause. He's horrified to find out that he's going to be mixing with kids of all backgrounds that he's been taught are inferior and that his teacher, Leona Richards—soon to be his aunt—is a Jew. He goes out of his way to mock a Polish boy and later ridicules the boy when he finds him hanging laundry. After first avoiding a fight, he pushes the boy into the mud from behind, and then slices the laundry line so that the clean linen will fall into the mud as well. When a shy girl sees what he has done he terrifies her into silence with the knowledge that her father is a prisoner of war in Germany, and threatens to have her father hurt. In an ironic moment, Emil is the one who exposes the incident to his teacher: unaware of the American custom of not squealing, he seeks to get his version on the record first and accuse others of lying. The resulting confrontation ends with Emil fleeing the school and scrawling antisemitic graffiti against his teacher, Miss Richards, on the sidewalk.

Seeking to break the engagement between his teacher and his Uncle Mike, Emil finally provokes her into slapping him (by calling her a "Jewish tramp") and then attempts to manipulate his Aunt Jessie, whose jealousy of the relationship he had perceived, into an alliance to this purpose, but only forces her to confront her own guilt.

Just before his birthday party is due to begin, Emil's cousin—Mike's daughter, Pat—catches him trying to break into a desk where he hopes to find classified documents. Following her to the basement, he attacks her with a fire iron and leaves her badly injured before fleeing the house. His schoolmates eventually apprehend him and bring him home to face the police. Before their arrival, he provokes his Uncle Mike with another threat against Pat, and Leona Richards intervenes to keep Mike from killing him.

Alone with Emil, Leona forces him to open one of his birthday presents. Seeing his cousin Pat's gift for him triggers Emil's first experience of remorse and guilt. Leona urges Mike to offer compassion and understanding rather than send Emil away. As Emil confronts his feelings about his father's death and his treatment at the hands of the Nazis, he begins to show remorse and remains with his new family.

== Cast ==
- Fredric March as Mike Frame
- Betty Field as Leona Richards
- Agnes Moorehead as Aunt Jessie Frame
- Joan Carroll as Pat Frame
- Edit Angold as Frieda, the Frames' maid
- Skip Homeier as Emil Bruckner (as Skippy Homeier)

== Background ==
The play Tomorrow, the World! opened on Broadway in New York City on 14 April 1943 and closed 17 June 1944 after 500 performances. The opening-night cast included Skip Homeier as Emil and Edit Angold as Frieda, both of whom originated their movie roles in the play, and Ralph Bellamy as Mike Frame, Shirley Booth as Leona Richards and Kathryn Givney as Jessie Frame. It marked the debut of actress Joyce Van Patten.

Producer Lester Cowan bought the rights to the play for $75,000 plus 25% of the gross, not to exceed $350,000. He wanted to change the title of the film to "The Intruder," but a poll of exhibitors voted him down.

== Reception ==
Rotten Tomatoes refers to the film as a "critically acclaimed World War II classic."

This movie was the debut film for Skip Homeier. He had played the role on Broadway for 500 performances before making this movie. Homeier was praised for his performance and received good reviews playing opposite Fredric March and Betty Field as his American uncle and aunt. When he died at the age of 86, The Guardian wrote, "In 1943, a 12-year-old boy actor stunned Broadway audiences with his portrayal of a German youth indoctrinated into Nazism. Brought to the US by an unsuspecting uncle, he soon threatens the family, then the whole community."

Billed in the film as Skippy Homeier, he is central to the movie and endows Emil with the fanaticism and hatred associated with boys brought up in the Nazi ideology and with a devotion to the party.

Tomorrow, the World! is one of the films highlighted in the 2004 television documentary, Imaginary Witness: Hollywood and the Holocaust, examining the way Hollywood films dealt with the sensitive topics of the Holocaust and antisemitism.

According to the website for Turner Classic Movies, the film "was one of a small handful of films of the period, among them The Seventh Cross (1944), that sought to depict the everyday German. Instead of focusing on cruel Nazi stereotypes, the film concerned itself with those who were misguided or victimized by Hitler's brutal regime."
