= Moon on a Rainbow Shawl =

1958 play written by Errol John

- Poster of original production
- Original language: English
- Written by: Errol John
- Characters: Ephraim; Rosa; Sophia Adams; Esther Adams; Charlie Adams; Mavis; Prince; Old Mack; Janette; Young Murray; Policeman; Sailor; Soldier; Ketch; (Ice Man); (Fish Woman)
- Genre: Tragedy
- Setting: Port of Spain, Trinidad

Premiere
- Date: December 4, 1958
- Place: Royal Court Theatre London

Moon on a Rainbow Shawl is a 1957 play written by Trinidadian actor-playwright Errol John. Described as "ground-breaking" and "a breakthrough in Britain for black writing," the play has been produced and revived worldwide since its premiere at London's Royal Court Theatre. It won the 1957 London Observer playwriting competition.

== Plot summary ==
Set in Port of Spain, Trinidad, the play opens on a hot, late evening in the yard of two dilapidated buildings. Ephraim is just returning from his work as a trolleybus conductor, and converses with Esther Adams, left home alone with her newborn brother. Esther, a very intelligent and studious girl, discusses how her family cannot afford for her to go to high school. Ephraim, secretly envious of her youth and opportunity to make a better life for herself than he has, encourages her. Esther's mother, Sophia comes home. Later, while Ephraim is sleeping, Rosa, Ephraim's lover, returns to the yard with their landowner and her employer, Old Mack. She is wearing solid gold earrings and other things that Old Mack has given her. Old Mack forces himself on Rosa despite her protests and struggles. Sophia, overhearing all this, interrupts him, and he leaves. Sophia tells Rosa that because she is proudly wearing his gifts "he is right to seek his rights". She then asks Rosa if she has "told" Ephraim yet, to which she responds that she has not. Rosa goes and wakes Ephraim. After kissing and her asking him if he would like to sleep with her, Ephraim rolls over and tells her to leave. When she does, however, he doesn't go to sleep again.

The next morning, policemen are investigating the café at which Rosa works. While Ephraim secretly listens, Rosa tells Sophia that it was robbed and that she also intends to "tell" Ephraim later that night. Rosa leaves with a policeman who makes her return to the café. Ephraim goes into the yard, and Sophia suspects that Ephraim is "up to something". Charlie, Sophia's husband, comes home drunk. When Rosa returns and sees Charlie, she immediately goes to her room.

That evening, Rosa tries to seduce Ephraim, but he will not sleep with her. Rosa discloses that she found Charlie's hat at the café, so she knows that he robbed the café. Due to this and the police's questioning, she fears that they will arrest Charlie. Ephraim yells at her endangering the Adams family when the wealthy, stingy Old Mack "could well afford to lose" the money stolen, and for accepting and wearing his expensive gifts. Ephraim tells her he is leaving for Liverpool the following night, but he does not want to bring Rosa with him anymore because she accepted the gifts from Old Mack. Rosa then tells Ephraim that she is pregnant for him to try and convince him to stay, but this only makes him more agitated. He thinks Rosa is trying to "trap" him there, and tells her to shed "no tears" for him. He tells her about how he was abandoned as a child, and got taken care of by his grandmother, who he in turn, abandoned in a poor-house to die. Rosa briefly tries to console Ephraim, but he rejects her and then "throws [her] out of his room."

The next day, Sophia gets Charlie to work on repairing cricket bats to earn themselves some money. Ephraim, who had gone to get something for his travels appears, and Charlie shows him one of the bats he is mending for a boy called Young Murray. The bad has "hardly an edge" even though the boy has been using it a lot, indicating incredible skill. Charlie tells Ephraim about his previous career as a cricketer, and how he was always treated worse than other members of the cricket team. He had caused a "stink" about it which had led to his superiors ending his career. Ephraim sympathises with him, then leaves. Old Mack, come to see Rosa appears, but Sophia does not let him in. Instead he starts up a conversation with Charlie about the event in his cafe. He tells Charlie that he suspects his employee, Stephen, of the crime. Later, Charlie, fearful that Stephen, is going to be arrested for his crime, confides to Sophia that he robbed the café. As Sophia suggests that they have Rosa speak to Old Mack and return the remaining money, Ephraim, overhearing the conversation, and demands that Sophia give him the money, so that Old Mack won't take it back. At this moment, the young policeman shows up, and, seeing this exchange, arrest Charlie.

Later that afternoon, Esther returns to an empty home. A brief exchange happens between her and Mavis, who asks her if she has eaten. The boy, Young Muray, comes to collect his bats from Charlie, and Sophia returns from the police station. She does not immediately tell Esther what happens, but asks Young Murray to send the money for the bats soon. Young Murray tells Sophia that the school he goes to is looking for a new cricket coach and says that the job would be open for Charlie. After he leaves, Sophia tells Esther about what happened, and she runs off, blaming her for what happened. Rosa informs Sophia that Old Mack said "the matter was out of his hands", and that she has given up on Ephraim—despite knowing that he is the father because she has slept with no one else.

In the evening, Ephraim is packing, and Sophia returns home after futilely searching for Esther. In spite of Sophia confronting him about abandoning a pregnant Rosa, Ephraim leaves the yard in a taxi. Sophia tries to comfort Rosa that she will be supported, but her words are interrupted by the sound of Old Mack calling from Rosa's room. The play ends with Esther's return, warmly calling for her mother.

== Characters ==
Ephraim: A young man who feels trapped in a Trinidadian society where opportunity and upward mobility is scarce and the rich abuse the poor. He wants more out of life, and sees Charlie's life as a future parallel to his own—barely scraping by, poor, and with dreams that can never be fulfilled.

Sophia Adams: A spirited although physically and emotionally exhausted woman, who is wife to Charlie and mother to Esther and her newborn boy. She cares fiercely for Esther's future, wants her to have a life outside of the yard and not end up like Mavis, and practices tough love on Esther and Charlie as a result. She also looks after Rosa as if she was family, and even offers to help her take care of her child when it is born.

Rosa: The lover of Ephraim, a young orphan who was raised by nuns, giving her a 'simple' outlook on life. She turns to Old Mack when Ephraim rejects her for accepting his gifts.

Old Mack: A 65-year-old, wealthy man. He owns the shacks that the Adams’, Ephraim, Rosa, and Mavis live in, as well as the café where Rosa works. Sophia notes that "he is a man [she's] never [known] to be generous", showing that his gifts to Rosa are obvious signs of his infatuation. His miserly nature propels the conflict that occurs in the play.

Esther Adams: Sophia and Charlie Adams' daughter. Young, bright and motivated, Esther represents a possibly positive future for Trinidad. The final stage directions note that Esther's call for her mother "should give the impression that the future could still be hers."

Charlie Adams: A former cricket player, who had dreams of playing professionally but was unable to achieve them because of the institutional racism he experienced. He is extremely supportive of his daughter and her efforts and, shown by his actions in the play, wants a bright and prosperous future for Esther.

Mavis: A prostitute who lives in the yard and whom Sophia detests. In the play, Mavis and her boyfriend (later fiancé) Prince serve primarily as comic relief.

Prince: Mavis's boyfriend and foil. He is not particularly fond of her profession, and proposes to her during the course of the play in an attempt to stop her from seeing Americans as clients and as an apology for striking her.

== Stage productions ==
=== Original 1958 cast and revised 1962 cast ===
The play in its first incarnation was staged at the Royal Court Theatre, London, on December 4, 1958. The cast was as follows:

- Earle Hyman as Ephraim
- Jacqueline Chan as Esther
- Barbara Assoon as Mavis
- Robert Jackson as American Soldier
- Vinnette Carroll as Sophia
- Lionel Ngakane as Old Mack
- Soraya Rafat as Rosa
- Johnny Sekka as Policeman
- Berril Briggs as Janette
- Leo Carera as Prince
- John Bouie as Charlie
- Leonard Davies as American Soldier
- Clifton Jones as Young Murray

The revised version of the play was first staged on January 15, 1962, at the East 11th Street Theatre, New York. The cast was as follows:

- James Earl Jones as Ephraim
- Robert Hill II as Ketch
- Kelly Marie Berry as Esther Adams
- Cicely Tyson as Mavis
- Michael Barton as Sailor
- Vinnette Carroll as Sophia Adams
- Melvin Stewart as Old Mack
- Ellen Holly as Rosa
- Ronald Mack as Policeman
- Bill Gunn as Prince
- Robert Earl Jones as Charlie Adams
- Peter Owens as Soldier
- Carolyn Strickland as Janette
- Wayne Grice as A Boy
- Warren Berry as Taxi Driver

=== Notable revivals ===
In 1988, the Almeida Theatre, London, revived the play, directed by Maya Angelou.

March 2012 saw a revival of the play at the National Theatre about which The Observer's Kate Kellaway wrote: "Michael Buffong's entertaining production is tender and true."

== Awards and nominations ==
Award	Recipient	Won/Nominated
1957: Observer Award for Best New Playwright	Errol John	WON
1962: Obie for Best Off-Broadway Actor	James Earl Jones (Clandestine on the Morning Line, The Apple and Moon on a Rainbow Shawl)	WON
1962: Obie for Distinguished Performance by an Actress	Vinnette Carroll (Sophia Adams)	WON
1988: Time Out Award for Best Performance by an Actress	Claire Benedict (Sophia Adams)	WON
2012: Whatsonstage.com Award for Best Supporting Actress in a Play	Jenny Jules (Mavis)	
