= Fireworks (play) =

Set of three one-act plays

Fireworks is a set of three one-act plays about American life by Jon Swan. The set includes the plays The Report, Football, and Fireworks For a Hot Fourth. The work premiered Off-Broadway at the Village South Theatre on June 11, 1969 where it ran for a total of seven performances.

== The Report ==
The Report is a commentary on the American Press. It follows two characters: Meg Lehmann, a journalist, and Ben Bran, a celebrated writer. Meg cons her way into an interview with Ben which develops into a game of cat and mouse with both trying to manipulate the other. The original production starred Monica Moran as Meg and Stephen Joyce as Ben.

== Football ==
Football is an allegorical play which uses an angry football coach at a Press Conference as a commentary on Lyndon B. Johnson and the Vietnam War. The original production starred Stephen Joyce as The Coach, Haig Chobanian as Claymore, Colgate Salsbury as Norden, John Wardwell as Geiger, Laurinda Barrett as Mrs. Ashland, and Arnold Wilkerson as Gore.

== Fireworks For a Hot Fourth ==
Fireworks For a Hot Fourth is a commentary on Suburban life in America. The play takes place at a cocktail party on the Fourth of July. The original cast included Arnold Wilkerson as the waiter, John Wardwell as Growth, Laurinda Barrett as Gloria, Kristina Callahan as Anna, Monica Moran as Belle, Stephen Joyce as Old Local, Colgate Salsbury as Sidney, and Haig Chobanian as Harold.
