= Repent at Leisure =

1941 film directed by Frank Woodruff

- Directed by: Frank Woodruff; James Andrews (assistant)
- Screenplay by: Jerry Cady
- Story by: James Gow; Arnaud D'Usseau
- Produced by: Cliff Reid
- Starring: Kent Taylor; Wendy Barrie; George Barbier.
- Cinematography: Nicholas Musuraca
- Edited by: Harry Marker
- Production company: RKO Radio Pictures
- Distributed by: RKO Radio Pictures
- Release date: April 4, 1941
- Running time: 67 minutes
- Country: United States
- Language: English

Repent at Leisure is a 1941 American domestic comedy film directed by Frank Woodruff from a screenplay by Jerry Cady based on a story by James Gow and Arnaud D'Usseau. Produced and distributed by RKO Radio Pictures, the film was released on April 4, 1941, and stars Kent Taylor, Wendy Barrie, and George Barbier. It is named after the aphorism "marry in haste, repent at leisure".

== Plot ==
Richard Hughes Emily Sanders daughter of Robert owner of Carlisle department store. Robert decides to fire only unmarried men to cut costs. Richard tells his department manager he's married to Emily. The department manager invites Richard and his 'wife' Emily to play bridge. Richard goes to Emily and together they decide to married. Emily tells her father she's married. They go to the Morgan's she during bridge Emily and Richard soundly defeat their hosts. Emily tells her hosts they have a baby. They leave their hosts' house and discuss where to find a baby. They adopt a baby with a year of probation.

== Cast ==
- Kent Taylor as Richard Hughes
- Wendy Barrie as Emily Baldwin
- George Barbier as Robert Cornelius 'R.C.' Baldwin
- Thurston Hall as Jay Buckingham
- Charles Lane as Clarence Morgan
- Nella Walker as Mrs. Sally Baldwin
- Rafael Storm as Prince Paul Stephanie
- Ruth Dietrich as Miss Flynn
- Cecil Cunningham as Mrs. Morgan
- George Chandler as Bus Conductor
