= Don't Bother Me, I Can't Cope =

1971 musical revue

- Original cast recording
- Music: Micki Grant
- Lyrics: Micki Grant
- Book: Revue
- Productions: 1971: Washington, D. C. 1972: Broadway; 1972: Mark Taper Forum, Los Angeles
- Awards: 1972: Outer Critics Circle Award

Don't Bother Me, I Can't Cope is a musical revue first staged in 1971 with music, lyrics and book by Micki Grant. It was originally produced by Edward Padula.

== Background and productions ==
The all-singing, all-dancing show focuses on the African-American experience with songs on such topics as tenements, slumlords, ghetto life, student protests, black power, and feminism. The music is a mixture of gospel, jazz, funk, soul, calypso, and soft rock.

The show had its first staging at Ford's Theatre in Washington, D.C. from September 15 to October 10, 1971, with subsequent stagings at the Locust and Walnut Street Theatres in Philadelphia.

The restaged Broadway production, directed by Vinnette Carroll, choreographed by George Faison, and lighting design by Ken Billington opened to acclaim on April 19, 1972, at the Playhouse Theatre, where it ran for two months before transferring to the Edison. It had a total run of 1065 performances. In his review of the opening night, Clive Barnes of The New York Times described it as "a mixture of a block party and a revival meeting" and wrote: "It is the unexpected that is the most delightful. Last night at the Playhouse Theater a new musical came clapping, stomping and stamping in. It is fresh, fun and black ...Black heroes such as Flip Wilson and Godfrey Cambridge, and even Bella Abzug and Ralph Nader are mentioned and the show makes wry mockery of the changing times and celebrates the rise of black aspiration and achievements ... the show is full of talent working together with a cohesion rarely encountered outside the dance world." Time magazine theater critic T.E. Kalem also praised the show, writing: "all heaven breaks loose on stage. This is the kind of show at which you want to blow kisses."

The cast included Micki Grant, Alex Bradford, Hope Clarke, and Arnold Wilkerson. With Vinnette Carroll as director, Don't Bother Me, I Can't Cope became the first Broadway play to be directed by an African-American woman, and Micki Grant was the first woman to write both the music and lyrics to a Broadway musical.

The 1972 Los Angeles production featured Paula Kelly, and that same year Loleatta Holloway led the cast at the Happy Medium Theatre in Chicago.

An original cast recording was released on the Polydor label in 1972, produced by Jerry Ragovoy.

In 2016 the York Theatre Company staged a limited engagement of Don't Bother Me, I Can't Cope with 10 performances between February 27 and March 6.

In July 2018, the show was revived in the Encores! Off-Center season at New York City Center, choreographed and directed by Savion Glover.

== Song list ==
- "I Gotta Keep Movin'" (reprised at play's end)
- "Harlem Streets"
- "Lookin' Over from Your Side"
- "Don't Bother Me, I Can't Cope"
- "Fighting for Pharaoh"
- "Good Vibrations"
- "You Think I Got Rhythm?"
- "They Keep Coming"
- "My Name Is Man"
- "Love Power"
- "Questions"
- "It Takes a Whole Lot of Human Feeling"
- "Time Brings About a Change"
- "So Little Time"
- "Thank Heaven for You"
- "All I Need"

== Recordings ==
- Don't Bother Me, I Can't Cope – Original Broadway Cast (1972)

== Awards and nominations ==
- Outer Critics Circle Award, best musical, 1972
- Drama Desk Award for Outstanding Performance (Grant)
- Drama Desk Award for Most Promising Lyricist
- Obie Award for Best Actor in a Musical (Bradford)
- Grammy Award for Best Score from an Original Cast Show Album (Grant & Ragavoy)
- Los Angeles Drama Critics Circle Award, Distinguished Direction, 1972 (Carroll)
- Los Angeles Drama Critics Circle Award, Distinguished Performance (Kelly)
- Los Angeles Drama Critics Circle Award, Distinguished Choreography (Claude Thompson)
- Los Angeles Drama Critics Circle Award, Distinguished Musical Direction and Arranging (H.B. Barnum)
- nominee, Tony Award for Best Musical, 1973
- nominee, Tony Award for Best Book of a Musical
- nominee, Tony Award for Best Original Score
- nominee, Tony Award for Best Direction of a Musical
