= Constantin Râuleț =

Romanian playwright, poet and prose writer

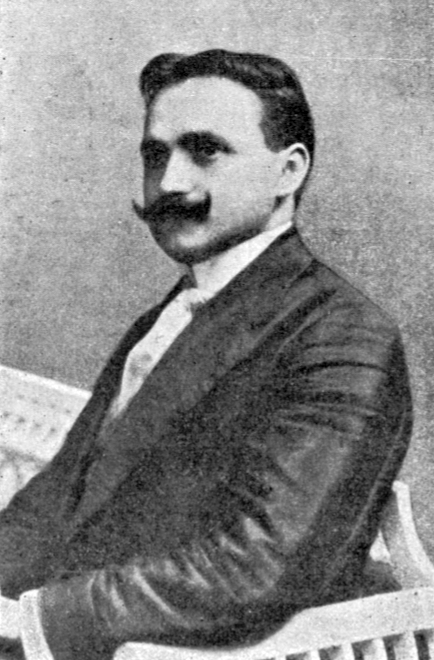
Constantin Râuleț

Constantin Râuleț (pen name of Constantin Rigopolu; August 22, 1882–1967) was a Romanian playwright, poet and prose writer.

== Life ==
Born in Bucharest, his parents were Sofocle Rigopolu, of Aromanian origin, and his wife Vasilichița (née Dodopol). A civil servant, he was director of the press section at the propaganda sub-secretariat, founder of the press directorate at the Interior Ministry and initiator of cinema censorship in Romania. He worked as an editor at Viitorul and Nașa reci. His first journalistic work appeared in Românul, while his first book was Epigrame (1908). His contributions appeared in Apărarea națională, Furnica and Belgia Orientului. His plays were Femei ciudate (1911), Cei mai de seamă (1912), Cu perdelele lăsate (1916), Baia domniței (1919), Pentru țară! (1922), Pălăria (1924), Urechea mahalalei (1926) and Papagalii (1929). His prose books were Piedica (1923), Ordaliile lui Mionel (1925), Noaptea măștilor sfâșiate (1930) and Mânia lui Hercule (1943). His poetry books were Poemele despărțirei (1921), Poezii (Romanian Writers' Society prize; 1925) and Sensibilitate (1938).
