= Jon Swan =

American dramatist (1929–2022)

- Born: Jon Christopher Swan; June 10, 1929; Sioux City, Iowa, U.S.
- Died: September 28, 2022 (aged 93); Yarmouth, Maine, U.S.
- Education: Oberlin College (B.A.); Boston University (M.A.)
- Occupations: Poet, playwright, journalist
- Spouse: Marianne Swan (m. 1962)
- Website: jonswanpoems.com

Jon Christopher Swan (June 10, 1929 – September 28, 2022) was an American poet, playwright, librettist, journalist, and editor. He studied at Oberlin College, from which he graduated with a degree in English in 1950. In the 1950s, he taught at the Ecole d'Humanite in Switzerland, worked for the American Friends Service Committee, and received a master's degree in English from Boston University. From 1956 to 1960, he was a fact checker and poetry reader at The New Yorker. In 1962, he and Marianne Hamaker were married in Haarlem, the Netherlands. During the 1970s, he worked as a translator, from Dutch and German, and was senior editor at Saturday Review and, later, senior editor of the Columbia Journalism Review. After retiring in 1994, he worked as an editor in Beijing and Kathmandu. As a free-lance journalist, he has written about environmental issues in the U.S. and Iceland. He was awarded a Rockefeller Grant for playwriting in 1968 and a Guggenheim Fellowship for filmwriting in 1981.

Swan published three collections of poems – Journeys and Return, A Door to the Forest, and Landscape & Language – and a collection of one-act plays. Among the plays produced are Three Cheers for What's-its-Name (1968), Fireworks (1969), Man In Space (1969), an adaptation of Aesop's Fables (1972), and Mostly Wolfgang (1991). In collaboration with Ulu Grosbard, Swan translated Peter Weiss's Die Ermittlung (The Investigation) into English for the work's premiere on Broadway in 1966 and translated Heinrich von Kleist's Der Zerbrochne Krug (The Broken Pitcher) for its New York premiere in 1981. He is also the author of the libretto of William Russo's chamber opera The Shepherds' Christmas (1988). In collaboration with Carl Weber, he completed a translation of Peter Weiss's play Hölderlin, published in 2010.

Swan died in Yarmouth, Maine on September 28, 2022, at the age of 93. He was survived by his wife, Marianne, three daughters, and two grandchildren.
