= Jam tomorrow =

Expression for a never-fulfilled promise

Jam tomorrow (but never today) is an absurd dictum which first appeared in Lewis Carroll's story Through the Looking-Glass and What Alice Found There. It is based on a rule of Latin grammar in which the word iam is used only in the future or past tense but never in the present tense. It is now commonly used to signify a promise which will never be satisfied.

== Origin ==
The expression originates from Lewis Carroll's 1871 book Through the Looking-Glass and What Alice Found There. In this children's story, the White Queen offers Alice "jam every other day" as an inducement to work for her:

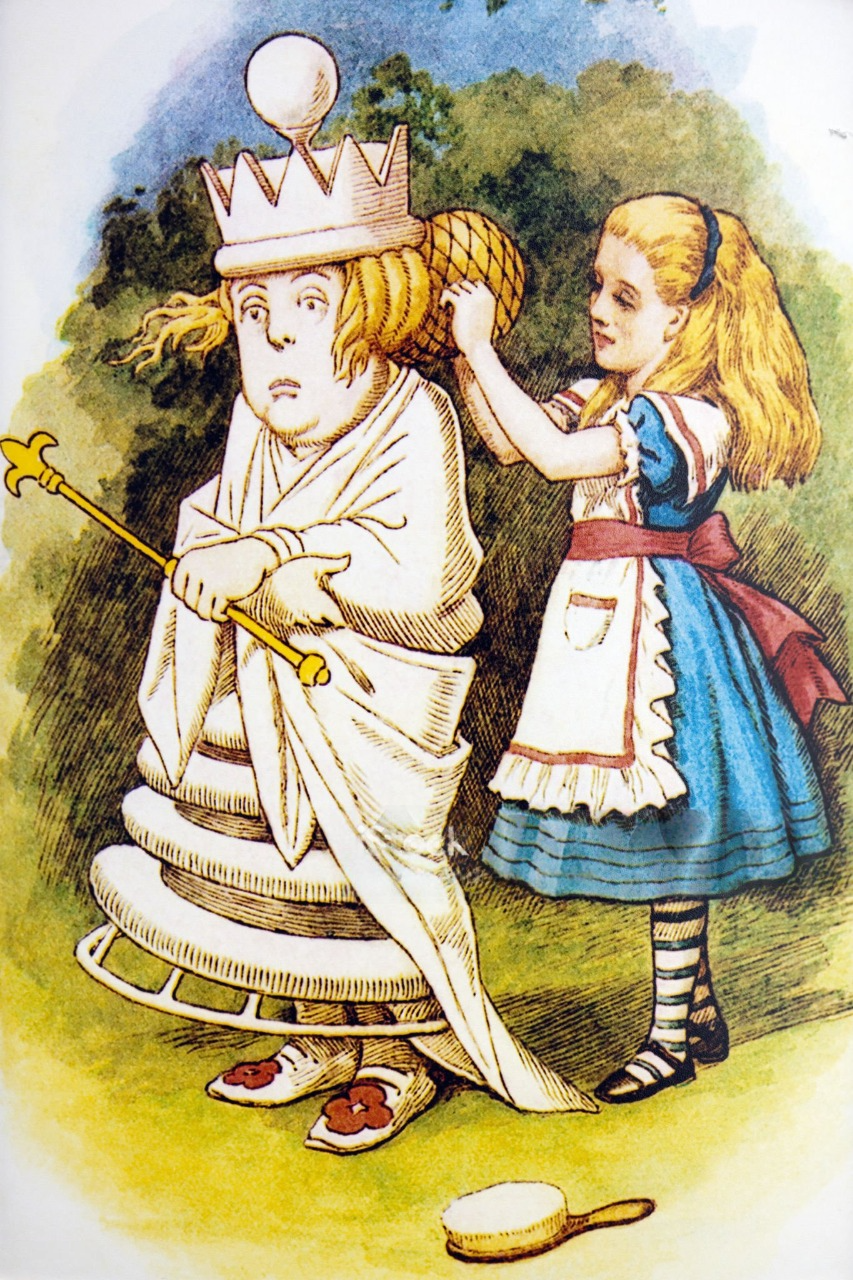

"I'm sure I'll take you with pleasure!" the Queen said. "Two pence a week, and jam every other day."
Alice couldn't help laughing, as she said, "I don't want you to hire me – and I don't care for jam."
"It's very good jam," said the Queen.
"Well, I don't want any to-day, at any rate."
"You couldn't have it if you did want it," the Queen said. "The rule is, jam to-morrow and jam yesterday – but never jam to-day."
"It must come sometimes to 'jam to-day'," Alice objected.
"No, it can't," said the Queen. "It's jam every other day: to-day isn't any other day, you know."
"I don't understand you," said Alice. "It's dreadfully confusing!"

This is a donnish joke based on the garbling of a grammatical rule for the Latin word iam (often written and pronounced jam). The Queen takes the rule to be that jam means "at this time", but only in the future or past tense; in the present tense the word nunc ("now") must be used instead. However iam can in fact be used with the present tense.

The passage inspired the title of the 1979 musical But Never Jam Today.

== Usage ==
In more recent times, the phrase has been used to describe a variety of unfulfilled political promises on issues such as tax, and was used by C. S. Lewis in satirizing the extrapolation of evolution from biological theory to philosophical guiding principle, in his 1957 poem "Evolutionary Hymn":

Lead us, Evolution, lead us
Up the future's endless stair:
Chop us, change us, prod us, weed us.
For stagnation is despair:
Groping, guessing, yet progressing,
Lead us nobody knows where.

Wrong or justice in the present,
Joy or sorrow, what are they
While there's always jam to-morrow,
While we tread the onward way?
Never knowing where we're going,
We can never go astray.

Lewis's poem is itself a parody-adaptation of the 19th-century hymn Lead us, Heavenly Father, Lead us by James Edmeston (1791–1867). The first verse is imitated by Lewis.

Lead us, heavenly Father, lead us
o'er the world's tempestuous sea;
guard us, guide us, keep us, feed us,
for we have no help but thee;
yet possessing every blessing,
if our God our Father be.

Monica Redlich's 1937 novel, for children and young adults, and older, uses the Carrollian phrase as its title, Jam Tomorrow. In the novel, it is the family motto of the children of an impoverished vicar. This is not their only quotation from Lewis Carroll, but it reflects their stoic acceptance of straitened means today, and an unquenched hope for better things in some unforeseen tomorrow.

John Maynard Keynes also makes use of the image of "never jam today" in order to portray the tendency to excessive saving which may lead to economic stagnation:

For purposiveness means that we are more concerned with the remote future results of our actions than with their own quality or their immediate effects on our own environment. The "purposive" man is always trying to secure a spurious and delusive immortality for his acts by pushing his interest in them forward into time. He does not love his cat, but his cat's kittens; nor, in truth, the kittens, but only the kittens' kittens, and so on forward forever to the end of cat-dom. For him jam is not jam unless it is a case of jam to-morrow and never jam to-day. Thus by pushing his jam always forward into the future, he strives to secure for his act of boiling it an immortality.

British folk musician Billy Bragg uses it in his 1986 song "The Home Front":

The constant promise of jam tomorrow,
Is the New Breed's litany and verse,
If it takes another war to fill the churches of England,
Then the world the meek inherit, what will it be worth?

The expression is similar to the idiom "pie in the sky" which was coined by Joe Hill in "The Preacher and the Slave".

== See also ==
- The cake is a lie
