= Maria Ventura =

Romanian-French actress and theatre director

Marie Ventura
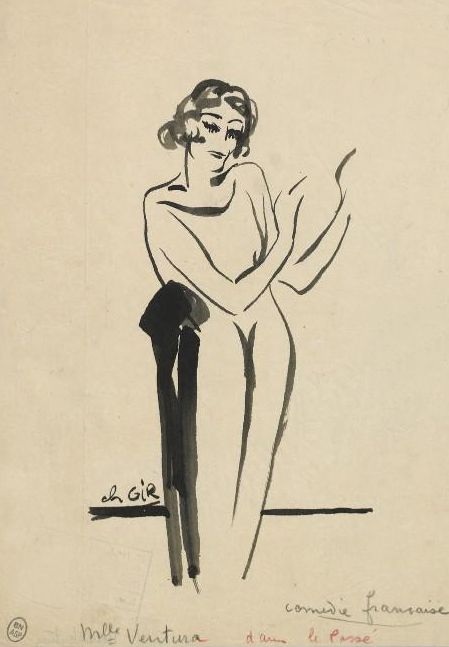
- Born: Aristida Maria Ventura; 14 July 1888; Bucharest, Romania
- Died: 3 December 1954 (aged 66); Paris, France
- Occupation: Actress

Marie Ventura (born Aristida Maria Ventura 14 July 1888 - 3 December 1954) was a Romanian-French actress and theatre director. From 1919 to 1941 she worked at the Comédie-Française. In 1938, she directed Iphigénie by Racine, becoming the first women to direct a play at the Comédie-Française.
