= Your Arms Too Short to Box with God =

- A Soaring Celebration in Song and Dance
- 1976 Broadway Playbill
- Music: Alex Bradford; Micki Grant
- Lyrics: Alex Bradford; Micki Grant
- Book: Vinnette Carroll
- Basis: The Book of Matthew
- Productions: 1976 Broadway; 1980 Broadway revival 1982 Broadway revival

Your Arms Too Short to Box with God: A Soaring Celebration in Song and Dance is a Broadway musical based on the Biblical Book of Matthew, with music and lyrics by Alex Bradford and a book by Vinnette Carroll, who also directed. Micki Grant was credited for "additional music and lyrics".

A 1980 revival was the Broadway debut of star Jennifer Holliday, then billed as Jennifer-Yvette Holliday.

== Original production ==
Produced by Frankie Hewitt and the Shubert Organization, it opened December 22, 1976, at Broadway's Lyceum Theatre in New York City. It moved to the Eugene O'Neill Theatre on November 16, 1977, and closed January 1, 1978, after 429 performances.

== Songs ==
Songs are listed with performers in the original Broadway version, as listed in Playbill Vault. There was no intermission.

- Beatitudes - Company
- We're Gonna Have a Good Time - Clinton Derricks-Carroll & Company
- There's a Stranger in Town - William Hardy, Jr. & Company
- Do You Know Jesus/He's a Wonder - Thomas Jefferson Fouse, Jr. & Company
- Just a Little Bit of Jesus Goes a Long Way - Sheila Ellis & Company
- We are the Priests and Elders - William Hardy, Jr., Clinton Derricks-Carroll, Bobby Hill, Michael Gray
- Something is Wrong in Jeruselem [sic] - Salome Bey, Mabel Robinson & Company
- I Was Alone - Derek Williams & Thomas Jefferson Fouse, Jr.
- I Know I Have to Leave Here - Derek Williams & Thomas Jeffersonn Fouse, Jr.
- Be Careful Whom You Kiss - Salome Bey & Company
- Trial - Company
- It's Too Late - Company
- Judas Dance - Hector Jaime Mercado
- Your Arms Too Short to Box with God - Delores Hall & Company (Cardell Hall, Lead Dancer)
- Give Us Barrabas - Company
- See How They Done My Lord - Salome Bey & Company
- Come On Down - Seila Ellis, Clinton Derricks-Carroll & Michael Gray
- Can't No Grave Hold My Body Down - Clinton Derricks-Carroll, Derek Williams & Company
- Beatitudes - Company
- Didn't I Tell You - William Hardy Jr & Company
- When The Power Comes - William Hardy Jr & Company
- Everybody Has His Own Way - Clinton Derricks-Carroll, Michael Gray, Thomas Jefferson Fouse, Jr.
- I Love You So Much Jesus - Delores Hall
- The Band - William Hardy, Jr., Delores Hall, Sheila Ellis & Company

== Revival ==
Your Arms Too Short to Box with God was revived twice on Broadway, first at the Ambassador Theatre and the Belasco Theatre (June 2 – October 12, 1980), then at the Alvin Theatre (September 9 – November 7, 1982). During the 1982 run, Al Green appeared with Patti LaBelle in the show.

== Legacy ==
The phrase first appeared in James Weldon Johnson's novel, The Autobiography of an Ex-Colored Man, in which he attributed it to a Black preacher named John Brown. Describing this powerful preacher, he wrote, "He struck the attitude of a pugilist and thundered out: 'Young man, your arm's too short to box with God!'"

Later James Weldon Johnson used it in his poem "The Prodigal Son", which was published in his 1927 book of poems God's Trombones: Seven Negro Sermons in Verse. The passage—which likewise refers to an arm (singular) rather than arms (plural)—reads:

Young man—
Young man—
Your arm's too short to box with God.

But Jesus spake in a parable, and he said:
A certain man had two sons.
Jesus didn't give this man a name,
But his name is God Almighty.
And Jesus didn't call these sons by name,
But ev'ry young man,
Ev'rywhere,

Is one of these two sons.

The title phrase has been used in other contexts. "Your lungs is too small to hotbox with God" is a line used by rapper Xzibit in Eminem's "Bitch Please 2". Xzibit later used a variation of the line ("Your little lungs is too weak to hotbox with God") on "Down for the Count" by Reflection Eternal. The phrase also appears in the Black Star song "Thieves in the Night", in the line "Your firearms are too short to box with God". GZA of the Wu-Tang Clan also used a variation ("Rhymes too short to box with God") on his track "Paper Plates" from Pro Tools. Killah Priest, an associate of Wu-Tang Clan, opened his debut album Heavy Mental with the phrase. It is in "It's All Real" by Pitch Black and "Mortal Combat" by Big Daddy Kane. Nas used the line in his song "You're Da Man" from his 2001 album Stillmatic, as well as Kid Rock's song "Trucker Anthem". The line also appears in "Drunk Daddy" by the Cherry Poppin' Daddies, and in "F.I.F.A." by Pusha T. This line is also used in Dumbfoundead's song, "Korean Jesus" with the lyrics "Buddha blessed, with Muhammad, trying to hotbox with Gods." Ralph Ellison uses the phrase in Invisible Man: "Your arms are too short to box with me, son." Professional wrestler CM Punk quoted the title word-for-word in a promotional clip on Monday Night Raw on January 7, 2013. He later referenced this segment again on Monday Night Raw on March 25, 2024. In the 1990 album "Let the Rhythm Hit ’Em" by Eric B and Rakim, the line "Your arms too short to box with God so quit it" appears in the song "Untouchable".

== Awards and nominations ==
Delores Hall won the 1977 Tony Award for Best Featured Actress in a Musical. Carroll earned Tony nominations for Best Book of a Musical and Best Direction of a Musical, with Talley Beatty nominated for Best Choreography.
