= Arnaud d'Usseau =

American dramatist

Arnaud d'Usseau (April 18, 1916 – January 29, 1990) was an American playwright and B-movie screenwriter known for his collaboration with Dorothy Parker on the play The Ladies of the Corridor.

== Career ==
D'Usseau was born in Los Angeles and was the son of Leon d'Usseau, also a screenwriter and director during the silent era. His mother, Ottola “Tola” Smith D’Usseau, was a character actress. He first came to notice as the co-writer (with James Gow) of Tomorrow, the World!, a 1943 drama about a German boy adopted by an American couple who then have to struggle with his Nazi upbringing. In 1945, another controversial play by D'Usseau and Gow followed, Deep Are the Roots, about a black army officer who falls in love with a former Senator's daughter. It ran for 477 performances over 14 months, directed by Elia Kazan and starring Barbara Bel Geddes and Gordon Heath. In 2012 the play was produced at the Metropolitan Playhouse.

In late 1950, his name appeared on the Hollywood blacklist as a Communist sympathizer. He was forced to appear before Senator Joseph McCarthy's anti-communist Tydings Committee in 1953, but declined to answer any questions, declaring that he would be glad to discuss Communism with the Senator in a forum where the cards were not stacked against him. Afterwards, he moved to Europe and continued to write screenplays under various pseudonyms. Upon returning to the United States, he taught screenwriting at New York University and the School of Visual Arts.

He died in 1990 at his home in New York, following surgery for stomach cancer.

== Selected filmography ==
- One Crowded Night (1940) dir. Irving Reis: Billie Seward, Gale Storm
- Lady Scarface (1941) dir. Frank Woodruff: Dennis O'Keefe, Frances Neal
- Repent at Leisure (1941) dir. Frank Woodruff: Kent Taylor, Wendy Barrie
- The Man Who Wouldn't Die (1942) dir. Herbert Leeds: Lloyd Nolan, Marjorie Weaver
- Who Is Hope Schuyler? (1942) dir. Thomas Loring: Joseph Allen Jr., Mary Howard
- Just Off Broadway (1942) dir. Herbert Leeds: Lloyd Nolan, Marjorie Weaver
- Horror Express (1972) dir. Eugenio Martin: Peter Cushing, Christopher Lee, Telly Savalas
- Psychomania (1973) dir. Don Sharp: Nicky Henson, George Sanders, Beryl Reid

== Sources ==
- Film Reference
