= Deep Are the Roots =

Deep Are the Roots is a 1945 play by Arnaud d'Usseau and James Gow about a decorated African-American soldier who has returned from World War II.

== Plot ==
Lieutenant Brett Charles returns to the Deep South, where he grew up as the son of the housekeeper in the mansion of a former senator. While serving in Europe, he was treated as a social equal by the English, French, and Italians, and he believes that through the education of the Black community, he can create progress and overcome segregation in the United States.

Senator Langdon becomes increasingly irate as he sees Brett shake hands with white people, enter the public library through the front door, and give a speech about equality at a church picnic. Langdon's older daughter Alice is a generous liberal, helping to secure educational opportunities and employment for Brett, but she turns against him when she learns of the budding romance between him and her younger sister, Genevra. With Alice's help, Langdon frames Brett for a theft he did not commit, and he is taken to jail.

Local outrage over seeing a war hero arrested on trumped up charges leads to his release. Although Brett loves Genevra, he rejects her offer of marriage, believing they could find no place in society. After expressing his anger and disappointment in Alice, they have a tentative rapprochement, and he vows to remain in the South and work for progress.

== Production history ==
The play was first staged on Broadway in September 1945, directed by Elia Kazan; starring Gordon Heath and Barbara Bel Geddes, it ran for 477 performances, closing in November 1946. The New York Times noted at the time that Deep Are the Roots did not "shy away from a problem" – racism in the Southern United States.

Writing for the Chicago Defender, Langston Hughes called Deep Are the Roots “the best play I have ever seen about the race problem,” and he praised the portrayal of the African-American war hero who “talks like a man, looks like a man, and expects to be treated as a man.”

The 1947 production in the West End of London starred Heath and Betsy Drake. Earl Cameron subsequently played the lead on tour and in various regional productions.

The play was revived at New York City's Metropolitan Playhouse in 2012.

== Adaptations ==
The play was adapted for Australian radio in 1947 with Grant Taylor.
