= James Gow (writer) =

American writer (1907–1952)

James Gow (August 23, 1907 – February 11, 1952) was an American writer, screenwriter, and playwright. He was the motion picture critic of the New York World. He wrote the film One Night of Love and co-wrote the film Repent at Leisure with Arnaud d'Usseau. Gow wrote the plays Tomorrow the World, Deep Are the Roots, and Legend of Sarah with d'Usseau.

== Life and career ==
Gow was born on August 23, 1907, in Creston, Iowa. He attended the University of Iowa and the University of Colorado, graduating from the latter.

From 1928 to 1931, he worked as a reporter for the New York World. He was a member of the film committee of the Fourth American Writers Congress in 1941.

Tomorrow the World opened on Broadway in April 1943. The play ran for 500 performances and was later adapted into a 1944 film directed by Leslie Fenton. The opening night cast included Ralph Bellamy, Shirley Booth, and Joyce Van Patten. The play was also produced in London and Moscow. The play was revived at the Hollywood Playhouse in 1993.

Deep Are the Roots opened on Broadway in September 1945. The play was the first independent production of Kermit Bloomgarden. Deep are the Roots ran for 477 performances. The Los Angeles Times described the play as having "raised the then-scandalous theme of miscegenation while pleading for racial tolerance." The play was revived at the Metropolitan Playhouse in 2012.

Legend of Sarah opened on Broadway in October 1950. The play is a comedy.

Gow died of a heart attack on February 11, 1952, in New York City, New York. He was married to Olga Alexander.

=== Communist ties ===
He was a member of the League of American Writers, an organization created by the Communist Party.

Gow was a sponsor of the Cultural and Scientific Conference for World Peace. According to the House Un-American Activities Committee, Gow was affiliated with the American Labor Party, Stage for Action, the Citizens Committee for Robert Thompson and Benjamin J. Davis, the Committee to Defend Don West, and was a supporter of Henry A. Wallace's presidential candidacy.

Arnaud d'Usseau was questioned about Gow's communist ties by Roy Cohn after being subpoenaed.

== Works ==
=== Films ===
- One Night of Love (1934)
- Thanks a Million (1935)
- All the King's Horses (1935)
- I Dream Too Much (1935)
- Murder on a Bridle Path (1936)
- Bunker Bean (1936)
- Shall We Dance (1937)
- Repent at Leisure (1941)
- Moonlight in Hawaii (1941)

=== Plays ===
- Tomorrow the World (1943)
- Deep are the Roots (1945)
- Legend of Sarah (1950)
