= Alex Bradford =

American gospel singer and choir director (1927–1978)

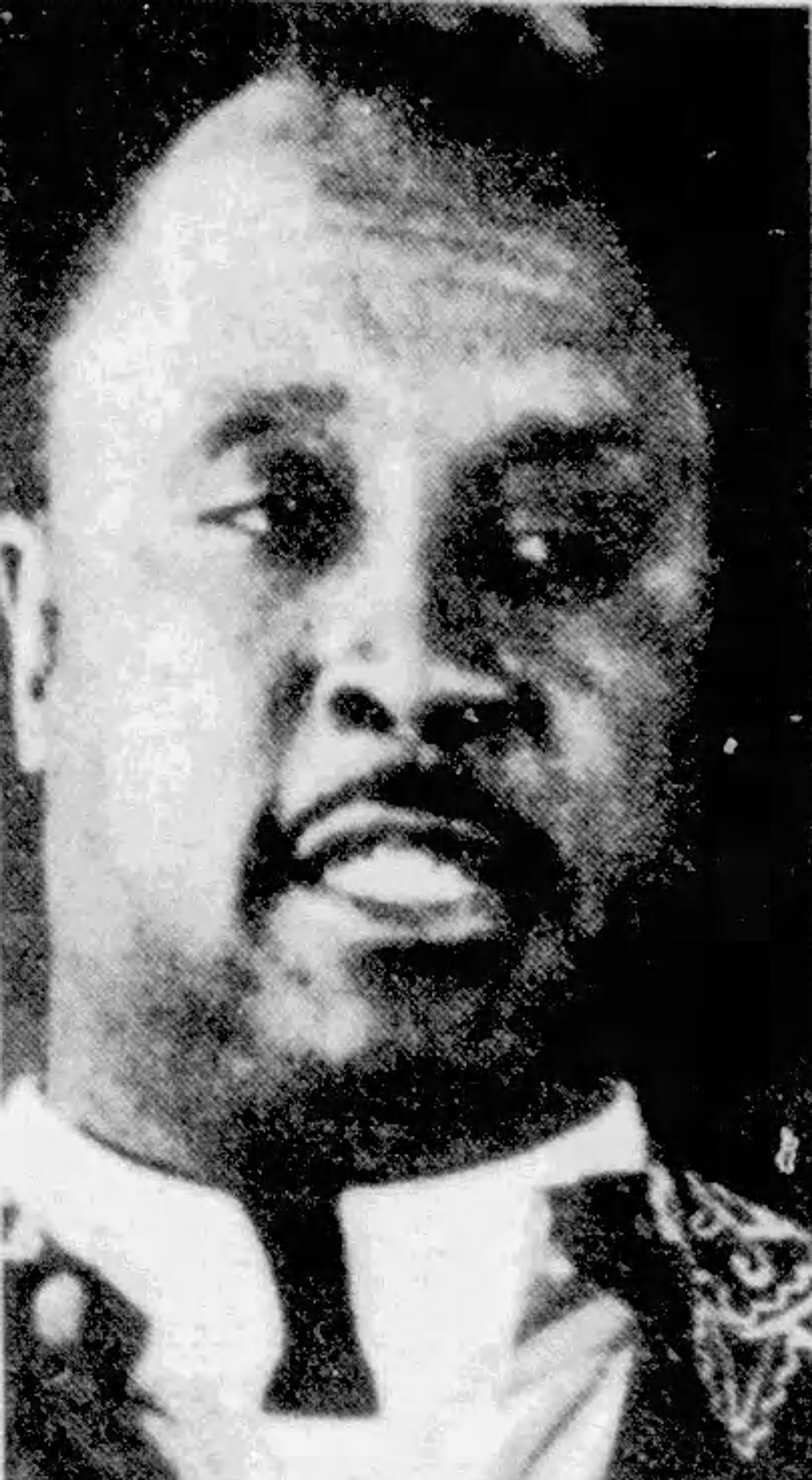
- Bradford c. 1977

Background information
- Born: January 23, 1927; Bessemer, Alabama, U.S.
- Origin: New York City, Chicago, Illinois
- Died: February 15, 1978 (aged 51) Newark, New Jersey, U.S.
- Genres: Gospel
- Occupations: Singer, musician, composer
- Years active: 1931–1978
- Labels: Apollo, Specialty, Savoy, Gospel, Vee-Jay, Checker, Nashboro, Columbia, Jubilee
- Formerly of: The Bradford Singers, The Bradford Specials

Alex Bradford (January 23, 1927 – February 15, 1978) was an American gospel composer, singer, arranger and choir director, who was an influence on artists such as Little Richard, Bob Marley and Ray Charles, and who helped bring about the modern mass choir movement in gospel.

== Biography ==
Born in Bessemer, Alabama, United States, he first appeared on stage at the age of four, then joined a children's gospel group at the age of 13, soon obtaining his own radio show.

He organized another group after his mother sent him to New York City following a racial incident; he continued singing after returning to attend the Snow Hill Institute in Snow Hill, Alabama, where he acquired the title "Professor" while teaching as a student.

He moved to Chicago in 1947, where he worked briefly with Roberta Martin and toured with Mahalia Jackson, then struck out on his own with his own group, the Bradford Singers, followed by another group, the Bradford Specials. He recorded his first hit record, "Too Close To Heaven" (1954), billed as Professor Alex Bradford and the Bradford Specials, sold over one million copies, and was awarded a gold disc, then followed it with a number of other successes in the rest of the decade.

Artists such as Little Richard imitated Bradford's energetic style, ranging from a gravelly bass to a whooping falsetto, and his flamboyant stage presence. Ray Charles, for his part, not only borrowed some of Bradford's vocal mannerisms but based his Raelets on the Bradford Specials. His 1962 gospel song composition "Let the Lord Be Seen in Me", recorded for his One Step & Angel on Vacation album, was also recorded in 1964 by an emerging force in Jamaican music, Bob Marley & the Spiritual Sisters. Marley later adopted the Rastafarian faith, but along with his mother, at first he sang gospel in the local Shilo Apostolic Church.

Bradford provided narration and singing for a 1967 animated short film by Richard Williams Productions, entitled Sailor and the Devil.

In 1961, when his recording career was in decline, Bradford joined the cast of the off-Broadway show Black Nativity, based on the writings of Langston Hughes, which toured Europe in 1962. A member of the Alex Bradford Singers at that time was Madeline Bell, who settled in England after the show ended. Bradford appeared in Don't Bother Me, I Can't Cope, for which he won the Obie award in 1972.

== Death ==
Alex Bradford died in Newark, New Jersey, at age 51 years old, in 1978 after a stroke. At the time of his death he was preparing the musical Your Arms Too Short to Box with God.
