= Micki Grant =

American actress (1929–2021)

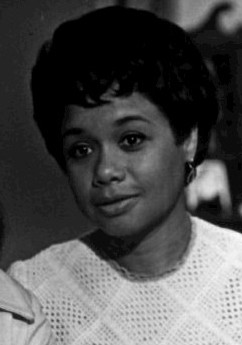
- Grant on Another World, 1968
- Born: Minnie Louise Perkins; June 30, 1929; Chicago, Illinois, U.S.
- Died: August 22, 2021 (aged 92); New York City, U.S.
- Education: Lehman College
- Occupations: Actor; composer; writer; singer
- Spouse: Ray McCutcheon (m. 1966–1978)

Micki Grant (born Minnie Louise Perkins, June 30, 1929 – August 22, 2021) was an American singer (soprano), actress, writer, and composer. She performed in Having Our Say (as Sadie Delaney), Tambourines to Glory and Jericho-Jim Crow both co-written by Langston Hughes, The Gingham Dog, Don't Bother Me, I Can't Cope, and received three Tony Award nominations for her writing.

== Early life ==
Perkins was born in Chicago, Illinois, to Gussie and Oscar Perkins on June 30, 1929. Some sources also state that she was born in 1941; Grant was said to have lowered her age early for reasons related to her career. Her father was a self-taught pianist and master barber, and her mother worked for Stanley Products. She began studying music with double-bass lessons at her elementary school. Grant first took piano lessons at the age of eight, and the next year took acting lessons with Susan Porché. After high school, her cousin, film actress Jeni Le Gon took her under her wing when Grant moved to Los Angeles. Following graduation from Englewood High School in Chicago, Grant studied at the Chicago School of Music and attended the University of Illinois, which she left after three years to move to New York City. Years later she went back to school and graduated from Lehman College in 1994 with a degree in English and Theatre, summa cum laude. In 2015, Lehman College awarded her the degree of Doctor of Fine Arts, honoris causa.

== Career ==
=== Theater ===
While in Los Angeles, she was cast in Fly Blackbird by James V. Hatch and C. Bernard Jackson. The show was successful and it moved to New York City. She graduated summa cum laude from Lehman College. In the early 1960s, she appeared off-Broadway in Jean Genet's The Blacks (with James Earl Jones and Cicely Tyson), and in Brecht on Brecht, in which she sang "Pirate Jenny". In 1964, Grant appeared as Ella Hammer in Howard da Silva's off-Broadway revival of Marc Blitzstein's The Cradle Will Rock, opposite Jerry Orbach and Rita Gardner.

Much of her early work was done with director Vinnette Carroll, the first African-American woman to direct on Broadway. They collaborated on Don't Bother Me, I Can't Cope, in which Grant starred and for which she wrote the music, book and lyrics, and Your Arms Too Short to Box with God, for which Grant wrote additional lyrics and music. Both enjoyed critical acclaim and long Broadway runs. She was a member of Delta Sigma Theta sorority.

=== Television ===
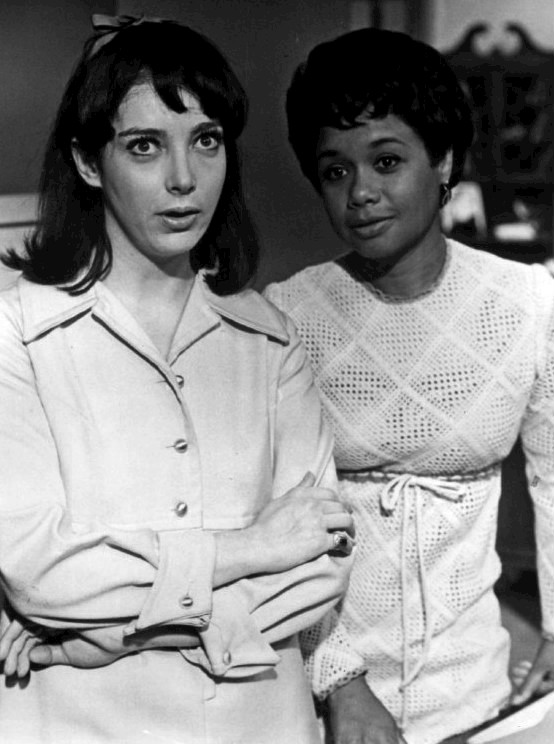
Grant (right) with Barbara Rodell on Another World, 1968

In the first story line written for an African-American in a daytime soap opera, Grant portrayed attorney Peggy Nolan on Another World (1966–1973). She later appeared on The Edge of Night replacing Billie Allen as Ada Chandler and was in the cast of Guiding Light (1982–1984). She also had a brief stint as host of Around the Corner, a children's show on CBS.

=== Radio ===
In her early days in New York City, Grant sought to supplement her income by working as a receptionist at a radio station. A meeting with a top executive at the station diverted her attention to working on the air. Readings and Writings featured Grant performing material that she compiled from research at a public library.

== Personal life and death ==
Grant married television news film editor Ray McCutcheon in 1966. They were married for 12 years before divorcing in 1978. Grant died on August 22, 2021, at the age of 92 in Manhattan, New York City.

== Stage credits ==
Year	Title	Role	Venue	Ref.
1963	Tambourines to Glory	Mariette Johnson	Broadway, Little Theatre	
1969	The Gingham Dog	Gloria (Standby)	Broadway, John Golden Theatre	
1972	Don't Bother Me, I Can't Cope	Performer, Bookwriter, Composer and Lyricist	Broadway, Playhouse Theatre	
1976	Your Arms Too Short to Box with God	Additional music and lyrics	Broadway, Lyceum Theatre	
1978	Working	Composer	Broadway, 46th Street Theatre	
1980	Your Arms Too Short to Box with God	Additional music and lyrics	Broadway revival, Ambassador Theatre	
1980	It's So Nice To Be Civilized	Bookwriter, Composer, Lyricist	Broadway, Martin Beck Theatre	
1982	Your Arms Too Short to Box with God	Additional music and lyrics	Broadway revival, Alvin Theatre	

== Awards and nominations ==
Award	Year	Category	Work	Result	Ref.
1972	Obie Awards	Outstanding Music and Lyrics	Don't Bother Me, I Can't Cope	Won	
1972	Drama Desk Awards	Outstanding Performance	Don't Bother Me, I Can't Cope	Won	
1972	Drama Desk Awards	Most Promising Lyricist	Don't Bother Me, I Can't Cope	Won	
1973	Tony Awards	Best Book of a Musical	Don't Bother Me, I Can't Cope	Nominated	
1973	Tony Awards	Best Original Score	Don't Bother Me, I Can't Cope	Nominated	
1978	Tony Awards	Best Original Score	Working	Nominated	
2013	Dramatist Guild Awards	Dramatists Guild Career Achievement Award		Won	

== Writing credits ==
- "Pink Shoe Laces" (1959), pop song, recorded by Dodie Stevens, reached number 3 on the U.S single charts. A Spanish-language version was number 1 in Mexico for 9 weeks.
- Don't Bother Me, I Can't Cope (1971), musical – music and lyrics, performer
- Croesus and the Witch (1971), musical – music and lyrics
- Step Lively, Boy (1973), musical – music and lyrics
- The Prodigal Sister (1974), musical – music and lyrics
- Your Arms Too Short to Box with God (1976), musical – additional music and lyrics
- The Ups and Downs of Theophilis Maitland (1976), musical – music and lyrics
- I'm Laughing but I Ain't Tickled (1976), musical – music and lyrics
- Alice (1978), musical – music and lyrics
- Working (1978), musical – music and lyrics with Stephen Schwartz, Craig Carnelia, James Taylor, Mary Rodgers and Susan Birkenhead
- Eubie! (1978), musical revue – additional lyrics
- It's So Nice to Be Civilized (1980), musical – book, music and lyrics
- Phillis (1986), musical – music and lyrics
- Step into My World (1989), revue – music and lyrics
- Carver (Don't Underestimate a Nut) (1996) – music, lyrics, and book
