= Industrial show =

An industrial show may refer to:

- Trade shows organized by one or more businesses to promote their products to potential buyers
- Industrial musicals performed for company employees for motivational purposes
