= The Rocky Horror Show =

1973 musical by Richard O'Brien

- 1974 poster at Kings Road Theatre
- Music: Richard O'Brien
- Lyrics: Richard O'Brien
- Book: Richard O'Brien
- Productions: 1973 West End; 1975 Broadway; 1990 West End revival; 2000 Broadway revival; 2023 West End revival; 2026 Broadway revival; Several national tours and international productions
- Awards: Evening Standard Award for Best Musical

The Rocky Horror Show is a musical with music, lyrics and book by Richard O'Brien. A humorous tribute to various B movies associated with the science fiction and horror genres from the 1930s to the early 1960s, the musical tells the story of a newly engaged couple getting caught in a storm and coming to the home of a mad transvestite scientist, Dr. Frank-N-Furter, unveiling his new creation, Rocky, a sort of Frankenstein-style monster in the form of an artificially made, fully grown, physically perfect muscle man.

The show was produced and directed by Jim Sharman. The original London production of the musical was premiered at the Royal Court Theatre (Upstairs) on 19 June 1973 (after two previews on 16 and 18 June 1973). It later moved to several other locations in London and closed on 13 September 1980. The show ran for a total of 2,960 performances in London and won the 1973 Standard Theatre Award for Best Musical. Songs in the musical include "Time Warp" and "Sweet Transvestite" (co-written by O'Brien and Richard Hartley), while the costumes were designed by Sue Blane. Its 1974 debut in the United States in Los Angeles had a successful nine-month run, but its 1975 Broadway debut at the Belasco Theatre lasted only three previews and forty-five showings, despite earning one Tony Award nomination and three Drama Desk nominations. Various international productions have since spanned across six continents as well as West End and Broadway revivals and eight UK tours. It was nominated for the 1991 Laurence Olivier Award for Best Musical Revival. Actor Tim Curry, who originated the role of Dr. Frank-N-Furter, became particularly associated with the musical.

The musical was adapted into the 1975 film The Rocky Horror Picture Show, starring O'Brien as Riff Raff, with Curry also reprising his role; the film has the longest-running release in film history. In 2016, it was adapted into the television film The Rocky Horror Picture Show: Let's Do the Time Warp Again. The musical was ranked eighth in a BBC Radio 2 listener poll of the "Nation's Number One Essential Musicals", and it was one of eight British musicals featured on a commemorative stamp issued by the Royal Mail in 2011.

The Rocky Horror Show has a cult following and influenced countercultural and sexual liberation movements that followed on from the 1960s. It was one of the first popular musicals to depict fluid sexuality during a time of division between generations and a lack of sexual difference acceptance. Like the film adaptation, the musical is noted for a long-running tradition of audience participation through call-back lines and attending dressed up as characters from the show. On the 50th anniversary of the musical in 2023, BBC News states that since debuting in London in 1973 the "production has been performed in 20 different languages" and been "seen by 30 million people globally".

== Background and original production ==
Original programme of the musical from the Theatre Upstairs at the Royal Court Theatre in London

Richard O'Brien wrote The Rocky Horror Show between acting jobs in the early 1970s. Since his youth, he had a passion for science fiction and B horror movies; he wanted to combine elements of the unintentional humour of B horror movies, the portentous dialogue of schlock-horror, aspects of Steve Reeves muscle films, transvestism and 1950s rock and roll into The Rocky Horror Show. He conceived and wrote the play during the glam rock fad in British popular culture and has said: "glam rock allowed me to be myself more".

O'Brien took a small portion of his unfinished draft of the show to Australian director Jim Sharman, who decided he wanted to direct it at the small experimental space Upstairs at the Royal Court Theatre in Sloane Square, Chelsea, London. Sharman had met O'Brien in London when he directed the first British stage production of Jesus Christ Superstar and had chosen O'Brien from the chorus to play King Herod for one stand-in performance. Tim Curry ran into O'Brien in London, who told Curry to talk to Sharman and gave him the script; Curry recalled thinking: "Boy, if this works, it's going to be a smash." The original creative team included costume designer Sue Blane and musical director Pete Moss. Michael White was brought in to produce the show. In rehearsal, the working title was They Came from Denton High, but it was changed just before previews at the suggestion of Sharman to The Rocky Horror Show.

After two previews, the show premiered without an interval at the Royal Court's 63-seat Theatre Upstairs on 19 June and ran until 20 July 1973. Curry, originating Dr. Frank-N-Furter, decided that the character should not be merely a drag queen, he should speak in the extravagantly posh accent of Britain's Queen. The cast also included Patricia Quinn, Nell Campbell (billed as Little Nell), Julie Covington, Christopher Malcolm and O'Brien, and the performances were given an all-out camp style. It was a creative, critical and commercial success. At the premiere a reviewer for The Guardian wrote: "it achieves the rare feat of being witty and erotic at the same time", and Curry gives a "garishly Bowiesque performance as the ambisextrous doctor." Record producer Jonathan King saw it on the second night and signed the cast to make the cast recording, The Rocky Horror Show Original London Cast, which was rushed out on his UK Records label. King was involved heavily in the initial promotion for the show and was the minority backer of it financially with White having a majority share.

The show's popularity allowed the production to transfer to the nearby 230-seat Chelsea Classic Cinema from 14 August to 20 October 1973. Rocky Horror found a long-term home at the 500-seat King's Road Theatre, another cinema, at 279 Kings Road, from 3 November 1973. The show received critical praise and won the 1973 Evening Standard Award for Best Musical. In February 1974, Robert Longden took over the role of Riff Raff from O'Brien in London. The production ended on 31 March 1979; it then transferred to the Comedy Theatre (now the Harold Pinter Theatre) in the West End to begin performances on 6 April 1979. Some restaging was needed, as the Comedy was Rocky Horror's first stage with a proscenium arch. For the first time, the musical was also broken into two acts with an interval. It finished its run there on 13 September 1980, making its 2,960th performance in London.

== Synopsis ==
=== Act I ===
The Usherette, sometimes referred to as "Trixie", who works in a derelict cinema, introduces tonight's "film" ("Science Fiction/Double Feature").

After attending the wedding of his best friend Ralph Hapschatt to Betty Munroe, Brad Majors confesses his love to Betty's friend Janet Weiss and the two become engaged ("Dammit Janet"). The Narrator explains that Brad and Janet are leaving Denton to visit Dr. Everett Scott, their former science tutor, while driving into a rainstorm. During the trip, their car has a flat tire and they are forced to walk through the rain to an old castle seeking a telephone ("Over at the Frankenstein Place"). The Narrator explains that Brad and Janet are feeling "apprehensive and uneasy". As they arrive rain-soaked, Riff Raff, the hunchbacked handyman and live-in butler, greets them with his sister Magenta, the maid. Riff Raff, Magenta and Columbia (a groupie) mention a delivery boy, Eddie, who fell victim to unfortunate circumstances after he botched a delivery; they then perform a vigorous dance number ("Time Warp"). Brad and Janet, alarmed, try to leave, but are stopped when Dr. Frank-N-Furter, a pansexual, cross-dressing mad scientist, makes an entrance. He introduces himself as "a sweet transvestite from Transsexual, Transylvania" and invites Brad and Janet up to his laboratory ("Sweet Transvestite"). Brad and Janet are stripped to their underwear to dry off.

In the laboratory, Frank-N-Furter gives Brad and Janet lab coats to wear. Frank announces that he has discovered the secret to creating life. He unveils his creation, a blond muscle man, Rocky, whom he brings to life. As his bandages are removed, Rocky appears anxious ("The Sword of Damocles"). Frank admires Rocky's physique in a tribute to bodybuilders ("Charles Atlas Song"/"I Can Make You a Man"). A Coca-Cola freezer in the laboratory opens to reveal Frank and Columbia's former lover, Eddie, a biker covered in surgical scars, who has been rendered a brain-damaged zombie. Intent on rescuing Columbia, Eddie rides crazily out of the freezer and causes extensive damage to Frank's laboratory ("Hot Patootie – Bless My Soul"). Frank panics, forces Eddie back into the freezer and hacks him to death with an axe. Frank tells Rocky – the recipient of half of Eddie's brain – that he prefers his physique to Eddie's, and so Eddie had to go ("Charles Atlas Song" (reprise)/"I Can Make You a Man" (reprise)). Brad and Janet, flustered after witnessing Eddie's brutal murder, are ushered to separate bedrooms.

=== Act II ===
The Narrator muses that Brad and Janet may be unsafe. Janet welcomes Brad's advances in her darkened bedroom before realising that it is Frank in disguise. He persuades Janet that pleasure is no crime; she asks him to promise not to tell Brad, and they resume making love. In Brad's darkened bedroom, Janet arrives to make love to Brad, who discovers that his lover is Frank in disguise. Frank promises not to tell Janet, and they resume, but Riff Raff interrupts on the television monitor with the message that Rocky has escaped. Janet searches for Brad in the laboratory and discovers Rocky hiding there. Checking the television monitor, Janet sees Brad in bed with Frank and seduces Rocky ("Touch-a, Touch-a, Touch-a, Touch Me"). The rest of the group discovers on the television monitor that Janet has slept with Rocky; Brad is hurt and angry ("Once in a While"). Riff Raff notifies Frank that there is another visitor entering the castle: Dr. Scott, the paraplegic science tutor whom Brad and Janet intended to visit.

Dr. Scott in a wheelchair is brought into the laboratory by Columbia, where Frank accuses him and Brad of spying on his castle, knowing that Dr. Scott has connections with the FBI. Dr Scott assures him that he has come in search of his nephew, Eddie ("Eddie's Teddy"). Frank displays Eddie's corpse to the group and then uses a device to electronically anchor the three visitors and a rebellious Rocky to the floor ("Planet Schmanet Janet"); the inhabitants of the castle are revealed to be space aliens led by Frank, who abandoned their original mission to engage in kinky sex with Earthlings and work on Rocky. Magenta insists that they return to their home planet now that they have been found out; Frank refuses and declares that it is time for a "floor show".

Under Frank's influence, Columbia, Rocky, Brad and Janet perform song and dance routines while clad in lingerie ("Rose Tint My World (Floor Show)"). Frank entices them to lose all inhibition and give in to their natural carnal instincts, and an orgy ensues ("Don't Dream It – Be It") before Frank leads them into the rousing finale of the floor show ("Wild and Untamed Thing"). Riff Raff and Magenta arrive abruptly, wearing spacesuits and carrying ray guns. Riff Raff declares that he is usurping Frank's authority and taking them all back to their home planet ("Transit Beam"). Frank makes a final plea for sympathy from Riff Raff, explaining his desire to spend his life having sex with Earthlings ("I'm Going Home"). Riff Raff is unmoved and guns down Columbia, Frank and Rocky before ordering Brad, Janet and Dr. Scott to leave.

As the trio evacuates the castle, Riff Raff and Magenta express their excitement to return to their world and do the "Time Warp" again with their fellow Transylvanians ("Spaceship"). Brad and Janet watch as the castle blasts off into outer space, confused about the implications of their sexual escapades, as the Narrator sums up ("Super Heroes"). The Usherette recounts the night's events ("Science Fiction/Double Feature" (reprise)).

== Musical numbers ==
- "Science Fiction/Double Feature" – Trixie
- "Dammit Janet" – Brad and Janet
- "Over at the Frankenstein Place" – Janet, Brad and Riff Raff
- "Time Warp" – Riff-Raff, Magenta, Columbia and the Narrator
- "Sweet Transvestite" – Frank and Company
- "The Sword of Damocles" – Rocky
- "I Can Make You a Man" – Frank
- "Hot Patootie" – Eddie
- "I Can Make You a Man" (reprise) – Frank
- "Touch-a, Touch-a, Touch-a, Touch Me" – Janet, Magenta and Columbia
- "Once in a While" – Brad
- "Eddie's Teddy" – Dr. Scott, Columbia and Company
- "Planet Schmanet" – Frank
- "Rose Tint My World/Don't Dream It, Be It/Wild and Untamed Thing" – Frank and Company
- "I'm Going Home" – Frank
- "Superheroes" – Company
- "Science Fiction/Double Feature" (reprise) – Trixie
- At the Chelsea Classic Cinema and King's Road Theatre, "I Can Make You a Man", a reprise of the same and "Eddie's Teddy" were added.

=== Variations ===
- In stage productions prior to 1990, "Sweet Transvestite" came before "Time Warp". This was changed for the film version and was subsequently updated for the stage version when O'Brien revised the script for the 1990 West End revival.
- "Charles Atlas Song" was replaced by a reworked version of the song, "I Can Make You a Man", for the film version. O'Brien's revision of the script in 1990 featured a hybrid of the two songs under the title "I Can Make You a Man", in the 1999 revised script this song was replaced by the film version, which continues to be used in all major productions. The reprise remains unchanged except for the title.

== Early productions ==
After the original London production, major early revivals included the following.

=== Los Angeles (1974) ===
Lou Adler was known for promoting experimental talent. In early 1973, Adler was in London and attended a performance of the show with Britt Ekland. He quickly secured the American theatrical rights. The show premiered at the Roxy Theatre in Los Angeles on 24 March 1974, running for nine months. The cast was all new, except for Curry, and consisted of Abigail Haness as Janet, Bill Miller as Brad, Bruce Scott as Riff-Raff, Jamie Donnelly as Magenta/Trixie, Boni Enten as Columbia, Meat Loaf as Eddie/Dr. Scott, Kim Milford as Rocky Horror and Graham Jarvis as the Narrator. Adler turned his nightclub into a playhouse. Meat Loaf remembered different celebrities who came to the show, resulting in him meeting Elvis Presley at a performance.

20th Century Fox executive Gordon Stulberg saw the show at the Roxy and agreed to invest $1 million in the film project. Paul Jabara played Dr. Frank-N-Furter when Curry left to film the movie. In early 1975, Adler closed the show at the Roxy Theatre after a ten-month run, and the actors returned to the UK to shoot the film.

=== Australia (1974–1977) ===
Harry M. Miller produced the first Sydney production of Rocky Horror, which opened on 19 April 1974 at the New Arts Cinema (later The Valhalla and now an office building) in Glebe. It starred Reg Livermore as Frank, Jane Harders as Janet, Kate Fitzpatrick as Usherette and Magenta, Arthur Dignam as Narrator, Sal Sharah as Riff-Raff, John Paramor as Brad, Graham Matters as Rocky, Maureen Elkner as Columbia, David Cameron as Eddie and Dr. Scott with Bob Hudson and Piero Von Arnam and Julie McGregor.

After eighteen months in Sydney, Miller's production moved to Melbourne, with Max Phipps taking over the lead role. It opened at the Regent Palace Theatre on 24 October 1975 and ran for 19 months and 458 performances, closing on 28 May 1977. It starred Max Phipps as Frank; Gregory Apps as Brad; Paula Maxwell as Janet; Tommy Dysart as narrator; Sal Sharah as Riff-Raff; Robyn Moase as Magenta; Sue Smithers as Columbia; Graham Matters as Rocky; and Terry Bader as Eddie/Dr Scott. The show transferred to Adelaide, opening on 12 August 1977 at The Warner Theatre. Phipps, Greentree, Millar, Dysart and Brockenshire reprised their roles. It was staged there by Roland Rocchiccioli. Other cast members included Tony Preece as Brad; Keith Reid as Riff-Raff; Bill Binks as Eddie/Dr. Scott; and Shane Bourne as Rocky. After several weeks, Jon Finlayson replaced the exhausted Phipps. Amid unfavorable reviews, the show closed in October 1977 after two months.

=== Broadway (1975) ===
Adler opened on Broadway just before the film's release. It was hoped that this production would be as successful as Jesus Christ Superstar and serve to promote the film. It was unsuccessful and closed after 45 performances. The Broadway cast was identical to that of the Roxy cast but with O'Brien in place of Scott as Riff-Raff.

=== San Francisco (1976) ===
The musical opened at the Montgomery Playhouse in San Francisco on 3 February 1976 and played 103 performances, closing on 30 May. The production was directed by A. Michael Amarino, with musical direction and arrangements by Michael Reno. The cast starred David James as Frank. with Roslyn Roseman as Trixie/Usherette/Magenta, Needa Greene as Janet, Robert Reynolds as Brad, Richard Gee as the Narrator, Buddy King as Riff Raff, Paula Desmond as Columbia, Bob Dulaney as Rocky and Emil Borelli as Eddie/Dr Scott.

== Subsequent productions ==
=== UK ===
On 8 August 1979 Leicester Haymarket Theatre presented the musical in association with Cameron Mackintosh and Michael White for a month-long run. A UK and Ireland tour followed, ending in December 1979. It starred Daniel Abineri as Frank, with Claire Lewis as Magenta/Usherette, Amanda Redman as Janet, Terence Hillyer as Brad, Nicholas Courtney as Narrator, Brett Forrest as Riff Raff, Dee Robillard as Columbia, Gary Martin as Rocky, Trevor Byfield as Eddie/Dr. Scott and Sarah Payne in the ensemble.

The first UK production outside London was at the Oldham Coliseum in January 1981. After occasional productions in the early 1980s, the musical began a UK tour at the Theatre Royal, Hanley, in 1984. The Oldham production and the 1984 tour both featured actor Jeffrey Longmore as Dr. Frank-N-Furter.

A 1990–91 West End revival ran at the Piccadilly Theatre. Subsequent tours were produced by Christopher Malcolm's, Richard O'Brien's and Howard Panter's Rocky Horror Company in the UK, Germany, South Africa and Buenos Aires amongst others.

Richard O'Brien's Rocky Horror Show completed its 2006–2007 tour on 14 July 2007 in Woking, Surrey after touring for almost eighteen months. The tour was directed by Christopher Luscombe and featured David Bedella as Frank. The 2006 tour cast, accompanied by Roger Lloyd-Pack as the Narrator and author O'Brien, performed "The Time Warp" live in Trafalgar Square on 22 July 2006 as part of The Big Dance event and was broadcast on BBC1's Dancing in the Street. The production was revived on tour, with Luscombe directing and some adjustments to the direction and designs. It opened on 17 September 2009 at the New Wimbledon Theatre and closed on 4 December 2010 at the newly opened Aylesbury Waterside Theatre; David Bedella reprised his role as Frank. The production was also revived in Seoul, South Korea, from August until October 2010 before a five-week New Zealand tour in November and December with Richard O'Brien as the Narrator.

On 3 May 2006, a benefit one-night concert version of the musical was staged in London at the Royal Court Theatre to raise money for Amnesty International. Entitled The Rocky Horror Tribute Show, it was hosted by O'Brien and featured Anthony Head and Michael Ball sharing the role of Frank-N-Furter, Ade Edmondson and Stephen Gately as Brad, Joanne Farrell and Sophie Lawrence as Janet, Kraig Thornber as Riff Raff, Toyah Willcox as Magenta, Amy Rosefield as Columbia, Gary Amers as Rocky, Ben Richards as Eddie, Julian Littman as Dr. Scott and Quinn reprising The Usherette. Christopher Biggins, Rayner Bourton, Robin Cousins, Steve Pemberton, Tony Slattery, Jamie Theakston and O'Brien served as the show's narrators, introducing each musical number. The concert also featured guest appearances from Campbell, and Kimi Wong, O'Brien's first wife, who appeared in the 1975 film adaptation. The concert was released on DVD by Kultur International Films in October 2008.

In December 2012, a year-long UK tour celebrated the show's 40th anniversary. Luscombe returned to direct the production, which starred Oliver Thornton as Frank, Ben Forster as Brad, Roxanne Pallett as Janet, Rhydian Roberts as Rocky, Philip Franks as The Narrator, Kristian Lavercombe reprised Riff Raff from previous tours, Abigail Jaye as Magenta/Usherette, Hine reprising Columbia and Joel Montague as Eddie/Dr Scott.

==== Rocky Horror Show Live ====
In September 2015, a UK tour began at the London Playhouse Theatre, and a performance was broadcast to cinemas across Europe and on the BBC in October 2015, with O'Brien as Narrator for London dates only. A charity gala night on 17 September at the Playhouse featured actors Stephen Fry, Anthony Head, Mel Giedroyc, Adrian Edmondson and singer Emma Bunton sharing the role of Narrator.

=== Australia and New Zealand ===
==== 1970s and 1980s ====
In 1978, the musical's first regional Australian production, directed by Terry O'Connell and Les Winspear, was staged by the Riverina Trucking Company (RTC) in the city of Wagga Wagga, where it played for three weeks. The cast featured Terry O'Connell as Frank, Bob Baines as Narrator, Kim Hillas as Usherette, Lynne Erskine as Janet, Toby Prentice as Brad, Myles O'Meara as Riff Raff, Janette Crowe as Magenta, Elaine Mangan as Columbia, Les Winspear as Rocky and Ken Moffat as Eddie/Dr. Scott. In 1981, director Peter Barclay's new interpretation of the RTC production opened on 22 July 1981 at Civic Theatre, Wagga Wagga. The cast included O'Connell reprising Frank, Annie Stanford as Janet, Paul Minifie as The Narrator, Baines again as Riff Raff, and Wayne Pygram as Rocky. The same year, a New Zealand tour featured Gary Glitter as Frank, Jenni Anderson as Janet, John Collingwood-Smith as Brad, Sal Sharah as Riff-Raff (reprising his role in the first Australian run), Sharron Skelton as Magenta/Usherette, Clare Elliott (under the stage name "Zero") as Columbia, Paul Johnstone as Eddie/Dr. Scott, Rayner Bourton reprising Rocky and Keith Richardson as The Narrator.

A touring production of The Rocky Horror Show opened 6 October 1981 at the Theatre Royal, Sydney and stopped at Melbourne, Canberra, Perth and Adelaide, among others. It closed in Brisbane in October 1982. David Toguri, choreographer for the 1975 film adaptation, directed and choreographed. The cast featured Abineri reprising Frank, Antoinette Byron as Janet, David Frezza as Brad, Perry Bedden as Riff Raff, Kerry Myers as Magenta/Usherette, Gina Mendoza as Columbia, Steve J. Spears as Eddie/Dr. Scott (replaced by Ignatius Jones after the Sydney run) and Jay Hackett as Rocky. The Narrator was shared among Stuart Wagstaff, Ian "Molly" Meldrum (in Melbourne) and Noel Ferrier (in Adelaide). In 1984 a tour with the same producer, Wilton Morley, celebrated the tenth anniversary of the original Australian production again starred Abineri as Frank, who also directed. In Brisbane and Sydney, Reg Livermore, reprised Frank, with Anne Looby as Janet, David Garrett as Brad, David Wheeler as Riff Raff, Suzanne Dudley as Magenta/Usherette, Jill Watt as Columbia, Wayne Pygram as Eddie/Dr. Scott, Ray Coughlin as Rocky and Stuart Wagstaff as Narrator.

Peter Batey directed a rural tour, starring Joe Daniels as Frank, from August to November 1985. The cast included Russell Morris as Riff Raff, Maria Mercedes as Magenta, Ken James as Brad, Victoria Nicolls as Janet, Glenn Shorrock as Eddie/Dr. Scott, Margaret Coyne as Columbia and Matthew Watters as Rocky.

The Morley production was revived in 1986, with Abineri again as both director and Frank, beginning in New Zealand. The cast included Andrew Binns as Brad, Ann Wilson as Janet, Andrea Cunningham as Magenta/Usherette, Rachel King as Columbia and Russell Crowe as Eddie/Dr. Scott. For a brief stint, former New Zealand Prime Minister Robert Muldoon appeared as the Narrator. The following year, the production transferred to the Princess Theatre (later the Comedy Theatre) in Melbourne, Australia, for an eight-month run, and then toured Australia and New Zealand until December 1988, still with Abineri as Frank (later Morley and Simon Westaway), alongside Megan Shapcott as Janet, Simon Westaway as Brad, David Wheeler as Riff Raff, Lyn Shakespeare as Magenta/Usherette, Michelle Argue as Columbia, Steve Bastoni as Rocky, and Wagstaff, Gordon Chater and others as The Narrator. Other replacements included Bob Baines as Riff Raff and Bernard King and later Billy T. James as Narrator. It was the last production based on the original script and set design, before readaptation for the 1990 UK West End revival.

==== 1990s and 2000s ====
In 1992, a revival was launched by producer Paul Dainty titled The New Rocky Horror Show. Directed and designed by Nigel Triffitt, it toured Australia beginning at the Melbourne Comedy Theatre on 2 July 1992, with soap stars Craig McLachlan as Frank (later Marcus Graham), Gina Riley as Janet (later Ally Fowler), Stephen Kearney as Brad (later Glenn Butcher), Linda Nagle as Magenta/ Usherette, Peter Rowsthorn as Riff Raff, Alyssa-Jane Cook as Columbia, Wilbur Wilde as Eddie/Dr. Scott (later Frankie J Holden), Christopher Kirby as Rocky and Red Symons as The Narrator. This production was revived in 1996 for another tour beginning in February at the Lyric Theatre in Brisbane, with Graham, Butcher, Rowsthorn, Wilde and Symons reprising their roles and Kym Wilson as Janet, Lucy Briant as Magenta, Jo Beth Taylor as Columbia and Usherette and Ron Reeve as Rocky. In Perth, Jason Donovan played Frank. Other replacements included Jane Turner as Janet, Annie Jones as Columbia/Usherette, George Kapiniaris as Eddie/Dr. Scott and Kamahl as Narrator. It was again revived the following year for a tour of Hong Kong, featuring Dale Ryder as Frank, Lucy Briant as Janet, Geoff Paine as Brad, George Kapiniaris as Riff Raff, Jenny Vuletic as Magenta//Usherette, Hali Gordon as Columbia, Michael-John Hurney as Eddie/Dr. Scott Ron Reeve as Rocky and Harry Wong as Narrator. It was revived in July 1998 at Sydney's Star City Casino to celebrate the musical's 25th anniversary. The cast featured Tim Ferguson as Frank, Tottie Goldsmith as Janet, Dee Smart as Columbia/Usherette and Jennifer Vuletic as Magenta/Usherette, while Butcher, Rowsthorn, Wilde, Reeve and Symons reprised their roles.

From 2 November to 28 November 2004, a revival of The Rocky Horror Show was staged at the Twelfth Night Theatre in Brisbane, directed byTony Alcock and produced by On the Boards Theatre Company. The cast featured Stefan Cooper-Fox as Frank, Crystal Taylor as Janet, Brad Kendrick as Brad, Venessa Crowley as Magenta and The Usherette, Graham Moore as Riff Raff, Jacy Lewis as Columbia, David Knijnenburg as Eddie and Dr. Scott and Steven Tandy as The Narrator. The same month, the cast of the Australian soap opera Neighbours staged a benefit concert, to raise money for the Variety Club Australia and the Taralye School for Deaf Children. The concert starred Maria Mercedes as Frank, Alan Fletcher as Brad, Natalie Bassingthwaighte (who also produced the show) as Janet, Brett Swain as Riff Raff, Marcella Russo as Magenta, Marisa Warrington as Columbia, Bernard Curry as Eddie, Terence Donovan as Dr. Scott, Blair McDonough as Rocky, Ian Smith as The Narrator and Natalie Blair as the Usherette. The concert was repeated at the Regent Theatre in Melbourne. The event raised $200,000 for the charities.

Gale Edwards staged a revival at the Star Theatre in Sydney, where it played from 12 February to 30 March 2008. The production starred iOTA as Frank, Kellie Rhode as Janet, Andrew Bevis as Brad, Tamsin Carroll as Magenta and the usherette, Paul Capsis as Riff Raff, Sharon Millerchip as Columbia (winning a Helpmann Award for Best Female Actor in a Supporting Role in a Musical), Michael Cormick as Eddie and Dr. Scott, Simon Farrow as Rocky and John Waters as The Narrator. The revival transferred to the Comedy Theatre in Melbourne, where it played from September 2008 to March 2009). Gretel Killeen and later Derryn Hinch were replacements as The Narrator.

==== 2010s to present ====
A 40th anniversary Australian tour starred McLachlan reprising Frank, with Tim Maddren as Brad, Christie Whelan Browne as Janet, Ashlea Pyke as Columbia, Erika Heynatz as Magenta/Usherette, Nicholas Christo as Eddie/Dr. Scott, Brendan Irving as Rocky and Tony Farrell as the Narrator. Lavercombe reprised Riff Raff. The tour played in Brisbane at the Queensland Performing Arts Centre from 10 January to 9 February 2014, Perth's Crown Theatre from 16 February to 9 March and the Adelaide Festival Centre from 20 March to 13 April 2014. The performance then transferred to the Melbourne Comedy Theatre from 23 April to 22 June 2014. It took a break before transferring to the Sydney Lyric Theatre from 15 April to 7 June 2015 with Stephen Mahy replacing Brad and Bert Newton as the Narrator and returned to the Melbourne Comedy Theatre from 12 June to 19 July 2015. O'Brien took over the role of the Narrator in Adelaide and for a week in Melbourne. In December 2017, an encore tour began in Adelaide. McLachlan briefly reprised Frank, but left the production when it was alleged that in 2014 he sexually assaulted three female cast members. Adam Rennie took over the role in Adelaide, Brisbane and Sydney, and Todd McKenney played Frank in Melbourne.

The 50th anniversary Australian tour began in February 2023 at the Theatre Royal, Sydney, starring Jason Donovan as Frank and Myf Warhurst as The Narrator. They alternated with David Bedella as Frank Nicholas Hammond as The Narrator. other cast members were Stellar Perry as Magenta/Usherette, Henry Rollo as Riff Raff, Ethan Jones as Brad, Deirdre Khoo as Janet, Loredo Malcolm as Rocky, Darcey Eagle as Columbia and Eliis Dolan as Eddie/Dr Scott. On April 19, O'Brien attended the production's 50th-anniversary opening night gala at the Adelaide Festival Centre, sharing the role of Narrator with Warhurst.

=== European productions ===
==== Belgium and Netherlands ====
From 29 April to 10 June 1978, the first Belgian production of The Rocky Horror Show was staged at Teater Arena Ghent. The cast featured Daan Van den Durpel as Frank, Linda Lepomme as Janet, Marijn Devalck as Brad, Wim Huys as Riff-Raff, Carmen Jonckheere as Magenta/Usherette, Chris Thys as Columbia, Jakob Beks as Eddie/Dr. Scott, Paul Codde as Rocky and Bert Van Tichelen as The Narrator. The libretto was translated by Hugo Heinen and Rene Solleveld. It was directed by Jaak Van de Velde, with choreography by Lilly De Munter and decor and costumes by Jacques Berwouts. It was remounted at the same venue from 19 November 1983 to 7 January 1984. Van den Durpel and Devalck reprised their roles, with Norma Hendy as Janet, Karel Deruwe as Riff Raff, Daisy Haegeman as Magenta/Usherette, Annick Christiaens as Columbia, Jan de Bruyne as Eddie/Dr. Scott, Jo De Backer as Rocky and David Davidse as The Narrator. The production team again included Van de Velde and Berwouts, with choreography by Van Den Durpel.

A Dutch-language version on 18 March 1976 at the Cinema Royal in Nieuwendijk, Amsterdam. Produced by René Solleveld, who also served as co-translator with Hugo Heinen and directed by Derek Goldby; it was choreographed by Serge-Henri Valcke, with decor and costumes by Bob Ringwood. Hugo Metsers sas Frank, with Trudy de Jong as Janet, Derek de Lint as Brad, Hans Beijer as Riff-Raff, Moniek Toebosch as Magenta/Usherette, Thea Ranft as Columbia, Robert Funcke as Eddie/Dr. Scott, Peter van de Wouw as Rocky and Jan Staal as The Narrator. The show ran for one month.

==== Scandinavia ====
The musical opened at the Gladsaxe Theater in Copenhagen, Denmark, on 28 September 1974. The cast featured Willy Rathnov as Frank, Kirsten Peüliche as Janet, Eddie Skoller as Brad, Jesper Klein as Riff-Raff, Lykke Nielsen as Magenta/Usherette, Lisbet Lundquist as Columbia, Otto Brandenburg as Eddie/Dr. Scott, Bent Warburg as Rocky and Jørgen Buckhøj as The Narrator. It was revived twice under the direction of Per Pellesen, at the Aalborg Theater, Jutland in 1992 and at the Nørrebros Theater, Copenhagen in 2003.

The musical played from 11 October 1977 at the Oslo Nye Centralteatret in Oslo, Norway, directed by David Toguri, with translation into Norwegian by Johan Fillinger and Ole Paus. The show drew criticism that it reflected the decline of morality in the country, but it ran for 129 performances before closing on 18 March 1978. The cast featured Knut Husebø as Frank, Kari Ann Grønsund as Janet, Ivar Nørve as Brad, Jahn Teigen as Riff-Raff, Gro Anita Schønn as Magenta and The Usherette, Julie Ege as Columbia, Per Elvis Granberg as Eddie, Egil Åsman as Dr. Scott, Zakhir Helge Linaae as Rocky and Bjarne Bø as The Narrator.

The musical returned to Oslo in 2000 at the Centralteatret, directed by Tony Totino in English. It was revived again in 2025 at Centralteatret, directed by Heiki Riipinen. Frank was played by Adrian Angelico played Frank, Riff-Raff by Gunnar Eiriksson, Rocky by Daniel "Diesel" Soheili and Magenta by Trine Wenberg Svensen, who played the same role in 2000.

==== France, Germany and Spain ====
A French-language version of the musical was staged at the Théâtre de la Porte Saint-Martin, Paris, in 1975. The production was by Jean-Pierre Reyes and Michael White, with a French translation by Javier Arroyuelo and Rafael Lopez Sanchez; the lyrics were translated by Alain Boublil. It was directed by Pierre Spivakoff, with sets and costumes by Elisabeth Saurel and choreography by Victor Upshaw. Pierre Spivakoff was Frank, with Nathalie Brehal as Janet, Roger Mirmont as Brad (renamed Paul), Gérard Surugue as Riff-Raff, Myriam Mézières as Magenta/The Usherette, Celia Booth as Columbia, Ticky Holgado as Eddie/Dr. Scott, Jeffrey Kime as Rocky, Geoffrey Carey as The Narrator.

Walter Bockmayer directed the first German production in Essen, opening on 20 January 1980 at the Grillo-Theater, set in a sterile hospital and featuring time travel. Decoven C. Washington was the first black actor to star as Frank. The cast featured Rotraut Rieger as Janet, Detlev Greisner as Brad, Fritz Brieserheister as Riff-Raff, Jutta Bryde as Magenta, Sue Hürzeler as Columbia, Yoyo Petit as Eddie, Manfried Hilbig as Dr. Scott, Till Krabbe as Rocky, Siegfried Wittig as Narrator and Helmut Fülberth as Usherette. The same year a production was imported from England by Cameron Mackintosh, which ran in October/November. Jeff Shankley was Frank-N-Furter, with Philip Bretherton as Brad, Perry Bedden as Riff-Raff, Trevor Byfield as Eddie/Dr. Scott and Nicholas Courtney as The Narrator.

The first Spanish staging was in Madrid from September 1974 to July 1975, directed by Gil Carretero. The translation was by Juan José Plans and Roberto Estevez, which toned down the profanity in response to censorship during the Franco Franco Regime but still garnered criticism. The cast featured Alfonso Nadal as Frank, Flora Maria Alvaro as Janet (renamed Sibilia), Miguel Angel Godo as Brad (renamed Thiero), Alberto Berco as The Narrator, Pedro Mari Sanchez as Rocky, Ricardo Zabala as Riff Raff, Raquel Ramirez as Columbia, Adolfo Rodriguez as Eddie/Dr. Scott and Mayra Gómez Kemp as Magenta/ Usherette. The show played at Cerebro Music Hall as an adults-only event at 11:00 pm. Saturday nights also included a 1:00 am showing. The show ran at the La Discoteca Cerebro and then the Teatro Valle-Inclán in 1975.

A Catalan language version directed by Ventura Pons and produced by Jordi Morell opened on 4 March 1977 at Teatro Romea in Barcelona, Spain. It was translated by Narcissus Comadira. Oriol Tramvia was Frank, with Maria Cinta as Janet (renamed Anna), Jordi Ponti as Brad (renamed Ramon), Guillem Paris as Riff Raff, Christa Leem as Magenta and The Usherette, Dolores Laffite as Columbia, Enric Pous as Eddie/Dr. Scott, Pau Bizarro as Rocky, Biel Moll as The Narrator.

==== European tours ====
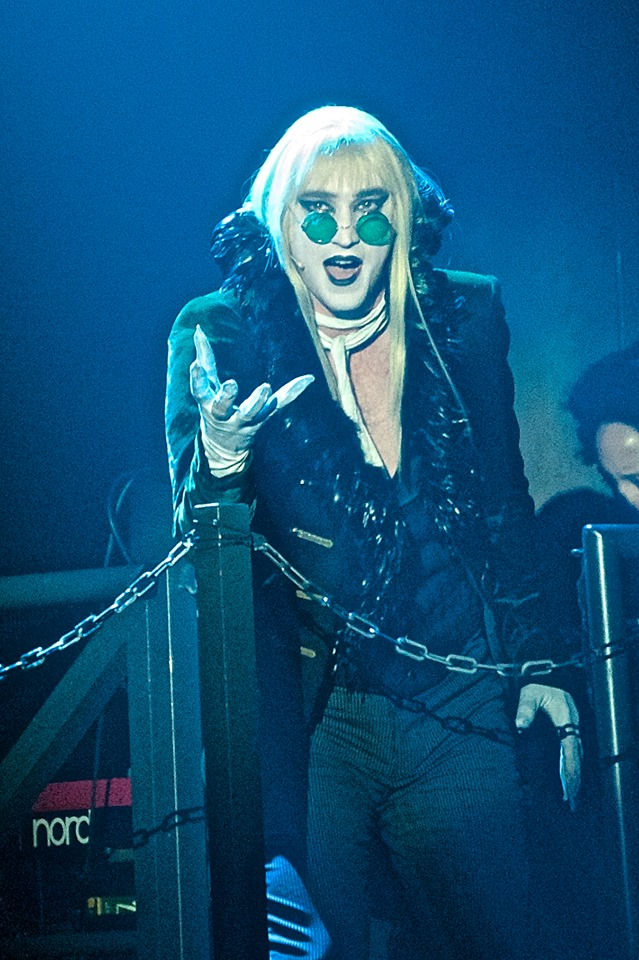
Stuart Matthew Price as Riff Raff in a European tour

Directed by Christopher Malcolm (the original Brad), choreographed by Stacey Haynes and co-produced with BC&E German Producers, a 1996–2005 European tour starred Bob Simon/William E. Lester/Paul Pecorino as Frank, with David Schmittou as Brad, Ellen Hoffman as Janet Weiss Amanda-Jane Manning; Caroline Liadakis/Jo Gibb/Lisa Boucher as Columbia; Sherry Hart/Lydia Taylor/Karin Inghammar as Magenta; David Nehls/Gene Dante/Brenden Lovett as Riff Raff, David Velarde as Rocky, Ted Anderson as Eddie/Dr. Scott and Hans B. Goetzfried as The Narrator. A cast album CD was released by Lava Records/Polymedia International Music Service, recorded in January 1996 at the Livingstone Studios in London.

The 2008–2009 European tour began at the Admiralspalast Theater in Berlin, Germany, in November 2008. Rob Morton Fowler was Frank, with Ceri-Lyn Cissone as Janet, Chris Ellis-Stanton as Brad, Stuart Matthew Price as Riff Raff, Maria Franzen as Magenta, Kerry Winter as Columbia, Jack Edwards as Eddie/Dr. Scott and Andrew Gordon-Watkins as Rocky. The 2014-2015 European tour began at the Lanxess Arena in Cologne, Germany, in October 2014. Rob Morton Fowler was Frank, with Harriet Bunton as Janet, David Ribi as Brad, Price again as Riff Raff, Hannah Cadec as Columbia, Maria Franzén as Magenta, Vincent Gray as Rocky and Charles Brunton as Eddie/Dr. Scott. A European tour commenced in Cologne in October 2017, visiting venues across Germany and Italy before ending in Hanover in April 2018. Gary Tushaw was Frank; with Sophie Isaacs as Janet, Felix Mosse as Brad, Price reprising Riff Raff, Anna Lidman as Magenta, Holly Atterton as Columbia, Ryan Goscinski as Rocky and Daniel Fletcher as Eddie / Dr. Scott.

=== U.S. productions ===
==== 1970s to 2000s ====
From January to March 1985, a regional production of The Rocky Horror Show opened at the Westport Playhouse in St. Louis, Missouri. Produced by Wesley Van Tassel and directed by Fred Goodson, the show featured Wendy O. Williams as Magenta. The cast also included Jeffrey Griglak (Frank), Austin Murphy (Brad), Terri Sorenson (Janet), James Killion (Riff-Raff), Peggy Taphorn (Columbia), Lee Raines (Rocky), Scott Harlan (Eddie/Dr. Scott) and James Paul (Narrator). The show earned good reviews; Joe Pollack of the St. Louis Post-Dispatch called it "one of the finest productions in the theater's history," highlighting Fred Goodson's direction, the ensemble's vocal performances and the interactive audience participation.

In December 1978, the musical was staged for eleven nights at the Westbury Music Festival in Jericho, New York. The cast featured Justin Ross as Frank, Kristen Meadows as Janet, Stephan Burns as Brad, Richard Casper as Riff-Raff, Diane Duncan as Magenta and Trixie, the Westbury Popcorn Girl (a version of The Usherette), Kitty Preston as Columbia, Robert Zanfini as Eddie and Dr. Scott, Michael Hawke as Rocky and Randolph Walker as The Narrator. A North America tour in 1980 cast featured Frank Gregory as Frank, Marcia Mitzman as Janet, Frank Piergo as Brad, Pendleton Brown as Riff Raff, Lorelle Brina as Magenta, Meghan Duffy as Trixie, C. J. Critt as Columbia, Kim Milford as Rocky and Steve Lincoln as the Narrator.

A Broadway revival ran from October 2000 to January 2002 at the Circle in the Square Theatre, directed by Christopher Ashley, featured Tom Hewitt (later Terrence Mann) as Frank, Alice Ripley as Janet, Jarrod Emick (also Luke Perry) as Brad, Raúl Esparza (later Sebastian Bach) as Riff Raff, Joan Jett (later Ana Gasteyer) as Columbia/Usherette, Lea DeLaria as Eddie/Dr. Scott and Daphne Rubin-Vega as Magenta. The Narrator was Dick Cavett (with replacements including Kate Clinton, Gilbert Gottfried, TV hosts Sally Jesse Raphael, Robin Leach, Dave Holmes and Jerry Springer, magicians Penn & Teller and columnist Cindy Adams. Following 9/11, ticket sales fell sharply. The revival received nominations for four Tony Awards including best revival of a musical.

==== 2010s–present ====
In October 2010, Kenny Ortega directed a benefit concert to celebrate the musical's 35th anniversary. The one-night only event at the Wiltern Theatre in Los Angeles featured Julian McMahon as Frank, Matthew Morrison as Brad, Lea Michele (Act 1) and Nicole Scherzinger (Act 2) as Janet, Scherzinger as The Usherette, Evan Rachel Wood as Magenta, Lucas Grabeel as Riff Raff, Melora Hardin as Columbia, Jorge Garcia as Eddie, George Lopez as Dr. Scott, Mike Breman as Rocky, and Jack Nicholson and Danny DeVito sharing The Criminologist. Curry and Bostwick joined the cast for an encore of "The Time Warp". The proceeds went to the charity The Painted Turtle, a California camp for children with chronic or life-threatening illnesses.

The musical was staged at Salem's Historic Grand Theatre in Oregon by Enlightened Theatrics to coincide with the 45th anniversary, from 9 October through 3 November 2019. It starred Rhansen Mars as Frank, Neely Golightly as Riff Raff, Margo Schembre as Magenta and Cassandra Pangelinan as Columbia. America's first openly transgender mayor, Stu Rasmussen, moderated post-show talk backs with the cast.

From October to December 2023, the show was produced with a majority transgender and nonbinary production team and cast at Central Square Theater (CST) in Cambridge, Massachusetts. The musical was co-directed by Lee Mikeska Gardner (CST's Artistic Director) and Jo Michael Rezes for the 50th anniversary of the musical's London debut.

Roundabout Theatre Company's Broadway revival directed by Sam Pinkleton at Studio 54 opened 23 April 2026. The cast includes Luke Evans as Frank, Stephanie Hsu as Janet, Andrew Durand as Brad, Juliette Lewis as Magenta, Michaela Jaé Rodriguez as Columbia, Harvey Guillen as Eddie/Dr. Scott, Rachel Dratch as the Narrator, Josh Rivera as Rocky and Amber Gray as Riff Raff. The revival was nominated for nine Tony Awards, including Best Revival of a Musical.

=== Canada ===
The Actors' Stage Company staged the first Canadian production at the Ryerson Theatre in Toronto. The cast included Brent Carver as Frank, Kim Cattrall as Janet, Ross Douglas as Brad, Louis Negin (who directed) as Riff-Raff and Tabby Johnson as Columbia. The show ran from 29 June to 17 July 1976.

The Stratford Festival presented the musical in 2018. Choreographed and directed by Donna Feore, it played from April to December, becoming the longest running production in the Festival's history.

=== Latin American ===
==== Brazil ====
In February 1975, The Rocky Horror Show made its debut at Teatro da Praia in Rio de Janeiro, Brazil. The libretto was translated by Jorge Mautner, Joe Rodrix and Kao Rossman, with adaptations to suit Brazilian audiences. As the Hollywood horror and sci-fi films that the musical references were not well known in Brazil, local cultural references were substituted. For example, the reference to Faye Wray was changed to the Brazilian samba singer Carmen Miranda. The cast featured Eduardo Conde as Frank, Diana Strella as Janet, Wolf Maya as Brad, Tom Zé as Riff-Raff, Betina Viany as Magenta, Vera Setta as Columbia, Zé Rodrix as Eddie and Dr. Scott, Acácio Gonçalves as Rocky, Nildo Parente as The Narrator and Lucélia Santos as Baleira.

In 2016, a revival in São Paulo was directed and produced by Charles Möeller and Cláudio Botelho. The cast included Marcelo Médici (Frank), Bruna Guerin (Janet), Felipe de Carolis (Brad), Gottsha (Magenta/Usherette), Thiago Machado (Riff Raff), Jana Amorim (Columbia), Nicola Lama (Eddie / Dr. Scott), Felipe Mafra (Rocky) and Marcel Octavio (Narrator) with Vanessa Costa and Thiago Garça (Ghosts). Shortly before the opening, Botelho was criticised for posting transphobic and homophobic comments on his personal Facebook page. Botelho stated that his comments were a joke.

==== Argentina ====
In July 1975, Héctor Cavallero and Leonardo Barujel produced the musical at Teatro Pigalle in Buenos Aires, Argentina. The show was directed by Gil Carretero, who also produced and directed the Madrid production, and the translation by Jorge Schussheim. The cast featured Osvaldo Alé as Frank, Valeria Lynch as Janet (renamed Sibila), Ricardo Pald as Brad (Ciero), Sergio Villar as Riff-Raff, Linda Peretz as Magenta / Usherette (Acomodadora), Anna Maria Cores as Columbia, Carlos Wibratt as Eddie and Dr. Scott, Eddie Sierra (aka Yeffry) as Rocky and Rolo Puente as The Narrator. Martha Hendrix and Enrique Quintanilla (Fantasmas). The show opened at a cabaret-style venue. A few days later, unknown assailants threw a Molotov cocktail at the theater, which aimed to cause casualties. A minor fire did not damage the hall, and the show continued, running for three months.

In August 2016 and again in 2017, a revival ran in Buenos Aires at the Teatro Maipo, directed by Andie Say. The translation was by Marcelo Kotliar. The cast was led by Roberto Peloni (Frank),with Melania Lenoir (Trixie/Magenta), Federico Coates (Riff Raff), Maia Contreras (Eddie/Dr. Scott), Nacho Pérez Cortés (Rocky), Micaela Pierani Méndez (Columbia), Sofía Rangone (Janet) and Walter Bruno (Brad). The Criminologist was portrayed by such local entertainment figures: Marcos Mundstock, Aníbal Pachano, Diego Ramos, Peter Lanzani, Víctor Laplace and Moria Casán.

==== Mexico and Panama ====
The first Mexican production, in March 1976, was translated and produced by Julissa in the Versailles hall of the now defunct Hotel of the Prado. It transferred to Teatro Venustiano Carranza.The cast featured Julissa as Janet (renamed Chelo), Gonzalo Vega as Frank, Hector Ortiz as Brad (Carlos), Luis Tomer as Riff-Raff, Paloma Zozaya as Magenta and Usherette, Norma Lendech as Columbia, Lauro Pavón as Eddie and Dr. Scott (Carrillo), Cecil Goudie as Rocky and Manuel Gurria as Narrator. A cast recording was released. Julissa presented a revival in 1986.

The English community Theatre Guild of Ancon presented the show directed by Melanie Gilpin (Lee) from 24 October to 2 November 2013.

=== Asia ===
==== Japan ====
The first Japan production was presented by Walking Elephants Ltd. from June to September 1975 in Tokyo and Osaka, at the Miyakezaka Hall in Akasaka, Tokyo. Directed by Christie Dickason, the English cast starred Trevor Byfield as Frank, with Christopher Malcolm and Belinda Sinclair as Brad and Janet, Rayner Bourton reprising Rocky, Peter Bayliss as The Narrator, Judith Lloyd as Columbia, Caroline Noh as Magenta/Usherette, Desmond McNamara as Riff-Raff and Neil McCaul as Eddie/Dr. Scott. A Japanese tour followed, and single recordings of "Sweet Transvestite" performed by Byfield and "Touch-a, Touch-a, Touch-a, Touch Me" by Sinclair were released.

In 1976 Walking Elephants presented an encore tour directed by David Toguri. The cast starred Martin Asscher as Frank, Deirdre Dee as Janet, Derek Beard as Brad, John Dicks as Riff-Raff, Tina Jones as Magenta/Usherette, Jeannie Mc'Artur as Columbia, Peter Dawson as Eddie/Dr. Scott, James Smith as The Narrator and Rayner Bourton returning as Rocky.

==== Singapore and Korea ====
Based on the 2009–10 UK Tour and following runs in South Korea and New Zealand in 2010, Christopher Luscombe's touring production ended at the Esplanade Theatre, Singapore, in January 2012. The international cast was joined by Hossan Leong as the Narrator, and Kara Lane and Daniela Valvano respectively reprised Magenta/Usherette and Phantom. A 1993 production in Singapore been toned down to avoid giving offence there. The film adaptation was banned in Singapore until 2003.

In August 2010, a revival based on the 2009–10 UK Tour opened in Seoul, South Korea starring Juan Jackson as Frank and Kristian Lavercombe as Riff Raff with an international cast. Following the seven-week run the production toured New Zealand in November 2010 with O'Brien as the Narrator.

== Legacy ==
"I think it's popular because it's always been ahead of its time. And I think now it's preaching a sentiment that is very popular with audiences, which is to be yourself."

— Rocky Horror veteran Kristian Lavercombe speaking to BBC News in 2023 on the show's 50th anniversary.

Beyond its cult status, The Rocky Horror Show is also widely hailed, alongside other experimental theatre works such as Hair, to have been an influence on the countercultural and sexual liberation movements that followed on from the 1960s. It was one of the first popular musicals to depict fluid sexuality during a time of division between generations and a lack of sexual difference acceptance.

As a result, the show received "a mauling from New York-based critic Rex Reed, who said the production 'was only for homosexuals'". However, O'Brien stated that it is rather a celebration of difference that allows marginalized communities to gather and coexist. Unlike Reed, other critics would suggest that "though many people might laugh at the notion, Rocky Horror is in many ways a serious musical and a serious social document".

The musical was ranked eighth in a BBC Radio 2 listener poll of the "Nation's Number One Essential Musicals". The Rocky Horror Show was one of eight UK musicals featured on Royal Mail stamps, issued in February 2011. In January 2023, it was announced that there would be an NFT collection to celebrate the 50th anniversary of the stage show's first appearance.

== Casts ==
Character	London	Broadway	West End Revival/ UK Tour	Broadway Revival	West End Revival/UK Tour	Broadway Revival
Character	1973	1975	1990–1991	2000	2024–2026	2026
Frank-N-Furter	Tim Curry (Note: Reprised the role in the 1975 film The Rocky Horror Picture Show)	Tim Curry	Tim McInnerny Anthony Head	Tom Hewitt	Jason Donovan Stephen Webb Adam Strong	Luke Evans
Janet Weiss	Julie Covington Belinda Sinclair	Abigale Haness	Gina Bellman	Alice Ripley	Lauren Chia	Stephanie Hsu
Brad Majors	Christopher Malcolm	Bill Miller	Adrian Edmondson Craig Ferguson	Jarrod Emick	Connor Carson	Andrew Durand
Riff Raff	Richard O'Brien	Richard O'Brien	Edward Tudor-Pole	Raúl Esparza	Job Greuter	Amber Gray
Magenta	Patricia Quinn (Note: Reprised the role of Magenta in The Rocky Horror Picture Show)	Jamie Donnelly	Kate O'Sullivan; Mary Maddox	Daphne Rubin-Vega	Natasha Hoeberigs	Juliette Lewis
Trixie	Patricia Quinn	Jamie Donnelly	Kate O'Sullivan; Mary Maddox	Daphne Rubin-Vega	Natasha Hoeberigs	Juliette Lewis
Columbia	Nell Campbell	Boni Enten	Linda Davidson	Joan Jett	Jayme-Lee Zanoncelli	Michaela Jaé Rodriguez
Rocky Horror	Rayner Bourton	Kim Milford	Adam Caine	Sebastian LaCause	Morgan Jackson	Josh Rivera
Eddie	Paddy O'Hagan	Meat Loaf (Note: Reprised the role of Eddie in The Rocky Horror Picture Show)	Gordon Kennedy Ivan Kaye	Lea DeLaria	Edward Bullingham	Harvey Guillén
Dr Everett Scott	Paddy O'Hagan	Meat Loaf	Gordon Kennedy Ivan Kaye	Lea DeLaria	Edward Bullingham	Harvey Guillén
The Criminologist (Narrator)	Jonathan Adams (Note: Appeared as Dr Scott in The Rocky Horror Picture Show)	Graham Jarvis	Jonathan Adams	Dick Cavett	Mawaan Rizwan Nathan Caton	Rachel Dratch

=== Notable replacements ===
==== Original West End ====
- Frank-N-Furter: Philip Sayer, Ziggy Byfield, Peter Blake, Daniel Abineri
- Brad Majors: James Warwick, Hayward Morse, Steve Devereux
- Janet Weiss: Susie Blake, Tracey Ullman
- Magenta/Trixie: Angela Bruce, Leueen Willoughby, Leni Harper
- Riff-Raff: Robert Longden
- Rocky Horror: Miles Fothergill, Jeremy Gittins, Gary Martin
- Eddie/Dr.Scott: Gary Olsen
- Narrator: Terence Bayler, Tom Chatto, Nicholas Parsons

==== UK tour (1990–1991) ====
- Frank-N-Furter: Duncan James (2018–19)
- Brad Majors: Ore Oduba (2022)
- Janet Weiss: Joanne Clifton (2018)
- Narrator: Steve Punt (2015, 2016), Norman Pace (2016) Joe McFadden (2023)

==== 2000 Broadway revival ====
- Frank-N-Furter: Terrence Mann
- Brad Majors: Luke Perry
- Riff-Raff: Sebastian Bach
- Columbia: Liz Larsen, Ana Gasteyer
- Narrator: Penn & Teller, Jerry Springer, Sally Jessy Raphael, Cindy Adams, Dave Holmes, Gilbert Gottfried, Robin Leach, Kate Clinton

==== 2026 Broadway revival ====
- Janet: Lorna Courtney
- Brad: Kevin McHale
- Eddie/Dr. Scott: George Salazar
- Frank-N-Furter: Paul Soileau, Jake Shears
- Columbia: Valentina
- Magenta/Trixie: Sherie Rene Scott
- Narrator: Rosie O'Donnell, Margaret Cho

== Cast recordings ==
- 1973 London cast
- 1974 Roxy cast, starring Tim Curry
- 1974 Australian cast, starring Reg Livermore
- 1975 Brazilian cast, starring Alfonso Nadal
- 1975 Rocky Horror Picture Show film soundtrack
- 1976 Mexican cast, starring Gonzalo Vega
- 1977 Norwegian cast, starring Knut Husebø
- 1978 New Zealand cast, starring Gary Glitter
- 1980 German cast
- 1981 Australian cast, starring Daniel Abineri
- 1990 London cast ("The Whole Gory Story"), starring Tim McInnerny
- 1991 Icelandic cast
- 1992 Australian cast, starring Craig McLachlan
- 1994 German cast
- 1995 New Zealand cast
- 1995 Finnish cast, starring Mika Honkanen
- 1995 Icelandic cast
- 1995 German cast
- 1995 Studio cast, featuring Christopher Lee as The Criminologist and Brian May as Eddie
- 1996 Danish cast, starring Kim Leprévost
- 1996–97 European tour, starring Bob Simon
- 1997 German cast
- 1998 London cast
- 1998 South African cast
- 2001 Broadway cast, with Lea DeLaria as Eddie/Dr. Scott
- 2001 Korean cast
- 2001 Peruvian cast
- 2002 Philippine cast
- 2004 Tribute soundtrack, performed by The West End Orchestra & Singers
- 2005 Vancouver cast
- 2007 Panamanian cast
- 2009 Mexican cast
- 2010 Icelandic cast
- 2010 Glee tribute soundtrack
- 2011 Polish cast
- 2011 Japanese cast
- 2014 Australian cast, starring Jason Donovan
- 2014 Theatreland chorus
- 2016 Let's Do the Time Warp Again television film soundtrack
- 2018 Icelandic cast, starring Páll Óskar

== Awards and nominations ==
The original London production won the award for Best Musical of 1973 at the Standard Theatre Awards. All three Broadway productions have accrued both Tony and Drama Desk nominations.

=== Original London production ===
Year	Award	Category	Nominee	Result
1973	Evening Standard Award	Best Musical		Won

=== Original Broadway production ===
Year	Award	Category	Nominee	Result
1975	Tony Award	Best Lighting Design	Chip Monck	Nominated
1975	Drama Desk Award	Outstanding Actor in a Musical	Tim Curry	Nominated
1975	Drama Desk Award	Outstanding Featured Actress in a Musical	Boni Enten	Nominated
1975	Drama Desk Award	Unique Theatrical Experience		Nominated

=== 2001 Broadway revival ===
Year	Award	Category	Nominee	Result
2001	Tony Award	Best Revival of a Musical		Nominated
2001	Tony Award	Best Performance by a Leading Actor in a Musical	Tom Hewitt	Nominated
2001	Tony Award	Best Direction of a Musical	Christopher Ashley	Nominated
2001	Tony Award	Best Costume Design	David C. Woolard	Nominated
2001	Drama Desk Award	Outstanding Revival of a Musical		Nominated
2001	Drama Desk Award	Outstanding Actor in a Musical	Tom Hewitt	Nominated
2001	Drama Desk Award	Outstanding Director of a Musical	Christopher Ashley	Nominated
2001	Drama Desk Award	Outstanding Choreography	Jerry Mitchell	Nominated
2001	Drama Desk Award	Outstanding Set Design of a Musical	David Rockwell	Nominated
2001	Theatre World Award		Raúl Esparza	Won

=== 2026 Broadway revival ===
Year	Award	Category	Nominee	Result	Ref.
2026	Drama League Awards	Outstanding Revival of a Musical		Nominated	
2026	Drama League Awards	Outstanding Direction of a Musical	Sam Pinkleton	Nominated	
2026	Drama League Awards	Distinguished Performance	Stephanie Hsu	Nominated	
2026	Drama League Awards	Distinguished Performance	Luke Evans	Nominated	
2026	Outer Critics Circle Awards	Outstanding Lead Performer in a Broadway Musical	Luke Evans	Nominated	
2026	Outer Critics Circle Awards	Outstanding Featured Performer in a Broadway Musical	Andrew Durand	Nominated	
2026	Drama Desk Awards	Outstanding Revival of a Musical		Nominated	
2026	Drama Desk Awards	Outstanding Lead Performance in a Musical	Luke Evans	Nominated	
2026	Drama Desk Awards	Outstanding Featured Performance in a Musical	Stephanie Hsu	Nominated	
2026	Tony Awards	Best Revival of a Musical		Nominated	
2026	Tony Awards	Best Performance by a Leading Actress in a Musical	Stephanie Hsu	Nominated	
2026	Tony Awards	Best Performance by a Leading Actor in a Musical	Luke Evans	Nominated	
2026	Tony Awards	Best Performance by a Featured Actress in a Musical	Rachel Dratch	Nominated	
2026	Tony Awards	Best Scenic Design of a Musical	dots	Nominated	
2026	Tony Awards	Best Costume Design of a Musical	David Reynoso	Nominated	
2026	Tony Awards	Best Lighting Design of a Musical	Jane Cox	Nominated	
2026	Tony Awards	Best Sound Design of a Musical	Brian Ronan	Nominated	
2026	Tony Awards	Best Choreography	Ani Taj	Nominated	
2026	Dorian Awards	Outstanding Broadway Musical Revival		Nominated	
2026	Dorian Awards	Outstanding LGBTQ Broadway Production		Won	
2026	Dorian Awards	Outstanding Lead Performance in a Broadway Musical	Luke Evans	Nominated	
2026	Dorian Awards	Outstanding Lead Performance in a Broadway Musical	Stephanie Hsu	Nominated	
2026	Dorian Awards	Outstanding Featured Performance in a Broadway Musical	Rachel Dratch	Nominated	
2026	Dorian Awards	Outstanding Broadway Ensemble	Company	Nominated	
2026	Dorian Awards	Outstanding Design of a Broadway Production		Nominated	
