= Hank Beebe =

American composer (1926–2023)

- Born: July 16, 1926; Pitman, New Jersey, U.S.
- Died: February 5, 2023 (aged 96) Portland, Maine
- Genres: Musical theatre, film, television
- Occupation: Composer
- Instrument: Piano
- Years active: 1954–2023
- Website: https://www.hankbeebe.com/

Harold H. Beebe Jr. (July 16, 1926 – February 5, 2023) was an American composer, known for his choral compositions, Broadway musicals, and most notably for his work through the 1950s to the early 1980s composing industrial musicals for the employees and shareholders of major American business corporations. His work during this period was documented in the 2018 American documentary film Bathtubs Over Broadway.

== Early life ==
Beebe was born on July 16, 1926, in Pitman, New Jersey, to Harold Henry and Miriam Priscilla (née Davidson) Beebe. He attended Pitman High School and transferred after moving to Florida, and after graduating attended the University of North Carolina where he received a Master of Music in 1951. He then moved to Philadelphia and studied composition with Vincent Persichetti at the Philadelphia Conservatory of Music.

== Career ==
Beebe’s first job was music director at WCAU television in Philadelphia on ‘’The Children’s Hour’’. In 1967, he worked briefly on The Mike Douglas Show before turning to musical theatre.

While working on Broadway in New York City, Beebe auditioned for "The Chevy Show": a "corporate musical" presenting the new 1957 Chevrolet line of production. Although the show consisted of a musical book, score, cast and full orchestra, it was not meant to be seen by the public; only Detroit dealers and Chevy executives and their employees.

Beebe worked as a musical consultant, arranger and composer on hundreds of "Industrial Musicals" for General Motors of Detroit, the Radio Corporation of America in Indianapolis, Coca-Cola, Westinghouse and the McDonald's Corporation in Oak Brook, Illinois from the 1950s to the early 1980s. In 1969, Beebe wrote the re-election song for New York City Mayor John Lindsay.

In the early 1990s, a staff writer for The David Letterman Show, Steve Young, purchased an album entitled Go Fly a Kite (a 1966 GE Industrial Musical), for Letterman's "Dave’s Record Collection" segment. "It started as something to make fun of," Young said. "I thought, How pathetic, an insurance musical. But then I wondered why, three days later, I was still singing these songs."

Record collector Scott Murphy teamed up with Young to write the book "‘’Everything's Coming Up Profits: The Golden Age of Industrial Musicals’’” in 2013 which told the story of Beebe and other composers and actors who took part in creating these one-time corporate musicals. Their collaboration was turned into the award-winning documentary Bathtubs Over Broadway.

Beebe also wrote for both Off- and On- Broadway. His most popular work was the musical The Cowboy and The Tiger that ran for two years at the York Playhouse and the East 74th Street Theater in New York City and starred Jack Gilford and Paul O'Keefe. It later aired on ABC as a made-for-television musical starring the original cast in 1963. The audience reception and critical acclaim was so positive, that ABC reprogrammed the musical 10 days later. His next musical, Tuscaloosa’s Calling Me … But I’m Not Going! (sometimes simply called: Tuscaloosa), was also a success. It opened Off-Broadway on December 1, 1975 and ran for 452 performances. Beebe received the 1975–76 Outer Critics Circle Award for “Best Off-Broadway Musical”.

In 1977, Beebe was contracted to work on the revival of the musical Hellzapoppin with Jerry Lewis and Lynn Redgrave; but due to complications with Lewis, the show never made it to Broadway. While in New York, Beebe's choral setting of the Twenty-Fourth Psalm engaged him with publisher Don Hinshaw; which led to other choral publishing firms such as Beckenhorst Press, Carl Fischer and Fred Bock Music. He has written hundreds of choral works and anthems that have been performed by the Mormon Tabernacle Choir, YMCA Chorale and Orchestra of New York, and churches around the world. The hymn tune "Bickford" was composed by Beebe.

Beebe was organist and choir director for such churches as St. Matthew's and St. Timothy's in New York, St. Albans in Cape Elizabeth, Maine and St. Elizabeth's Mission in Portland, Maine. Moving to Portland, Maine, in 1980, the Beebe family founded The Embassy Players: a company that produced and performed musicals composed and written by Beebe. The company was passed on to its board of directors in 1990.

== Personal life and death ==
Beebe was married to Nancy Beebe. They had two children and lived in Portland, Maine.

Beebe died on February 5, 2023, at the age of 96.

== Bibliography ==
- Young, Steve (2013). Everything's Coming Up Profits: The Golden Age of Industrial Musicals. Blast Books. ISBN 978-0-9222334-4-1.
- Beebe, Hank (2017). I Chose to Compose (Against the Advice of Just About Everyone). ASIN B071DRMTDM.
