= Norman Paris =

American composer, arranger, bandleader and pianist

- Born: Norman Thaddeus Pavlak; October 21, 1925; Philadelphia, Pennsylvania, U.S.
- Died: July 10, 1977 (aged 51); New York, New York, U.S.
- Spouse(s): Elaine Ellis (m. ?; div. 1954); Dorothy Loudon (m. 1971)
- Children: 2
- Musical career
- Genres: Jazz; Easy listening
- Occupations: Musician; composer; arranger
- Instruments: Piano, accordion
- Years active: 1946–1974
- Label: Columbia

Norman Paris (born Norman Thaddeus Pavlak; October 21, 1925 – July 10, 1977) was an American pianist, arranger, composer, conductor, and bandleader. Hailed by Billboard's Bob Francis and Bob Rolontz as—respectively—"one of the best accompanists in the business" and a "sensational pian[ist whose] stylings, even in back of the singers, were a delight," Paris composed and/or arranged music for numerous television programs during the nineteen fifties and sixties, frequently appearing with his trio as well. In addition, he provided musical arrangements and/or orchestrations for both the big screen and Broadway stage.

== Early life and career ==
Born in Frankford, Philadelphia, Norman Pavlak was the middle child of three, born to Polish émigrés Joseph A. and Natalia—and/or Petronela—Theodora Pavlak. Having reportedly made his professional debut with the Philadelphia Orchestra at the age of six, Pavlak played accordion duets with his father at bar mitzvahs while still in his late pre-teens, and, over the next decade, was awarded successive scholarships to the Philadelphia Music Academy and Curtis Institute—where he studied, respectively, with Helen Hause and Ralph Berkowitz—and to Temple University. Evidently, he and/or his father also attended classes at E.U. Wurlitzer Music and Sound at some point, because in 1943, they performed together again, this time at a War Bond rally held in Philadelphia's Witherspoon Building, reported to be the work of "Wurlitzer students."

After serving for two years in the U.S. Navy in World War II, Pavlak moved to New York in 1946, where, by mid-June, he had adopted the stage name Paris, found work at Manhattan's Copacabana, and appeared on Paul Whiteman's Starway to the Stars, a radio program showcasing young talent. Among this episode's fellow rising stars was a young Judy Holliday, about four months into her star-making Broadway run as Billie Dawn in Born Yesterday. Two months later, another similarly themed series, Skyline Roof, featured host Gordon MacRae joined in song by the young pianist.

The following year, Paris formed his eponymous trio, with guitarist Frank Cerchia and bassist Justin Arndt. Beginning in October 1947, they provided the music—both backgrounds and the occasional featured instrumental—at Julius Monk's Le Ruban Bleu until its closing more than nine years later. They accompanied artists such as Maxine Sullivan, Connie Sawyer, Bibi Osterwald, Ethel Waters Larry Blake, Michael Brown, actress Shirl Conway, in her singing debut the husband-wife duo Alan and Phyllis Sues. Ellen Hanley and her husband Ronny Graham, and Paris's future wife, Dorothy Loudon.

Reviewing the trio's Ruban Bleu debut, Variety's Abel Green dubbed the unit "one of the brightest new combinations around." [...] Trios of this nature frequently are lost in the shuffle of being serviceable accompanists period. But not so Paris who, firstly, is a stylized piano virtuoso in his own right; and in combination with his other two strings, a zingy act that can play class cafes and vaudeville with equal facility."

In March 1957, roughly one month after Bleu's demise, the Paris trio began providing musical backgrounds for NBC's daytime series Home, hosted by Arlene Francis. When the show was cancelled five months later in favor of her own self-titled series, Paris was named musical director. Other shows on which he served as MD include I've Got a Secret, That Was the Week That Was , The Generation Gap, For Your Pleasure (with Kyle MacDonnell), and The Blue Angel.

Interviewed many years later, Gene Bertoncini recalled his time as a studio guitarist at NBC, performing Paris's charts for That Was the Week That Was.

Yes, it was live. I used my L-5. The conductor Norman Paris, who was a really great guy, had a trio that would do complicated guitar/piano things. He'd put this stuff out in front of me, and I wasn't that quick of a study, but he was so patient with me and would give me a chance to woodshed whatever he'd written for each show.

Paris also handled the music on a number of special broadcasts; this includes scoring JFK Report No. 1 and its like-named sequels—all airing during or immediately following the late president's administration—as well as several hosted by comedian Alan King, including Alan King and His Buddy (1969), Alan King Looks Back in Anger—A Review of 1972 (1973), The Many Faces of Comedy (1973) and Alan King's Energy Crisis (1974). He was music director on NBC's Johnny Carson Discovers Cypress Gardens—billed as Carson's debut as host of a non-recurring program—and scored the 1969, hour-long Kenya-centered documentary, Adventures at the Jade River, written and directed by David Seltzer and hosted by William Holden, (Note: This was actually presented as the debut episode of what, even at the outset, was projected as an infrequent and irregularly airing series, entitled William Holden: Unconquered Worlds as it turns out, even that modest prediction proved overly optimistic, as no additional episodes ever aired.) as well as a made-for-TV remake of Arsenic and Old Lace, airing that same year and starring Helen Hayes and Lillian Gish.

As for motion pictures, Paris arranged and conducted the scores of two notable firsts: David and Lisa—the dual directing/screenwriting debut of Frank and Eleanor Perry—and writer-director Ernest Pintoff's first live-action film, the 1961 short, The Shoes, starring Buddy Hackett. Paris once again teamed with Pintoff the following year on the animated short, The Old Man and the Flower.

Paris's last credits were as a composer on episodes of the series The Big Blue Marble.

== Personal life and death ==
After having two children together, Paris and his first wife separated in 1954. For the next 18 years—beginning in January 1955—he and comedienne Dorothy Loudon dated, finally tying the knot on December 18, 1971.

On July 10, 1977, Paris died at age 51 at Manhattan's Mount Sinai Hospital, where he had been admitted approximately one week before, reportedly as a result of "complications from a heart ailment and acute diabetes". He was survived by his wife, the two children from his prior marriage, his mother and two siblings.

The following year, composer-arranger Patrick Williams paid tribute to his late colleague with the final "special thanks" offered on his new MPS release, Come Out and Shine.

This album is dedicated to the memory of Norman Paris, who "shined" in my life.

== Discography ==
=== As leader ===
- Evening in Paris – The Norman Paris Trio (Columbia, 1951)
- The Cocktail Hour – The Norman Paris Trio (Columbia, 1956)
- Music from Rodgers and Hammerstein's 'The Sound Of Music' – The Norman Paris Quartet (Harmony, 1960)

=== As sideman, arranger or composer ===
With Ben Bagley

- Jerome Kern Revisited (Columbia, 1965)
- Rodgers and Hart Revisited (Recording Industries Corp., 1966)
- George Gershwin Revisited (MGM, 1966)
- Irving Berlin Revisited (MGM, 1967)
- Noel Coward Revisited (MGM, 1969)
- Harold Arlen Revisited (Crewe, 1970)
- Arthur Schwartz Revisited (Crewe, 1970)
- Rodgers and Hart Revisited, Vol. 2 (Crewe, 1970)
- DeSylva, Brown, and Henderson Revisited (Painted Smiles, 1971)
- Ira Gershwin Revisited (Painted Smiles, 1971)
- Vincent Youmans Revisited (Painted Smiles, 1971)
- Carl Freiwald Presents Ben Bagley's Oscar Hammerstein Revisited (Painted Smiles, 1975)

With The Honey Dreamers

- The Honey Dreamers with Norman Paris (A & R, 1958)
- It's Dark on Observatory Hill (Dot, 1959)

With Michael Brown

- Wonderful World of Chemistry – Norman Paris, His Orchestra, Quintet, and the David Carter Singers (DuPont, 1964)
- Mr. Woolworth Had a Notion (Donahue Sales Corporation, 1965)
- Spirit of '66 (J. C. Penney, 1966)

With Portia Nelson

- Love Songs for a Late Evening (Columbia, 1953)
- Autumn Leaves (Dolphin, 1956); reissued as Remind Me (Stanyan, 1973)

With Rosemary Rice

- Hans Christian Andersen in Song and Story (Harmony, 1960)
- Hey Kids, Let's Sing! (Harmony, 196)
- Holiday Fun for Children : How Each Holiday Began (Harmony, 196-)
- The Wonderful World of Children's Songs (RCA Camden, 1967)

With Earl Wrightson

- An Enchanted Evening on Broadway with Earl Wrightson (Columbia, 1960)
- Ballads of a Soldier of Fortune (Columbia, 1962)

With others

- Fran Allison (with Quintet) – Music to Cook By—Cookbook and Album (Stylist, 1970)
- Lew Anderson (aka Clarabell the Clown) – Clarabelle Clowns with Jazz – The Norman Paris Trio (Golden Crest, 1957)
- Marshall Barer - The Times Has Come! The Songs Of Marshall Barer (Painted Smiles, 196-)
- Dorothy Loudon – Dorothy Loudon at the Blue Angel (Coral, 1959)
- Tony Morell – Here's to Love (MGM, 1962)
- Jerry Orbach – Off Broadway (MGM, 1962)
- Lily Pons – "Mimosas" / "Le loup, la biche et le chevalier" (Columbia, 1954)
- Ruth Price – The Party's Over (Kapp, 1957)
- Glenn Riggs and Paul Wing – Peter Rabbit, Goldilocks & Other Great Tales For Boys And Girls (RCA Victor, 195)
- Sylvia Syms – "Porgy" / "Mad About You" (De Luxe, 1948)

== See also ==
- List of music arrangers
