= Dorothy Loudon =

American actress, singer, performer (1925–2003)

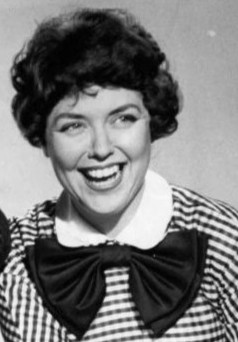
- Loudon in 1959
- Born: September 17, 1925; Boston, Massachusetts, U.S.
- Died: November 15, 2003 (aged 78); Manhattan, New York City, U.S.
- Occupations: Actress, singer
- Spouse: Norman Paris (1971–1977; his death)
- Awards: 1977 Tony Award for Best Performance by a Leading Actress in a Musical; Annie

Dorothy Loudon (September 17, 1925 – November 15, 2003) was an American actress and singer. She won the Tony Award for Best Lead Actress in a Musical in 1977 for her performance as Miss Hannigan in Annie. Loudon was also nominated for Tony Awards for her lead performances in the musicals The Fig Leaves Are Falling and Ballroom, as well as a Golden Globe award for her appearances on The Garry Moore Show.

== Early life and career ==
Loudon was born in Boston, Massachusetts, in 1925 (she later shaved eight years off her age), to James Edwin Loudon and Dorothy Helen Loudon (née Shaw). She was raised in Claremont, New Hampshire, and Indianapolis, Indiana. She attended Syracuse University on a drama scholarship but did not graduate, and moved to New York City to study at the American Academy of Dramatic Arts. She began singing in night clubs, one such being New York's Blue Angel, mingling song with ad-libbed comedy patter, and was featured on television on The Perry Como Show and The Ed Sullivan Show.

Loudon made her stage debut in 1962 in The World of Jules Feiffer, a play with incidental music by Stephen Sondheim, under the direction of Mike Nichols. That same year she made her Broadway debut in Nowhere to Go but Up, which ran only two weeks but earned her good reviews and the Theatre World Award. In 1969, The Fig Leaves Are Falling ran for only four performances, although it won her the Drama Desk Award for Outstanding Performance and a nomination for the Tony Award for Best Lead Actress in a Musical. She followed this with a revival of Three Men on a Horse directed by George Abbott; Lolita, My Love, which closed out-of-town during its pre-Broadway tryout; and a revival of the Clare Boothe Luce comedy The Women.

== Broadway ==
Loudon's performance as the evil orphanage administrator Miss Hannigan in Annie won her the Tony Award and the Drama Desk Award for Outstanding Featured Actress in a Musical in 1977. In the show she introduced the seminal showtunes "Little Girls" and "Easy Street." Of her portrayal, Clive Barnes wrote, "As the wicked Miss Hannigan, Dorothy Loudon, eyes bulging with envy, face sagging with hatred, is deliciously and deliriously horrid. She never puts a sneer, a leer, or even a scream in the wrong place, and her singing has just the right brassy bounce to it." Loudon later revisited the character of Miss Hannigan in the ill-fated 1990 sequel, Annie 2: Miss Hannigan's Revenge, which closed quickly after a dismal pre-Broadway engagement in Washington D.C.

In 1979, Michael Bennett cast Loudon as Bea Asher, a widow who becomes romantically involved with a mail carrier she meets at the local dance hall, in Ballroom. She was nominated for the Tony Award for Best Leading Actress in a Musical and the Drama Desk Award for Outstanding Actress in a Musical. She performed the number "Fifty Percent" from the musical during that year's Tony Awards ceremony. During her rendition of George Gershwin's "Vodka" at the 1983 Tony Awards ceremony while resplendent in a blue sequined gown, she ad-libbed "I'm too good for this room. I'm too good for this song...but I'm not too good for this dress!" At the 38th Annual Tony Awards ceremony in 1984, Loudon performed "Broadway Baby" from Follies. In The New York Times, John O'Connor said of her performance, "Miss Loudon has developed the art of mugging into something of a hyperactive disease."

In 1980, Loudon succeeded Angela Lansbury as Mrs. Lovett in Stephen Sondheim's Sweeney Todd. In reviewing her performance for The Christian Science Monitor, David Sterritt said, "Her body sways like a reed in the emotional storms of her own scatter-brained creation, and her off-hand manner becomes still more off-handed when the most explosive matters are at stake ... Loudon gives a comic characterization in the most classical tradition." The following year she co-starred with Katharine Hepburn and Julia Barr in the play The West Side Waltz. In 1982 she won the Sarah Siddons Award for her work in Chicago theatre. She appeared in the 1983 Jerry Herman revue Jerry's Girls and later the same year she played the role of the miserable middle-aged actress Dotty Otley on Broadway in Michael Frayn's farce Noises Off.

She was cast as Carlotta Vance in the Lincoln Center Theater production of Dinner at Eight but was replaced by Marian Seldes in November 2002 when Loudon left the play because of illness.

== Television and film ==
Loudon was chosen as the replacement for Carol Burnett when Burnett left The Garry Moore Show in 1962. Although that collaboration was not altogether successful, the excellent reviews she received the same year for her Broadway debut in Nowhere to Go but Up proved prophetic. Coincidentally, the two roles Loudon later played so successfully on Broadway stage —Miss Hannigan and Dotty Otley — were both played by Burnett onscreen. She also was a frequent guest star on many New York based comedy and game shows. In 1979, Loudon starred in the television series Dorothy, in which she portrayed a former showgirl teaching music and drama at a boarding school for girls. It lasted only one season. She appeared in only two films, playing a photography agent in Garbo Talks (1984) and as Southern eccentric Serena Dawes in Midnight in the Garden of Good and Evil (1997).

== Personal life ==
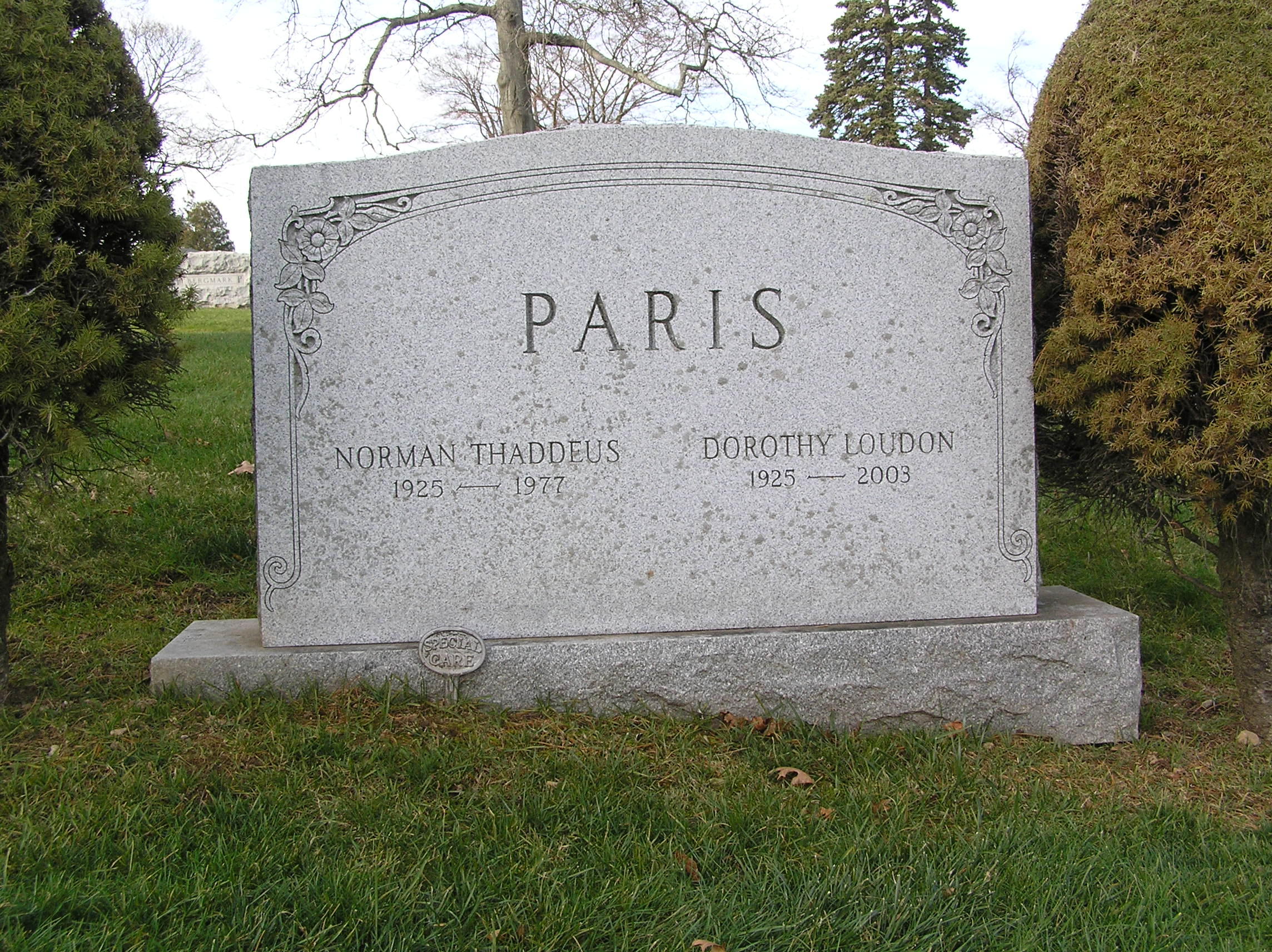
The headstone of Dorothy Loudon

Loudon was married to composer Norman Paris from 1971 to his death. She died in Manhattan, age 78, from cancer on November 15, 2003. Loudon was interred in Kensico Cemetery in Westchester County, New York. She left no immediate survivors except for two step-children from Paris's first marriage.

== Discography ==
- Dorothy Loudon at the Blue Angel
- Saloon
- Broadway Baby

== Theatre credits ==
- New Faces of 1959 (1959) (closed before opening)
- The World of Jules Feiffer (1962)
- Nowhere to Go but Up (1962)
- Anything Goes (1962) (replacement for Eileen Rodgers)
- The Unsinkable Molly Brown (1963)
- The Apple Tree (1967)
- Noël Coward's Sweet Potato (1968)
- The Fig Leaves Are Falling (1969)
- Three Men on a Horse (1969)
- Lolita, My Love (1971) (closed on the road)
- The Women (1973)
- Annie (1977)
- Ballroom (1980)
- Sweeney Todd (1980) (replacement for Angela Lansbury)
- The West Side Waltz (1981)
- Noises Off (1983)
- Jerry's Girls (1985)
- Annie 2: Miss Hannigan's Revenge (1990) (closed on the road in Washington, DC)
- Comedy Tonight (1994)
- Show Boat (1996)
- Sweet Adeline (1997)
- Over and Over (1999) (Signature Theatre, Arlington, Virginia)
- Dinner at Eight (2002)

== Filmography credits ==
=== Film ===
- Garbo Talks (1984) - Sonya Apollinar
- Midnight in the Garden of Good and Evil (1997) - Serena Dawes (final film role)

=== Television ===
- It's a Business (1952) - Secretary
- The Garry Moore Show (1962–1964) - Herself
- All My Children (1970) - Veronica Mullens (1993)
- Dorothy (1979) - Dorothy Banks
- Magnum, P.I. (1986)
- Murder, She Wrote (1986)
- Performance at the White House: Showstoppers (1988) - Herself
- A Salute to Broadway: Showstoppers (1988, TV Movie) - Herself
- Sondheim: A Celebration at Carnegie Hall (1993) - Herself
- My Favorite Broadway: The Leading Ladies (1999) - Herself
