= Michael Reno =

American composer, arranger, orchestrator and theatrical producer

Michael Reno (May 19, 1950, in Brush, Colorado, U.S.-November 22, 2025, in Phoenix, Arizona) is an American composer, arranger, orchestrator, and theatrical producer who is a frequent collaborator of theatrical entrepreneur Peter Schneider. Reno is a member of the Reno family for whom the city of Reno, Nevada, is named, and a descendant of Marcus Reno, who was noted for his role in the Battle of Little Bighorn.married to Roslyn Roseman a.k.a. Roz McHenry 1971 and two children Collin Reno and Aaron Reno and three granddaughters .Michael passed away November 22, 2025 at the age of 75 years old.

Reno is the composer and lyricist of the My Songs Personalized Children's Music series, and the original producer of the musical theatre stage version of Sister Act (musical). He is the musical supervisor, arranger, and orchestrator of the most recent reconceived version of the Rodgers and Hart classic musical "Pal Joey" as well as the composer and lyricist of Between Judy and the Moon: Stonewall, a work for male chorus which commemorates the riots at New York's Stonewall Inn in June 1969.

As a director and musical director, Reno's work has been seen around the world, in venues ranging from Montreal's Place des Artes, Shanghai's Center Theater, and the Vienna Concert House, to New York's Madison Square Garden, L.A.'s Universal Amphitheater, the White House, and many major hotels in Las Vegas including Caesar's Palace, Mandalay Bay, and The Bellagio.

Reno began his professional career at the Barn Theatre in Augusta, Michigan, where in 1976 he premiered his musical Revelation. His other stage musicals include: Quarks - The First Minute, Three Down, Four Across: Love, Gypsies, and Tidal Wave. He was the musical director and arranger for the original San Francisco production of The Rocky Horror Show, and wrote the song that became an unofficial anthem for the city of San Francisco in the 1970s and 1980s: San Francisco Bye-Bye. He is also known for his work on the movies Twice Upon a Christmas and North 'Cross Jordan, as well as his contributions to the Miss America pageant, and many television projects for NBC. He also worked as conductor and arranger for band leader Lawrence Welk at the Welk theater in Escondido, California.

Reno was active for years in the Industrial musical industry, working for clients such as the Shaklee Corporation, Kawasaki Motorcycles, Supercuts, the Marriott Corporation, the Charles Schwab Corporation and many others. He co-founded and was Vice President of Command Performance Productions, and founded Music for Conventions.
