= A Broadway Musical =

- Live original cast recording
- Music: Charles Strouse
- Lyrics: Lee Adams
- Book: William F. Brown
- Productions: 1978 Broadway

A Broadway Musical is a musical with a book by William F. Brown, lyrics by Lee Adams, and music by Charles Strouse. The Broadway production closed after 14 previews and only one performance on December 21, 1978.

The plot about a sleazy white theatre producer's attempt to adapt an African-American writer's serious play as a commercial stage musical was inspired by Adams and Strouse's real-life experiences with their 1964 Broadway production of Golden Boy. The star of the musical-within-the-musical (Sneakers, about a basketball star) closely resembles Golden Boy star Sammy Davis Jr. When the star opts to leave the show, the playwright – who from the start had resisted turning his work into a musical – steps in and takes on the lead role in order to save the production.

== Background and production ==
The creators hoped that the backstage story about the making of a musical would cash in on the success of A Chorus Line as well as the popularity of the black-themed musical, including Brown's own The Wiz, which was still running at the time. But Brown's much-criticized book is a clichéd spoof of show business lawyers, idealistic young playwrights, glitzy Las Vegas performers, blue-haired matinée ladies, and the black-themed musical itself. The Wiz proved to be Brown's only success.

Following a dismal October–November tryout with Helen Gallagher and Julius LaRosa at the theatre in the Riverside Church in Morningside Heights, the producers fired most of the cast and creative personnel, including director/choreographer George Faison. Gower Champion was called in to rescue the Broadway-bound production with only a month to go, but he feared that the show's defects were too serious to remedy and insisted on receiving a "Production supervised by" credit only.

After 14 previews, the Broadway production opened and closed the same night at the Lunt-Fontanne Theatre on December 21, 1978. The cast included Patti Karr (replacing Gallagher), Alan Weeks, Larry Marshall, Warren Berlinger (replacing LaRosa), Loretta Devine, Jackée Harry and Tiger Haynes. A cast album was recorded during a live performance in December 1978.

In 2017, Feinstein's/54 Below in New York gave a concert presentation of A Broadway Musical, directed and produced by Robert W. Schneider. The cast included Clifton Davis, Jason Graae and Kyle Scatliffe.

== Song list ==
Act I

- "Broadway, Broadway" – New Kids in Town, Policeman and James Lincoln
- "A Broadway Musical" – Eddie Bell, James Lincoln, Lonnie Paul, Melinda Bernard, Stan Howard, Maggie Simpson and Ensemble
- "Smoke and Fire" – Stan Howard, James Lincoln, Kumi-Kumi and Ensemble
- "Lawyers" – Eddie Bell, Stephanie Bell and Richie's Lawyers
- "Yenta Power" – Shirley Wolfe and Associates
- "Let Me Sing My Song" – Richie Taylor
- "A Broadway Musical (Reprise)" – Eddie Bell, Stephanie Bell, James Lincoln, Shirley Wolfe, Maggie Simpson, Lonnie Paul, Stan Howard and Ensemble

Act II

- "The 1934 Hot Chocolate Jazz Babies Revue" – Sylvester Lee, James Lincoln and Ensemble
- "Let Me Sing My Song (Reprise)" – Richie Taylor and Friends
- "It's Time for a Cheer-Up Song" – Stan Howard, Maggie Simpson, Lonnie Paul and James Lincoln
- "You Gotta Have Dancing" – Maggie Simpson, James Lincoln and Ensemble
- "What You Go Through" – Stephanie Bell and Eddie Bell
- "Don't Tell Me" – Eddie Bell
- "Together" – James Lincoln, Eddie Bell and Staff

== Characters and original Broadway cast ==
- Richie Taylor's Lawyer – Sydney Anderson
- Rehearsal Pianist – Gwen Arment
- Policeman, Nathaniel – Nate Barnett
- Eddie Bell – Warren Berlinger
- Stephanie Bell – Gwyda DonHowe
- Shirley Wolfe – Anne Francine
- Richie Taylor's Lawyer – Michael Gallagher
- Melinda Bernard – Jackée Harry
- Sylvester Lee – Tiger Haynes
- Louie – Reggie Jackson
- Maggie Simpson – Patti Karr
- Kumi-Kumi – Christina Kumi Kimball
- James Lincoln – Irving Allen Lee
- Richie Taylor – Larry Marshall
- Junior – Robert Melvin
- Richie's Secretary – Jo Ann Ogawa
- Jake – Martin Rabbett
- Lonnie Paul – Larry Riley
- Big Jake – Albert Stephenson
- Stan Howard – Alan Weeks
- Smoke & Fire Back-Up Singer – Loretta Devine

== Critical response ==
Strouse wrote (in his memoir) that this was a "show he was proud of" because he and Adams had wanted to write a musical about their experiences with Sammy Davis Jr., about white people writing for a "big, black musical star". They envisioned it as "funny, ironic ... and filled with life's imbalances."

Mel Gussow, in his review for The New York Times, wrote that the idea was to write a spoof of Broadway intrigue and duplicity: "cynicism is rampant ... wisecracks about blacks on Broadway, Jewish theater party ladies ... and lawyers with steel clauses. ... The cast performs with eagerness, even as the show sinks."

Julius Novick of The Village Voice called it "the best Broadway musical since Platinum", a disaster that had opened the month before. Critic and theatre historian Ken Mandelbaum has described the show as "a genuine turkey... hopeless... [a] well-meaning but fatally underpowered evening. The Charles Strouse-Lee Adams score had its moments." Mandelbaum noted that "the characters were all clichés. ... A shallow treatment of a theme with potential ... was capped with an absurd ending".
