= Chelsea Classic Cinema =

Cinema in west London, England

Coordinates: 51.48905°N 0.16513°W

The Chelsea Classic Cinema was a cinema originally opened in 1913 as the Chelsea Picture Playhouse, in the King's Road, Chelsea.

It was designed by Felix Joubert, the cabinet maker and owner of The Pheasantry next door at number 152. It was built on land previously occupied by Box Farm (built in 1686 and demolished in 1899). On the western corner of Markham Street, it was initially opened by the London & Provincial Electric Theatre Company in 1913 with seating for 394 on a single floor. In the 1920s it was known as the Electric Theatre.

By 1937 it had been taken over by Classic Cinemas Ltd, who specialised in repertory screenings of classic Hollywood films, and was renamed the Classic Cinema, when the facade was reduced in height and given a 'modern' look which it kept until it closed on 4 August 1973.

It was the venue for The Rocky Horror Show four weeks after it had opened in London (at the Royal Court Theatre Upstairs), playing for three months. After the run ended, the building was demolished, replaced by a branch of Boots the Chemist in 1973.
