= The Barn Theatre =

Theatre in Augusta, Michigan

Coordinates: 42.32535°N 85.37275°W

The Barn Theatre in Augusta, Michigan, Kalamazoo County, United States is one of the oldest summer stock theatres in the United States and the oldest one in Michigan. It also houses The Barn Theatre School.

The barn theatre is just off the State Highway 96 by Augusta.

The theatre originated in 1946 when Jack Ragotzy, Betty Ebert and others formed the Village Players troupe. After playing several seasons in a community hall in a former Methodist church (in Richland), in 1949 Jack and Betty moved a dairy barn, which was converted into a theatre and was purchased by them in 1954. It was incorporated as "The Barn Theatre" in 1949. In 1951 it became an Equity theatre.

Its first show was the Finian's Rainbow musical.

== Notable performers ==
A number of notable performers made appearances at The Barn, including:

- Dana Delany
- Marin Mazzie was an apprentice in The Barn
- Michael Reno began his professional career at The Barn; he premiered his musical Revelation there in 1976
- Tom Wopat
- Wayne Lamb was a performer, choreographer and a producer at The Barn since 1955 for over 23 years.

The Barn Theatre School lists the following persons, in addition to the above ones, in their "Wall of Fame": John Newton, Adrienne Barbeau, Becky Ann Baker, Lauren Graham, Jonathan Larson, Robert Newman, and Jennifer Garner.
