= The Blue Angel (TV series) =

The Blue Angel is an American television variety series that was broadcast on CBS beginning on July 6, 1954. After a two-month run in the summer, it returned for a month in the fall, with its last broadcast on October 12, 1954.

== Overview ==
The Blue Angel used a set that was a replica of The Blue Angel night club in New York. Host Orson Bean contributed comedy to the program in addition to introducing guests and talking with them. The Norman Paris Trio provided music, and Polly Bergen sang. Guests on the program included:

- Pearl Bailey
- Carleton Carpenter
- Robert Clary
- Martha Davis and Spouse
- Billy DeWolfe
- Elaine Dunn
- Jane Dulo
- Hildegarde (her TV debut)
- Jane Morgan
- Patrice Munsel
- Jonathan Winters
- Martha Wright

== Production ==
CBS-TV and Herbert Jacoby, who owned The Blue Angel night club, packaged the program. It originated from WCBS-TV. The Blue Angel initially was broadcast on Tuesdays from 10:30 to 11 p.m. Eastern Time as the summer replacement for See It Now. When it returned in the fall, it was on Tuesdays from 8:30 to 9 p.m. E. T. Richard Lewine was the executive producer; Burt Shevelove produced and directed the show. Don Appell succeeded Shevelove in both roles.

== Critical response ==
A review of the premiere episode in the trade publication Billboard said that the show "had big-time written all over it" although the performers were not best-known stars. It complimented the various performers' acts and said that the program "should attract sponsors".

Elizabeth McCarthy wrote in The (Moline, Illinois) Dispatch that she "rather enjoyed the experience" of watching the show for the first time. She complimented the performances of guest stars Munsel and DeWolfe.

A review in TV Guide said The Blue Angel "represents one more almost desperate attempt on the part of TV to present a series of acts as something it actually isn’t" — in this case, presentation of performers at a night club.

A review in the trade publication Broadcasting said that the premiere episode started the series off well, commenting that each of the five acts "had that rare quality of leaving the viewer just a little hungry for more".

The trade publication Variety acknowledged the difficulty of representing the atmosphere of a night club in at TV program but described the program as "a mildly pleasant, unpretentious variety stanza".
