= Patti Karr =

American actress (1932–2020)

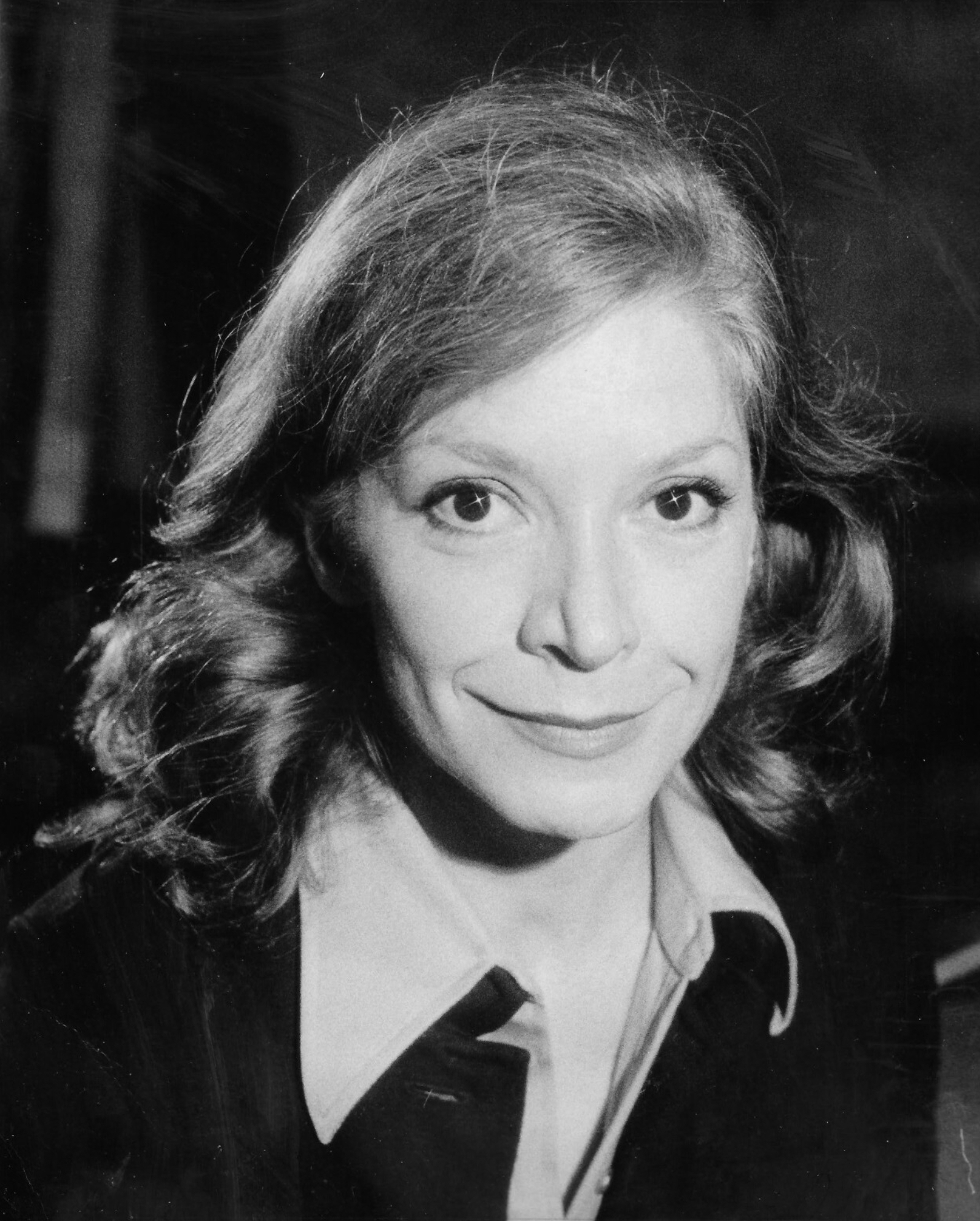
- Karr in 1978
- Born: Patsy Lou Karkalits; July 10, 1932; Saint Paul, Minnesota, U.S.
- Died: July 11, 2020 (aged 88); New York City, U.S.
- Occupation: Actress
- Years active: 1950s to 2000s

Patti Karr (July 10, 1932 – July 11, 2020), born Patsy Lou Karkalits, was an American actress, dancer, and singer in Broadway musicals, and in film and television.

== Early life ==
Patsy Lou Karkalits was born in Saint Paul, Minnesota, the daughter of Charles F. Karkalits and Estelle Klebold Karkalits. Her father was a businessman; her mother died when Patsy was a baby. She was raised in Fort Worth, Texas, where she graduated from Paschal High School and attended Texas Christian University. She began her dancing career in Texas, appearing in the corps de ballet of the Fort Worth Civic Opera. She also danced with the Pittsburgh Light Opera, and the Summertime Opera Company in Houston.

== Career ==
Karr first appeared on Broadway in 1953 as a dancer in a musical, Maggie. She went on to appear in over twenty Broadway productions, mostly musicals, including Carnival in Flanders (1953), Pipe Dream (1955-1956), Bells Are Ringing (1956-1959), The Body Beautiful (1958), Redhead (1959-1960), Once Upon a Mattress (1959-1960), Bye Bye Birdie (1960-1961), Do Re Mi (1960-1962), Look to the Lilies (1970), A Funny Thing Happened on the Way to the Forum (1972), Different Times (1972), Seesaw (1973), Irene (1973-1974), Pippin (1974-1976), A Broadway Musical (1978), and the 1993 revival of My Fair Lady. She was often the understudy of stars, including Chita Rivera, Carol Burnett, Michele Lee, Nancy Walker, and Gwen Verdon. She also appeared in off-Broadway plays and musicals, and national touring companies of several shows. In 1965, she played Anita in a production of West Side Story, when it toured Japan for nine weeks.

Karr's film credits included small roles in Mighty Aphrodite (1995), Our Italian Husband (2006), and The Savages (2007). On television, Karr appeared in the soap operas Ryan's Hope, All My Children, Guiding Light, and The Edge of Night, and had guest roles on dozens of other American series. She played three different roles in the Law & Order franchise. Her final television credit was as a diner patron in the last scene of "Made in America", the final episode of The Sopranos, in 2007.

== Personal life ==
Karr lived on West End Avenue in New York City. She was injured in a "bizarre accident" in 2017, when strong winds picked up a discarded Christmas tree from the curb, and it hit her in the face as she was walking her dog near her home. She died in 2020, the day after her 88th birthday.
