= Bathtubs Over Broadway =

2018 American documentary film directed by Dava Whisenant

- Theatrical release poster
- Directed by: Dava Whisenant
- Written by: Ozzy Inguanzo, Dava Whisenant
- Produced by: Dava Whisenant; Susan Littenberg; Amanda Spain
- Starring: Steve Young; David Letterman; Martin Short; Chita Rivera; Susan Stroman; Florence Henderson; Sheldon Harnick; Jello Biafra; Don Bolles
- Cinematography: Nick Higgins; Natalie Kingston
- Edited by: Dava Whisenant
- Music by: Anthony DiLorenzo
- Production companies: Cactus Flower Films; Blumhouse Television; Impact Partners
- Distributed by: Focus World
- Release dates: April 21, 2018 (Tribeca Film Festival); November 30, 2018
- Running time: 87 minutes
- Country: United States
- Language: English

Bathtubs Over Broadway is a 2018 American documentary film directed by Dava Whisenant. Comedy writer Steve Young’s assignment to scour bargain-bin vinyl for a late-night segment becomes an unexpected, decades-spanning obsession when he stumbles upon the strange and hilarious world of industrial musicals. The film premiered at the 2018 Tribeca Film Festival and was released on November 30, 2018 by Focus World.

== Synopsis ==
Steve Young is a comedy writer working for the Late Show with David Letterman. In 1993, his assignment to scour comedy vinyl records for a late-night segment leads him to an industrial musical produced by General Electric. Over the next two decades, Steve collects rare and unreleased recordings of industrial musicals, traveling across the country to meet and trade with other record collectors. Steve also tracks down the surviving composers and stars of many musical productions in order to map out the timespan of what he considers to be the strangest entertainment industry in America, from its rise in the 1950s to its eventual decline by the late-1980s.

== Credits ==
- David Letterman
- Martin Short
- Chita Rivera
- Susan Stroman
- Florence Henderson
- Sheldon Harnick
- Jello Biafra
- Steve Young
- Don Bolles
- Melody Rogers
- Willi Burke
- Peter Shawn
- Sandi Freeman
- Patt Stanton Gjonola
- Hank Beebe
- Sid Siegel

== Reception ==
Bathtubs Over Broadway has received acclaim from critics and audiences on the festival circuit, earning multiple awards. The film was included in Robert DeNiro's top 6 picks for the 2018 Tribeca Film Festival.

=== Festival Premiere ===
Bathtubs Over Broadway premiered on April 21, 2018 at the BMCC Tribeca Performing Arts Center as part of the 2018 Tribeca Film Festival. The film's director, Dava Whisenant, won Tribeca's Albert Maysles Award for Best New Documentary Director.

Tribeca Jury: "The winner of the Best New Documentary Director goes to a film that we chose for many reasons. The story, the specific subject, the journey into a world we never knew existed. This film also has an element every great film, doc, and story needs...heart."

Described as "the most feel-good film event of the 2018 Tribeca Film Festival," the premiere featured post-screening live performances, including a duet about motion-activated faucets that reunited the stars of American Standard's cult favorite industrial show The Bathrooms Are Coming!

=== Accolades ===
Film Festival / Organization	Award	Recipient(s)	Result
Tribeca Film Festival	Albert Maysles Award for Best New Documentary Director	Dava Whisenant	Won
Vancouver International Film Festival	Most Popular International Documentary	Bathtubs Over Broadway	Won
Nantucket Film Festival	Audience Award for Best Documentary Feature	Bathtubs Over Broadway	Won
Hamptons Film Festival Summer Doc Series	Audience Award for Best Documentary Feature	Bathtubs Over Broadway	Won
Naples International Film Festival	Jury Award: Best Documentary Feature	Bathtubs Over Broadway	Won
Sidewalk Film Festival	Audience Award for Best Documentary Feature	Bathtubs Over Broadway	Won
HotDocs	Top 10 Audience Favourite (#6)	Bathtubs Over Broadway	Won
Heartland Film Festival	Humor and Humanity Award	Bathtubs Over Broadway	Won
Traverse City Film Festival	Special Award for Exuberance in Documentary Filmmaking	Bathtubs Over Broadway	Won
Nashville Film Festival	Special Jury Prize for Creative Obsession	Bathtubs Over Broadway	Won
Alamo Drafthouse Lost Weekend X	Best Documentary	Bathtubs Over Broadway	Won
Alamo Drafthouse Lost Weekend X	Audience Favorite	Bathtubs Over Broadway	Won
Teaneck International Film Festival	Audience Award: Best Documentary	Bathtubs Over Broadway	Won
Cinema Eye Honors	Audience Choice Prize	Bathtubs Over Broadway	Nominated
Cinema Eye Honors	Outstanding Achievement in Graphic Design or Animation	Syd Garon, Anton Goddard, Chris Kirk	Nominated
IDA Documentary Awards	Best Music Documentary	Bathtubs Over Broadway	Nominated
IDA Documentary Awards	Best Score	Anthony Di Lorenzo	Nominated
AARP Movies for Grownups Awards	Best Documentary	Bathtubs Over Broadway	Nominated
Philadelphia Film Festival	Student Choice Award	Bathtubs Over Broadway	Nominated
Palm Springs International Film Festival	John Schlesinger Award	Bathtubs Over Broadway	Honorable Mention
Fargo Film Festival	Best Documentary Feature	Bathtubs Over Broadway	Won
Writers Guild of America Awards	Best Documentary Screenplay	Ozzy Inguanzo & Dava Whisenant	Won
Rotterdam International Film Festival	Audience Award	Bathtubs Over Broadway	2nd Place
Sedona Film Festival	Best of Fest Award	Bathtubs Over Broadway	Won
Chita Rivera Awards	Outstanding Documentary	Bathtubs Over Broadway	Nominated
ACE Eddie Awards	Best Edited Documentary (Non-Theatrical)	Bathtubs Over Broadway	Nominated
Film Threat's AWARD THIS!	Best Pop Culture Documentary	Bathtubs Over Broadway	Won

== Music ==
=== Soundtrack ===
The digital version of the soundtrack for Bathtubs Over Broadway was released by Back Lot Music on August 16, 2019. It was produced by Ozzy Inguanzo and Dava Whisenant, and features a collection of "rare, original cast recordings from the golden age of industrial musicals, as depicted throughout the film. Many of these vintage tracks have never been made commercially available and have been restored from their original vinyl recordings." Among the now-famous Broadway talent included on the album are Fiddler on the Roof songwriters and Tony Award winners Sheldon Harnick and Jerry Bock as well as Tony Award-winning actor Hal Linden. The soundtrack also includes an original score by Anthony DiLorenzo as well as original songs with lyrics by Steve Young, the main subject of the film. A vinyl configuration of the soundtrack is planned for a Fall 2019 release.
