= Barn theatre =

Type of theatre venue

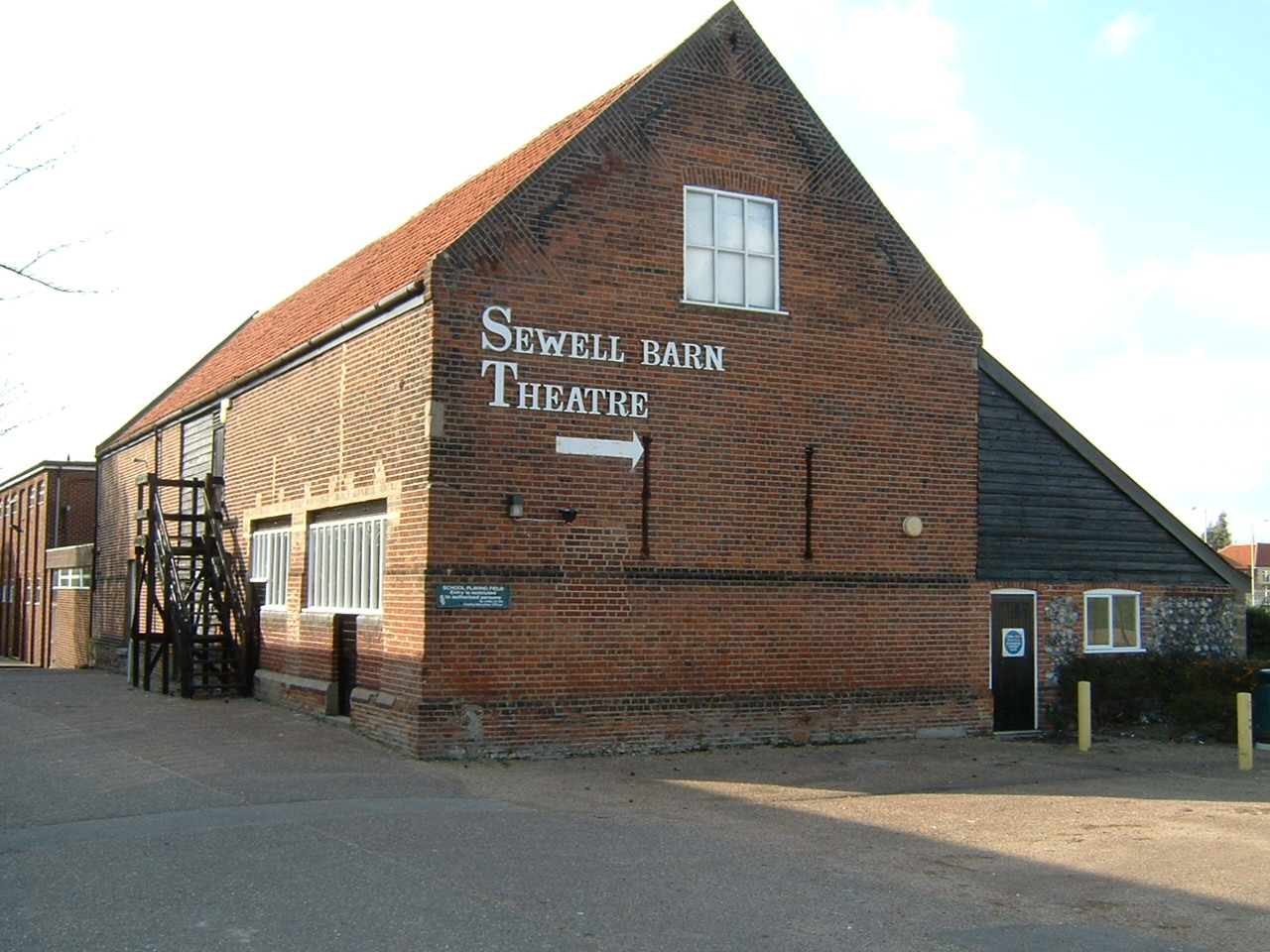
Sewell Barn Theatre, Norwich, England

A barn theatre is a barn refitted to stage plays. There is a long tradition in Europe dating back to at least the 19th century, and barn theatres are still common in England and the United States. They were common in the United States during the 1930s as summer stock theater.

In June 1947 The Billboard wrote that about 200 barn theatres were recorded in the United States for that summer season.

As of the 21st century two barn theaters in Michigan claim to be two of the oldest in the nation: Red Barn in Saugatuck and The Barn Theatre in Augusta.

While commonly summer barn theatres staged popular plays, some of them presented works of new dramatists and new Broadway try-outs.

William Birk, author of a book about the historical Rabbit Run Theatre in Madison, Ohio, wrote that one of the reasons to move to barn theatres in the summers of the 1940s was the lack of air conditioning in big city theatres, including on Broadway.

== See also ==
- Barn theatres in Lithuania
- Barn dance
