= The Wonderful World of Chemistry =

1964 musical revue

- Live and filmed actors "interact" during the flower-passing scene during the song “Antron, Nylon, Lycra, Orlon, Dacron"
- Music: Michael Brown
- Lyrics: Michael Brown
- Book: Michael Brown
- Productions: 1964 World's Fair

The Wonderful World of Chemistry is a 1964 industrial musical revue by Michael Brown. Regular performances were a feature of the DuPont Pavilion at the 1964 New York World's Fair.

The extravaganza of mid 20th century American material optimism extolled the virtues of DuPont products such as nylon, mylar, and corfam, featuring characters such as the Happy Plastic Family. The production was an early example of a multimedia production, as the players interacted with actors in film clips in parts of the show, this requiring split-second timing for the actors to remain in sync with the films.

Every day that we are living
is such a thrill
that we can't stay nonchalant!
Better things for better living
are coming still
– that's the promise of DuPont!

The 28-minute show, which was presented live 42 times a day by six different casts (with two running simultaneously in separate theaters) also traced the history of chemistry from Ancient Greece forward, and also featured players wearing high-end designer clothes made of DuPont fabrics (designers included Oleg Cassini, Ceil Chapman, and Donald Brooks).

The original production was directed as well as written by Michael Brown, with musical direction by Norman Paris and choreography by Hugh Lambert, Dorothy Love, and Buddy Schwab. Elliot Unger and Elliot produced the films, and animation was done by Ernest Pintoff.

The soundtrack was released by DuPont in 1964 on 7" vinyl, credited to the Norman Paris Quintet & Orchestra with backing vocals by the David Carter Singers.

No revivals are known to have been staged since the original run.

== Musical numbers ==
- "E.I. Du Pont De Nemours & Company"
- "Antron, Nylon, Lycra, Orlon, Dacron"
- "The Happy Plastics Family"
- "We're Gonna Have Shoes"
- "Better Things For Better Living"
- "All of Us Were Made for You"
