= Different Times (musical) =

- Playbill cover
- Music: Michael Brown
- Lyrics: Michael Brown
- Book: Michael Brown
- Productions: 1972 Broadway

Different Times is a musical with music, lyrics, and book by Michael Brown. It was originally produced on Broadway in 1972. It opened on May 1, 1972 at the ANTA Playhouse and closed on May 20, 1972 after 24 performances.

== Plot ==
The show follows a Boston family from 1905 to 1970. It covers the decades and the issues like women's rights, both World Wars, anti-Semitism, and youth protest.

== Song list ==
- Act 1
  - Different Times - Stephen Adams Levy
  - Seeing the Sights - People of 1905
  - The Spirit is Moving - Margaret Adams and People of 1905
  - Here's Momma - Margaret Adams
  - Everything in the World Has a Place - Gregory Adams and Margaret Adams
  - I Wish I Didn't Love Him - Margaret Adams
  - Forward Into Tomorrow - Mrs. Daniel Webster Hepplewhite and Suffragettes
  - You're Perfect - Angela Adams
  - Marianne - Officer, Doughboys, Marianne, Columbia and Kaiser
  - Daddy, Daddy - Hazelnuts
  - I Feel Grand - Hazel Hughes and Hazelnuts
  - Sock Life in the Eye - Larry Lawrence Levy
  - I'm Not Through - Larry Lawrence Levy and Marathon Dancers
- Act 2
  - I Miss Him - Hattie, Pauline and Mae Verne
  - One More Time - Kimberly Langley and Keynoters
  - Here's Momma (Reprise) - Stephen Adams Levy
  - I Dreamed About Roses - Stephen Adams Levy, Kimberly Langley and USO Guests
  - I Wish I Didn't Love Her (Reprise) - Gregory Adams
  - The Words I Never Said - Stephen Adams Levy and Kimberly Langley
  - The Life of a Woman - Kimberly Langley
  - Here's Momma (Reprise) - Kimberly Langley and Momma's Poppas
  - He Smiles - Abigail and Josie
  - Genuine Plastic - Stephen Adams Levy and Gallery Guests
  - Thanks a Lot - Frank, Abigail and Friends
  - When They Start Again - Abigail and Frank
  - Different Times (Reprise) - Stephen Adams Levy
  - The Spirit is Moving (Reprise) - Company

== Productions ==
The 1972 Broadway production was written and directed by Michael Brown, who also supplied the music and lyrics. It was choreographed by Todd Jackson, scenic design and costume design by David Guthrie, lighting design by Martin Aronstein and his partner Lawrence Metzler. It starred Karin Baker, Mary Jo Catlett, Candace Cooke, Ronnie DeMarco, Dorothy Frank, Patti Karr, Joe Masiell, Terry Nicholson, Joyce Nolen, Mary Bracken Phillips, Jamie Ross, Sam Stoneburner, David Thomé, Barbara Williams, and Ronald Young. In 1987, the original cast reassembled to make a recording that was issued on Painted Smiles Records.
