= Adrian Angelico =

Norwegian-Sámi opera singer

- Occupation: Opera singer (mezzo-soprano)
- Website: www.adrianangelico.com

Adrian Angelico is a Norwegian-Sámi operatic mezzo-soprano. Angelico is non-binary and is noted for interpretations of trouser roles and for integrating Sámi musical traditions into classical performance.

== Biography ==
Born in Tromsø, Norway

.

They debuted at the London Royal Opera House in June 2014, as Marquise de Merteuil in John Fulljames's production of Luca Francesconi's opera Quartett.

Angelico described themself as a trans man until 2024, when they came out as non-binary.

== See also ==
- Sámi people
