= Steve Young (writer) =

American television writer

Steve Young is a comedy writer, actor, songwriter, and performer best known for his time at Late Show with David Letterman and Late Night with David Letterman. He is a Harvard University graduate and former writer for the Harvard Lampoon. He also wrote the episode "Hurricane Neddy" of season eight of The Simpsons. Young adapted the holiday book Olive, the Other Reindeer for an animated holiday special and won an Annie Award for Outstanding Achievement for Writing in an Animated Television/Broadcast Production for the screenplay. Young's other television writing credits include Not Necessarily the News, Maya & Marty, Night of Too Many Stars, and Harry.

Young is the creator of "CelebriGum," a series of candid photographs depicting celebrities and a wad of chewing gum affixed to a second story window ledge of the Ed Sullivan Theater that were chronicled on a website beginning in 2010, and later exhibited at a gallery in Chelsea with the help of David Letterman.

Young is the co-author, along with Mike "Sport" Murphy, of the 2013 book Everything's Coming Up Profits – The Golden Age of Industrial Musicals, an illustrated history of musicals written for company conventions and sales meetings, told through the rare souvenir record albums. In 2016, film rights to the book were purchased by Steven Spielberg's company, Amblin Entertainment.

Young stars in the 2018 documentary Bathtubs Over Broadway which details his discovery and pursuit of industrial musicals. Young occasionally hosts and produces a live show entitled "The Weird and Wonderful World of Industrial Musicals."
