= Michael Brown (writer) =

American composer, lyricist, producer, writer (1920–2014)

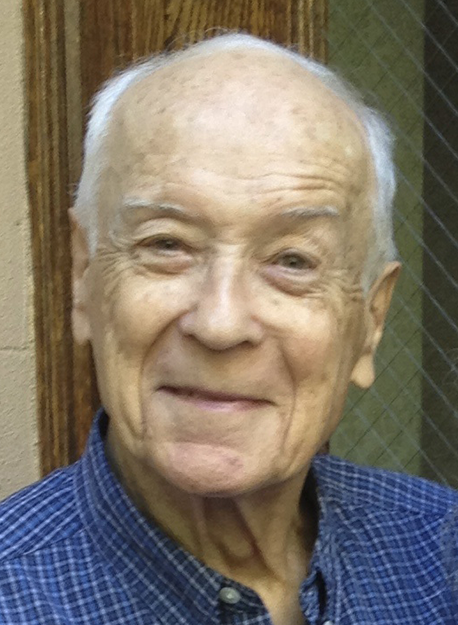
- Michael Brown in New York City, 2012
- Born: Marion Martin Brown II; December 14, 1920; Mexia, Texas, U.S.
- Died: June 11, 2014 (aged 93); New York City, U.S.
- Occupations: Composer, lyricist, producer, writer, director, performer

Michael Brown (December 14, 1920 – June 11, 2014) was an American composer, lyricist, writer, director, producer, and performer. He was born in Mexia, Texas. His musical career began in New York cabaret, performing first at Le Ruban Bleu. In the 1960s, he was a producer of industrial musicals for major American corporations such as J.C. Penney and DuPont. For the DuPont pavilion at the 1964 New York World's Fair, Brown wrote and produced a musical revue, The Wonderful World of Chemistry staged 48 times a day by two simultaneous casts in adjacent theaters. For years, he maintained a reunion directory of the cast and crew, which included Robert Downey, Sr. as a stage manager. 2005 mailing: “After all, it was a remarkable time in all of our lives. We can be fairly certain nothing like it will be seen again. Love all round, Mike.” Several of his songs have entered the American repertoire, including "Lizzie Borden" and "The John Birch Society," which were popularized by the Chad Mitchell Trio. Children know him best as the author of three Christmas books about Santa's helper, Santa Mouse.

== Cabaret and off-Broadway ==
His off-Broadway and cabaret contributions of music and lyrics were myriad. In 1948, performing his own music and lyrics, he auditioned for Julius Monk. His engagement at Le Ruban Bleu lasted a record 54 weeks. Returning to cabaret every ten years or so, he performed at The Blue Angel, the Ballroom, Plaza 9, Upstairs at the Downstairs, and The Savoy in London. He wrote the words and music for songs that were featured in all of Julius Monk's cabaret revues, including Four Below, 1956; Take Five, 1957; Four Below Strikes Back, 1959; Dressed to the Nines, 1960; Seven Come Eleven, 1961; Dime a Dozen, 1962; Baker's Dozen, 1964; and Bits and Pieces XIV, 1964. His songs for these revues included "Lola Montez," “Won't You Come Home, Judge Crater," “Love Letters Written to My Mother," “Don't Let Them Take the Paramount," and "The Third Avenue El.” Dan Dietz wrote about "The Third Avenue El": "This sweetly nostalgic song about the passing of a New York City landmark resonates more than ever today, and is particularly touching in its wish that vanished New York sites might always be with us, if not in concrete and steel, then at least in memory."

His musical, Is There Intelligent Life on Earth? was produced in Bristol, UK, in 1964. Songs in that production included "Blue-Green Planet," “Communicate with Me," “Serene Morning in Jersey," and "Goodbye, Old World.”

== Broadway ==
His first work on Broadway was the song "Lizzie Borden" in Leonard Sillman's New Faces of 1952 filmed as New Faces. It was later recorded by the Chad Mitchell Trio, who also recorded his "John Birch Society." In 2004, he wrote to Julie Harris: "There was never any objection—at least none that I heard—that the number was about a brutal double murder. Time seemed to tidy up all the blood. Even so, Leonard Sillman asked me to replace the original final chorus."

New Faces of 1952 was revived in 1982.

He wrote the lyrics to Harold Arlen’s music for Pearl Bailey’s show-stopping number "Indoor Girl" in House of Flowers. In 1956 he contributed the song "The Washingtons are Doing OK" for Leonard Sillman's New Faces of 1956. He also wrote a production number for the Carol Channing company of Sugar Babies.

Michael Brown wrote the book, lyrics, and music for the nineteen-day run of Different Times, and directed the production. The story followed multiple generations of one family, and was presented at the ANTA Theater, opening on May 1, 1972. The cast album was recorded in 1987.

== One-man show ==
In the 1970s, he wrote and extensively toured Out of Step: The Great American Nut Show in which he presented the results of his lifelong fascination with such people as John Dillinger, Starr Faithfull, Judge Crater, Aimee Semple McPherson, and the original Siamese twins, Chang and Eng. He shared his years of researching letters, rare photographs, newsreel footage, and examples of signs-of-the-times, through the use of slides, film, and song and dance. His songs to accompany the tale of each of his special people ranged from satirical comment, such as an unemotional campaign song for Calvin "Silent Cal" Coolidge, to sensitive ballads revealing a particular tragedy or grief in a person's life, such as Baby Doe Tabor. One of the most touching songs was his musical setting of "Starr Faithfull's Last Letter." She was a beautiful, young playgirl in the 1930s whose death remains a mystery to this day.

== Personal life ==
Brown started reading at age 4 and playing piano at age 6. In 1940, at the age of 19, he was a Phi Beta Kappa graduate of the Plan II program at the University of Texas, Austin. After attending Harvard University and the University of Iowa, he defended his master's thesis in English Literature, on the writer Wilkie Collins, at the University of Virginia. During World War II he enlisted in the Army Air Forces on April 6, 1944. He attended Officers’ Candidate School at Yale, where Glenn Miller played in the mess hall. He served with the 723rd Army Air Forces Base Unit as a Cryptographic Officer (0224). The bulk of his time was spent in the Caribbean where he wrote and performed songs when not deciphering phantom enemy submarine signals. Up to the time of his discharge on June 4, 1946, he used his name given at birth, Marion Martin Brown, II. He moved to New York City in 1947. Thereafter, he used the name Michael. In 1950 he married Joy Williams Brown, a former ballerina who trained at the School of American Ballet and joined Ballet Russe de Monte Carlo in New York at the invitation of George Balanchine. She also danced in Europe as a principal with Roland Petit's Les Ballets de Paris. Michael Brown became friends with Margot Fonteyn through his wife, Joy, and was thus introduced to the ballet world.

With his wife Joy, he had three children, Michael Martin Brown, Jr. of Hoboken, New Jersey, born in 1951; Kelly Kennedy Brown of Portland, Oregon, born in 1954; and Adam Anderson Brown born in 1964. Adam died in 1994.

Michael Brown died June 11, 2014, at the age of 93 New York City.

On November 4, 2014, a Memorial Celebration was held at the New York Public Library for the Performing Arts and speakers included Michael Feinstein, Jefferson Mays, and Charles Strouse.

== Harper Lee ==
The couple was instrumental in the career of Harper Lee, whom Michael met through his friend Truman Capote. The Browns made it possible for Lee to work on To Kill a Mockingbird by giving her the gift of a year's financial support in 1956 with the note: "You have one year off from your job to write whatever you please. Merry Christmas." Harper Lee wrote about this Christmas gift in McCalls magazine in December 1961. However, neither she nor the Browns ever disclosed their names, which led to years of speculation in literary circles until the 2006 publication of Charles J. Shields’ unauthorized biography Mockingbird: A Portrait of Harper Lee. Confirmation of the story occurred when the Browns broke their silence in interviews they gave for Mary Murphy’s documentary "Harper Lee: Hey, Boo" presented by PBS in the American Masters series in 2012.

== Santa Mouse ==
In 1966, as the result of a casual inquiry, he wrote the children's Christmas story Santa Mouse. That book was followed in 1968 by Santa Mouse Where Are You? and, in 1969, by Santa Mouse Meets Marmaduke. To avoid confusion with the Marmaduke comic strip, this was re-titled Santa Mouse Meets Montague when a compilation of all three books was republished under the title Santa Mouse Stories.

- Santa Mouse (1966, ISBN 0-448-10215-3)
- Santa Mouse, Where Are You (1968, ISBN 0-448-19109-1)
- Santa Mouse Meets Marmaduke (1969, ISBN 0-448-01859-4)
- Santa Mouse Treasury (1970, ISBN 0-448-34280-4)
- Santa Mouse Stories (2011, ISBN 978-1-4351-3684-7)

== Discography ==
Published LP Albums

- Michael Brown Sings his Own Songs, 1956
- Michael Brown: Alarums & Excursions, 1963

Industrial Musical LP Recordings

- Penneytown USA, 1952, for J.C. Penney Company
- W. T. Grant's 50th Anniversary Golden Opportunity, 1956, for W. T. Grant
- Fall Fashion Forecast, 1957, for E.I. du Pont de Nemours and Company
- It’s Holiday Time!, for Holiday Magazine
- Lead the Carefree Life... In the Holiday Mood, 1957, for E.I. du Pont de Nemours and Company, and Holiday Magazine
- Paris Affair, 1958, for Andrew Arkin Fashions
- Sing A Song of Sewing, 1960, for Donahue Sales Corporation
- Just Wear a Smile – and a Jantzen, 1960, for Jantzen, Inc
- A Birthday Garland For Mr. James Cash Penney, 1960, for J.C. Penney Company
- Penney Proud, 1962, for J.C. Penney Company
- The Wonderful World of Chemistry, 1964, for E.I. du Pont de Nemours and Company
- Mr. Woolworth had a Notion, 1965, for F.W. Woolworth Corporation
- Spirit of 66; An Evening with Michael Brown and his Friends, 1966, for J.C. Penney Company
- Big Belk Country, 1967, for Donahue Sales Corporation
- Big D Country, 1967, for Donahue Sales Corporation
- Seven Sons on a Seesaw, Brown’s ninth show for E.I. du Pont de Nemours and Company
- Music to Sell Dodges Buy, 1964, for Dodge Motor Company
- Marvelous Times, 1970, for J.C Penney Company
