= Industrial musical =

Music genre

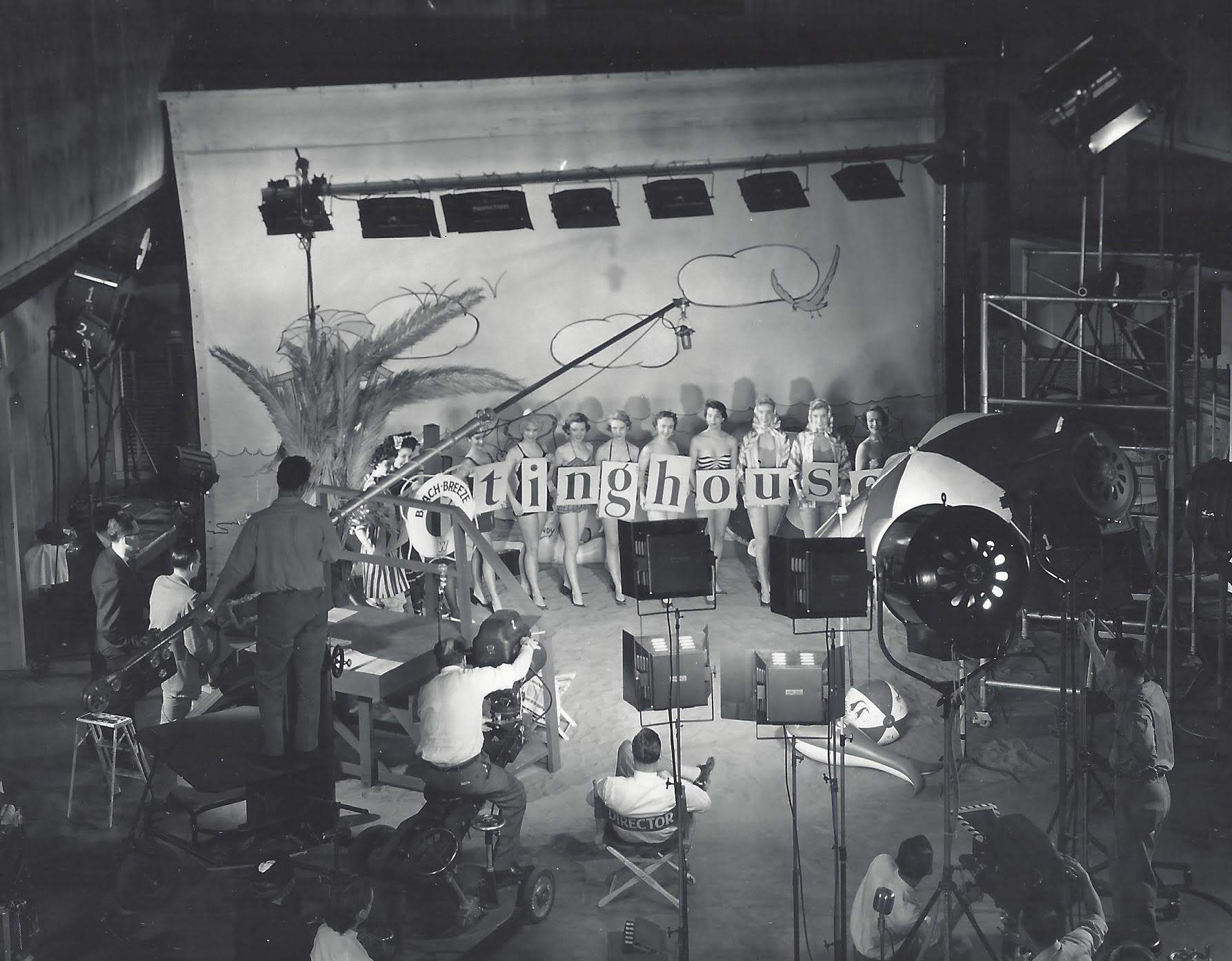
Production of A Fan Family Album, a 1954 industrial musical produced by Cinécraft Productions for a Westinghouse Electric distributor meeting.

An industrial musical is a musical performed internally for the employees or shareholders of a business to create a feeling of being part of a team, to entertain, and/or to educate and motivate the management and salespeople to improve sales and profits. It can be used to increase staff awareness of public relations, advertising, marketing or corporate image.

Other terms for industrial musicals include the corporate musical or industrial show, but the latter can also refer to trade shows, which are publicity events organized by businesses in a specific industry to promote their products to potential buyers.

Industrial musicals are not restricted to corporations or to businesses involved in industry. They should not be confused with industrial music or with musicals produced by businesses to be seen by the general public, such as Disney's stage production of The Lion King, for example.

== History ==
Industrial musicals originated from company songs, anthems and jingles for promoting enthusiasm among workers. The songs were brought in by the management, as opposed to worker-created work songs. Internal musical groups could be formed to encourage company loyalty, keep employees happy, and to help advertise the company to the public. Early 20th century examples include IBM's internal songbook Songs of the IBM, and the Larkin Soap Company which organized community singing and had a women's drum corps, an orchestra, a ukulele club, and daily recitals on a pipe organ.

At some point, a collection of company songs was extended into a full musical theater format, and the industrial musical was born. Many of these musicals were made in North America during the economic boom that followed World War II, and this practice continued into the 1980s and 1990s.

The earliest known industrial musicals were produced by retail and automotive companies such as Ford, General Motors, and the Marshall Field's chain of department stores. By the end of the 1950s and throughout the 1960s, other types of businesses also began to put on shows. Some musicals were part of annual showcase events for presenting a company's new line of products.

Businesses could spend a lot of money to produce a musical, hiring talented Broadway composers and lyricists. The pay was very good, the task was challenging, and from the theatre's point of view, the production costs were much higher than a regular Broadway musical. Shows could have as many as 30 people in the cast and a 60-piece orchestra. Composer Hank Beebe estimates that the 1957 Chevrolet musical was budgeted at over 3 million dollars (U.S.), because it cost six times the amount it took to bring My Fair Lady to the stage that same year.

The song performances were rarely heard outside of the companies they were written for, but sometimes the employees would be given a souvenir record album. Some productions lasted for a limited number of nights, while others traveled from city to city for regional sales meetings. According to composer John Kander, who conducted several industrial shows early in his career and wrote the music for the 1966 General Electric industrial Go Fly a Kite (the complete score from which was issued on a 2-LP set that was given to GE employees), the cast albums for these industrial shows "were never intended for commercial release. [...] It was sort of a separate world." Yet it is largely through these rare albums that evidence of these shows has survived.

By the 1980s, industrial musicals were made less and less often. Jonathan Ward, a writer and DJ who collects industrial musical albums, theorizes that the reason for the decline was partially due to rising production costs for stage shows, and the availability of low-cost video and multimedia technology.

Ward thinks another reason for the decline was a change in work attitudes. In the 1950s and 1960s, employees might have expected to spend the majority of their working careers with one company. By the 1980s, employees and the management may have been less inclined to think this way. The feelings of company loyalty and community promoted in the song lyrics would have been met with more cynicism.

Some corporations, however, continued to successfully produce industrial musicals during the 1980s and 1990s and beyond. The Shaklee Corporation created its own in-house production company in 1980. Their team, led by producer Dale T. Hardin, director Craig Schaefer, and composer/lyricist Michael Reno created dozens of Shaklee Shows from concept to performance, and eventually branched out into in-house satellite TV. The Shaklee creative team created their own production company called "Command Performance Productions" that produced shows for other clients such as Charles Schwab and Marriott Lodging until 2000.

Despite the trends that affected industrial musicals, businesses have continued to make company songs. For example, KPMG produced a corporate anthem in 2001 titled "Our Vision of Global Strategy."

In 2013, the first book on the history of industrial musicals, titled Everything's Coming Up Profits, was published, written by Steve Young and Mike "Sport" Murphy. A series of industrial music audio anthologies, organized by decade, accompanied the book. In 2018, Bathtubs Over Broadway, a documentary on industrial musicals and Steve Young's quest to discover their creators, premiered at the Tribeca Film Festival. The fourth episode of the fifth season of The Marvelous Mrs. Maisel involves the title character being cast in a fictional industrial musical about waste management.

== Titles of industrial musicals ==
- 1000 and One! – Oldsmobile (1954 for the '55 model year)
- A Birthday Garland for Mr. James Cash Penney – JCPenney (1960)
- A Fan Family Album – Westinghouse (1954) (History of electric fans)
- AM Route 66 – American Motors (1965 for the '66 model year)
- Bill Pay The Musical! - Ramp (2026)
- Building a Better Way to See the U.S.A. – Chevrolet (1971 for the '72 model year)
- Diesel Dazzle – General Motors (1966)
- Go Fly A Kite – General Electric (1966)
- Going Great! – American Motors (1963 for the '64 model year)
- Good News about Olds – Oldsmobile (1958 for the '59 model year)
- Got To Investigate Silicones – General Electric (1973) (about Silicones)
- J.C. Penney 1952 Show – JCPenney (1952)
- Olay Live: The Road to Gold - Olay (2019)
- Once in a Lifetime – Edsel (1957)
- Penney Proud – JCPenney (1962)
- Take It From Here – Xerox (1963 - for release of Xerox 813 copier)
- The Bathrooms Are Coming – American Standard (1969)
- The Chevrolet Experience – Chevrolet (1976 for the '77 model year)
- The Grip of Leadership – Coca-Cola (1961 - 75th anniversary)
- The Mighty "O" – Oldsmobile (1953 for the '54 model year)
- The New Wide World of Ford – Ford (1964)
- The Shape of Tomorrow – Westinghouse (1958)
- Skittles the Musical - Skittles (2019)
- The Spark of Imagination – The Shaklee Corporation (1994)
- The Wonderful World of Chemistry – DuPont for the 1964 New York World's Fair (1964)
- This is Oldsmobility – Oldsmobile (1957 for the '58 model year)
- This is the Year That Is! – Plymouth/Chrysler/Imperial (1964 for the '65 model year)
- Who Could Ask for Anything More? – Oldsmobile (1959 for the '60 model year)
- You Belong in a Dodge - Dodge (1969 for the '70 model year)
- You're The Top – Oldsmobile (1960 for the '61 model year)

== Composers and lyricists ==
- Hank Beebe
- Jerry Bock
- Michael Brown
- Sheldon Harnick
- Bill Heyer
- Max Hodge
- Kander and Ebb
- Sonny Kippe
- Lloyd Norlin
- Skip Redwine
- Michael Reno
- Raymond Scott
- Sid Siegel
- Wilson Stone
- Thomas Tierney
- Charles Title

== See also ==
- Advertising
- Multi-image
- Musical theater
- Sponsored film
