= Lerner and Loewe =

20th-century American songwriting team

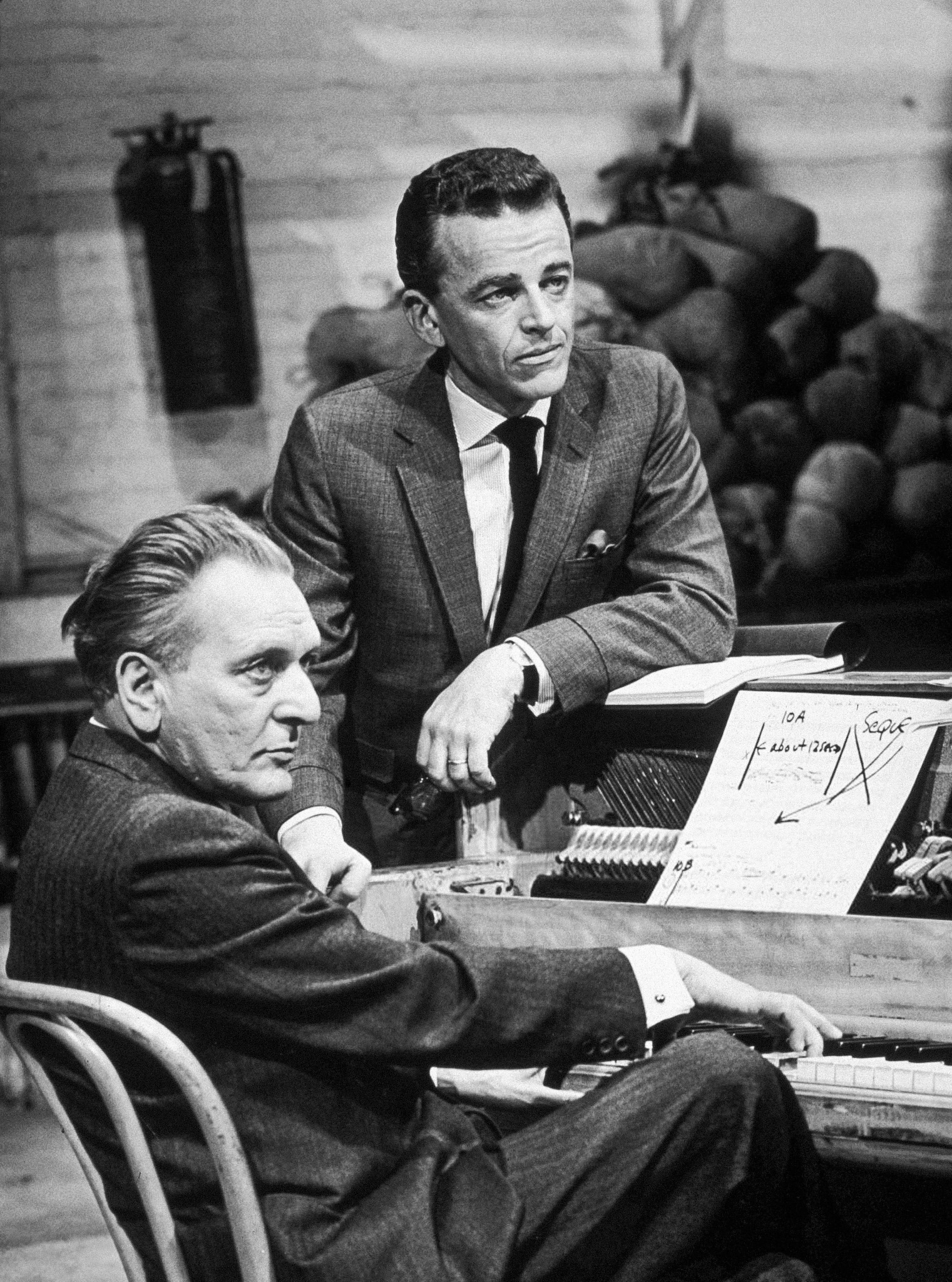
Loewe and Lerner, c. 1962

Lerner and Loewe is the partnership between lyricist and librettist Alan Jay Lerner and composer Frederick Loewe. Spanning three decades and nine musicals from 1942 to 1960 and again from 1970 to 1972, the pair are known for being behind the creation of critical on stage successes such as My Fair Lady, Brigadoon, and Camelot along with the musical film Gigi.

== Background and previous work ==
Growing up in Austria, Frederick or "Fritz" Loewe was a child prodigy concert pianist and son to a Viennese operetta star, Edmond Loewe. After moving to New York City, he worked as a pianist in German clubs and was accompanist for silent films but never had a partnership before working with Lerner. Conversely, Alan Lerner was born in New York City and attended Harvard where his first musical theater contributions came from working on collegiate Hasty Pudding musicals. Early in his career at Harvard he collaborated with Leonard Bernstein but also did not have any official partnerships until he crossed paths with Loewe.

== Meeting ==
In August 1942 at the Lambs Club in New York City 24 year old American, Alan Jay Lerner and 41 year old Austrian, Frederick Loewe, officially met each other. As recounted by Lerner, the two met by chance when Loewe took a wrong turn on his way to the bathroom. Loewe asked Lerner if he wrote lyrics and upon affirmation, Loewe asked if he wanted to write with him. The two began working together immediately afterward.

== Early work ==
While the two were quick to work with each other, the initial two musicals Jay Lerner and Frederick Loewe worked on were not a commercial success and would be heavily regarded today as "flops." The very first of their collaborations, Life of the Party, was worked on in 1942 at a stock company in Detroit, ran for 9 weeks and never made it to a Broadway stage. The first of their productions to make it to Broadway was What's Up?, which received generally (if mildly) favorable reviews but was not a commercial success. Lerner later wrote that the musical ran for only one week before closing, but it in fact ran from November 11, 1943, to January 4, 1944, closing after 63 performances.

The pair achieved some small success in 1945 with The Day Before Spring. This production opened at the National Theatre in late November and closed approximately one year later in April 1946. Despite the short run, a Billboard magazine critic gave the musical a favorable review from its opening at the Shubert Theatre in Boston and deemed Lerner and Loewe "potential supermen."

=== Brigadoon ===
Brigadoon was the pair's first significant hit. Loewe and Lerner reportedly auditioned their music fifty times before successfully finding investors to help mount their production. Brigadoon's plot centers on two New York natives who are visiting the highlands of Scotland. While there, they happen upon a village that is enchanted by magic to appear only once every century. The material was said to be inspired by the stories of James M. Barrie and also a direct quote from Frederick Loewe: "faith can move mountains." The original Broadway production opened in 1947 at the Ziegfeld Theatre and won the Drama Critics Award for Best Musical of the Year. In 1949 Brigadoon opened at the West End Theatre in London. It has been revived successfully several times. A film starring Gene Kelly and Cyd Charisse was also made.

=== Paint Your Wagon ===
Regarded by the duo as a "success, but not a hit", Paint Your Wagon opened in 1951 at the Shubert Theatre to mixed reviews. The story takes place in California during the Gold Rush and focuses on the relationship between a father who works as a miner and his daughter. Two years after its New York opening, the musical made its West End debut in 1953 and ran for nearly 500 performances. Years later, in 1969, Lerner asked Loewe to return to the project to specifically write new songs for the film version. Loewe, who had since retired, declined, but gave Lerner permission to collaborate with Andre Previn for the additional songs. The one rule Jay Lerner and Frederick Loewe abided by for the entirety of their partnership was that if one wished to work with another lyricist or composer, he must tell the other; this also applied for any time someone requested to work with either one of them. While Lerner received permission and created new songs with Previn specifically for the film, the reception of the movie musical was predominantly negative. The most popular songs from this musical were written in its earliest stages with both Lerner and Loewe at the helm, including "I Was Born Under a Wand'rin' Star", "They Call the Wind Maria" and "I Talk To The Trees."

=== My Fair Lady ===
My Fair Lady opened on Broadway at the Mark Hellinger Theatre. While both Lerner and Loewe were interested in adapting George Bernard Shaw's play Pygmalion into a musical, early on in the process they struggled significantly with creating a musical that would fit the musical constructs in place at the time, i.e. a flashy chorus and large ballet sequences. After many frustrated work sessions and the input of Oscar Hammerstein, who had also tried to adapt the play with Richard Rodgers and failed, Lerner and Loewe abandoned the project.

During their break from what would be regarded by many as their most successful musical, Lerner concentrated his efforts on a musical based on the Li'l Abner comic, but was one day reminded of Pygmalion when he came across news of the passing of Gabriel Pascal, the film producer who had brought the opportunity to the duo in the first place.

After reevaluating the state of the musical theater "rules"—or, rather, the new lack of them—and determining that it was no longer necessary to have a subplot or a larger-than-life ensemble, in 1954 both Lerner and Loewe resumed the project and continued their efforts on the adaptation.

The main goal of Lerner and Loewe was not simply to do justice to the original text, but to create the right songs to emphasize character. It took many failed attempts, tossing out unneeded songs and long hours at the piano before coming across the style they both wished to utilize, the dramatization of characters' inner turmoil. It was during work on this musical that Lerner and Loewe spent the most time perfecting songs. This came not just from playing music at the piano, but of talking out moments in the musical and what they both wanted to achieve from these moments.

Lerner has said of Loewe's style that, when they were at the piano, he would often enter dreamlike states where he would continuously play until a musical moment appeared that they were both overjoyed with.

It wasn't until the tail end of the process, with previews looming, that Lerner and Loewe finally decided on a name for the musical. Loewe's vote was for "Fanfaroon," but Lerner believed that bore too close a resemblance to Brigadoon. He, along with the rest of the creative team, decided that out of all their options, they disliked My Fair Lady the least.

The year it opened My Fair Lady won 6 of the 10 Tony Awards for which it was nominated and also won the Theatre World Award for Outstanding New York City Stage Debut Performance. During the time it played it set the record for the longest running Broadway musical, and has had numerous revivals since the original production.

=== Gigi ===
Four years after My Fair Lady opened, Lerner sought to collaborate with Loewe on a film. Due to it being outside of stage work, Loewe at first passed on the opportunity, but relented after reading the script.

While in Paris preparing to shoot, Lerner, being more likely to make impulsive decisions, bought a blue Rolls-Royce and convinced Loewe to buy a grey one in an exchange that lasted less than five minutes at the car dealership. The very first film preview of Gigi was not well-received, and it was a combination of the reactions and Lerner and Loewe's own unhappiness with the film that led them to rewrite and re-shoot it, costing them $300,000.

However, these changes were well-received and Gigi won nine Academy Awards, at that time holding the record for the most Oscars won by a single film production.

=== Camelot ===
Much like Pygmalion, inspiration for Camelot came to Lerner from a book, this time, T.H White's The Once and Future King. Loewe had to be more strongly convinced of its commercial appeal, but ultimately was won over.

Camelot was an immensely difficult production for the duo, with the opening preview running four and a half hours and the director, Moss Hart, hospitalized with a heart attack in the middle of previews, forcing Lerner to take over as director and causing tension between Lerner and Loewe. While it was at first difficult to gain the traction they were looking for, the cast's appearance on the Ed Sullivan Show brought the production great success and ended up resulting in Camelot's total profits grossing over seven figures.

Loewe had previously stated to Lerner that Camelot would be his final show before his retirement and, true to his word, he parted ways with Lerner.

== Working relationship and personalities ==
One element Lerner stated was instrumental to his partnership with Loewe was Loewe's patience. Lerner's creative process could take as little as a few hours, and as much as a few weeks, yet he never felt pressured nor shamed by his counterpart. While Loewe did not require as long periods of time to compose his music as Lerner required to write lyrics, he could often be very uncertain in his choices and Lerner was able to provide him with reassurance.

The two were also partial to working in the early morning, particularly Lerner, who believed all his best writing was done as soon as he awakened.

In terms of personality, the two could not be more opposite. Lerner, the younger of the two who was raised in New York, always had an eagerness about him and was quick speaking and moving. Loewe, the older of the two who was brought up in Austria, was more experienced and cynical. However, each appreciated the other and they developed a very deep friendship.

Lerner said this of Loewe:

There will never be another Fritz... Writing will never again be as much fun. A collaboration as intense as ours inescapably had to be complex. But I loved him more than I understood or misunderstood him and I know he loved me more than he understood or misunderstood me.

In The New York Times obituary for Loewe, it was written: "Near the creative peak of their collaboration, Mr. Lerner characterized his working relationship with Mr. Loewe as pleasant and respectful."

== Final collaboration ==
Their final collaboration was on the 1974 musical film The Little Prince. The All Movie reviewer wrote: "Although Alan Jay Lerner and Frederick Loewe crafted a hummable and entertaining score, it is not among their best work; worse, its tone and style are frequently at odds with the story."

== List of theatre works ==
- Life of the Party (1942)
- What's Up? (1943)
- The Day Before Spring (1945)
- Brigadoon (1947)
- Paint Your Wagon (1951)
- My Fair Lady (1956)
- Camelot (1960)
- Gigi (1973) – stage version adapted from the film

== Films and film adaptations ==
- Brigadoon (1954)
- Gigi (1958)
- My Fair Lady (1964)
- Camelot (1967)
- Paint Your Wagon (1969)
- The Little Prince (1974)
