= Frederick Loewe =

American composer (1901–1988)

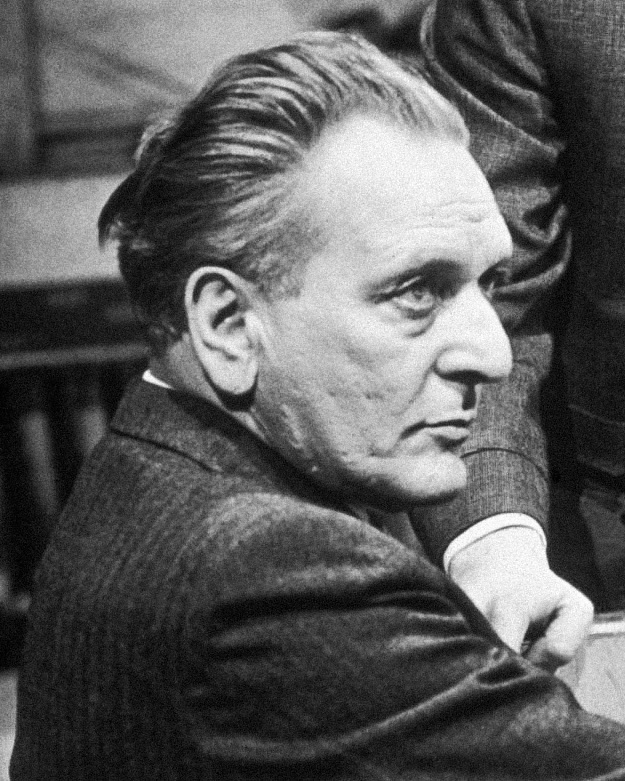
- Loewe c. 1962

Background information
- Born: Friedrich "Fritz" Löwe; June 10, 1901; Charlottenburg, Berlin, Germany
- Origin: New York City, U.S.
- Died: February 14, 1988 (aged 86) Palm Springs, California, U.S.
- Genres: Broadway theatre musicals
- Occupations: Musician; composer; lyricist

Frederick Loewe (/loʊ/ LOH; born Friedrich "Fritz" Löwe, German: [ˈfʁiːdʁɪç fʁɪts ˈløːvə]; June 10, 1901 – February 14, 1988) was an American composer. He collaborated with lyricist Alan Jay Lerner on a series of Broadway musicals, including Brigadoon, Paint Your Wagon, My Fair Lady, and Camelot, all of which were made into films, as well as the original film musical Gigi (1958), which was first transferred to the stage in 1973.

== Biography ==
Loewe was born in Charlottenburg, Berlin, Germany, to Viennese parents Edmund and Rosa Loewe. His father was a Jewish operetta star who performed throughout Europe and in North and South America; he starred as Count Danilo in the 1906 Berlin production of The Merry Widow.

Loewe grew up in Berlin and attended a Prussian cadet school from the age of five until he was thirteen. At an early age Loewe learned to play piano by ear and helped his father rehearse, and he began composing songs at age seven. He eventually attended the Stern Conservatory in Berlin, one year behind Claudio Arrau, and studied with Ferruccio Busoni and Eugene d'Albert. He won the coveted Hollander Medal awarded by the school and gave performances as a concert pianist while still in Germany. At 13, he was the youngest piano soloist ever to appear with the Berlin Philharmonic.

In 1924, his father received an offer to appear in New York City, and Loewe traveled there with him, determined to write for Broadway. This proved to be difficult. He eventually found work playing piano in German clubs in Yorkville and in movie theaters as the accompanist for silent films. In 1931, he married Ernestine Zerline. Childless, they divorced in 1957.

Loewe began to visit the Lambs Club, a hangout for theater performers, producers, managers and directors. He credited The Lambs for keeping him working until his career expanded, and left a share of his royalties of Brigadoon to The Lambs Foundation. He met Alan Jay Lerner there in 1942. Their first collaboration was a musical adaptation of Barry Connor's farce The Patsy, called Life of the Party, for a Detroit stock company. It enjoyed a nine-week run and encouraged the duo to join forces with Arthur Pierson for What's Up?, which opened on Broadway in 1943. It ran for 63 performances and was followed by The Day Before Spring, which ran on Broadway from November 1945 to April 1946.

Their first hit was Brigadoon, a romantic fantasy set in a mystical Scottish village, directed by Robert Lewis with choreography by Agnes de Mille. The musical ran on Broadway from March 1947 to July 1948 and won the 1947 New York Drama Critics' Circle award as Best Musical. It spawned the songs "Almost Like Being in Love" and "The Heather on the Hill", both of which became standards. It was followed in 1951 by the less successful Gold Rush story Paint Your Wagon, which despite its lukewarm critical reception included several songs which went on to become popular, including "Wand'rin' Star" and "They Call the Wind Maria".

In 1956, Lerner and Loewe's My Fair Lady was produced on Broadway. Their adaptation of George Bernard Shaw's Pygmalion, with the leads, Henry Higgins and Eliza Doolittle, being played originally by Rex Harrison and Julie Andrews, was a huge hit on Broadway and in London. The musical won the Tony Award for Best Musical. Metro-Goldwyn-Mayer took notice and commissioned them to write the film musical Gigi (1958), which won nine Academy Awards, including Best Picture.

Their next Broadway musical was Camelot in 1960. The production starred Richard Burton, Julie Andrews and Robert Goulet. According to Playbill, "The show achieved an unprecedented advance sale of three and a half million dollars, propelled in part by a preview on the Ed Sullivan Show that featured its stars, Richard Burton and Julie Andrews." Camelot ran for 873 performances.

Loewe then decided to retire to Palm Springs, California, where he bought a home in 1960. For many years he did not write anything until he was approached by Lerner to augment the Gigi film score with additional tunes for a 1973 stage adaptation, which won him his second Tony, this time for Best Original Score.

In 1974, they collaborated on a musical film version of The Little Prince, based on the classic children's tale by Antoine de Saint-Exupéry. This film was a critical failure, but the soundtrack recording and the film itself are in print on CD and DVD. Loewe and Lerner were nominated for the 1974 Academy Award for Best Song and Best Adapted or Original Song Score (with Angela Morley and Douglas Gamley).

Loewe was inducted into the Songwriters Hall of Fame in 1972. Seven years later, in 1979, he was inducted into the American Theater Hall of Fame.

Loewe remained in Palm Springs until his death at 86. The cause of death was cardiac arrest, according to John F. Morris, an artist and longtime friend. He had a Golden Palm Star on the Palm Springs Walk of Stars dedicated to him in 1995. He was buried in the Desert Memorial Park in Cathedral City, California.
