= What's Up? (musical) =

- Playbill for the original Broadway production
- Music: Frederick Loewe
- Lyrics: Alan Jay Lerner
- Book: Alan Jay Lerner; Arthur Pierson
- Productions: 1943 Broadway

What's Up? is a musical notable as the first Broadway stage collaboration by Lerner and Loewe, with book by Arthur Pierson and Alan Jay Lerner, lyrics by Lerner, and music by Frederick Loewe.

== Production ==
After meeting, the team of Lerner and Loewe started writing musicals, resulting in The Life of the Party (1942) and their first Broadway production, What's Up?.

The musical opened on Broadway at the National Theatre on November 11, 1943, and closed on January 4, 1944, after 63 performances. Directed and choreographed by George Balanchine, with the book directed by Robert H. Gordon, the cast included Jimmy Savo, Johnny Morgan, Gloria Warren, and Pat Marshall.

According to theatre historian Ken Bloom "Despite the talents on hand, the show was not a hit."

== Musical numbers ==
Act I

- "Miss Langley's School for Girls" — Jayne and Girls
- "From the Chimney to the Cellar" — Jayne and Girls
- "You've Got a Hold on Me" — Margaret and Sgt. Willie Klink
- "A Girl Is Like a Book" — Cpt. Robert Lindsay
- "Joshua" — Margaret
- "Three Girls in a Boat" — Margaret, Jayne and Susan
- "How Fly Times" — Sgt. Willie Klink, Sgt. Dick Benham and Fliers
- "My Last Love" — Jayne, Sgt. Willie Klink, Margaret, Sgt. Moroney and Sgt. Dick Benham

Act II

- "You Wash and I'll Dry" — Margaret, Sgt. Willie Klink, Susan and Second Lt. Murray Bacchus
- "You Wash and I'll Dry" (Reprise) — Virginia Miller
- "The Ill-Tempered Clavichord" — Jayne and Susan
- "You've Got a Hold on Me" (Reprise) — Virginia Miller, Sgt. Dick Benham, Fliers and Girls

== Cast ==
Character	Actor
Sgt. Henry Wagner	Jack Baker
Louise	Sondra Barrett
Second Lt. Murray Bacchus	Robert Bay
May	Marjorie Beecher
Sgt. Jimmy Stevenson	Kenneth Buffett
Sgt. Willie Klink	Larry Douglas
Margaret	Lynn Gardner
Jennifer	Phyllis Hill
Doctor	Frank Kreig
Martha	Sara Macon
Susan	Pat Marshall
Cpt. Robert Lindsay	Rodney McLennan
Harriet Spinner	Claire Meade
Sgt. Moroney	Johnny Morgan
Pamela	Honey Murray
Eleanor	Mitzi Perry
Jayne	Mary Roche
Rawa of Tanglinia	Jimmy Savo
Sgt. Dick Benham	William Tabbert
Virginia Miller	Gloria Warren
First Lt. Ed Anderson	Don Weissmuller
Judy	Helen Wenzel

== Reception ==
The New York Times reviewer wrote: "No doubt it is only an habitual pessimist who can look at 'What's Up' and find it not altogether to his liking. All the elements of a Broadway musical show are there. The tunes are fairly catchy. Jimmy Savo -- who undoubtedly is among the great folk of the world -- is present."

Theater historian Gerald Bordman wrote that Balanchine gave Savo "one of the evenings most delightful moments with the forlorn little comedian pursuing an Amazonian ballerina...yet the best dancing of the evening came...in Don Weissmuller's show-stopping tap routines...the book revealed that Lerner had a lot to learn about writing librettos."

The musical was "a negligible wartime musical about aviators quarantined in a boarding school for girls with the expected results."

Theatre historian Stanley Green commented: "Even with Jimmy Savo in the cast and George Balanchine as director, it was not an auspicious debut."
