= Nederlander Theatre =

Broadway theater in Manhattan, New York

- National Theatre, Billy Rose Theatre, Trafalgar Theatre
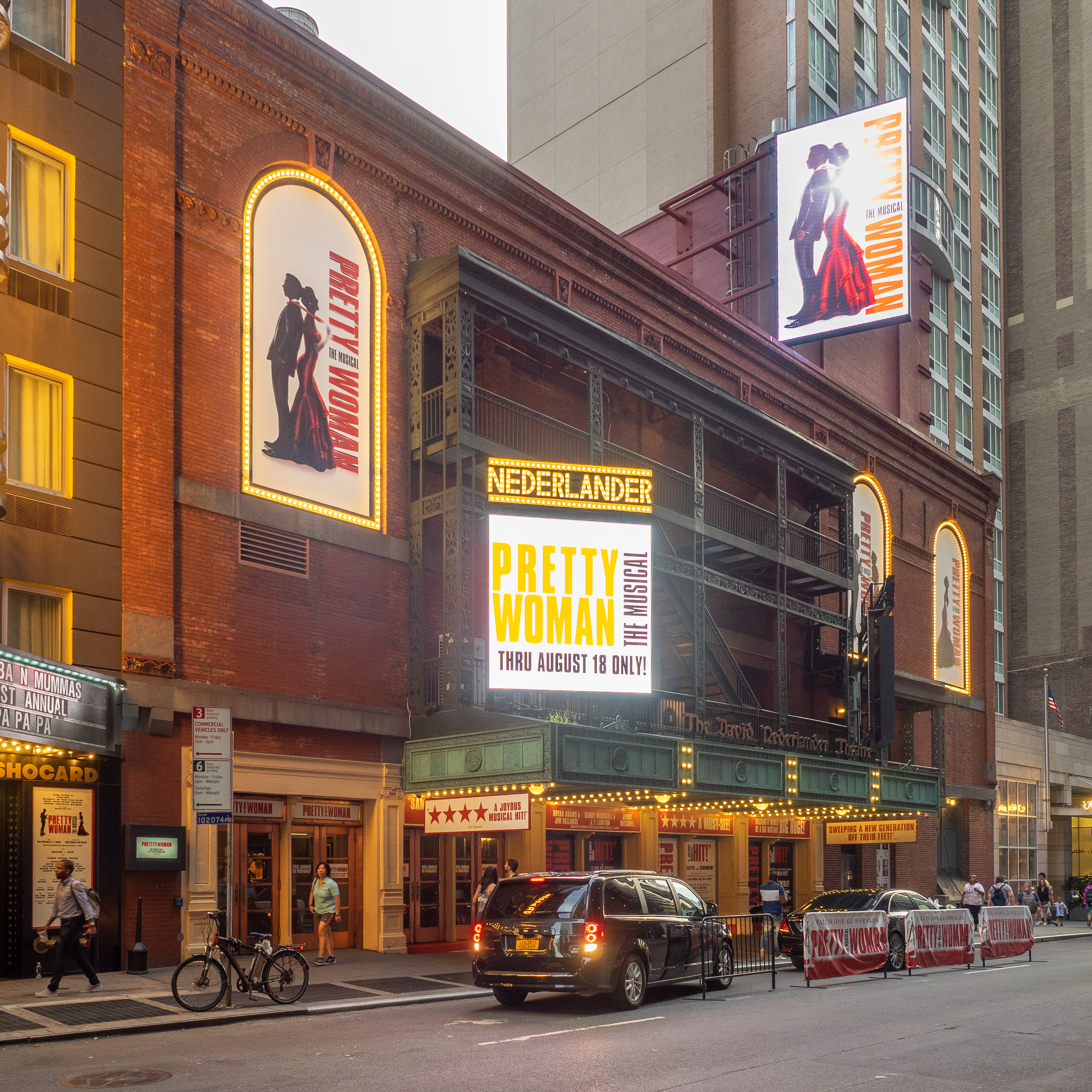
- With Pretty Woman on the facade
- Interactive map of Nederlander Theatre
- Address: 208 West 41st Street; Manhattan, New York; United States
- Coordinates: 40°45′20″N 73°59′18″W
- Owner: Nederlander Organization
- Capacity: 1,232 (Note: This capacity is approximate and may vary depending on the show.)
- Type: Broadway
- Production: Schmigadoon!

Construction
- Opened: September 1, 1921 (105 years ago)
- Architect: William Neil Smith

Website
- broadwaydirect.com/venue/nederlander-theatre/

The Nederlander Theatre (formerly the National Theatre, the Billy Rose Theatre, and the Trafalgar Theatre) is a Broadway theater at 208 West 41st Street in the Theater District of Midtown Manhattan in New York City, New York, U.S. Opened in 1921, it was designed by William Neil Smith for theatrical operator Walter C. Jordan. It has around 1,235 seats across two levels and is operated by the Nederlander Organization. Since 1980, it has been named for American theater impresario David Tobias Nederlander, father of theatrical producer James M. Nederlander. It is the southernmost Broadway theater in the Theater District.

The facade is relatively plain and is made of brick, with a fire escape at the center of the second and third floors. The auditorium was originally designed in the early Renaissance style, which has since been modified several times. Unlike other theaters operated by the Shubert family, the interior contained little plaster decoration. The venue has hosted a variety of shows, including the plays Cyrano de Bergerac, Inherit the Wind, and Who's Afraid of Virginia Woolf?; live performances, including those by Lena Horne; and the musical Rent, which is the theater's longest-running production as of 2022.

The modern-day Nederlander Theatre was developed as a carpenter's shop in 1920 before being converted into the National Theatre the following year. When the National opened on September 1, 1921, the Shubert family managed bookings on Jordan's behalf. The Shubert brothers bought the National in 1927 and operated it for three decades. In 1956, as part of a settlement in an antitrust lawsuit, the Shuberts sold the venue to Harry Fromkes, who died shortly thereafter. The National was acquired in 1958 by theatrical producer Billy Rose, who renovated the venue and renamed it after himself the next year. The Nederlander Organization and the Cooney-Marsh Organization acquired the theater in 1978, first renaming it the Trafalgar Theatre; the theater assumed its current name in 1980. Because there were few other Broadway theaters nearby, the Nederlander housed few productions in the late 20th century, becoming popular only after Rent opened.

== Site ==
The Nederlander Theatre is on 208 West 41st Street, between Seventh Avenue and Eighth Avenue near the southern end of Times Square, in the Theater District of Midtown Manhattan in New York City, New York, U.S. The rectangular land lot covers 10,961 square feet (1,018.3 m^{2}), with a frontage of 111 feet (34 m) on 41st Street and a depth of 98.75 feet (30 m). The Nederlander Theatre abuts a hotel and a parking garage, both of which have existed since before the theater was completed in 1921. The city block is shared with the New York Times Building to the west. Additionally, the building is near the Candler Building, Madame Tussauds New York, Empire Theatre, and Eleven Times Square to the northwest; the New Amsterdam Theatre and 5 Times Square to the north; and the Times Square Tower to the northeast.

The Nederlander is the southernmost Broadway theater in the Theater District. When the theater was built, the Metropolitan Opera House and seven other theaters were to the south and east, although all of them were closed and demolished by the late 20th century. The lack of other Broadway theaters nearby, and its location at the extreme south end of the Theater District, contributed to its relative unpopularity in the late 20th century. This sharply contrasted with venues on 42nd Street, a major crosstown artery, and venues on 44th and 45th Streets, which benefited from tourist traffic around Shubert Alley.

== Design ==
The theater was designed by William Neil Smith for Walter C. Jordan. The theater contains a floor area of 24,975 square feet (2,320.3 m^{2}), as well as 130,825 square feet (12,154.0 m^{2}) of unused air rights.

=== Facade ===
The brick facade is relatively plain, blending in with other buildings on 41st Street. At ground level are entrances to the theater. There is an iron fire escape on the second and third floors of the facade. There are doors and windows on both levels that lead to the fire escape, and a metal canopy covers the fire escape. Above ground level, there are three arches on the facade: one to the left of the fire escape and two to the right. These archways originally contained windows at the second and third floors and are topped by keystones. A cornice with modillions runs above the top of the facade. Unlike other Broadway theaters, the Nederlander does not have a dedicated stage door, so all performers use the main entrance.

When the theater was renamed the Billy Rose Theatre in 1959, the facade was repainted white, leading Newsweek magazine to describe it as "an architect's memory of New Orleans' French Quarter". During the production of the musical Rent between 1996 and 2008, the facade was covered with fake graffiti.

=== Auditorium ===
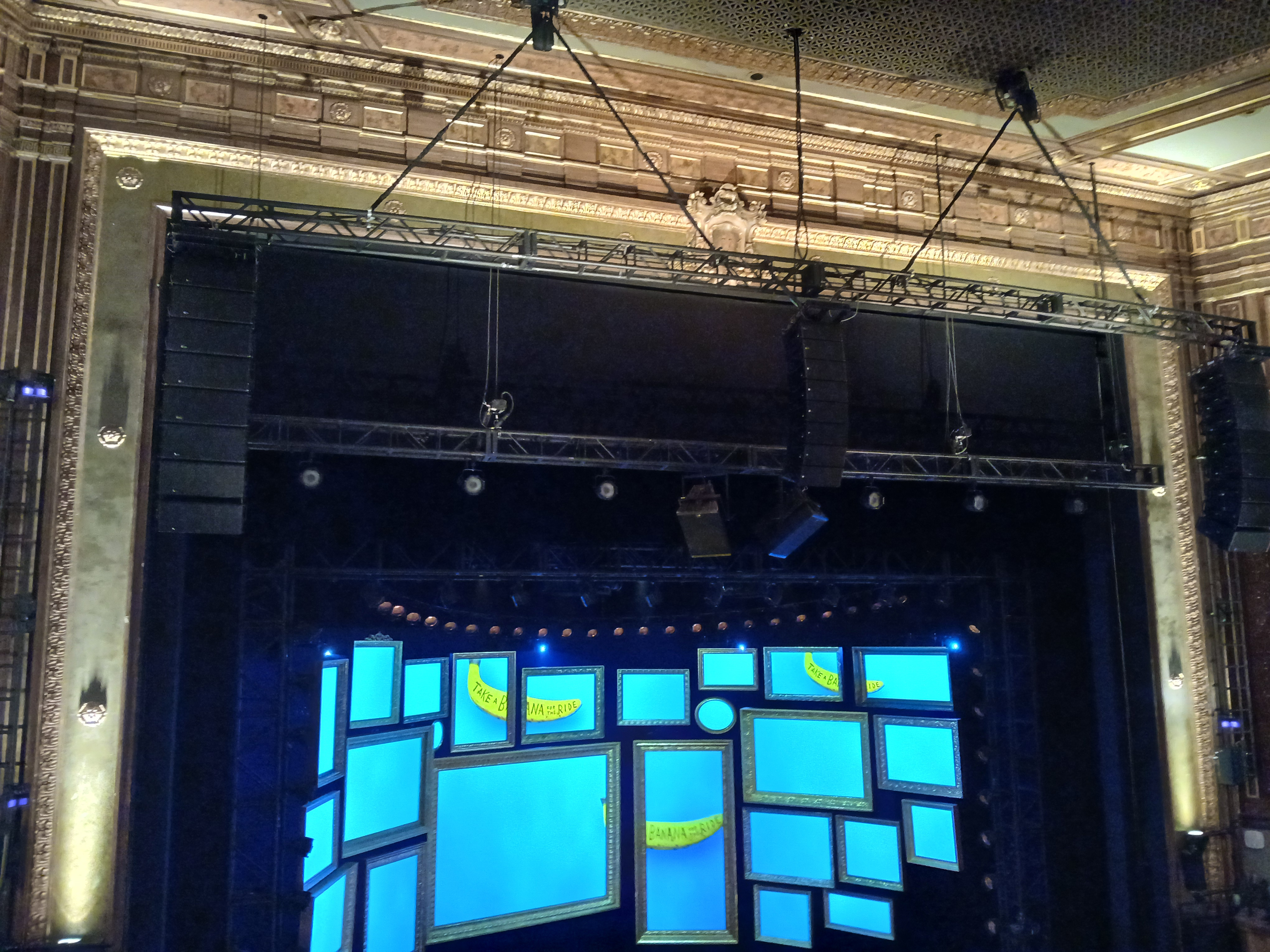
The auditorium as seen from the balcony level

The Nederlander Theatre has an orchestra level and one balcony. The theater was built with 1,200 seats. According to the Broadway League, the theater has 1,235 seats; meanwhile, Playbill gives a figure of 1,168 seats. Only the orchestra level is wheelchair-accessible; the other seating levels can only be reached by steps. The restrooms are at the first balcony level. The balcony is raked, sloping downward toward the stage. In contrast to other theaters, the underside of the balcony slopes upward, increasing visibility at the rear of the orchestra. The orchestra level slopes down toward an orchestra pit in front of the stage. To improve acoustics, the floor of the orchestra pit contained shards of glass, which were then laid atop a concrete slab.

Originally, the auditorium was designed in the early Renaissance style. Unlike other theaters operated by the Shubert family, the interior contained little plaster decoration. The interior was made of concrete, which was decorated to resemble burnished Italian walnut panels decorated with gold. The fake woodwork was decorated with "lyric and epic subjects", which protruded slightly from the walnut panels. The walls and balustrades were grained to give the impression of woodwork. Actual carved wood was used for lintels and sills. There were 18 multicolored lights on the auditorium's ceiling, and a 12-foot-tall (3.7 m) crystal chandelier was suspended from the center of the ceiling. At the rear of the auditorium was a projector. The proscenium arch at the front of the auditorium is 40 feet (12 m) tall. The arch contained a few classical details, and its keystone was originally decorated with the letter "N". The arch was initially flanked by one tier of boxes in a streamlined style. The stage itself is 86 feet (26 m) wide, with a height of 100 feet (30 m) from the floor to the overhead gridiron.

When Billy Rose renovated the theater in 1959, he made a variety of changes, including repainting the auditorium red, white, and gold. The auditorium's light boxes were originally flanked by plaster cornucopias, but Rose largely replaced them with curlicues. In addition, the original lighting fixtures were replaced with 1950s-style chandeliers; the central chandelier was surrounded by four smaller chandeliers. The arch's keystone was replaced with an "R" keystone after Rose renovated the theater. Rose added a second tier of Moorish-style boxes purely for decorative effect. The carpet was redesigned in 1996 and again in 2008. Most of the original decoration was restored in 2008, when Rose's second tier of boxes was redesigned in a streamlined style.

The south wall of the auditorium contained emergency-exit doors to an alleyway, which was converted into a smoking lounge in 1959. Performers used this alleyway during intermissions if they did not want to interact with members of the public. The backstage area contained dressing rooms with bathrooms and windows, which local media described at the time as "the last word in utility and luxury". The theater had been built as a fireproof structure with skylights, water tanks, and hoses. The theater's offices were on the second floor, directly under the balcony, and were accessed from 41st Street. During the 1959 renovation, Rose added a visitors' lounge for performers, and he replaced the roof and water tanks.

== History ==
=== Development and early years ===
The Nederlander Theatre was constructed in 1920 as a carpenter's shop; plans filed with the New York City government called for a "3 sty [non-fireproof] brick Carpenter's shop and storage, club rooms, shower, [apartments] and tennis court". It is one of a few Broadway theaters not constructed specifically to host Broadway shows. In 1921, Walter C. Jordan acquired the building and spent $950,000 to convert it into a theater. The stage house, mezzanine, proscenium, fire escape, and other theatrical equipment was built at a cost of $175,000. Work was nearly completed by May 1921. The venue was originally supposed to be known as the Times Square Theatre, but this name was already being used by another structure at 217 West 42nd Street. As such, Jordan renamed the structure the National Theatre at the end of July 1921, shortly after booking Swords (Sidney Howard's first play) as the theater's first production. The Shubert brothers were hired as the theater's managers.

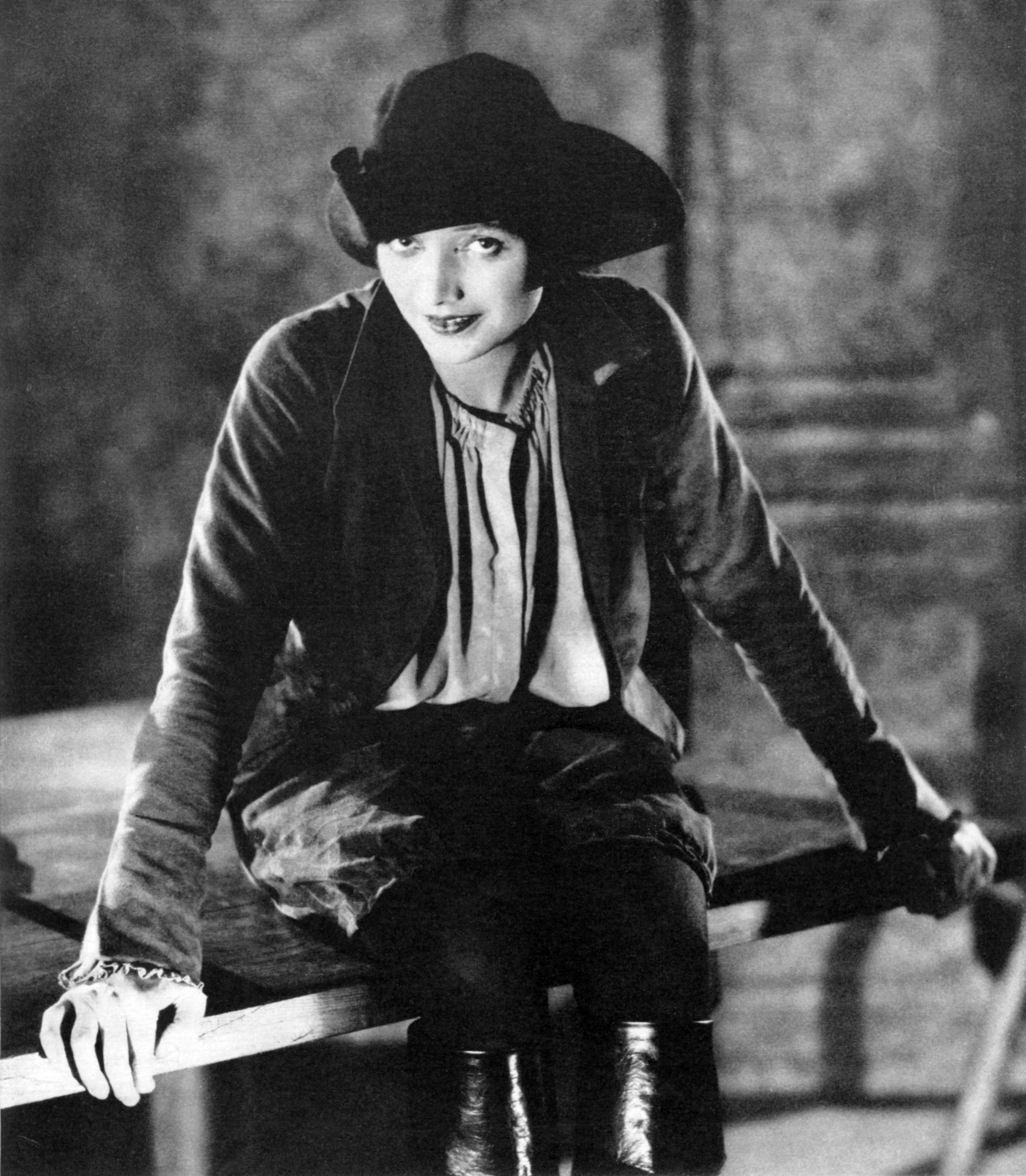
Katharine Cornell as Mary Fitton in the Broadway production of Clemence Dane's play Will Shakespeare at the National Theatre

The theater opened on September 2, 1921, with Swords. John Willard's melodrama The Cat and the Canary, which opened at the National in February 1922, was a major critical success and ran for three months. Walter Hampden leased the National for a year beginning in 1923, paying $1 million, which at the time was a record for a Broadway theater. Hampden presented a revival of the play Cyrano de Bergerac, which was a success, lasting for 250 performances. The theater building was less successful, having gone into receivership in November 1923 after Jordan failed to make payments on a mortgage. When his lease expired, Hampden chose to instead operate his own theater.

The National then hosted the melodrama Silence in 1924, with H. B. Warner, and the farce The Bride Retires in 1925, with Lila Lee. Later in 1925, the theater staged The Gorilla, which transferred from the Selwyn, as well as a revival of Hamlet. During 1926, the National hosted live performances by magician Harry Houdini; the play The Half-Caste, starring Fredric March; and George M. Cohan's adaptation of the play Yellow. Jordan, who continued to own the theater, was charged with tax fraud in late 1926 after failing to pay the theater's property taxes.

=== Shubert management ===
==== 1920s and 1930s ====
In February 1927, the Shubert brothers bought the National Theatre from the Sanjor Corporation, which had owned the theater for eight years. Later that year, Willard staged a short-lived play, Fog, at the theater. This was followed in September 1927 by Bayard Veiller's melodrama The Trial of Mary Dugan, which ran at the National for nearly a year before relocating. Subsequently, the Martin Flavin play The Criminal Code opened at the National in 1929 and lasted for 174 performances. A troupe led by Chinese actor Mei Lanfang briefly performed at the theater in early 1930, followed later that year by the play Grand Hotel (based on Vicki Baum's book Grand Hotel), which ran for 459 performances.

At the onset of the Great Depression, many Broadway theaters were impacted by declining attendance, and the theater largely hosted flops in 1932 and 1933. Alfred E. Aarons and Harry J. Sommers leased the National for a year beginning in August 1933, and they renovated the National's auditorium the next month. Meanwhile, the Dry Dock Savings Bank took over the theater that September as a result of a foreclosure auction. By then, the National was in danger of being demolished because of a sharp increase in real-estate values. The theater hosted Sean O'Casey's play Within the Gates in 1934. Subsequently, Guthrie McClintic's production of the drama Ethan Frome was presented there in January 1936, as well as Noël Coward's anthology of plays Tonight at 8:30 that November. The Mercury Theatre company, led by John Houseman and Orson Welles, performed revivals of the plays Julius Caesar and The Shoemaker's Holiday at the National in 1937 and 1938. The Lillian Hellman drama The Little Foxes, starring Tallulah Bankhead, then opened in February 1939 and lasted for 410 performances.

==== 1940s and 1950s ====
The Emlyn Williams play The Corn Is Green opened at the National in 1940, starring Ethel Barrymore for more than a year. Margaret Webster's staging of Macbeth then opened in late 1941. The Patriots by Sidney Kingsley opened at the National in 1943; it was followed later the same year by Lerner and Loewe's first Broadway musical, What's Up?, which was a flop. A revival of Anton Chekhov's play The Cherry Orchard was hosted at the National in 1944, with Joseph Schildkraut and Eva Le Gallienne, and Barrymore appeared later that year in the play Embezzled Heaven. During the mid-1940s, the National hosted several productions with over one hundred performances each. These included Lerner and Loewe's musical The Day Before Spring in 1945; the revue Call Me Mister in 1946; and the tragedy Medea with Judith Anderson in 1947. The next several shows were relatively short-lived, including an adaptation of Fyodor Dostoevsky's novel Crime and Punishment in 1947, as well as revivals of Tonight at 8:30 and Macbeth in 1948.

The National's next hit was Charles Gaynor's revue Lend an Ear in late 1948. This was followed the next year by Clifford Odets's The Big Knife, as well as a revival of Caesar and Cleopatra with Cedric Hardwicke and Lilli Palmer. In 1950, the theater featured live performances by Les Ballets de Paris and a revival of King Lear with Louis Calhern. The musical Courtin' Time, followed by a revival of The Constant Wife with Brian Aherne, Katharine Cornell, and Grace George, arrived at the theater the following year. Tennessee Williams's play Camino Real was staged at the National in early 1953, and the comedy of manners Sabrina Fair opened later the same year. The National hosted the play Inherit the Wind starting in 1955. With 806 performances, Inherit the Wind was the theater's most successful non-musical to date, as well as its longest-lasting production for several decades.

By the 1950s, the Shubert Organization operated nearly half of all legitimate theaters in New York City, prompting the U.S. federal government to file an antitrust suit against the Shubert family. As part of a settlement made in February 1956, the Shuberts had to sell off some of their theaters. In particular, the Shuberts had to sell the National Theatre within one year of the ruling, and they had to sell three other theaters (Note: The Shuberts had to pick from the Adelphi, Ambassador, Belasco, Longacre, Maxine Elliott, or Ritz theaters, selling two of the six theaters. In addition, the Shuberts had to sell the St. James Theatre, but that was under a more lax contract that allowed the family to lease out the St. James or the Imperial Theatre if they could not find a buyer.) within two years. That September, the Shuberts sold the National to Harry Fromkes for an estimated $900,000; at the time, Inherit the Wind was still being staged at the theater. Fromkes died after a fall from his apartment in February 1958, prompting the closure of the play Winesburg, Ohio, which was being performed there at the time. Fromkes's firm defaulted on its mortgage after his death, and the New York Supreme Court appointed a receiver to manage the theater that March. The receiver booked the Harry Kurnitz play Once More, with Feeling!, which opened in late 1958 and ran for 263 performances.

=== Rose management ===
Theatrical producer Billy Rose bought the National at a foreclosure auction in June 1958 for $849,500. At the time, Rose worked for William Zeckendorf's real-estate company Webb and Knapp; this prompted Zeckendorf to sue Rose for ownership of the theater. Rose spent $500,000 to renovate the theater, hiring Oliver Messel to redecorate the auditorium in a red, gold, and white color scheme. The venue was renamed the Billy Rose Theatre and reopened on October 18, 1959, with the play Heartbreak House, which had 112 performances. The next year, the theater hosted Dear Liar, which was notable as Katharine Cornell's last Broadway appearance, as well as a drama based on John Hersey's novel The Wall. The Billy Rose's next hit was Edward Albee's play Who's Afraid of Virginia Woolf?, which opened in 1962 and ran for 660 performances over the next two years.

Throughout the 1960s, the theater was often empty for extended periods because of a lack of productions. Albee's play Tiny Alice, featuring John Gielgud and Irene Worth, opened at the theater at the end of 1964, but it was not successful. The theater hosted a variety of repertory productions in the late 1960s. These included Yiddish theater performances by the Jewish State Theater of Poland and performances by the Paul Taylor Dance Company in 1967. The Playwrights Repertory Theatre performed several plays by Albee and Samuel Beckett at the theater in 1968, and the Minnesota Dance Theatre performed two plays there later that year. Following a performance by the Alvin Ailey American Dance Theater in early 1969, the revival of Noel Coward's Private Lives was presented later the same year.

The Billy Rose hosted two notable shows in 1971: the Royal Shakespeare Company's version of Shakespeare's A Midsummer Night's Dream, as well as Harold Pinter's drama Old Times. The City Center Acting Company performed four plays at the Billy Rose in late 1973 and early 1974, marking the company's first Broadway appearance. This was followed in 1974 by Tom Stoppard's play Jumpers, which had 48 performances before closing. The theater's backstage area was damaged by a storm later the same year and was not repaired; as a result, at least two productions were unable to lease the theater in 1975. Several theatrical personalities alleged that the Billy Rose Foundation (which had acquired the theater after Rose died), had allowed the structure to deteriorate. In response, foundation officials said that operating the theater was not its main priority. The Taylor Dance Company returned to the Billy Rose in 1976. The theater's first legitimate show in three years, Gus Weill's The November People, closed after a single performance in January 1978.

=== Nederlander management ===
==== Late 1970s and 1980s ====
Two theatrical operators, the Nederlander Organization and the Cooney-Marsh Organization (the latter of which was a partnership between producer Ray Cooney and real-estate developer Laurie Marsh), purchased the venue in December 1978. The venue was immediately renamed the Trafalgar Theatre, a reference to the new owners' British backgrounds; the owners hoped that the new name would evoke Trafalgar Square in London or the Battle of Trafalgar. James M. Nederlander of the Nederlander Organization said: "We want to put big English hits in the theater". The Trafalgar hosted two productions under its new name: Whose Life Is It Anyway? in 1979 and Betrayal in 1980. James M. Nederlander renamed the theater again in 1980 in honor of his father, American theater impresario David T. Nederlander, who had died thirteen years prior. The first show at the renamed Nederlander Theatre would have been the musical One Night Stand, which closed during previews in October 1980.

Lena Horne performed her solo show Lena Horne: The Lady and Her Music at the theater starting in May 1981; the show lasted for more than a year. In general, the Nederlander Theatre had difficulty securing bookings during the 1980s. The next several productions had relatively short runs, including one show, Teaneck Tanzi: The Venus Flytrap, which closed on its opening day in 1983. The theater's productions in the mid-1980s included 84 Charing Cross Road, Amen Corner, Strange Interlude and Raggedy Ann, as well as a live show taped by Robert Klein in June 1986. In addition, Jerry Weintraub purchased a stake in the operation of the Nederlander Theatre in 1984.

The New York City Landmarks Preservation Commission (LPC) had started considering protecting the Nederlander as a landmark in 1982, with discussions continuing over the next several years. While the LPC commenced a wide-ranging effort to grant landmark status to Broadway theaters in 1987, the Nederlander was among the few theaters for which the LPC denied either exterior or interior landmark status. (Note: Only the Broadway, Nederlander, and Ritz theaters were denied both interior and exterior landmark status. Several other theaters had either their exterior or interior landmark status rejected, but not both. Hearings for several theaters on 42nd Street were deferred to 2016, when they were rejected.) David Wilkerson, founding pastor of the Times Square Church, leased the theater in January 1988, a month after the play Sherlock's Last Case had closed. The theater quickly became overcrowded during church services; by 1989, the 1,150-seat Nederlander Theatre was at standing-room only capacity five days a week. This prompted the Nederlanders to lease the Mark Hellinger Theatre to the Times Square Church in February 1989; the Times Square Church moved to the Hellinger the next month. The Nederlander Theatre's next legitimate show, the musical Dangerous Games, lasted four performances.

==== 1990s and 2000s ====
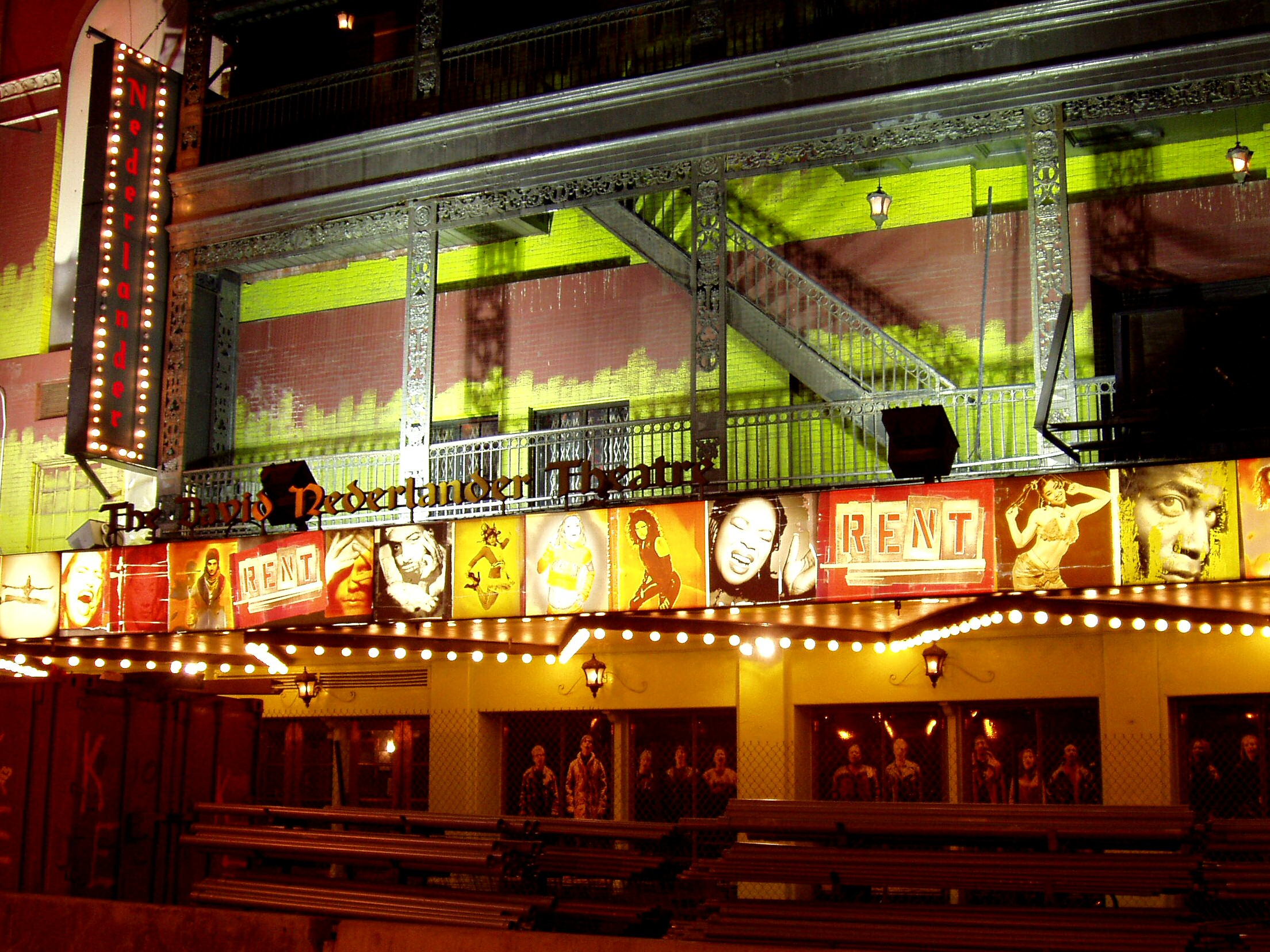
Seen in 2004 during the production of Rent

The Shuberts, the Nederlanders, and Jujamcyn formed the Broadway Alliance in June 1990, wherein each company set aside one of its theaters to present dramas and comedies at reduced ticket prices. The program covered the Belasco, Nederlander, and Walter Kerr theaters. The Broadway Alliance's first show at the Nederlander Theatre was the play Our Country's Good, which lasted from April to June 1991. More than one year elapsed before the Nederlander hosted its next production, the one-man show Solitary Confinement with Stacy Keach, which ran for two weeks in November 1992. The theater was still difficult to rent and did not host any Broadway shows for over three years; it cost around $250,000 a year to maintain, regardless of whether it was vacant. The Nederlander hosted concerts by Aretha Franklin in April 1993 and by Jackson Browne that November. The Nederlander Organization unsuccessfully tried to move Cy Coleman's musical The Life there in 1994, but the theater instead hosted auditions for the musical Busker Alley. The next year, the Nederlander hosted another audition, this time for the musical The Capeman.

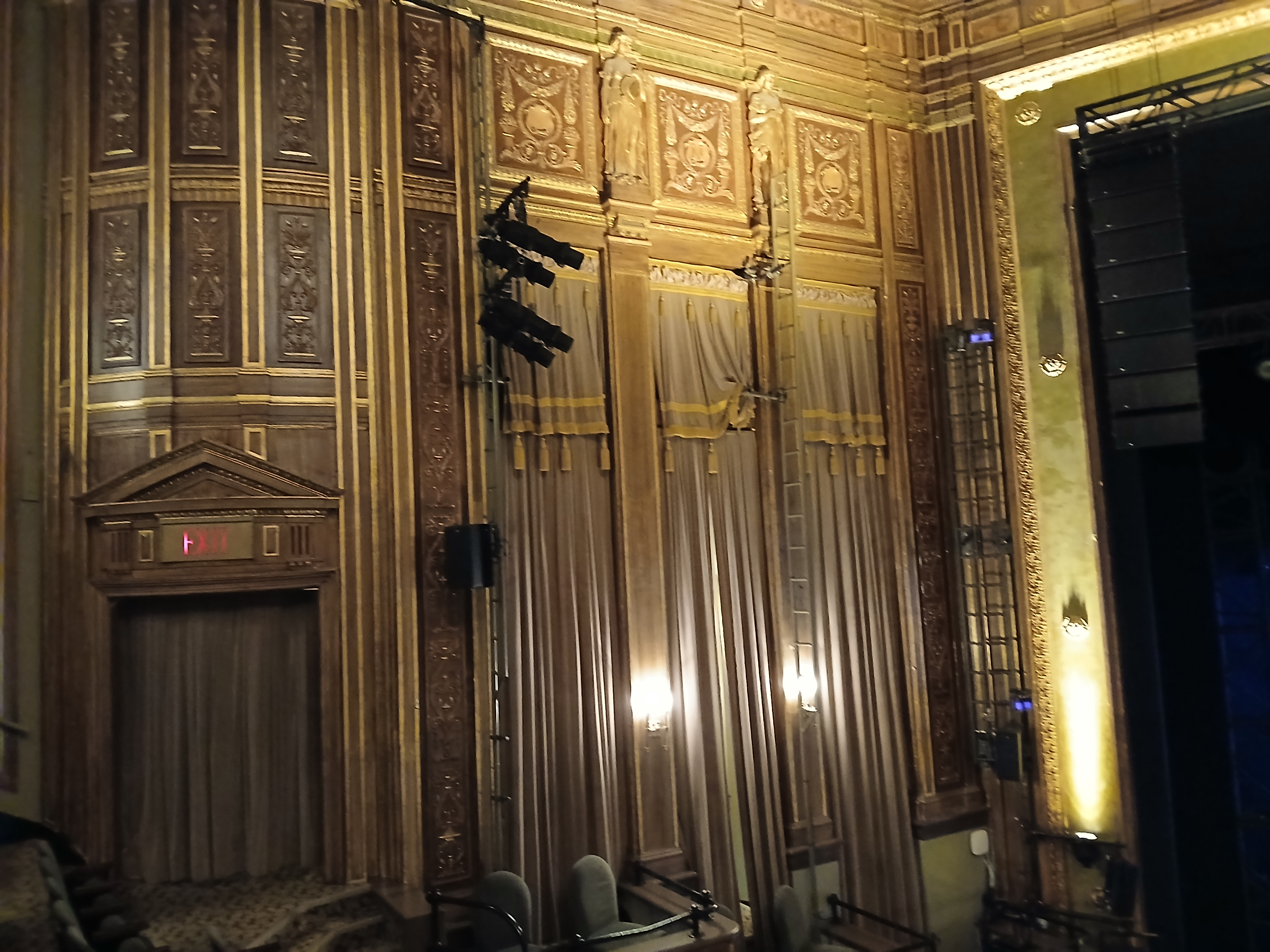
Left hand side of the auditorium

Jonathan Larson's Pulitzer Prize-winning musical Rent was booked at the Nederlander in early 1996; the musical's producers had selected the Nederlander Theatre specifically because of its dilapidated surroundings, which reflected the show's setting. The theater's facade and interior were remodeled to resemble a lower Manhattan nightclub. Rent premiered in April 1996 and quickly became popular. In contrast to many Broadway productions (in which tickets for seats at the rear of the theater were generally the cheapest), Rent's producers reserved the first two rows for the cheapest tickets. This prompted fans to sleep outside the theater to wait for these tickets. The opening of Rent, as well as the renovation of the nearby New Amsterdam Theatre, contributed to the revitalization of the surrounding block of 41st Street. Rent ultimately ran for 5,140 performances through 2008, becoming the theater's longest-running production and, at the time of closing, the seventh-longest-running Broadway show of all time.

After Rent closed, the Nederlander was refurbished to accommodate its next show. Workers expanded the restrooms and restored the original design motifs (which had been largely removed during the 1961 renovation). A revival of Guys and Dolls, starring Oliver Platt and Lauren Graham, opened in March 2009; the show played 113 performances before closing that June. The Neil Simon plays Brighton Beach Memoirs and Broadway Bound were planned to be performed at the theater in late 2009, with alternating performances of each play. Due to poor ticket sales for Brighton Beach Memoirs, the show closed on November 1, 2009, one week after its opening. Simon also canceled the planned production of Broadway Bound, blaming the theater's location for the rapid closure of Brighton Beach Memoirs.

==== 2000s to present ====
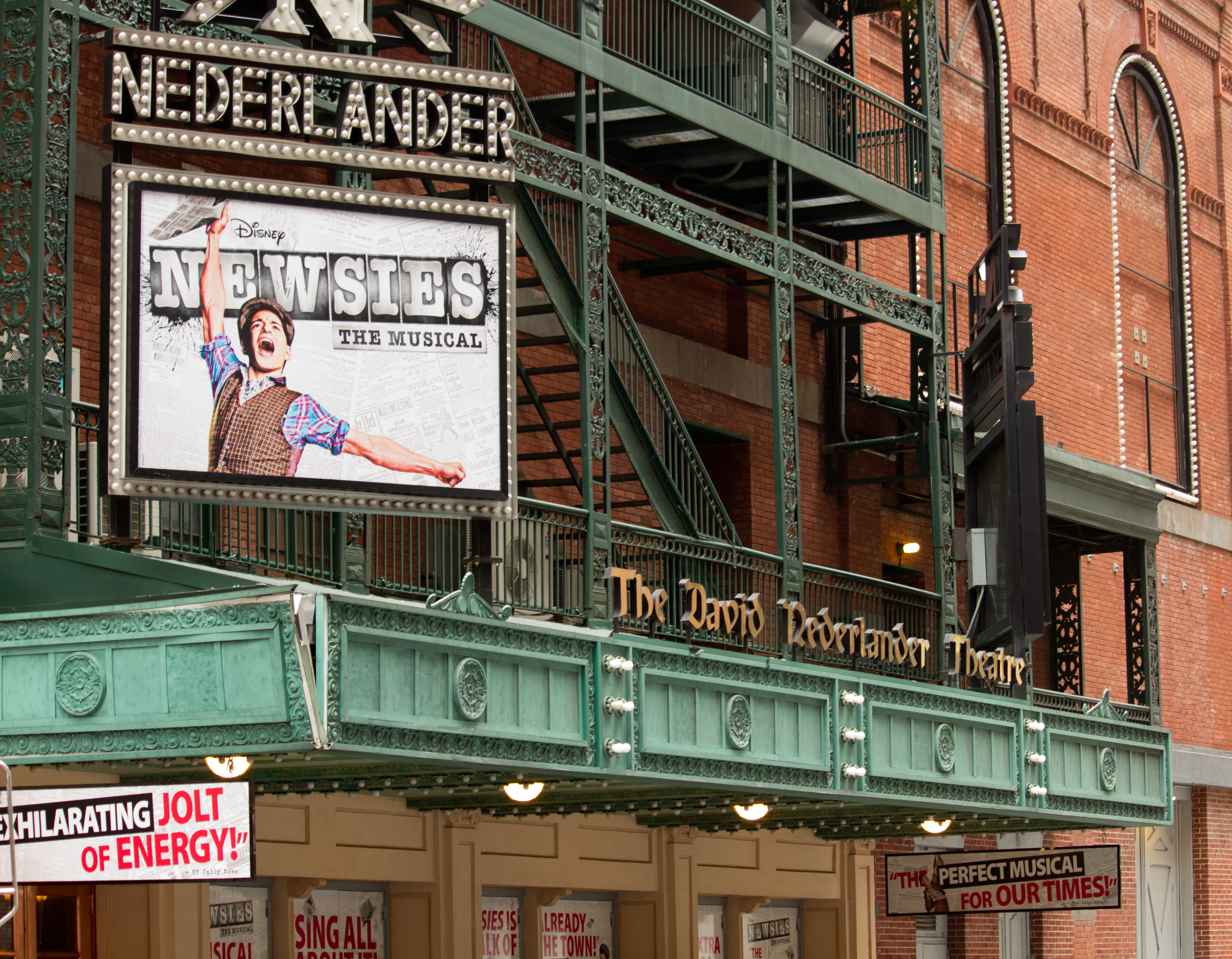
Detail of marquee and fire escape during the run of the musical Newsies

The musical Million Dollar Quartet made its Broadway debut at the theater in April 2010, running for 489 performances before moving off-Broadway in June 2011. Disney's production of the musical Newsies opened in March 2012; the show's run was extended because of its popularity, and Newsies ultimately lasted until August 2014. As part of a settlement with the United States Department of Justice in 2014, the Nederlanders agreed to improve disabled access at their nine Broadway theaters, including the Nederlander Theatre. Love Letters was originally scheduled to run at the Nederlander after Newsies closed. Instead, the musical Honeymoon in Vegas opened at the theater in January 2015, followed by Amazing Grace that July. The Nederlander hosted two short-lived shows in 2016. The musical Disaster! lasted from March to May 2016, while a revival of Motown: The Musical opened that July and ran for less than a month.

The musical War Paint ran at the Nederlander from April to November 2017, followed by Pretty Woman: The Musical from August 2018 to August 2019. The Nederlander then hosted two live appearances in late 2019: Kristin Chenoweth's For The Girls in November and Harry Connick Jr.'s A Celebration of Cole Porter the following month. The Lehman Trilogy was planned to open at the Nederlander in March 2020. The show was in previews when all Broadway theaters temporarily closed on March 12, 2020, due to the COVID-19 pandemic. The Nederlander reopened on September 25, 2021, with previews of The Lehman Trilogy, which ran from October 2021 to January 2022. The musical Mr. Saturday Night then ran from April to September 2022, and it was followed by Jefferson Mays's solo production of A Christmas Carol at the end of the year. The musical comedy Shucked opened at the Nederlander in April 2023, running for nine months. It was followed in March 2024 by the musical The Who's Tommy, which ran for four months. The next show to be staged at the Nederlander, the musical Redwood, opened in February 2025 and closed three months later. This was followed in August 2025 by a limited engagement of Jeff Ross's comedy show Take A Banana for the Ride and in December by a twelve-week run of the comedy All Out: Comedy About Ambition. Schmigadoon! opened at the Nederlander for a limited run lasting from April 2026 through January 2027.

== Notable productions ==
Productions are listed by the year of their first performance.

=== National Theatre ===
Notable productions at the theater
Opening year	Name	Refs.
1921	Trilby	
1922	The Cat and the Canary	
1923	Cyrano de Bergerac	
1925	The Gorilla	
1925	Hamlet	
1925	The Monkey Talks	
1927	The Trial of Mary Dugan	
1929	The Criminal Code	
1930	Grand Hotel	
1935	Seven Keys to Baldpate	
1936	Ethan Frome	
1936	The County Chairman	
1936	Tonight at 8:30	
1937	Red Harvest	
1937	Brother Rat	
1938	Julius Caesar	
1938	The Shoemaker's Holiday	
1939	The Little Foxes	
1940	Journey to Jerusalem	
1940	The Corn Is Green	
1941	Macbeth	
1942	Billy the Kid	
1943	The Patriots	
1943	What's Up?	
1944	The Cherry Orchard	
1945	The Assassin	
1945	The Day Before Spring	
1946	Call Me Mister	
1947	Anna Lucasta	
1947	Medea	
1947	Crime and Punishment	
1948	Tonight at 8:30	
1948	Macbeth	
1948	Lend an Ear	
1949	The Big Knife	
1949	Caesar and Cleopatra	
1950	King Lear	
1951	Courtin' Time	
1951	The Constant Wife	
1952	Candida	
1953	The Bat	
1953	Camino Real	
1953	Sabrina Fair	
1955	Inherit the Wind	
1957	The Tunnel of Love	
1958	Winesburg, Ohio	
1958	Once More, with Feeling!	

=== Billy Rose Theatre ===
Notable productions at the theater
Opening year	Name	Refs.
1959	Heartbreak House	
1960	Dear Liar	
1962	A Family Affair	
1962	Who's Afraid of Virginia Woolf?	
1964	Tiny Alice	
1965	The Right Honourable Gentleman	
1966	Threepenny Opera	
1966	The Rose Tattoo	
1967	Mirele Efros	
1967	Mother Courage and Her Children	
1968	Here's Where I Belong	
1968	Soldiers	
1968	Box & Quotations from Chairman Mao Tse-tung	(Note: These were performed in repertory.)
1968	The Death of Bessie Smith & The American Dream	
1968	Krapp's Last Tape & The Zoo Story	
1968	Happy Days	
1968	The Resistible Rise of Arturo Ui	
1969	Private Lives	
1971	A Midsummer Night's Dream	
1971	Old Times	
1972	The Country Girl	
1972	Purlie	
1973	The Three Sisters	
1973	The Beggar's Opera	
1973	Measure for Measure	
1973	Scapin	
1974	Jumpers	

=== Trafalgar Theatre/Nederlander Theatre ===
Notable productions at the theater
Opening year	Name	Refs.
1979	Whose Life Is It Anyway?	
1980	Betrayal	
1980	One Night Stand	(Note: One Night Stand never officially opened at the Nederlander Theatre; it only played previews.)
1981	Lena Horne: The Lady and Her Music	
1982	84 Charing Cross Road	
1983	Teaneck Tanzi: The Venus Flytrap	
1983	Amen Corner	
1985	Strange Interlude	
1986	Robert Klein on Broadway	
1986	Raggedy Ann	
1991	Our Country's Good	
1996	Rent	
2009	Guys and Dolls	
2009	Brighton Beach Memoirs	
2010	Million Dollar Quartet	
2012	Newsies	
2015	Honeymoon in Vegas	
2015	Amazing Grace	
2016	Disaster!	
2016	Motown: The Musical	
2017	War Paint	
2018	Pretty Woman: The Musical	
2019	Kristin Chenoweth: For The Girls	
2019	Harry Connick, Jr.: A Celebration of Cole Porter	
2021	The Lehman Trilogy	
2022	Mr. Saturday Night	
2022	A Christmas Carol	
2023	Shucked	
2024	The Who's Tommy	
2025	Redwood	
2025	Jeff Ross: Take A Banana for the Ride	
2025	All Out: Comedy About Ambition	
2026	Schmigadoon!	

== Box office record ==
Rent set the Nederlander Theatre's box-office record for the week ending November 29, 2005, when it grossed $744,496 while playing to 97 percent capacity. Newsies achieved the box office record for the Nederlander Theatre in 2012, playing to 101 percent capacity and grossed $1,024,516.60 for eight performances the week ending April 15, 2012. This gross was surpassed by War Paint the week ending April 23, 2017, when that show grossed $1,042,449. The current gross record was set by Pretty Woman: The Musical, which grossed $1,266,873 over eight performances for the week ending December 9, 2018.

== See also ==
- James M. Nederlander Theatre – Nederlander Organization theater in Chicago
- List of Broadway theaters
