= You Belong to Me (1934 film) =

1934 film by Alfred L. Werker

- Directed by: Alfred L. Werker
- Screenplay by: Elizabeth Alexander; Walter DeLeon; Grover Jones; William Slavens McNutt
- Produced by: Louis D. Lighton
- Starring: Lee Tracy; Helen Mack; Helen Morgan; David Holt; Arthur Pierson; Lynne Overman; Dean Jagger
- Cinematography: Leo Tover
- Music by: Milan Roder; Heinz Roemheld
- Production company: Paramount Pictures
- Distributed by: Paramount Pictures
- Release date: September 14, 1934
- Running time: 67 minutes
- Country: United States
- Language: English

You Belong to Me is a 1934 American drama film directed by Alfred L. Werker and written by Elizabeth Alexander, Walter DeLeon, Grover Jones and William Slavens McNutt. The film stars Lee Tracy, Helen Mack, Helen Morgan, David Holt, Arthur Pierson, Lynne Overman and Dean Jagger. It was released on September 14, 1934, by Paramount Pictures.

== Cast ==
- Lee Tracy as Bud Hannigan
- Helen Mack as Florette Faxon
- Helen Morgan as Bonnie Kay
- David Holt as Jimmy Faxon
- Arthur Pierson as Hap Stanley
- Lynne Overman as Brown
- Dean Jagger as Military School Instructor
- Edwin Stanley as Major Hurley
- Irene Ware as Lila Lacey
- Lou Cass as Joe Mandel
- Max Mack as Jack Mandel
- Mary Owen as Maizie Kelly
- Neal Dodd as Minister at Funeral
- Irving Bacon as Stage Manager

== Reception ==
In a contemporary review for The New York Times, critic Andre Sennwald wrote: "'You Belong to Me,' after a beginning which promises a fresh approach to these dramatic riches, collapses into tedium and the clumsy pursuit of tears."
