= No One Man =

1932 film

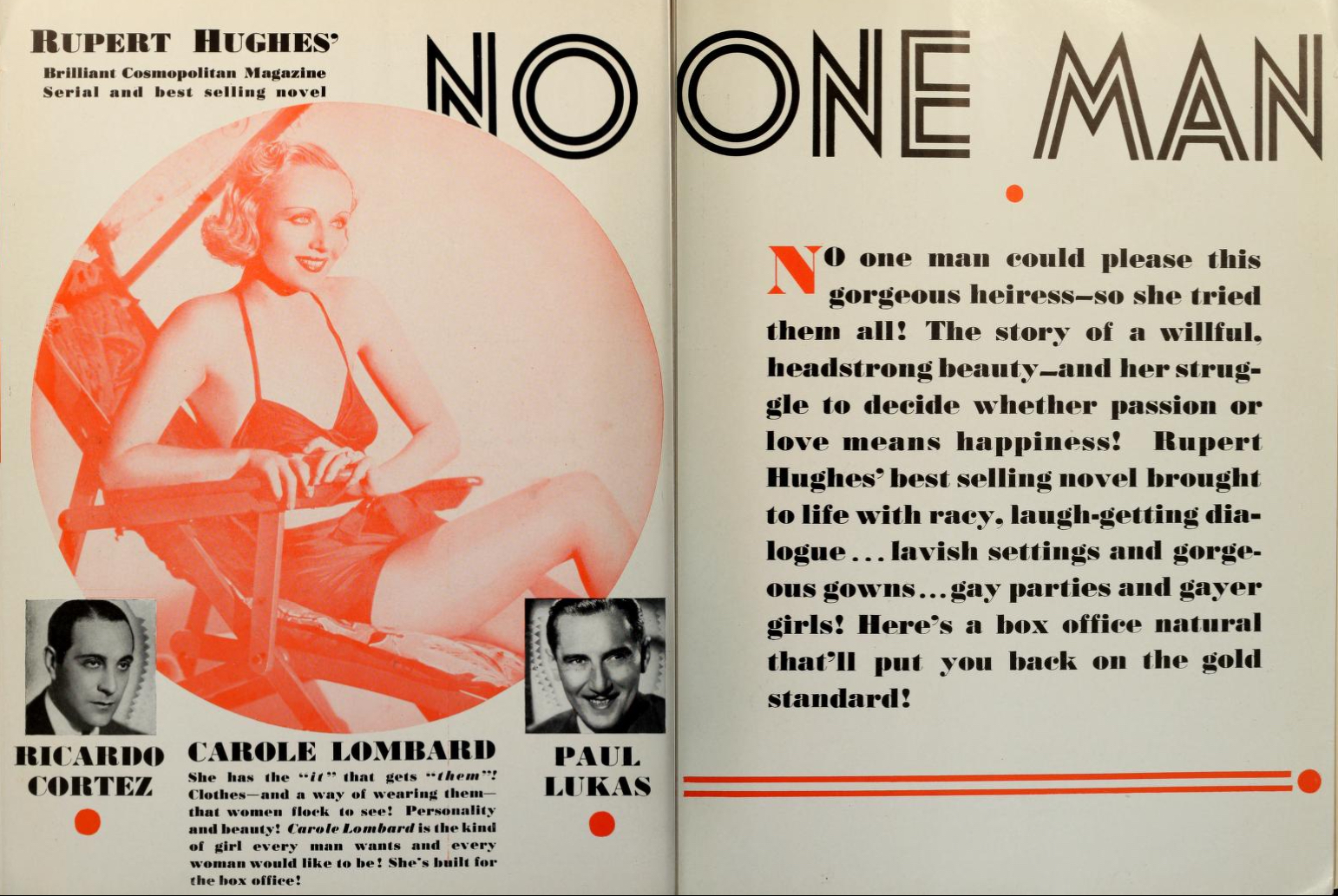
- Directed by: Lloyd Corrigan
- Written by: Sidney Buchman; Percy Heath (adaptation)
- Starring: Carole Lombard; Ricardo Cortez; Paul Lukas
- Cinematography: Charles Lang
- Distributed by: Paramount Pictures
- Release date: January 30, 1932
- Running time: 73 minutes
- Country: United States
- Language: English

No One Man is a 1932 American pre-Code drama film starring Carole Lombard and Ricardo Cortez, and directed by Lloyd Corrigan. It is based on a novel by Rupert Hughes.

== Plot ==
Penelope Newbold is a wealthy divorcée looking to remarry. She falls for her physician, Dr. Karl Bemis, but ends up marrying Bill Hanaway. He then has an affair with another woman. After Bill dies of a heart attack, Penelope and Dr. Bemis come together.

== Cast ==
- Carole Lombard : Penelope Newbold
- Ricardo Cortez : Bill Hanaway
- Paul Lukas : Dr. Karl Bemis
- Juliette Compton : Sue Folsom
- George Barbier : Alfred Newbold
- Virginia Hammond : Mrs. Newbold
- Arthur Pierson : Stanley McIlvaine

== Critical reception ==
The New York Times wrote that the film dealt with "The infidelities of the upper classes", but as presented, they were "not intelligent, or dramatic or even amusing."

Variety described the film as "unimportant screen material" and commented that Carole Lombard had two handicaps to overcome : "One is the character she plays and the other is the camera. The lens has been none too kind to her here. Gorgeous in 'stills' the reproduction on the screen for her is such as to cause audible unfavourable comment from women in the audience." Variety listed the film's main assets as "the gown display, the sumptuous surroundings and Paul Lukas."

Harrison's Reports gave a negative review and wrote, "A demoralizing sex picture with hardly any human interest. The characters arouse no sympathy ... The story is inane, useless and at times even ridiculous. As a matter of fact it is just so much filthy trash."

International Photographer gave the film a positive, if not overly enthusiastic review, calling "gentlemanly and ladylike" and "smart society stuff."

== See also ==
- The House That Shadows Built (1931), a Paramount promotional film with excerpts from No One Man
