= Patricia Marshall =

American actress and singer (1924–2018)

- Patricia Marshall in 1946
- Born: Marriam Patricia Murphy; January 13, 1924; Minneapolis, Minnesota, US
- Died: December 11, 2018 (aged 94); Westwood, California, US
- Other name: Patricia Gelbart
- Occupations: Actress, singer
- Spouses: Daniel Markowitz (m. 1947; div. 1956) Larry Gelbart (m. 1956; died 2009)
- Children: 3

Patricia Marshall (January 13, 1924 – December 11, 2018) was an American actress and singer. Marshall performed in Broadway plays, two feature films, and a television episode. She won an award in 1946 for one of her Broadway performances.

== Biography and career ==
Marshall was born in Minneapolis, Minnesota, on January 13, 1924, as Marriam Patricia Murphy. She attended West High School in Minneapolis. She acted in the Broadway plays You'll See Stars (1942), What's Up? (1943), Hats Off to Ice (1944), The Day Before Spring (1945), The Pajama Game (1954), and Mr. Wonderful (1956). In 1947, she had a role in the film Good News that was originally supposed to go to Gloria DeHaven. Due to a disagreement between DeHaven and the film's producer over the script, DeHaven abandoned her role and was suspended, and Marshall was given the role. Marshall later sang on Steve Allen's The Tonight Show.

She was married to Daniel Markowitz from 1947 until they divorced in 1956. They had two sons (Gary Markowitz) and a daughter; their daughter died of cancer in 1998. In 1956, she married writer and producer Larry Gelbart. She did not appear in another role until 1975 with her small role in the film The Prisoner of Second Avenue. In the same year, Marshall had a role as a nurse playing poker in an episode of M*A*S*H, which her husband created. She was married to Gelbart until he died in 2009 from cancer, leaving behind a son and daughter from his marriage to Patricia Marshall.

== Reception ==
In 1946, Marshall won a Theatre World Award for her role in the Broadway play The Day Before Spring. A 1948 review of Good News in the Petaluma Argus-Courier stated, "The chance to see Patricia Marshall, star of the Broadway hit Day Before Spring, is good news for screen-goers".

== Death ==
Marshall died at the age of 94 on December 11, 2018, at her residence in Westwood, Los Angeles in the presence of her family.

== Filmography ==
| Year | Title | Role | Notes |
|---|---|---|---|
| 1947 | Good News | Pat McClellan | |
| 1956 | The Lieutenant Wore Skirts | Chorus girl | |
| 1956 | The Solid Gold Cadillac | | Uncredited |
| 1975 | The Prisoner of Second Avenue | Woman Upstairs | (final film role) |
