= The Little Prince (1974 film) =

1974 film by Stanley Donen

- Directed by: Stanley Donen
- Screenplay by: Alan Jay Lerner
- Based on: The Little Prince by Antoine de Saint-Exupéry
- Produced by: Stanley Donen
- Starring: Richard Kiley; Bob Fosse; Steven Warner; Gene Wilder
- Cinematography: Christopher Challis
- Edited by: Peter Boita; George Hively
- Music by: Frederick Loewe (score); Alan Jay Lerner (lyrics) Angela Morley (arranged & orchestrated)
- Production company: Stanley Donen Films
- Distributed by: Paramount Pictures
- Release date: November 7, 1974
- Running time: 88 minutes
- Countries: United Kingdom; United States
- Language: English

The Little Prince is a 1974 science fantasy-musical film with screenplay and lyrics by Alan Jay Lerner, music by Frederick Loewe, arranged and orchestrated by Angela Morley. It was both directed and produced by Stanley Donen and based on the 1943 classic children-adult's novella, The Little Prince (Le Petit Prince), by the writer, poet and aviator Count Antoine de Saint-Exupéry, who disappeared near the end of the Second World War some 15 months after his fable was first published. It was nominated for Academy Awards for Best Song Score and Best Original Song.

== Background ==
The original Little Prince was first published in 1943, and is the most famous work of the French aristocrat, writer, poet and pioneering aviator Count Antoine de Saint-Exupéry (1900–1944). It is a poetic tale self-illustrated in watercolours in which a pilot stranded in the desert meets a young prince fallen to Earth from a tiny asteroid. The story is philosophical and includes societal criticism, remarking on the strangeness of the adult world.

Antoine de Saint-Exupéry wrote and illustrated The Little Prince in New York City and Asharoken, N.Y. in mid-to-late 1942 while exiled in the United States after the Fall of France, with the manuscript being completed in October. It would be first published in early 1943 in both English and French, but only in the U.S. It would later appear in his native homeland of France posthumously, after the liberation of Paris; all of Saint-Exupéry's works had been banned in Nazi-occupied France. Since first being published the novella has been adapted to various media over the decades, including audio recordings, stage, ballet, and operatic works.

The fantasy-musical film adaptation of The Little Prince was directed and produced by Stanley Donen, and stars Steven Warner in the title role, with Richard Kiley as the aviator, titled as The Pilot. Additional cast members included Bob Fosse as The Snake, Gene Wilder as The Fox, Donna McKechnie as the petulant, vain Rose, Joss Ackland as The King, and Victor Spinetti as The Historian. The film's desert sequences were shot on location in Tunisia.

The production was Lerner and Loewe's final musical. The music's creative team were dissatisfied with the film's Hollywood treatment, with Loewe refusing to visit London to supervise the arrangement and recording of the score.

== Plot ==
Based in the 1943 classic book of the same name by Antoine de Saint-Exupéry, the fable tells the story of an aviator forced to make an emergency landing in the Sahara Desert. There he is befriended by a young boy, the Little Prince, who had descended to Earth from Asteroid B-612. In the days that follow, The Pilot hears about his past and various journeys throughout the Solar System.

As he travels through space, the Little Prince encounters several strange grown-ups on different planetoids, all with a skewed or curious way of looking at life. But it is not until he finally reaches Earth, that the Little Prince learns his most important life lessons of all, mainly from The Fox, and The Snake. Before the Little Prince dies, he shares those lessons with The Pilot. Although The Pilot tries to keep the Little Prince alive, the boy disappears in the morning and The Pilot searches for him in the desert but gives up after realizing that the Little Prince never existed. Soon The Pilot is able to start his plane and flies away but hears the laughter of the Little Prince in the starry night; he believes the boy has returned to space.

== Cast ==
- Steven Warner as The Little Prince
- Richard Kiley as The Pilot
- Bob Fosse as The Snake
- Gene Wilder as The Fox
- Donna McKechnie as The Rose
- Joss Ackland as The King
- Graham Crowden as The General
- Victor Spinetti as The Historian
- Clive Revill as The Businessman

Richard Burton was actively pursued for the role of The Pilot. Burton had had a huge success on Broadway with Lerner and Loewe's musical production Camelot, but turned down the role in The Little Prince.

== Musical numbers ==
A soundtrack album was released by ABC Records. It is now available in CD format on the Decca Records label.

1. Overture – Orchestra
2. "It's a Hat/I Need Air" – Chorus/The Pilot
3. "I'm on Your Side" – The Pilot
4. "Be Happy" – The Rose
5. "You're a Child, Pt. 1" – The King
6. "You're a Child, Pt. 2" – The Businessman
7. "I Never Met a Rose" – The Pilot
8. "Why Is the Desert" – The Pilot and The Little Prince
9. "A Snake in the Grass" – The Snake
10. "Closer and Closer and Closer" – The Fox and The Little Prince
11. "Little Prince" – The Pilot
12. "Finale: Little Prince" – Chorus

== Production ==
The film was shot on location in Tunisia.

In 1973, Lerner and Loewe recorded the score at the Palm Springs Desert Museum, with Lerner on vocals and Loewe at the piano. It included "Matters of Consequence", which was cut from the film. It is one of only a few existing recordings of the duo performing together.

The film had production design by John Barry (not to be confused with composer John Barry, who later composed a musical adaptation of The Little Prince for Broadway).

== Release ==
The film opened at Radio City Music Hall in New York City on November 7, 1974 in a show including The Nativity, The Rockettes and the Will Irwin Orchestra and grossed $215,000 in its opening week.

== Legacy ==
Renowned Broadway director and choreographer Bob Fosse appears in the film as The Snake for one song, "A Snake in the Grass", during which he performs a dance sequence that he choreographed, which includes trademark Fosse elements such as hip thrusts, jazz hands, and use of hat and jacket as props, as well as a variation on the moonwalk. The accompanying scene has been speculated to have been a major influence on singer Michael Jackson's costume and choreography for performances of his 1982 hit song "Billie Jean".

== See also ==
- List of American films of 1974
