= The Day Before Spring =

- Original Broadway Playbill
- Music: Frederick Loewe
- Lyrics: Alan Jay Lerner
- Book: Alan Jay Lerner
- Productions: 1945 Broadway

The Day Before Spring is a musical with a book and lyrics by Alan Jay Lerner and music by Frederick Loewe.

== Productions ==
The 1945 touring production closed in Chicago after three days due to a crippling coal strike. The show then opened at the Shubert Theatre, Boston, Massachusetts on October 30, 1945, with the Billboard Magazine critic writing "Lerner and Loewe look like potential supermen."

The musical opened on Broadway on November 22, 1945 at the National Theatre, and closed on April 13, 1946 after 167 performances. Directed by Edward Padula and choreographed by Antony Tudor, the cast included Lucille Benson, John Archer, Bert Freed, Wayne Lamb, Irene Manning, William Johnson and Patricia Marshall.

On February 21, 1961, the Los Angeles Times reported that Arthur Freed, producer of Gigi, would produce a film version for MGM starring Debbie Reynolds, despite the play and any of its songs "having never caught on." The project never materialized.

The show was performed in July 2007 by the York Theatre Company in New York City as part of their Mufti Theatre series. The York staged concert starred Hunter Bell, Amanda Watkins, Richard Todd Adams, Edward Watts and Tia Speros. The restoration of the show was undertaken by musical supervisors Aaron Gandy, Mark York and director David Glenn Armstrong and included material that had been missing since the show closed on Broadway in 1946. A treasure trove of material was bought by the Library of Congress in 1999 which supplied some missing pieces to the score.

In 2010 the Lost Musicals project (The Lost Musicals Charitable Trust 1069268) presented The Day Before Spring at the Sadler's Wells Theatre in London. Ian Marshall Fisher, director, Chris Walker, Music Director. Cast included: Madeline Worrall, David Habin, Harry Landis, Kaisa Hammarlund, Henry Luxemburg. This, the UK premiere of the show, included songs rediscovered by scholar Dominic McHugh.

In 2019, The York Theatre Company in New York City reprised the production in their Musicals in Mufti series. The York staged concert was directed by Marc Acito and starred Madison Claire Parks, Will Reynolds, Alyse Alan Louis, Kent M. Lewis, Nicolas Dromard, Michelle Liu Coughlin, Jonathan Christopher, Ian Lowe, Jesse Manocherian, Judith Ingber, and Brittany Santos. With Music Direction by David Hancock Turner.

== Plot overview ==
The plot concerns a married woman who, at a college reunion, meets the man with whom she almost eloped ten years before. Romantically stirred by a novel he has written about her, she considers leaving her husband and reuniting with her former flame.

== Song list ==
Act I

- "The Day Before Spring" - Katherine
- The invitation - Bill
- "God's Green World"
- "You Haven't Changed at All" - Katherine and Alex
- "My Love Is a Married Man" - Christopher
- "The Day Before Spring" - Katherine and Alex
- Ballet of the book according to Alex
- Katherine receives advice - Freud, Plato, Voltaire
- Finale - Katherine and ensemble

Act II

- "Friends to the End" - Bill, Joe, Harry, Gerald, and alumni
- "A Jug of Wine" - Christopher
- The Book
- "Where's My Wife?" - Peter and ensemble
- "This is My Holiday" - Katherine
- Ballet of the book according to Gerald
- Finale - Principals and company
