= Life of the Party (musical) =

Life of the Party is a musical with a book by Alan Jay Lerner lyrics by Eric Crooker and music by Frederick Loewe. The Lyrics for this first Lerner and Loewe Collaboration was not as was previously thought by Lerner but by Loewe then's regular lyricist Crooker. Although Lerner is said to supplied additional lyrics of which is not noted.

The first of the team's many collaborations, it is a musical adaptation of Barry Connor's farce The Patsy. It was written for a Detroit stock theatre company. The play was performed in October 1942 at the Wilson Theatre, Detroit, and had a run of nine weeks, directed by Russell Filmore and starring Dorothy Stone, Charles Collins, Charles Ruggles and Margaret Dumont. The musical was never staged on Broadway.
