= Arthur Pierson (director) =

American actor and director

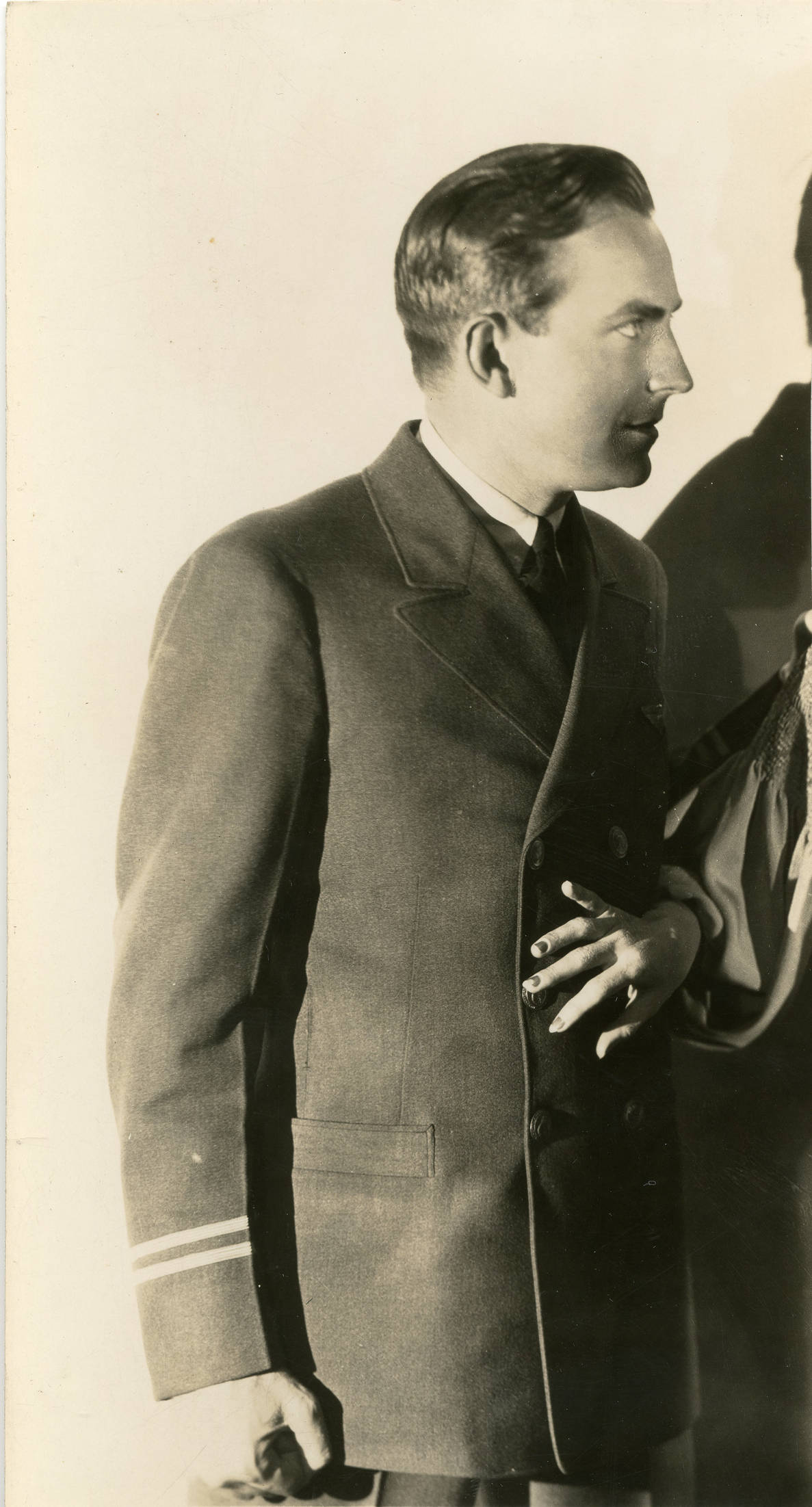
- Arthur Pierson in 1925
- Born: June 16, 1901; Oslo, Norway
- Died: January 1, 1975 (aged 73); Santa Monica, California, U.S.
- Occupation(s): Actor, director

Arthur Pierson (June 16, 1901 – January 1, 1975) was a Norwegian-born American actor and director. Born in Oslo, he was brought to the United States and raised in Seattle, Washington. He made his Broadway acting debut in 1929 in Remote Control. He continued to appear on stage throughout the 1930s, appearing in plays such as Night of January 16th (1935) and a Broadway production of Othello (1937). His last Broadway appearance was in The Unconquered in 1940.

In 1932 he took up film acting as well, appearing in Lloyd Corrigan's No One Man. He subsequently appeared in over a dozen movies, usually in minor roles. Among his best-known film roles was Capitano Lorenzo in the Laurel and Hardy comedy The Devil's Brother (1933). In 1947 he went behind the camera to direct Dangerous Years. He directed two other features, The Fighting O'Flynn (1949) and Home Town Story (1951), before turning to television as a director and producer. In his later years he was an executive at animation studio Hanna-Barbera. He died of a heart attack on January 1, 1975, in Santa Monica, California.

== Filmography ==
Year	Title	Role	Notes
1932	No One Man	Stanley McIlvaine	
1932	Tomorrow and Tomorrow	Spike	
1932	The Strange Case of Clara Deane	Lew Severen	Uncredited
1932	Bachelor's Affairs	Oliver Denton	
1932	Hat Check Girl	Felix Cornwall	Uncredited
1932	Rackety Rax	'Speed' Bennett	
1932	The Golden West	Robert Summers	
1933	Air Hostess	Dick Miller	
1933	The Devil's Brother	Lorenzo	
1933	Ann Carver's Profession	Ken Bingham	
1933	The Way to Love	M. Joe	
1933	Before Midnight	Dr. David R. Marsh	
1934	You Belong to Me	Hap Stanley	
1934	Murder in the Clouds	Jason	
1935	Sweet Surrender	Nick Harrington	
1943	Follies Girl	Sgt. Bill Perkins	(final film role)
