= Sigh No More (musical) =

Musical revue by Noël Coward

- Ritchard, Elliott, Grenfell and Payn sing "The Burchells of Battersea Rise"
- Music: Noël Coward
- Lyrics: Noël Coward
- Productions: 1945 London

Sigh No More is a musical revue consisting of twenty-two scenes and numbers composed, written and produced by Noël Coward, with additional items by Joyce Grenfell, Richard Addinsell and Norman Hackforth. The show was Coward's first post-World War II musical and starred Cyril Ritchard, his wife Madge Elliott and Joyce Grenfell. It also featured Graham Payn, Coward's longtime partner, who sang the best-known song in the show, the wistful "Matelot".

It opened at the Manchester Opera House on 11 July 1945, before transferring to London's West End, where it opened at the Piccadilly Theatre on 22 August 1945, running for 213 performances and closing on 23 February 1946. Despite its indifferent success, it contained songs that endured in Coward's later cabaret act and elsewhere.

== Musical numbers ==
Part 1

- Sigh No More – Harlequin and Singing Silphides (Payn and ladies)
- DuMaurier – Society Lady (Grenfell; music by Richard Addinsell; lyrics by Grenfell)
- The Parting of the Ways – Lenora and Michael (Elliott and Ritchard)
- Mother and Daughter – The Mother and the Daughter (Gwen Bateman and Joy O'Neill)
- I Wonder What Happened to Him? – Indian Army Officer (Ritchard)
- Music Hath Charms – Miss Lawson and others (Elliott and others; music & lyrics by Norman Hackforth)
- Never Again – The Singer and Extras (Payn and ensemble)
- That Is the End of the News – (Grenfell)
- Loch Lomond – (Gail Kendal; arrangement by Hackforth)
- Pageant – Company

Part 2

- Willy – Willy, Good Angel and Bad Angel (Tom Linden, Elliott and Ritchard)
- Wait a Bit, Joe – Payn
- Travelling Broadens the Mind – Grenfell (written by her)
- Nina (from Argentina) (parodying "Begin the Beguine") – Gigolo, Nina and Singer (Linden, Kendal and Ritchard)
- The Merry Wives of Windsor – Mrs. Macadoo, Ladies and Private Niven (Elliott, Ladies and Ritchard)
- Matelot – Payn
- Blithe Spirit Ballet – Linden and others
- The Burchells of Battersea Rise – Ritchard, Elliott, Grenfell and Payn
- Japanese spies – Elliott and Ritchard (cut from the show in tryouts; was not performed in London)
- Finale, Sigh No More – Entire Company

== Reception ==
The Times singled out for praise the songs "Nina", about a South American beauty who hates Latin American dancing and falls in love with a sailor with a wooden leg; "I Wonder What Happened to Him?", in which army officers reminisce about colleagues in India; "The Burchells of Battersea Rise", about suburban life; and "That is the End of the News". In the last, Grenfell was "the insanely cheerful schoolgirl greeting each fresh family misfortune with an ecstatic grin". The Manchester Guardian also praised Coward's song "Matelot", sung by Graham Payn; the title song, "Sigh No More", sung by Ritchard; "Old Soldiers Never Die" sung by Cliff Gordon; "Willy", in which troupes of good and bad angels strive vigorously for the direction of a small boy’s future life; and a Blithe Spirit ballet. Ivor Brown in The Observer thought that the ballet could have been dropped, but praised the rest of the show. The musical director was Mantovani, of whom The Manchester Guardian said that he and his orchestra "might be presented as the biggest and most successful 'star turn' of the whole production".
