= Shaftesbury Theatre (1888) =

Theatre in London (1888–1941)

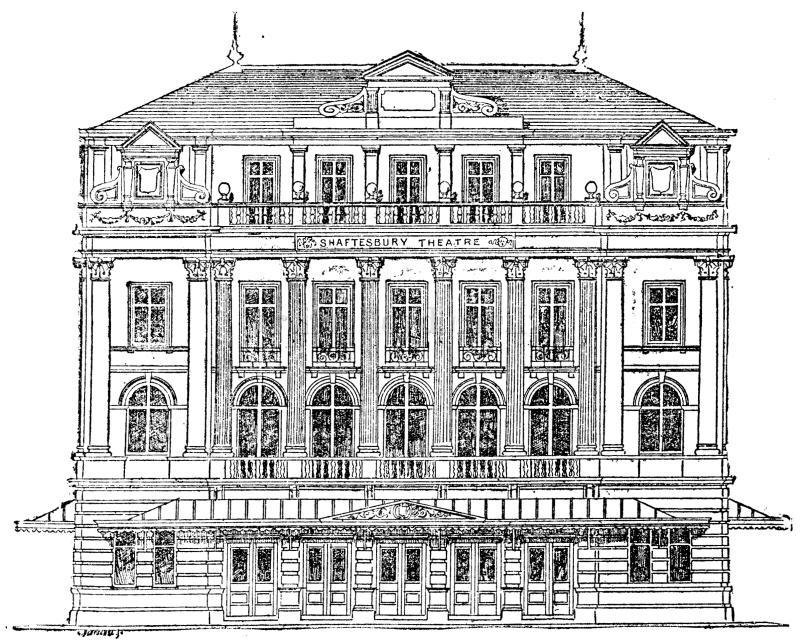
- Shaftesbury Theatre (from the Pall Mall Gazette, 1888)
- Interactive map of Shaftesbury Theatre
- Address: Shaftesbury Avenue; Westminster, London
- Coordinates: 51.5125°N 0.1301°W
- Owner: John Lancaster
- Capacity: 1,196
- Type: West End theatre
- Designation: Demolished
- Current use: Car park

Construction
- Opened: 20 October 1888
- Closed: 1941
- Rebuilt: 1888–1941
- Architect: C. J. Phipps

The Shaftesbury Theatre was a theatre in central London, England, between 1888 and 1941. It was built by John Lancaster for his wife, Ellen Wallis, a well-known Shakespearean actress. The theatre was designed by C. J. Phipps and built by Messrs. Patman and Fotheringham at a cost of £20,000 and opened with a production of As You Like It on 20 October 1888.

The theatre had a stage of 28' 6" square. The capacity was 1,196. It was located on the south side of Shaftesbury Avenue, just east of Gerrard Place.

== History ==
The theatre's first big hit was The Belle of New York produced by the prominent Broadway producer, George W. Lederer, which opened on 12 April 1898 and ran for an extremely successful 697 performances. In 1908–09 H. B. Irving became the lessee and manager of the theatre and presented a successful season of plays. Robert Courtneidge was lessee for most of the early years of the 20th century and produced mostly comic operas and Edwardian musical comedies, including Tom Jones (1907), the record-setting hit The Arcadians (1909), Oh! Oh! Delphine! (1913), The Pearl Girl and many others. In 1914 Basil Rathbone appeared at the Shaftesbury as the Dauphin in Shakespeare's Henry V.

Courtneidge's successors from 1917 to 1921 were George Grossmith Jr. and Edward Laurillard. They produced a number of shows, including Arlette by Austen Hurgon and George Arthurs (1917); Baby Bunting by Fred Thompson and Worton David (1919); and The Great Lover, by Leo Ditrichstein, Frederic Hatton and Fanny Hatton (1920).

In 1941 the theatre was so severely damaged by aerial bombardment that the lease was vacated, and in 1956 the site was appropriated by the London County Council for a proposed new fire station to replace the one next door. However it was to remain empty for over 40 years used only as a car park surrounded by advertising boards. The current Soho fire station was eventually built on the site in 1983.
