= Yes, Uncle! =

- Lolita, Bobby and Diablo
- Music: Nat D. Ayer
- Lyrics: Clifford Grey
- Book: Austen Hurgon; George Arthurs
- Productions: 1917 West End

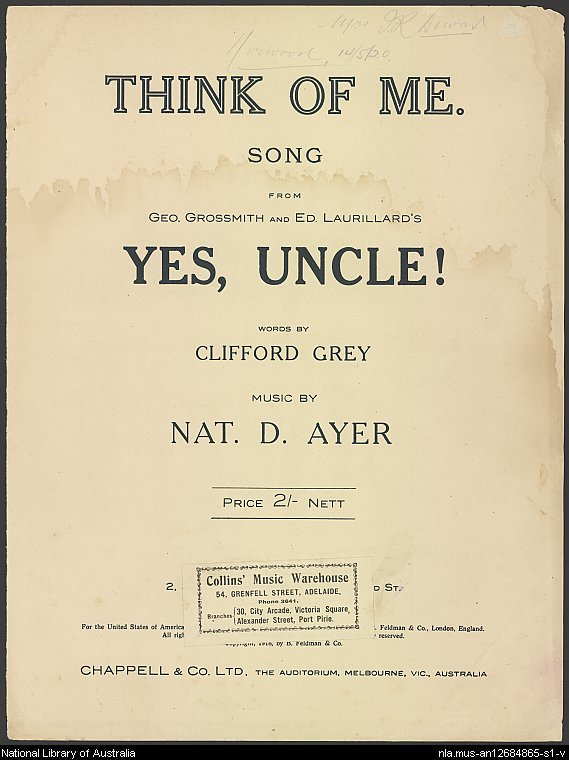
Sheet music cover

Yes, Uncle! is a musical comedy with a book by Austen Hurgon and George Arthurs, music by Nat D. Ayer and lyrics by Clifford Grey. The story is based on the farce Le truc du Brésilien by Nicolas Nancey and Paul Armont, and the musical takes its title from the catch-phrase used by Bobby Summers and Mabel Mannering, addressing Uncle Brabazon Hollybone. It was produced by George Grossmith, Jr. and Edward Laurillard and opened at the Prince of Wales Theatre in London on 16 December 1917 and ran for a very successful 626 performances. The piece starred Fred Leslie as G.B. Stark, Margaret Bannerman as Joan and Leslie Henson as Bobby Summers. Later, Madge Elliott and Cyril Ritchard starred in the musical.

Yes, Uncle! was one of a number of very successful musical hits of the London stage during World War I (the others include the revue The Bing Boys Are Here (also with music and lyrics by Ayer and Grey), the musical The Maid of the Mountains, Chu Chin Chow, a mixture of comic opera and pantomime, The Happy Day (1916), Theodore & Co (1916) and The Boy (1917). Audiences wanted light and uplifting entertainment during the war, and these shows delivered it.

== Principal characters and original cast ==
- Mabel Mannering – Julia James
- Joan – Margaret Bannerman
- Bobby Summers – Leslie Henson
- G.B. Stark – Fred Leslie
- Gustave – Victor Gouriet
- Nichette – Lily St. John
- Lolita – Alexia Bassian
- Diablo – Robert Nainby
- Uncle Brabazon Hollybone – Davy Burnaby
- Gapour – Henri Leoni

== Synopsis ==
Scene at the Four Arts Ball

In Paris, Bobby Summers and Mabel Mannering frequently address their Uncle Brab with the catchphrase, "Yes, uncle!". Bobby is trying to help his friend, the artist George Stark, to disentangle his amatory affairs, and for that purpose, Bobby is temporarily impersonating George, with Mabel pretending to be Mrs. Stark.

The couple have a quarrel about whether to attend the Four Arts Ball, and Bobby goes on his own, disguised as a French count, in which guise he successfully deceives both Mabel and an old flame, Lolita. Lolita successfully makes a play for rich Uncle Brab.
