= Winifred Barnes =

British musical comedy actress and singer (1892–1935)

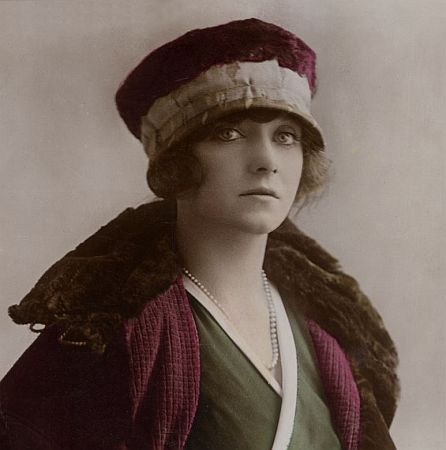
Winifred Barnes in 1916

Winifred "Betty" Barnes (18 December 1892 – 5 April 1935) was an English actress and singer known for roles in Edwardian musical comedy and operetta, creating the title role in Betty, among others. After 15 years on the stage, she retired upon her marriage in 1924.

== Early life ==
Joseph Coyne and Barnes in Arlette (1917)

Barnes was born in Brixton in south London in 1892, the youngest daughter of William Bernard Barnes (1861–1943), a bicycle maker, and his Irish-born wife, Nora née Buckley, a schoolmistress. She was educated at the Convent of Notre Dame on Clapham Common.

== Career ==
Barnes photographed by Rita Martin (c. 1914)

She made her stage début in Edwardian musical comedy with a minor role in Our Miss Gibbs at the Gaiety Theatre in London in 1909. She toured the provinces in the companies of George Edwardes, playing such roles as Marjory Joy in a revival of A Country Girl (1914) and the title role in Betty at the Prince's Theatre in Manchester (1914) and then at Daly's Theatre in London in 1915, where it ran for 391 performances. She appeared as Mary, Princess of Valaria in The Happy Day (1916) at Daly's Theatre in London, which ran for 241 performances. She was Aloney opposite Charles Hawtrey in Anthony in Wonderland by Monckton Hoffe at the Prince of Wales Theatre in 1917.

In 1917 Barnes played the title role in the operetta Arlette at the Shaftesbury Theatre in London on 6 September 1917 where it ran for 260 performances, and in 1918 she played Marlene de Launay in the operetta Soldier Boy! with music by Sigmund Romberg and Emmerich Kalman at the Apollo Theatre. In 1919 she appeared in Maggie with music by Marcel Lattès and lyrics by Adrian Ross at the Oxford Theatre in London. She played Ariel in The Tempest at the Aldwych Theatre in 1921 and Betty in the Victor Herbert musical Angel Face at the Strand Theatre in London in 1922. Her last role was Hélene in the operetta The Three Graces, with music by Franz Lehár, at the Empire Theatre in Leicester Square in early 1924.

== Retirement and death ==
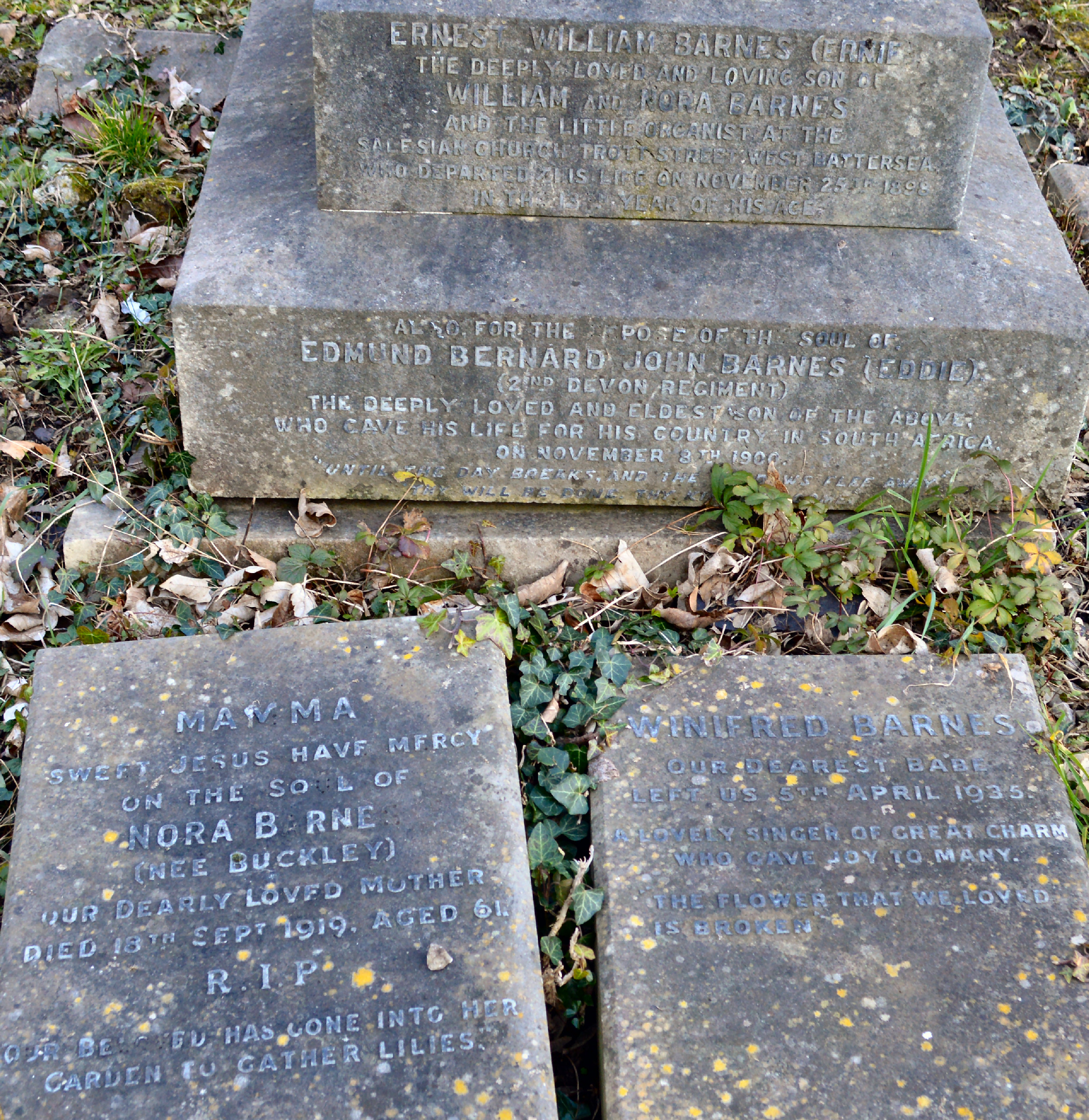
St Mary Magdalen, Mortlake.

Barnes retired from the stage after her marriage to Roy Faulkner, a barrister and tobacco merchant, at Brompton Oratory, Kensington, London, on 24 July 1924, and the couple lived in Weircombe Cottage at Holywell, Eastbourne, where she took up poultry farming.

She died suddenly at Weircombe Cottage, after a brief illness in 1935, aged 41. She is buried in the churchyard of St Mary Magdalen Church, Mortlake; the inscription reads "A lovely singer of great charm who gave joy to many. The flower that we loved is broken."

== Sources ==
- Wearing, J. P. The London Stage 1910–1919: A Calendar of Productions, Performers, and Personnel, Rowman & Littlefield (2014)
- Wearing, J. P. The London Stage 1920–1929: A Calendar of Productions, Performers, and Personnel, Rowman & Littlefield (2014)
