= Nat Ayer =

American composer (1887–1952)

Nat D. Ayer
- c. 1916
- Born: Nathaniel Davis Ayer; August 5, 1887; Boston, Massachusetts, U.S.
- Died: September 19, 1952 (aged 65); Bath, Somerset, England
- Occupations: Composer, pianist, singer, actor
- Known for: "Oh, You Beautiful Doll" (1911) "If You Were the Only Girl In the World" (1916)
- Notable work: The Bing Boys Are Here (1916); Yes, Uncle (1917)

Nathaniel Davis Ayer (August 5, 1887 – September 19, 1952) was an American composer, pianist, singer, and actor. He made most of his career composing and performing in England in Edwardian musical comedy and revue. He also contributed songs to Broadway shows, including some of the Ziegfeld Follies.

Ayer's most successful shows were the World War I hits The Bing Boys Are Here (1916) and Yes, Uncle (1917). His best-known Broadway song was "Oh, You Beautiful Doll" (1911). Of his many songs composed for London shows, his most famous is probably "If You Were the Only Girl In the World" (1916). After the war, he had less success and was declared bankrupt in 1938.

== Life and career ==
=== Early years ===
Ayer was born Nathaniel Davis in Boston, Massachusetts. His first big hit was the song "Oh, You Beautiful Doll" (1911), with words by A. Seymour Brown (1885–1947). He wrote songs for Broadway revues and musical comedies including Miss Innocence (1908), The Newlyweds and their Baby (1909), Ziegfeld Follies of 1909, The Echo (1910), A Winsome Widow, The Wall Street Girl, Let George Do It (all 1912) and Ziegfeld Follies of 1916.

Ayer first visited London as a member of the Ragtime Octet in the years before the First World War. In 1912, he contributed to the West End revue Hullo, Ragtime the song "You’re My Baby" with words by Brown. In 1913, he appeared at the Tivoli music hall in the Strand, with Harry Williams, performing songs of their own composition, with Ayer at the piano. Later in the same year, the two appeared in The Hippodrome Revue, when The Times described them thus:

Mr. Harry Williams and Mr Nat D. Ayer are an American pair of a type now becoming familiar to London. One sings, one plays the piano and sings; both wear pronounced evening dress, and both perform ragtime. For complicated syncopation perhaps one of the songs sung by the gentleman at the piano is (in ragtime's native idiom) "the limit".

One of Ayer's and Williams's songs, "That Ragtime Suffragette", was the subject of a court case in October 1913, when the lyricist and composer successfully took action to prevent others from violating its copyright.

=== West End shows ===
In 1916, Ayer composed the music for the hit show The Bing Boys Are Here, with a book by George Grossmith Jr. and Fred Thompson and lyrics by Clifford Grey. His best-known song from that show is "If You Were the Only Girl In the World", adapted from a song by Willy Redstone which he had sold to Bert Feldman. In the same year, Ayer appeared with Alice Delysia in the revue Pell-Mell, with songs by Ayer and Grey. Ayer's last show of 1916, which he composed and appeared in, was the musical comedy Houp La!, starring Gertie Millar. It was not a success, running for just over 100 performances, but Ayer's next show, Yes, Uncle, had a run of 626 performances.

Ayer's post-war shows were Baby Bunting (1919), Snap, Shufflin' Along and The Smith Family (1922). In 1938, he was declared bankrupt. He appeared as himself in the 1943 film Variety Jubilee.

Ayer died in 1952 in Bath, in the west of England, at the age of 65.
