= The Hotel Mouse (musical) =

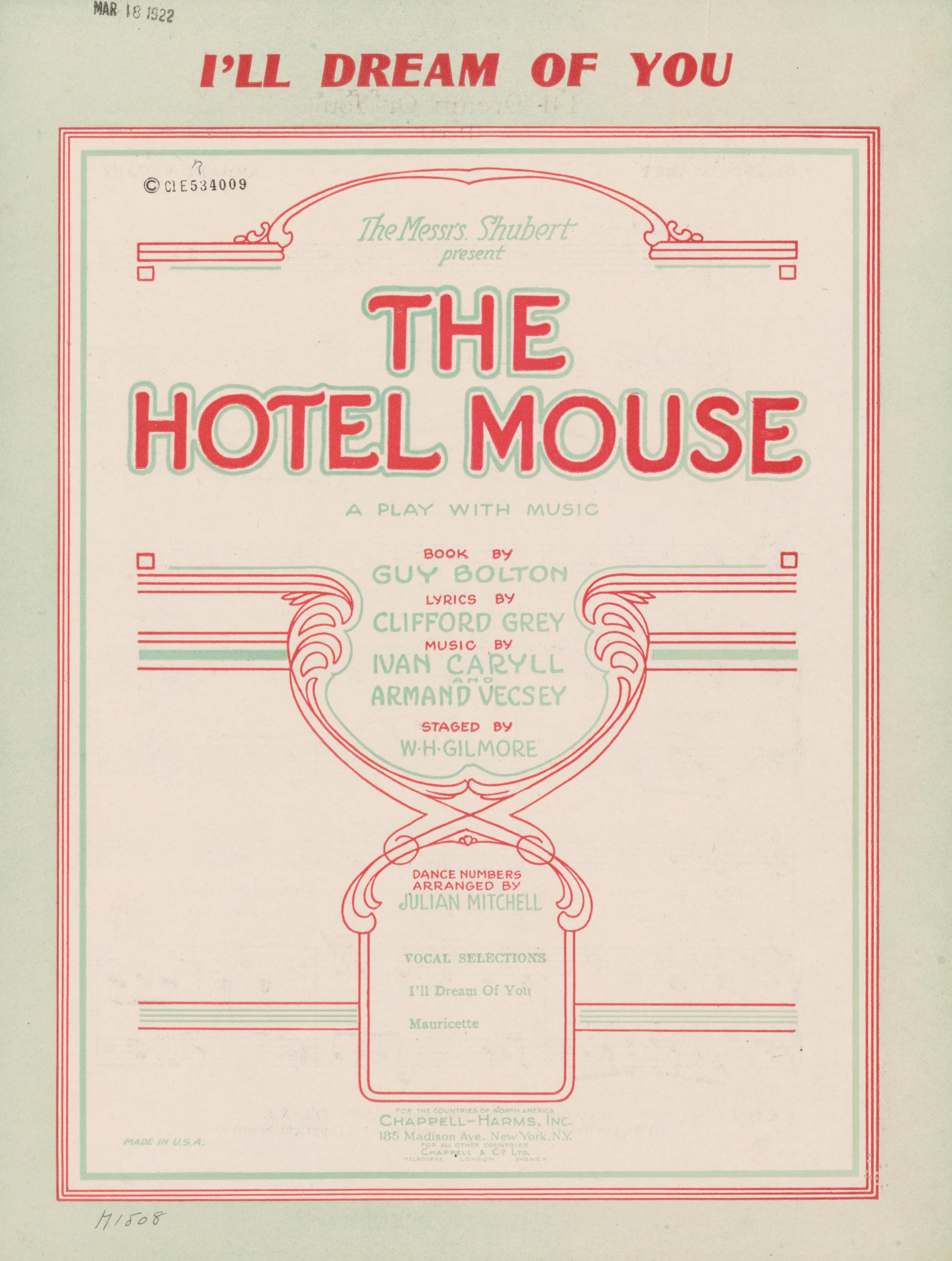
- Sheet music
- Music: Ivan Caryll and Armand Vecsey
- Lyrics: Clifford Grey
- Book: Guy Bolton

The Hotel Mouse is a musical comedy with music by Armand Vecsey and Ivan Caryll, lyrics by Clifford Grey, and book by Guy Bolton, with additional music by Bert Hanlon, and additional lyrics by Alfred Bryan. The book is based on the French comedy Le souris d'hôtel by Marcel Gerbidon and Paul Armont and concerns a female cat burglar in Monte Carlo given the nickname "the hotel mouse" by the local police; one of her marks falls in love with her.

It was produced in 1922 on Broadway by the Shubert brothers, followed by a tour.

== Background ==
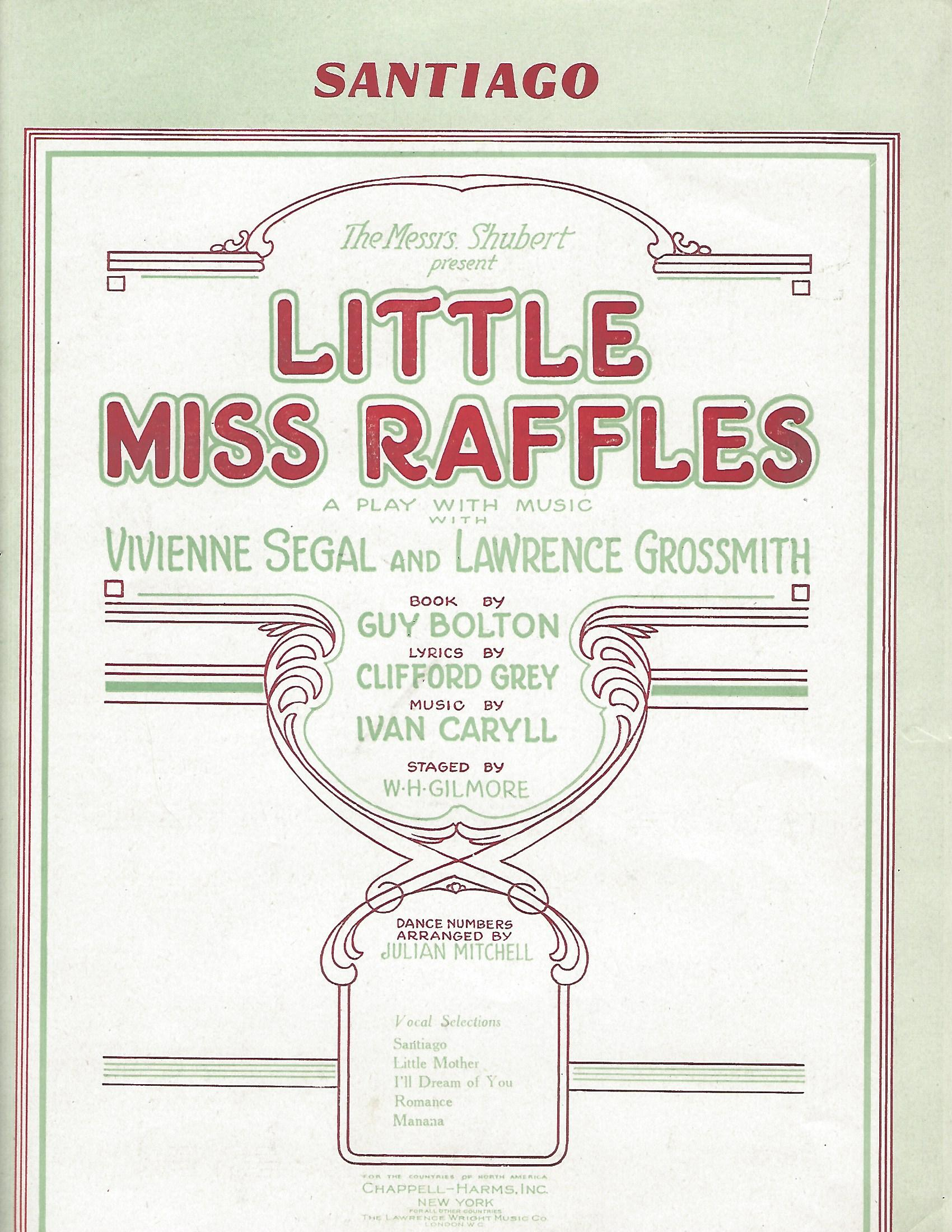
Sheet Music

Ivan Caryll had worked with Guy Bolton previously on The Girl Behind the Gun (1918). The Hotel Mouse was originally titled Little Miss Raffles, but the composer died before finishing the score, notwithstanding the erroneous headline of November 30, 1921, in The New York Times: "Ivan Caryll dies as he finishes play – Noted Composer Stricken With Hemorrhage at rehearsal of Little Miss Raffles". The article went on to say, “His death came just a week before his latest 'comedy with music', as he liked to term his works, was to have its first performance in New Haven" Connecticut.. On December 1, 1921, the same newspaper reported that Little Miss Raffles would be presented at the Astor Theatre on December 13, 1921. It further reported that it "will have Vivienne Segal and Lawrence Grossmith in the leading roles." The show did not play at the Astor; after Caryll's death, it was completed, renamed The Hotel Mouse, and produced at the Shubert three months later with a different cast and with music mostly by Armand Vecsey.

== Production ==
The Hotel Mouse premiered on Broadway at the Shubert Theatre on March 13, 1922, and closed on May 27, 1922, after 88 performances. It was staged by John Harwood and choreographed by Max Scheck, with scenic and costume design by Watson Barratt. The music director was Ira Jacobs.

The original cast included Frances White as Mauricette, Taylor Holmes as Wally Gordon, Barnett Parker as Burroughs and Fay Marbe as Lola. The New York Times' opening night review said: “It is not quite fair to apply the word ‘cute’ to Francis White, for she is a good deal more than that. Last night's audience was never quite able to get enough of her. ... She has a new song with a riddle in it – one that the audience demanded to hear six or seven times last night, and which, as Miss White sang it, was well worth the encores.”

The Broadway production was followed by a tour. On May 28, 1922, The New York Times reported: “The Hotel Mouse with Frances White and Taylor Holmes, now moves to Chicago.”

The play by Paul Armont and Marcel Gerbidon that was the basis of the musical was also the basis of the 1923 British silent crime film of the same name as the musical.

== Plot ==
In Monte Carlo, a young woman, Mauricette, is known to the police as "The Hotel Mouse". Although she is a good girl, she had been taught in her childhood to be a thief. An accomplished cat burglar and master of disguise, she has the uncanny skill to sneak in and out of hotels on the Riviera and steal jewelry from the rich patrons. One night she is holed up at the Hotel des Anglais in the room of Wally Gordon, a rich young man. Wally falls in love with Mauricette and protects her from the detectives waiting in the hall even though he has caught her trying to steal from his room. She sleeps in his pajamas and his bed while he sleeps on the floor. Wally teaches her the error of her ways, she reforms, and they marry happily.

== Roles and original cast ==
- Burroughs – Barnett Parker
- Tiny – Lois Wood
- Bob Biddle – Al Sexton
- Lola – Fay Marbe
- Don Esteban – Stewart Baird
- Wally Gordon – Taylor Holmes
- Caesar – Richard Temple
- Mauricette – Frances White
- Detective – Frank Green
- Victor – Ted Stevens
- Marquis de Santa Bella – Francis Lieb
- Albert – Elliott Taylor
- Adele – Cynthea Perot
- Guests at the hotel

== Songs ==
All lyrics by Grey, except as noted

Act 1

- Opening (music by Vecsey) – Adele and Ensemble
- Why Do the Girls (music by Caryll) – Bob and Girls
- Nearly True to You (music by Caryll) – Lola, Don and Bob
- Quintette (music by Caryll) – Mauricette, Caesar, Bob, Adele, Lola
- Romance (music by Caryll and Vecsey) – Wally and Lola
- I'll Dream of You (music by Vecsey) – Wally and Lola
- Finale (music by Vecsey)

Act 2

- Oozey Woozey (music by Vecsey) – Lola, Tiny, Bob, Burroughs, Albert, Adele and Ensemble
- Mauricette (music by Vecsey) – Mauricette and Men
- One Touch of Loving (music by Vecsey) – Mauricette, Wally and Ensemble
- Rhyming (music by Vecsey) – Wally and Burroughs
- Finale (music by Vecsey)

Act 3

- Where the Lanterns Gleam (music by Vecsey) – Don and Ensemble
- Little Mother (music by Caryll and Vecsey) – Mauricette and Wally
- Everything I Do Goes Wrong (music by Vecsey) – Mauricette
- Round on the End and High in the Middle (music by Hanlon; lyrics by Bryan) – Mauricette
- Finale (music by Vecsey)
