= Doris Stocker =

British actress and singer (1886–1968)

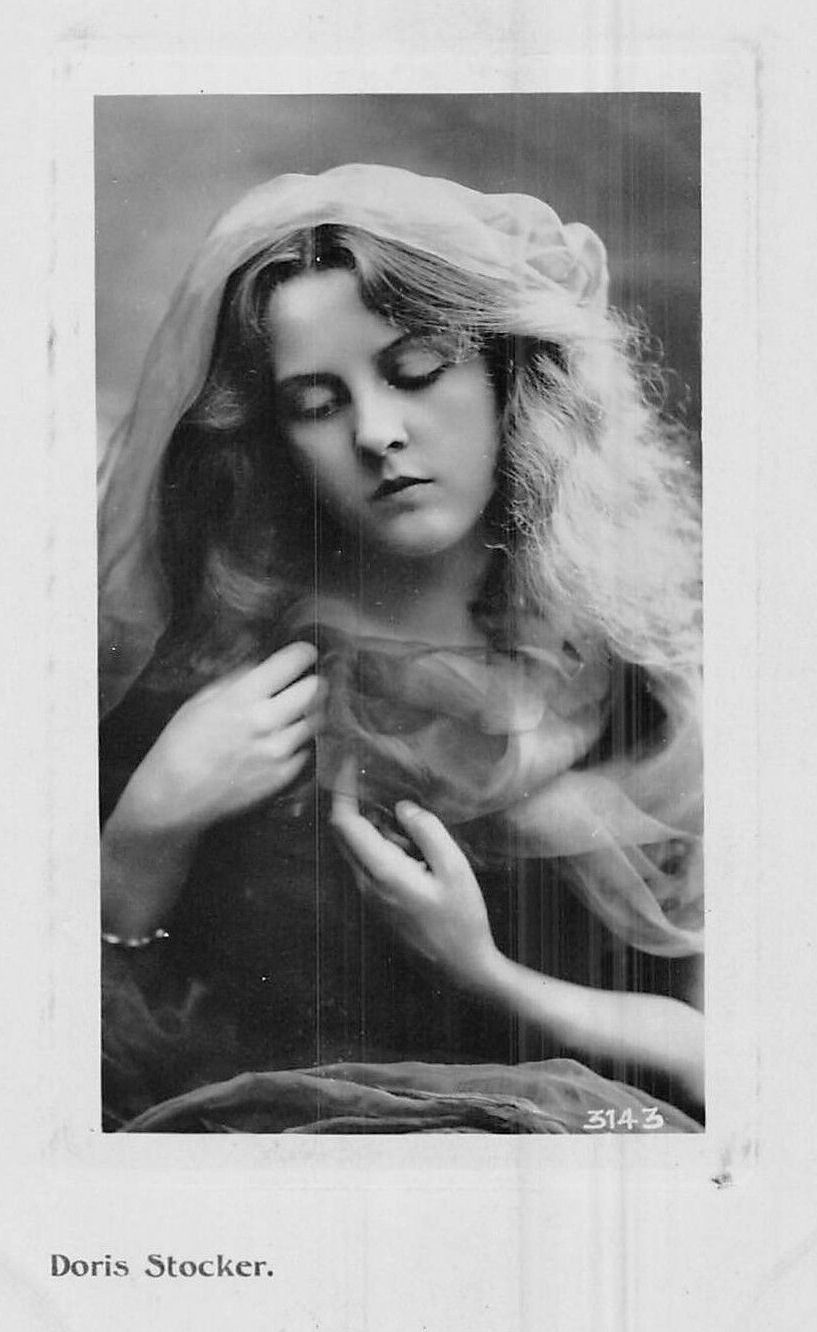
- Doris Stocker in 1906
- Born: 1886; Bombay, British India
- Died: December 16, 1968 (aged 81–82); Kensington, London, England
- Other names: Lady Segrave
- Occupation: Actress
- Spouse: Henry O'Neal De Hane Segrave (m. 1917)

Doris Mary Stocker (Lady Segrave) (1886 – 16 December 1968) was a British actress and singer, especially in Edwardian musical comedy.

== Early life and career ==
She was born in Bombay in India in 1886, the second of three children of George Stocker (1857–1929), an engineer, and Mary Dunn née Johnston (1862–1946). While her father remained in India for work her mother returned to England with the children where they lived in London from at least 1891 to 1911. Her older sister Blanche Stocker was also a stage actress and singer.

Stocker began her career as a chorus girl under George Edwardes at the Gaiety Theatre in London and soon played roles in West End theatres: Grace Hufnagle in Captain Kidd at Wyndham's Theatre (1904); Angy Loftus in The Cingalee at Daly's Theatre (1904); Pepzi in A Waltz Dream at Daly's (1911); Lady Diana Camden in Theodore & Co at the Gaiety (1912); Gipsy Dancer in Gipsy Love at Daly's (1912); and the Honorable Baby Vereker in To-Night's the Night at the Shubert Theatre in New York (1914), repeating the role in London at the Gaiety (1915).

== War, marriage and death ==
In 1915 at the height of World War I she accompanied Sylvia Brett and Charles Vyner Brooke, whom she hardly knew, on a Japanese steamer to Sarawak, Malaysia, to visit Charles Brooke, the Rajah of Sarawak.

At Marylebone, London, on 4 October 1917 she married Sir Henry O'Neal De Hane Segrave (1896–1930), then serving in the war as a Captain in the Royal Warwickshire Regiment and the Royal Flying Corps. After her marriage she retired from the stage.

Stocker died in Kensington, London, in 1968, leaving £76,135 in her will.
