= Blanche Stocker =

British actress and singer

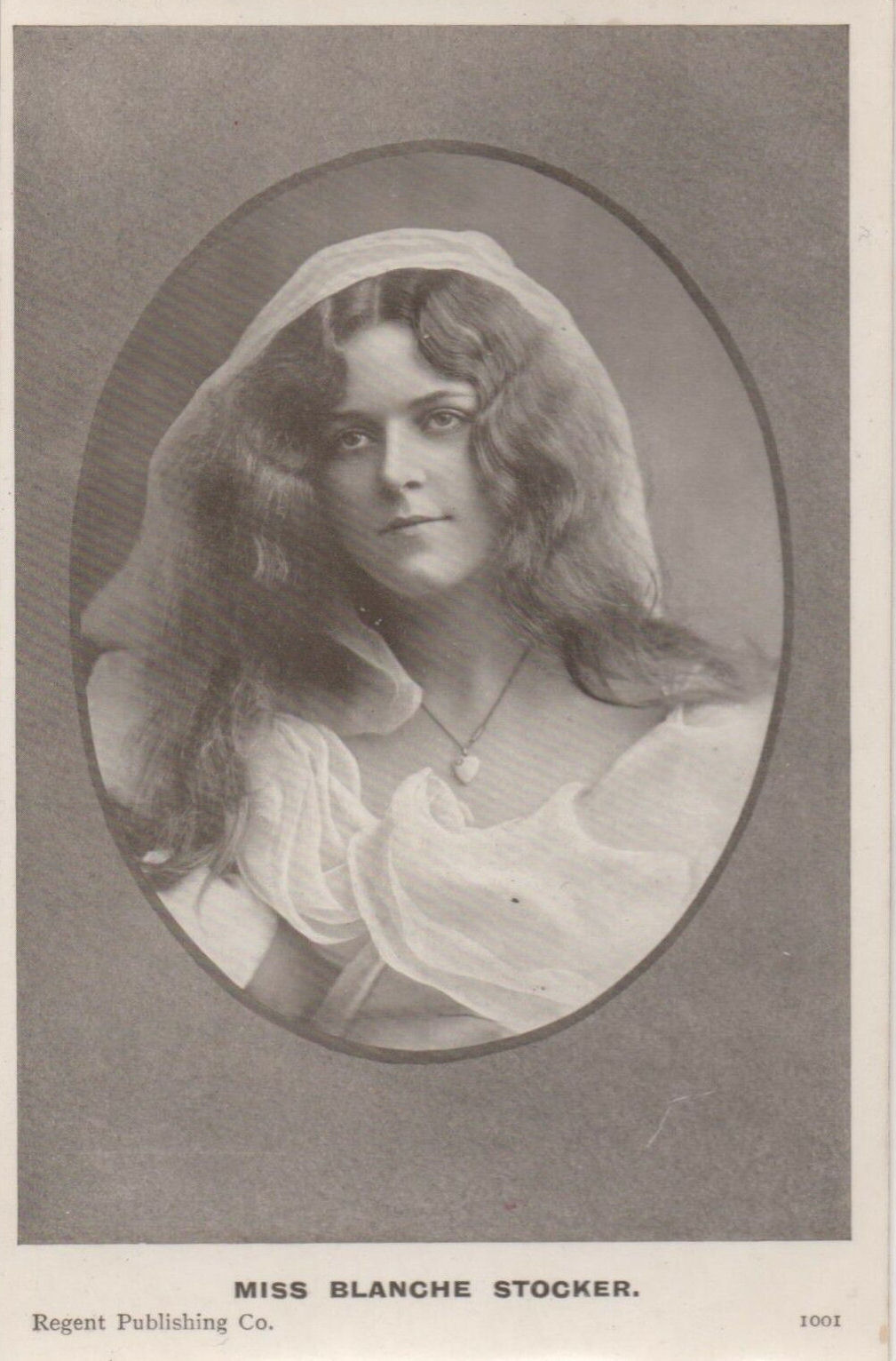
Blanche Stocker in 1906

Blanche Eleanor Stocker (20 July 1884 – 1950) was a British actress and singer, who played minor roles in a string of Edwardian musical comedies and other stage works early in the 20th century. She also played a film role.

== Life and career ==
Stocker was born in Bombay in India in 1884, the oldest of three children of a British couple, George Stocker (1857–1929), an engineer, and Mary Dunn née Johnston (1862–1946). While George remained in India for work, Mary returned to England with the children to live in London from at least 1891 to 1911. Her younger sister Doris Stocker was also a singer and actress.

Stocker played roles in several Edwardian musical comedies early in her career, including Lucille in The Belle of Brittany at the Queen's Theatre (1908). For producer George Edwardes she was Lady Sybil Julia James in Our Miss Gibbs (1909); Ethel in Peggy (1910); and Viola in The Girl on the Film (1913), all at the Gaiety Theatre in the West End of London; she also appeared in the latter work at the 44th Street Theatre on Broadway later in 1913. She was Ruth Goldman/Miss Cohen in Potash and Perlmutter at the Queen's Theatre (1914–15); Lady-in-Waiting in Arlette at the Shaftesbury Theatre (1917); and appeared as Goo Goo in The Bing Boys Are Here (1916) and The Bing Girls Are There (1917), both at the Alhambra Theatre.

She played Jane in the silent film Winning a Widow (1910).

Stocker died in Kensington in London in 1950 aged 65. She never married.
