= Austen Hurgon =

Actor, singer, and theatre director (1867–1942)

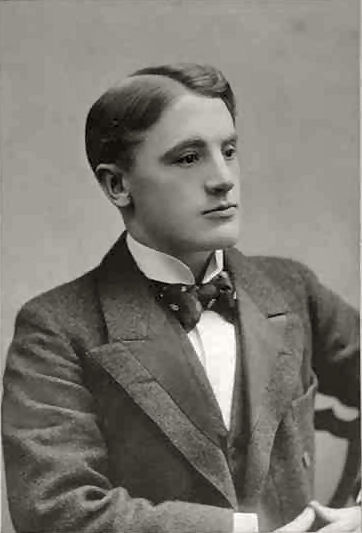
Austen Hurgon in 1906

Austen Hurgon (1867 – 24 June 1942) was an actor, singer, theatre director and librettist for several successful Edwardian musical comedies of the 1900s and 1910s.

== Early life ==
Born as Richard Cornelius Horgan in London in 1867 to Irish parents Timothy Horgan (1838 – c. 1901), a provisions merchant, and Helena née Callanan (1839–1913), he married Constance Aimee Hurst née Daniel (1872–1951) in London in 1900, at which time he gave his occupation as "stage manager". The two had a son, Richard Kenneth Hurgon (1902–1994).

== Theatre career ==
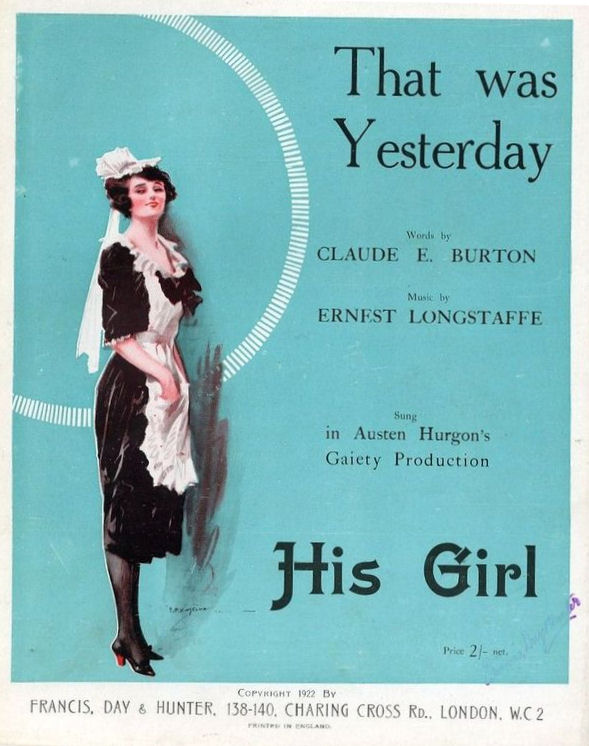
Sheet music from His Girl (1922)

Hurgon began his theatre career with the supporting rôle of Alberto in the musical Miss Wingrove (1905), with songs by Howard Talbot, which Hurgon produced and directed for Frank Curzon, for whom he next directed The White Chrysanthemum (1905) and The Girl Behind the Counter (1906). Following these successes Hurgon became the director at the Prince of Wales Theatre in London where, when Paul Rubens was indisposed due to ill health while working on Miss Hook of Holland, Hurgon quickly replaced him and finished writing the book and directed the play. Miss Hook was another success, and he moved on to direct My Mimosa Maid (1908) for Curzon. However, The Three Kisses (1907) at the Apollo Theatre and My Mimosa Maid failed, and his association with Curzon ended, his management having lasted for just four performances of the latter piece. Next Hurgon directed The Hon'ble Phil (1908) and Kitty Grey (1909) with music by Talbot at the New Amsterdam Theatre in New York. For C. H. Workman he took over the management of and directed the failing musical Two Merry Monarchs (1910) at the Strand Theatre, the last piece that can be considered a Savoy opera.

At the London Hippodrome he directed the revue Hullo, Ragtime! and its sequels for Albert de Courville and wrote the libretti for the one-act operettas that were included in those revues during 1913. Hurgon wrote a pastiche of Hullo, Ragtime! as What Ho! Ragtime, which was performed at the Chiswick Empire. In 1910 he directed Ivan Caryll's Marriage a la Carte and Leslie Stuart's The Slim Princess on Broadway.

For George Grossmith Jr. and Edward Laurillard he directed the musical comedy To-Night's the Night, which opened at the Shubert Theatre in New York in December 1914 and then at the Gaiety Theatre in London, opening in April 1915. He next directed Theodore & Co (1916), which ran for 503 performances. Again for Grossmith and Laurillard he wrote the book with George Arthurs for Yes, Uncle! (1917), which ran for a very successful 626 performances. With Herbert C. Sargent he wrote Girl Wanted (1916) for the London Opera House, while with George Arthurs he wrote the book for the musical Suzette; the English version of the operetta Arlette (1917) at the Shaftesbury Theatre, with songs by Ivor Novello, and The Girl for the Boy (1919), an adaptation of Paul Gavault's La Petite Chocolatière. He produced and directed Ivor Novello's comic opera The Golden Moth (1921) at the Adelphi Theatre and his own His Girl (1922) at the Gaiety, but both had only moderate success, and he retired.

He died of cancer in Folkestone, in 1942 aged 73, leaving £11,584 15s 10d in his will and was buried in Kensal Green Cemetery.
