= Jane Vieu =

French composer

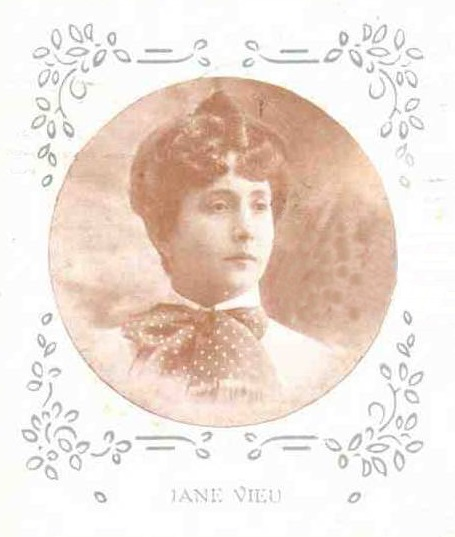
Jane Vieu

Jeanne Élisabeth Marie Vieu, also known as Jane Vieu, (15 July 1871, in Béziers – 8 April 1955, in Paris), was a French composer who also published works under the pseudonym Pierre Valette.

== Biography ==
Vieu was born as Jeanne Fabre at Béziers. Vieu was the daughter of pianist Marie-Élodie Fabre, who taught music. She started composing at the age of 11. Vieu studied composition with Jules Massenet, singing with Marie Caroline Miolan-Carvalho, and counterpoint and fugue with André Gedalge. She gained recognition thanks to her operetta Madame Tallien (1902), and because of her fairy tale La belle au bois dormant (1902), the first performance of which took place at the Théâtre des Mathurins. Other successful titles of her hand are Au bal de Flore, Les Petites entravées (1911), and Aladin, ombres chinoises (1904).

Vieu published about 100 works, some under her pseudonym Pierre Valette, including orchestral, chamber, piano, and operas. Her music has been classified as 19th-century due to its formal and harmonic character.

She operated a publishing company with her presumed husband Maurice Vieu between 1907 and 1925. They opened a publishing house in Paris called Maurice Vieu and Jane Vieu.

She died in Paris in 1955.

== Works ==
Selected works include:

- Puisque c'est l'été (text: Robert de la Villehervé)
- Madame Tallien (Thérésia Cabarrus), (historical piece, text: Paul Berthelot and Claude Roland)
- La belle au bois dormant (song)
- Sérénade japonaise (song)
- Arlette (operetta, text: Claude Roland and Louis Bouvet)
- Le Bonhomme de neige
- L'Amour en grève (operetta, text: Jacques Lemaire and Henry Houry)
- Les Yeux Verts (song)
- Salomette (operetta, text: Jean Séry)
- Sur le pont d'Avignon (fantasie-operétte, text: L. de Lahitte)
- Piege d'amour (operetta)
