= Their Night Out =

- Directed by: Harry Hughes
- Written by: Arthur H. Miller (play); George Arthurs (play); Harry Hughes
- Produced by: Harry Hughes
- Starring: Claude Hulbert; Renée Houston; Gus McNaughton; Binnie Barnes
- Cinematography: Walter J. Harvey
- Edited by: Walter Stokvis
- Production company: British International Pictures
- Distributed by: Wardour Films
- Release date: March 1933
- Running time: 74 minutes
- Country: United Kingdom
- Language: English

Their Night Out (also known as His Night Out) is a 1933 British comedy film directed by Harry Hughes and starring Claude Hulbert, Renée Houston and Gus McNaughton. It was written by Hughes based on the play by Arthur H. Miller and George Arthurs.

== Cast ==
- Claude Hulbert as Jimmy Oliphant
- Renée Houston as Maggie Oliphant
- Gus McNaughton as Fred Simpson
- Binnie Barnes as Lola
- Jimmy Godden as Archibald Bunting
- Amy Veness as Gertrude Bunting
- Judy Kelly as Betty Oliphant
- Ben Welden as crook
- Hal Gordon as Sgt. Bert Simpson
- Marie Ault as cook

== Production ==
It made by British International Pictures at Elstree Studios. The film's sets were designed by the art director Duncan Sutherland.

== Reception ==
Kine Weekly wrote: "The stage and radio, represented by Renee Houston and Claude Hulbert, combine to bring laughter and gaiety to this lively comedy atsurdity, a blending of all that experience has proved to be essential to popular light entertainment. The familiar twists, gags and complications are put over with irrepressible enthusiasm, and the simple, straight forward fun is certain to register with the masses. ... Night-club scenes are elaborate, the musical accompanimentt is tuneful, the interiors are artistic, and lighting and photography are excellent."

Picturegoer wrote: "Good promise is shown by Renee Houston, the famous music hall artiste ... Claude Hulbert is fair as the asinine husband, and the supporting cast does quite well. It is all very familiar fare, with a liberal sprinkling of slapstick played in a time-honoured manner and hardly notable for subtlety."
