= Arlette (musical) =

Joseph Coyne as the Prince and Winifred Barnes as Arlette in Arlette

Arlette is a 1917 operetta in three acts by Austen Hurgon and George Arthurs with lyrics by Adrian Ross and Clifford Grey. Produced by George Grossmith Jr. and Edward Laurillard it was adapted from the French with music by Jane Vieu, Guy Le Feuvre and Ivor Novello. It opened at the Shaftesbury Theatre in London on 6 September 1917 where it ran for 260 performances. It starred Winifred Barnes, Joseph Coyne and Stanley Lupino.

Originally produced in Brussels in October 1904 with music by Jane Vieu and a book and lyrics by Claude Roland and Louis Bouvet, it underwent considerable alteration for the British production resulting in only two of Vieu's songs remaining while the rest were specially written for the show by Ivor Novello and Guy Le Feuvre. The critic for The Stage commented that these changes reduced the piece from an operetta to a musical comedy. The London production was directed by Austen Hurgon, and the musical director was Leonard Hornsey. The play's opening night coincided with the worst of the German air raids on London during World War I, but the cast decided to continue with evening performances. In 1936 the show was revised and retitled How Do, Princess?, with six new songs by Novello, but the subsequent tour of the British provinces was a financial disaster and quickly closed. On 14 October 1937 a one-hour condensed version was broadcast on BBC Radio with Jean Colin as Arlette and Tommy Handley as Rono.

== Synopsis ==
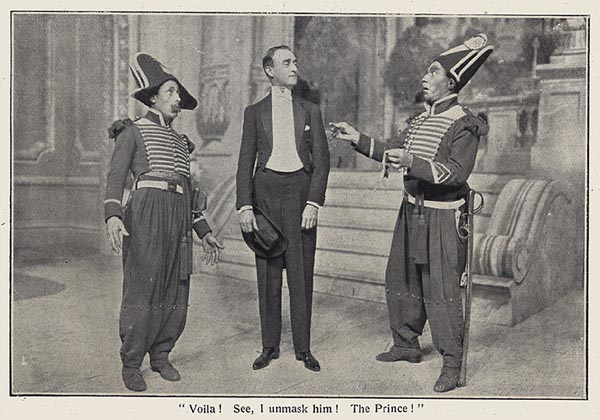
"Voila! See, I unmask him! The Prince!" – Mussiere as Adhemar, Coyne as Paul and Servais as Anatole

- Act 1: 3pm – The Prince's Private Apartments in the Palace
- Act 2: Same Evening – The Casino
- Act 3: Next Morning (3 am) – The Council Hall in the Palace
- Time: The Present

Prince Paul needs to marry a wealthy woman to save Perania, his bankrupt country, and he is advertised for marriage by his Ministers of State. The ad is seen by Cherry, the daughter of American millionaire Cyrus B. Waters, and as she is keen on the idea of becoming a princess the necessary arrangements are made. Soon afterwards, however, Arlette, the maid of honour to the country's Queen dowager, wanders by chance into the prince's private apartments where he is contemplating his financial difficulties. Arlette mistakes the prince for somebody else, and he, delighted by her naivety and charm, does not correct her. They discuss the many good attributes of the prince, and Paul gives her a private telephone number ("The Telephone Song"). Meanwhile, an armed revolution against Perania is being led by Kalitza, a woman who loves the prince's chief bodyguard, Rono. Rono (one of the army of four) is persuaded by Kalitza to assassinate the prince, but he bungles the attempt, angering Kalitza, and she decides to do the deed herself.

In the evening a fancy dress ball is held at the casino during which it is discovered that the country's crown jewels have been stolen, but in reality they have been pawned by the Prince, who, caught by the comic gendarmes Anatole and Adhémar in disguise at the ball, arrest him. They are disconcerted to discover that the supposed thief is actually their prince. Paul abdicates so that he can put all these troubles behind him and marry his sweetheart, Arlette. Kalitza, disarmed by his abdication, decides to spare his life. His cousin, the Duke of Aristo, takes the throne and marries Cherry: the kingdom's finances are restored, the revolutionaries are pleased, and Arlette and Paul live in peace and happiness.

== Cast ==
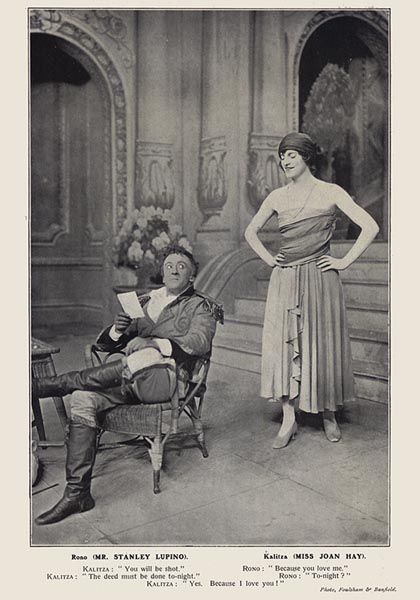
Lupino and Hay

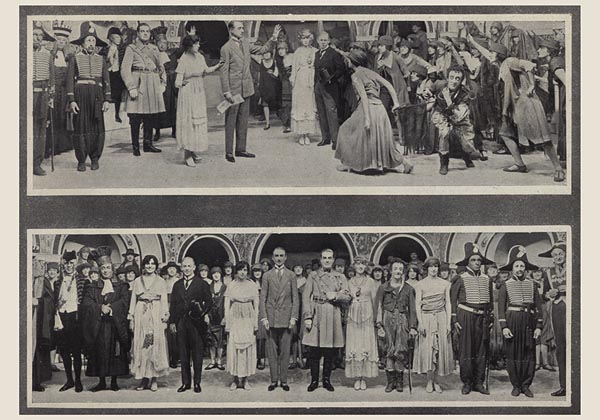
The Ensemble

- Arlette – Winifred Barnes
- Prince Paul of Perania – Joseph Coyne
- Rono, a common soldier – Stanley Lupino
- The Duke of Aristo – Leonard Mackay
- Cherry Waters – Adrah Fair
- C.B. Waters, an American millionaire – Johnnie Fields
- Kalitza, a revolutionary – Joan Hay
- Sergine, Mistress of the Household – Mary Robson
- Adhémar, 1st Policeman – Lucien Mussiere
- Anatole, 2nd Policeman – Yvan Servais
- Chancellor – A. G. Poulton
- Minister of Finance – Wyn Weaver
- Minister of the Interior – Murray Moore
- Minister of Justice – Strafford Moss
- 1st Lady-in-Waiting – Mabel Melbourne
- 2nd Lady-in-Waiting – Blanche Stocker
- 3rd Lady-in-Waiting – Ursula Fenton
- Court Officials, Ladies in Waiting and Revolutionaries

== Musical numbers ==
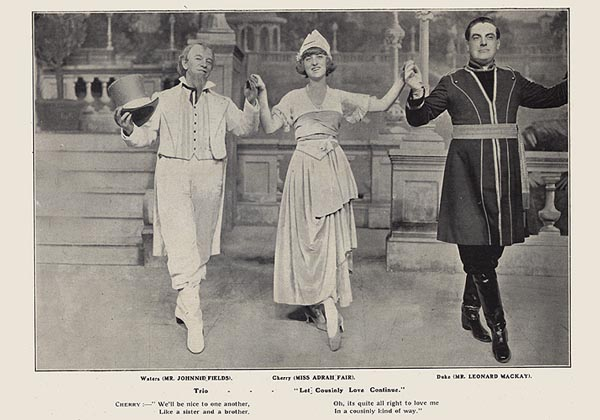
Fields, Fair and Mackay

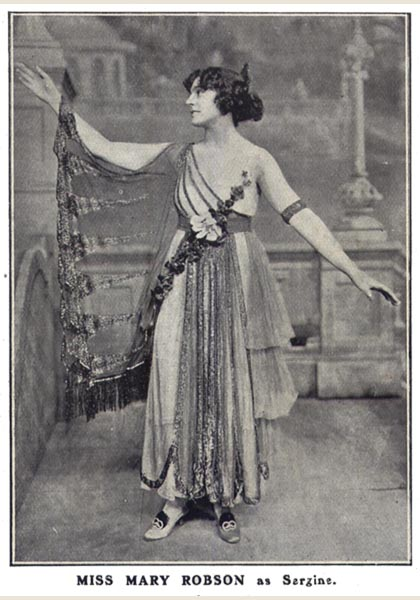
Robson as Sergine

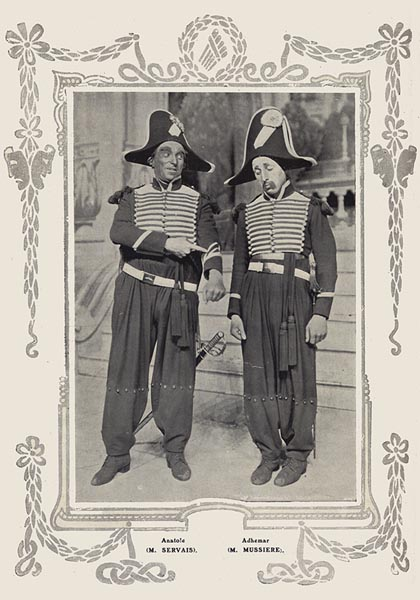
Servais and Mussiere

=== Act I ===
- Introduction (Music by Jane Vieu)
- Entrance of the Prince – "Hail! All Hail!" (Grey & Novello)
- Paul – "Going. Going. Gone" (Ross & Le Feuvre)
- Rono – "On the Staff" (Grey & Novello)
- Cherry – "Love Bells" (Grey & Novello)
- Duke – "The Man of Forty" (Grey & Novello)
- Kalitza & Rono – "Revolution" (Ross & Le Feuvre)
- Arlette (Telephone Song) – "Love In My Heart Is Ringing" (Ross & Le Feuvre)
- Finale (Ross, Grey & Le Feuvre)

=== Act II ===
- Chorus (Ross, Grey & Le Feuvre)
- Cherry, Duke & Waters – "Cousinly Love" (Grey & Novello)
- Rono & Policemen – "Graft" (Ross & Le Feuvre)
- Sergine & Waters – "Someone Very Like You" (Ross & Le Feuvre)
- Arlette & Paul – "Didn't Know the Way To" (Grey & Novello)
- Farandole (Ross & Vieu)
- Cherry & Duke – "Stage Love" (Ross & Le Feuvre)
- Arlette – "The Fairy Ring" (Ross & Le Feuvre)
- Finale (Ross & Le Feuvre)

=== Act III ===
- Arlette – "It's Just a Memory" (Grey & Novello)
- Duke – "His Country First of All (The People's King)" (Grey & Novello)
- Finale (Grey & Novello)

Ivor Novello contributed the music to eight songs in the production. The critic for The Times, writing of Novello's songs, commented on his "light and pretty numbers, without much character, but with plenty of agreeable melody."

A cast album was released in 1917 recorded with the Mayfair Orchestra. Another album, titled Gems from 'Arlett', was released by His Master's Voice in 1917 with the Light Opera Company and featured: "Love In My Heart Is Ringing (The Telephone Song)", "The Fairy Ring", "His Country First of All", "The People’s King", "On the Staff", "Didn’t Know the Way To", "Cousinly Love" and "It’s Just a Memory". It was conducted by George W. Byng, and the vocal artistes included George Baker, Bessie Jones and Ernest Pike.

== Review ==
The critic for the Lloyds Weekly News wrote of the production:

The magnificence of the mounting of Arlette at the Shaftesbury will set old playgoers thinking for all that it is called an "operetta," it is molded on traditional lines, and possesses sparkling music. The tale is of the impecunious Prince Paul of Perania (Mr. Joseph Coyne), who prefers Arlette, a modest attendant on the Queen Dowager (Miss Winifred Barnes), to all the vast wealth of Miss Walters from America (Miss Adrah Fair). There is here some sort of a likeness to The Merry Widow, which first introduced Mr. Joseph Coyne as a peerless prince. Paul of Perania (perennial it might almost be) is, however, much more of what we term a Bertrand Wallis part, and a lady has even to look at a photograph of the princeling and talk of his good looks. Mr. Coyne makes much fun of this incident, but somehow it doesn't assist the love interest.
