= Clifford Grey =

English songwriter, actor and screenwriter (1887–1941)

Grey in 1921

Clifford Grey (5 January 1887 – 25 September 1941) was an English songwriter, librettist and screenwriter. His birth name was Percival Davis, and he was also known as Clifford Gray.

Grey contributed prolifically to dozens of West End and Broadway shows, for the period from the First World War to the Second World War, as librettist and lyricist for composers including Ivor Novello, Jerome Kern, Howard Talbot, Ivan Caryll and George Gershwin. Among his best-remembered songs are two from early in his career, in 1916: "If You Were the Only Girl (In the World)" and "Another Little Drink Wouldn't Do Us Any Harm". His later hits include "Got a Date with an Angel" and "Spread a Little Happiness". He also wrote lyrics and screenplays for dozens of films released from 1929 to 1941, and they were used in films released posthumously.

For 35 years after 1979 it was widely believed that Grey secretly competed as an American bobsleigher, under the name Clifford "Tippy" Gray, in two Winter Olympics, in 1928 and 1932, winning gold medals, but it was finally shown that the sportsman was a different person.

== Life and career ==
=== Early years ===
Grey was born in Birmingham, Warwickshire, the son of George Davis, a whip manufacturer, and his wife Emma, née Lowe. He was educated at the King Edward VI School. On leaving school in 1903 he had a variety of office jobs, in none of which he had any success. He became a pierrot with a local concert party, and adopted the stage name Clifford Grey, performing in pubs, piers and music halls. By the time he married in 1912 he had reduced his stage performing in favour of writing lyrics for West End shows. His wife was Dorothy Maud Mary Gould (1890 or 1891–1940), a fellow member of the concert party. They had two daughters, June and Dorothy; Grey also adopted Gould's daughter. Their marriage lasted until Dorothy's death.

In 1916 Grey had his big breakthrough as a writer, collaborating with the American composer Nat Ayer on The Bing Boys Are Here, a long-running revue that opened in London in April, and contained two of Grey's early successes, "If You Were the Only Girl (In the World)" and "Another Little Drink Wouldn't Do Us Any Harm". He collaborated with Ayer on Pell-Mell, The Bing Girls Are There, The Other Bing Boys, The Bing Brothers on Broadway, and Yes, Uncle! and with Herman Finck in Hallo, America!, Ivor Novello and Jerome Kern in Theodore & Co, Howard Talbot and Novello in Who's Hooper?, Novello in Arlette (1917) and Ivan Caryll in Kissing Time. On the last show he collaborated with P.G. Wodehouse, who was privately lukewarm about Grey's talent, regarding him as a specialist in adapting other people's work rather than as an original talent. (Note: According to the Oxford Dictionary of National Biography, Wodehouse's views did not prevent his purchasing a plot from Grey on one occasion.)

=== 1920s – Broadway and Hollywood ===
In 1920 Grey was invited to New York by Kern to renew their collaboration, writing Florenz Ziegfeld's Sally. Grey remained in the US for most of the decade, with occasional sorties back to London for Phi-Phi with Henri Christiné (1922), The Smith Family with Ayer (1922), and The Rainbow with George Gershwin (1923). For Broadway, he provided a regular stream of lyrics – and some libretti – for musical comedies and revues. His collaborators included Sigmund Romberg and Melville Gideon on some of the less-remembered shows, Ivan Caryll and Guy Bolton on The Hotel Mouse (1922), Vincent Youmans on Hit the Deck (1927), and Rudolph Friml and Wodehouse on The Three Musketeers (1928) and Ups-A-Daisy with Robert A. Simon for the Shubert Theatre (1928). With William Cary Duncan he co-authored the book and lyrics for Sunny Days (1928, based on Grey's 1925 play A Kiss in a Taxi) at the Imperial Theatre.

The introduction of talking pictures attracted Grey to Hollywood. He collaborated with Victor Schertzinger on the 1929 Maurice Chevalier and Jeanette MacDonald film, The Love Parade, and with Oscar Straus on The Smiling Lieutenant (1931), and contributed to films with a range of stars from Ramon Novarro to Lawrence Tibbett to Marion Davies. His songs and lyrics from shows were used in many films, and he wrote screenplays and lyrics for fourteen new Hollywood films between 1929 and 1931, including The Vagabond Lover (1929), In Gay Madrid (1930) and The Smiling Lieutenant (1931). After his death Grey's songs continued to be used in films and television productions. His best known song, "If You Were the Only Girl (in the World)", appeared in such films as Lilacs in the Spring (1954), The Bridge on the River Kwai (1957) and The Cat's Meow (2001), and some films, such as Hit the Deck (1955), were adaptations of his shows. In 1929, he returned temporarily to London, where he collaborated with Vivian Ellis on the musical Mr Cinders, which had a long West End run and featured one of Grey's best-remembered songs, "Spread a Little Happiness". (Note: "Spread a Little Happiness" was revived by Sting in 1982, when it reached the British Top 20.)

=== West End, British films and last years ===
Returning to England in 1932, although apparently spending time in California, Grey concentrated thereafter on the West End stage and British films. His screenplay for Rome Express (1932), a spy story, was "extremely popular in its day and virtually created a subgenre". He wrote more than twenty screenplays for British films, usually for the popular comedians of the day, but also including My Song Goes Round the World (1934), Mimi (1935), an adaptation of La Bohème, for Gertrude Lawrence and Douglas Fairbanks Jr. and Yes, Madam? (1940).

Throughout the decade Grey had shows running in the West End, written in collaboration with previous collaborators and new ones including Oscar Levant, Johnny Green and Noel Gay. Grey wrote more than 3,000 songs.

When the Second World War began, Grey joined the Entertainments National Service Association (ENSA), which took shows round the country and overseas to provide relief for serving members of the armed forces. In 1941 he was presenting a concert party in Ipswich, Suffolk, when the town was heavily bombed. Grey died two days later, aged 54, as a result of a heart attack, brought on by the bombing, and exacerbated by asthma. He is buried in Ipswich Old Cemetery.

=== Olympian bobsleigher myth ===
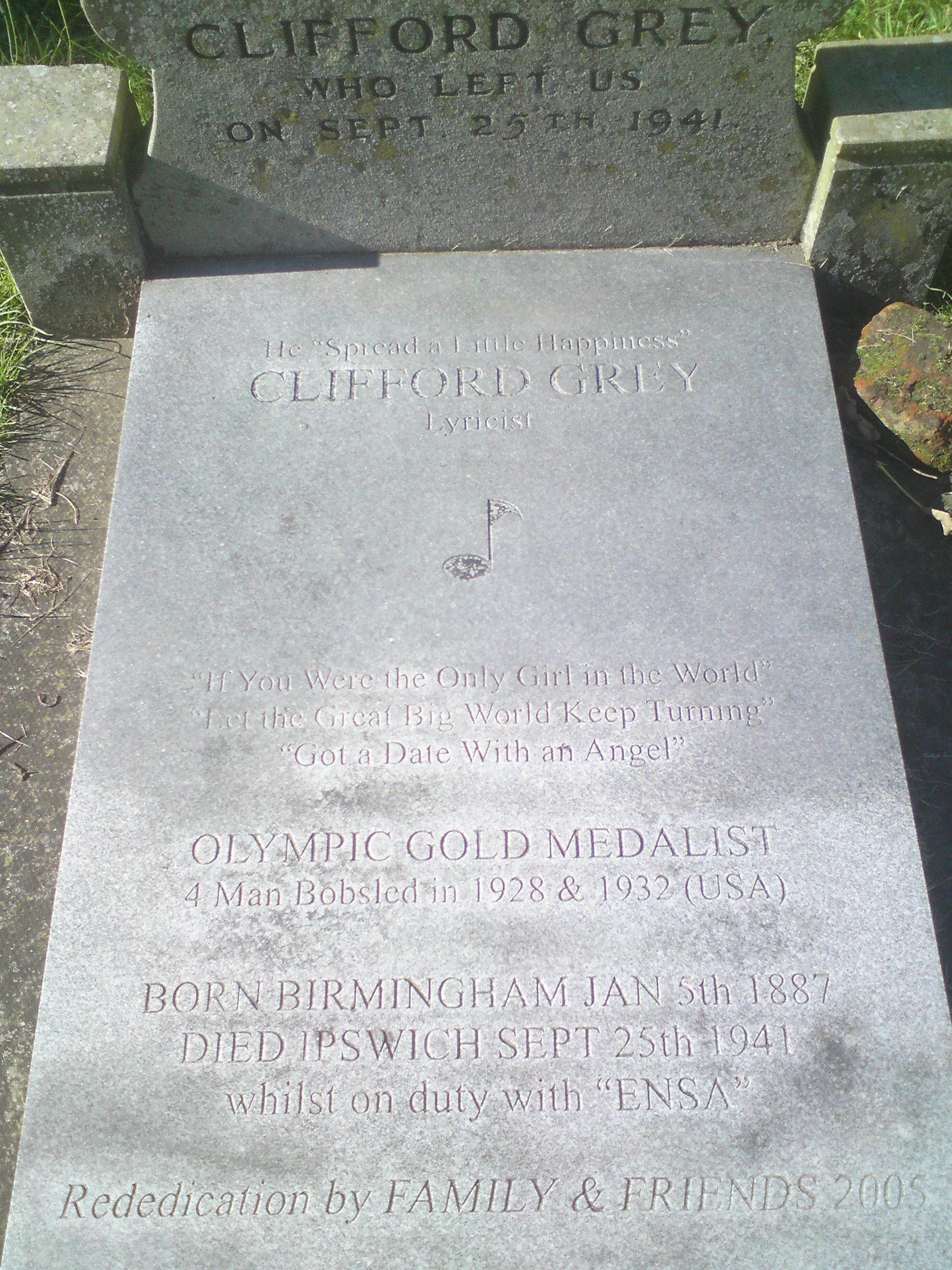
Inscription on the stone laid on Grey's grave in Old Ipswich Cemetery in 2005 including the erroneously attributed Olympic gold medals

After an article written in 1979 by an American journalist, Tim Clark, in Yankee Magazine, it was believed for more than three decades that Grey had competed, secretly, for the US Olympic bobsleigh team in 1928 and 1932 under the name Clifford "Tippy" (or "Tippi") Gray. Many news sources and biographers accepted this idea, based on circumstantial evidence that Clark had found. The evidence also persuaded Grey's daughters that their late father was not only the peripatetic writer that they remembered, but also a secret world-class sportsman who had been too modest to boast of his Olympic success. The press thereafter widely reported that Grey the librettist had also won a gold medal in the five-man bobsleigh race at the 1928 Winter Olympics in St. Moritz, another at the following Winter Olympics in Lake Placid, New York, this time in the four-man event, and a bronze medal in the four-man race at the 1937 FIBT World Championships in St. Moritz. In the Oxford Dictionary of National Biography the historian James Ross Moore concluded that during Grey's New York years:

Grey made many theatrical and sporting friends. Much later, the secret life of this quiet, retiring, and serious-looking man, so supposedly sedentary and shy behind his horn-rimmed glasses, was revealed. With considerable skill, Grey had invented an American persona, Tippi Gray, and it was under this name that he joined three bobsleighing friends and won gold medals in both the 1928 and the 1932 winter Olympic games.

There were a few who did not accept that "Tippi" Gray was the same person as Clifford Grey the writer. The Olympic historian David Wallechinsky was one, and John Cross, a researcher from Bowdoin College, was another. Finally, around 2013, Andy Bull, a sportswriter for The Guardian, was writing a book about the 1932 gold medal-winning bobsleigh team that was published in 2015 under the title Speed Kings. Although Bull had earlier accepted the story, as he looked closer, he became suspicious. He found an interview with "Tippy" Gray from 1948 in the Sarasota Herald-Tribune, seven years after Grey's death. "Tippy" Gray, the Olympic champion, died in April 1968 in San Diego, California. Bull wrote:

There are so many odd coincidences in the lives of the two men, it's easy to see now how their tales became tangled. ... [T]here was the physical resemblance, close enough for the two of them to be confused with each other in the grainy old black-and-white photos. Then ... "Tippy" Gray was a song-writer too. He had a short career in the movies, but killed his career when he was arrested in possession of an opium pipe and a pistol. After that, he moved to Paris and started writing jazz tunes for the revue at the Moulin Rouge.

== Musicals ==
- 1916 – Theodore & Co
- 1916 – The Kodak Girl
- 1917 – Arlette
- 1917 – Yes, Uncle!
- 1918 – The Girl Behind the Gun
- 1919 – Who's Hooper?
- 1919 – Baby Bunting
- 1919 – The Kiss Call
- 1920 – A Night Out
- 1920 – Kissing Time
- 1920 – Sally
- 1921 – Little Miss Raffles
- 1921 – The Co-Optimists
- 1922 – The Hotel Mouse
- 1922 – Phi-Phi (new English language lyrics from the French by Albert Willemetz)
- 1922 – The Smith Family
- 1923 – Lady Butterfly
- 1924 – Marjorie
- 1924 – Annie Dear
- 1925 – June Days
- 1925 – Sky High
- 1925 – Mayflowers
- 1926 – Patsy
- 1926 – Katja
- 1926 – Bubbling Over
- 1927 – Hit the Deck
- 1928 – The Madcap
- 1928 – Sunny Days
- 1928 – The Three Musketeers
- 1928 – Mr Cinders
- 1928 – Ups-a-Daisy
- 1930 – Smiles
- 1931 – For the Love of Mike
- 1932 – Out of the Bottle
- 1933 – He Wanted Adventure
- 1933 – Command Performance
- 1933 – Mr Whittington
- 1935 – Jack o'Diamonds
- 1935 – Love Laughs—!
- 1936 – At the Silver Swan
- 1937 – Oh! You Letty
- 1938 – Bobby Get Your Gun
- 1942 – Susie
- 1942 – Wild Rose

== Films ==
Sources that confused Grey with the bobsledder Gray stated that he acted in a dozen silent films from 1914 to 1922, but this was Gray, not Grey, the lyricist. Grey's lyrics, songs or screenplays were used in nearly 60 talking films:

- 1929 – Devil-May-Care – Songs
- 1929 – The Love Parade – Lyrics
- 1930 – Call of the Flesh – Songs
- 1930 – Madam Satan – Songs
- 1930 – The Florodora Girl – Songs
- 1931 – The Smiling Lieutenant – Lyrics
- 1932 – After the Ball – Lyricist
- 1932 – For the Love of Mike – Script
- 1932 – Lord Babs – Adaptation, dialogue and lyrics
- 1932 – Rome Express – Original story and dialogue
- 1932 – The Midshipmaid – Lyrics
- 1932 – There Goes the Bride – Lyrics
- 1933 – Facing the Music – Original story
- 1933 – King of the Ritz – Lyricist
- 1933 – No Funny Business – Lyricist
- 1933 – Sleeping Car – Lyrics
- 1933 – Soldiers of the King – Lyrics
- 1933 – The Song You Gave Me – Script
- 1933 – This Is the Life – Script
- 1933 – You Made Me Love You – Songs (words and music)
- 1934 – Doctor's Orders – Script
- 1934 – Girls Will Be Boys – Scenario and dialogue
- 1934 – Give Her a Ring – Adaptation, scenario and dialogue
- 1934 – Love at Second Sight – Music and lyrics
- 1934 – Mr Cinders – Adaptation, scenario and dialogue
- 1934 – My Song Goes Round the World – Adaptation and scenario
- 1934 – The Luck of a Sailor – Script
- 1935 – Brewster's Millions – Adaptation
- 1935 – Charing Cross Road – Script
- 1935 – Dandy Dick – Adaptation, scenario and dialogue
- 1935 – Drake of England – Additional dialogue
- 1935 – Heart's Desire – Lyrics
- 1935 – Invitation to the Waltz – Scenario and additional dialogue
- 1935 – Me and Marlborough – Musical numbers
- 1935 – Mimi – Scenario and dialogue
- 1935 – The Student's Romance – Adaptation and scenario
- 1935 – Things Are Looking Up – Title song
- 1936 – Accused – Lyrics
- 1936 – Land without Music – Lyrics
- 1936 – Queen of Hearts – Original screenplay
- 1936 – Southern Roses – Lyrics
- 1937 – Boys Will Be Girls – Script
- 1937 – Pearls Bring Tears – Story
- 1937 – Sing as You Swing – Screen story
- 1937 – The Lilac Domino – Lyrics
- 1938 – Luck of the Navy – Script
- 1938 – Premiere – Lyricist
- 1938 – Yes, Madam? – Screenplay
- 1939 – An Englishman's Home – Screenplay
- 1939 – Lucky to Me – Screenplay
- 1939 – She Couldn't Say No – Script
- 1939 – The Lambeth Walk – Continuity and additional scenes
- 1940 – Band Waggon – Song: "The only one who's difficult is you"
- 1940 – The Middle Watch – Screenplay
- 1941 – My Wife's Family – Screenplay
- 1948 – Sleeping Car to Trieste – Original story
- 1954 – Hit the Deck – Lyrics

== Notes, references and sources ==
=== Sources ===
- Jason, David (1975). P. G. Wodehouse: A Portrait of a Master. London: Garnstone Press. ISBN 978-0-85511-190-8.
- Wallenchinsky, David (1984). "Bobsled: Four-Man". The Complete Book of the Olympics: 1896–1980. Harmondsworth and New York: Penguin Books. ISBN 978-0-14-006632-6.
