= Theodore & Co =

Musical by H. M. Harwood and George Grossmith, Jr., premiered in 1916

- Duet for the Duke and Pony Twitchin
- Music: Ivor Novello and Jerome Kern
- Lyrics: Adrian Ross and Clifford Grey
- Book: H. M. Harwood and George Grossmith Jr.
- Basis: Théodore et Cie by Paul Armont and Nicolas Nancey
- Premiere: 19 September 1916: Gaiety Theatre
- Productions: 1916 London

Theodore & Co is an English musical comedy in two acts with a book by H. M. Harwood and George Grossmith Jr. based on the French comedy Théodore et Cie by Paul Armont and Nicolas Nancey, with music by Ivor Novello and Jerome Kern and lyrics by Adrian Ross and Clifford Grey. It was produced by Grossmith and Edward Laurillard and directed by Austen Hurgon, opening at the Gaiety Theatre on 19 September 1916 and running for 503 performances. It starred Grossmith, Fred Leslie and Leslie Henson.

Theodore & Co opened during World War I in the same year as two longest-running shows in London: Chu Chin Chow and The Bing Boys are Here, and the successful The Happy Day. Audiences wanted light and uplifting entertainment during the war, and these shows delivered it.

This show established Ivor Novello as a theatrical composer and was Kern's first show in London. Novello's songs from the show include "What A Duke Should Be" and "Oh, How I Want To Marry".

== Roles and original cast ==
Pony and Fudge

- Bompas, 24th Duke of Shetland – Davy Burnaby
- Pony Twitchen (of the "Crimson Comics") – Leslie Henson
- Rt. Hon. George Wye (Minister of Movies) – Fred Leslie
- Mr. Blissett (A Husband) – Frederick Morant
- Cosmo Legallos – Henri Leoni
- Mr. Satterthwaite (of Dowton) – Victor Gouriet
- Crump – Robert Nainby
- Delatour (Manager of the New Casino) – Frank Hector
- A Man with a Blue Envelope – Ralph Roberts
- The Emir of Baluchistan – J. Grande
- His Interpreter – Fred Raynham
- Sir Basil Bowlwell, R.H.G. – James Thomas
- Lord Theodore Wragge – George Grossmith Jr.
- Lady Theresa Wye – Gladys Homfrey
- Lady Pansy (the Duke's daughter) – Madge Saunders
- Hon. Sapphire Blissett – Julia James
- Fudge Robinson (of the "Crimson Comics") – Peggy Kurton
- Alma, "The Statue of Liberty " – Irene Richards
- Cleo, "The Tiptoe Queen" – Adrah Fair
- Lady Diana Camden – Ivey Collette/Doris Stocker
- Lady Moya – Violet Ashton
- Molly Pershore – Barbara Dunbar
- Marjorie Carstairs – Connie Guy
- Lady Lilly – Vera Davis
- Lady Billy – Lilian Caldicott
- Elizabeth Anne – Margaret Gamble
- Mary Ellen – Maudie Dunham
- Ethel Emily (Mr. Satterthwaite's daughter) – Joyce Barbour
- Rosa Maud (Mr. Satterthwaite's daughter) – Dorothy King
- Matilda Kate – Cherry Constant
- Harriett Jane – Mercia Swinburne
- Charwoman – Muriel Barney

== Musical numbers ==
Act I

- Chorus – "Isn't there a crowd everywhere" (Words by Adrian Ross. Music by Ivor Novello)
- Song – "What a Duke should be" (Words by Clifford Grey. Music by Novello)
- Duet – "I'll make myself at home" (Words by Ross. Music by Novello)
- Song – "I'm getting such a big girl now" (Words by Grey. Music by Philip Braham)
- Song & Dance – "Ev'ry little girl can teach me something new" (Words by Ross. Music by Novello)
- Song – "The Candy Girls" (Words by Ross. Music by Novello)
- Sextet – "You'd better not wait for him" (Words by Grey. Music by Novello)
- Finale, Act I. – "He's going to call on Baby Grand" (Music by Novello)

Act II

- Chorus – "We are Theodore & Co." (Words by Ross. Music by Novello)
- Song – "Three Hundred and Sixty-five days" (Words by Grey. Music by Jerome D. Kern)
- Song – "That 'Come hither' look" (Words by Grey. Music by Kern)
- Song " Any old where" (Words by Grey. Music by Novello)
- Song & Chorus – "The Casino Music Hall" (Words by Grey. Music by Kern)
- Dance – "Valse Saracenne" (Music by Novello)
- Song – "My friend John" (Words by Grey. Music by Novello)
- Duet – "All that I want is somebody to love me" (Words by Grey. Music by Kern)
- Finale (Music by Novello)

Supplementary song

- "My Second Childhood" (Words by David Burnaby & Eric Blore. Music by Braham)
