= Edward Laurillard =

Theatrical producer

Laurillard in 1915

Edward Laurillard (20 April 1870 – 7 May 1936) was a cinema and theatre producer in London and New York City during the first third of the 20th century. He is best remembered for promoting the cinema early in the 20th century and for Edwardian musical comedies produced in partnership with George Grossmith, Jr., including Tonight's the Night (1914), Theodore & Co (1916) and Yes, Uncle! (1917).

== Life and career ==
Born in Rotterdam in The Netherlands, he was educated at Osnabrück and in Paris. Laurillard moved to London, England as a young man. He was married and divorced twice.

=== Early career ===
In 1894, Laurillard became manager of Terry's Theatre, producing King Kodak, and his first big success was The Gay Parisienne at the Duke of York's Theatre, which introduced the hit song "Sister Mary Jane's Top Note." Other early productions included My Old Dutch and Oh! Susannah, after which he toured the United States. The Savoy Theatre in London, closed in 1903 after the D'Oyly Carte Opera Company discontinued producing its Savoy operas there, was reopened under the management of Laurillard in February 1904 with The Love Birds, by Raymond Rôze and Percy Greenbank, starring George Grossmith, Jr., who would later become Laurillard's producing partner.

During the First World War he became manager of the New Gallery Cinema in Regent Street and built a group of 25 cinemas. He screened Herbert Beerbohm Tree's film of Henry VIII, one of the first films of a big stage production. With Grossmith, he brought the ethnic comedy hit, Potash and Perlmutter by Montague Glass, to London in 1914 for a long run at the Queen's Theatre. He was then the manager of the Comedy Theatre for the production of Peg O' My Heart by John Hartley Manners. Grossmith and Laurillard opened Tonight's the Night, based on the farce Pink Dominoes, at the Shubert Theatre in New York in 1914, the first Gaiety show to be produced in New York before opening in London.

He then moved to the Gaiety Theatre in London in 1915. At the Prince of Wales Theatre, Grossmith and Laurillard had successes with Mr Manhattan (1916) and Yes, Uncle! (1917). At the Gaiety Theatre, Laurillard's biggest hit was Theodore & Co (1916). At that theatre, he later produced two shows in 1921: Faust on Toast, a burlesque starring Jack Buchanan, and Maurice Maeterlinck's play The Betrothal, featuring Bobbie Andrews and Gladys Cooper, with incidental music by Cecil Armstrong Gibbs and costumes by Charles Ricketts.

=== Later years ===
Laurillard, c. 1917

Grossmith and Laurillard leased the Shaftesbury Theatre to produce several shows from 1917 to 1921. These included Arlette (1917), Baby Bunting by Fred Thompson and Worton David (1919), The Great Lover, by Leo Ditrichstein, Frederic Hatton, and Fanny Hatton (1920), and Out to Win, by Roland Pertwee and Dion Clayton Calthrop (1921). At the Alhambra Theatre, they produced Oscar Asche and Dornford Yates's conception of Eastward Ho! in 1919.

The partners also purchased the Winter Garden Theatre in 1919, where they produced Kissing Time (1919, with a book by P. G. Wodehouse and Guy Bolton and music by Ivan Caryll) and A Night Out (1920). Grossmith and Laurillard also became managers of the Apollo Theatre in 1920 (they had produced The Only Girl there in 1916 and Tilly of Bloomsbury there in 1919), producing Trilby (1922), which was based on the 1894 George du Maurier novel of the same name, as well as Such a Nice Young Man by H.F. Maltby, among others over the next three years. After this, Grossmith and Laurillard terminated their partnership.

Other shows that Laurillard produced in the 1920s included The Naughty Princess, with a book by John Hastings Turner, lyrics by Adrian Ross, and music by Charles Cuvillier at the Adelphi Theatre (1920), Don 'Q', with words by Hesketh Hesketh-Prichard with and music by Charles Essen (1921), The Smith Family at the Empire Theatre in 1922 and The Butter and Egg Man at the Garrick Theatre in 1927.

The Piccadilly Theatre was built by Bertie Crewe and Edward A. Stone, for Laurillard's production company in 1928, opening with Blue Eyes, a romantic musical with music by Kern and book and lyrics by Bolton and Graham John.

Laurillard also brought to London Ralph Benatzky's My Sister and I (Meine Schwester und ich a.k.a. Meet My Sister) in 1931. In his last years, he moved to New York and also spent some time in Hollywood.
