= George Arthurs =

English composer and writer (1875–1944)

George Arthurs

George Arthurs (13 April 1875 – 14 March 1944) was an English songwriter, playwright, composer, author and screenwriter who contributed lyrics to several successful musical comedies such as The Belle of Mayfair (1906), Havana (1908) and Yes, Uncle! (1917), before writing dialogue for such films as The Yellow Mask (1931).

== Early life and songwriting ==
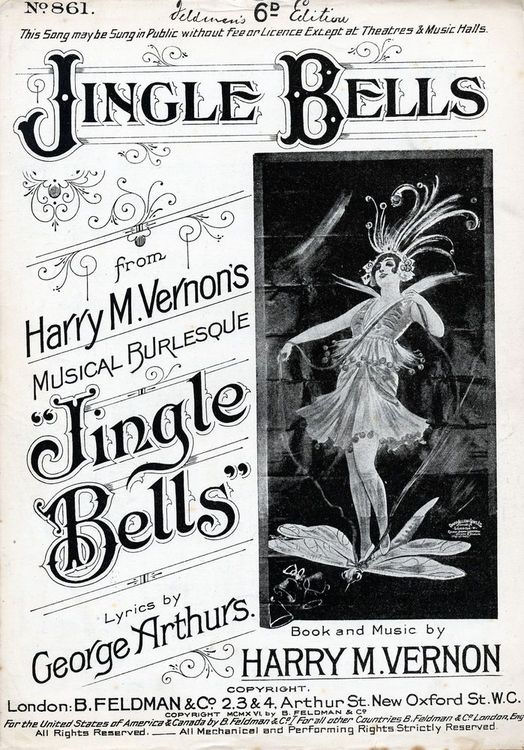
Sheet music for Jingle Bells with lyrics by Arthurs (1916)

Arthurs was born at Chorlton-cum-Hardy in Manchester in 1875, the son of John Arthurs, a commercial traveller, and Harriet Laurina née Savage. As a young man, Arthurs worked as an accountant in his native city, but at night he regularly visited the music halls where he got to know performers for whom he began to write jokes. Encouraged by his joke writing success, he began also to write songs for famous music hall artistes. Songs he wrote lyrics for at that time include "I Want to Sing In Opera", "The Wriggley Rag", "You’ve Got to Sing In Ragtime", "I Can't Reach That Top Note" and "Chrysanthemums", sung by the comedian Wilkie Bard; The humorous patter song "The English Language" for Wilson James, for which he wrote both the words and music; "Josh-u-a" written in 1910 with Bert Lee and made famous by Clarice Mayne; "The Caddie", sung by Neil Kenyon; "A Different Girl Again" and "If the World Were Ruled by Girls" for Whit Cunliffe. He wrote the words to music by Louis Hirsch for the song "The Red, White and Blue" sung by Henri Leoni in the revue Business As Usual. In 1914 Arthurs and Fred Godfrey wrote "Be Sure He’s Irish" and "Up He Goes In His Little Monoplane" for Ella Retford; and Arthurs and Fred W. Leigh wrote "A Little of What You Fancy Does You Good" sung by Marie Lloyd. For the musical revue Jingle Bells (1916) he wrote the words to the title song.

== Musical theatre ==
Arthurs moved into musical theatre, writing lyrics for such shows as The Belle of Mayfair (1906) and Havana (1908), before collaborating with composer Louis Hirsch on the revue Hullo, Tango (1913). He wrote the book and lyrics for Honeymoon Express (1914) before working on such revues and musicals as The Whirl of the Town (1914), The Million Dollar Girl (1915), Don’t Tempt Me (1915), She's a Daisy (1915) to a score by Louis Jerome, We’re All In It (1916), Seeing Life (1917) and Hanky Panky (1917). He contributed to the musical comedies Suzette (1917), Arlette (1917), Yes, Uncle! (1917), and The Girl for the Boy (1919; book by Austen Hurgon, score by Percy Greenbank). Arthurs also contributed lyrics for a Broadway revival of Florodora (1920), and for Peri, The Slave of Love (1921), Many Happy Returns (1922), Archie (1924), Belles of Britain (1925), Pastimes (1926), and Patsy from Paris (1926). In 1930 he collaborated once again with Fred Godfrey on the song The Christening of the Baby Doll.

== Films ==
Arthurs wrote dialogue for the 1931 film The Yellow Mask. The films Their Night Out (1933) and Marry the Girl (1935) were based on original plays by Arthurs and Arthur H. Miller, the latter on the 1930 farce Marry the Girl.

== Personal life and death ==
Arthurs married Lyra Jane Rense White (1878–1944) on 17 August 1903 at St Paul's Church, Parish of Hammersmith, London, England, and the couple had a son, Francis William George (1910–1976) and two daughters, Margery Pearl (1906–1989) and Muriel Isobel (1910–1963) (twin of Francis). In 1939, Arthurs and his wife were living at 21 Surrey Road in Harrow, Middlesex. He died in Harrow on 14 March 1944 aged 68 and was cremated on 17 March 1944 at Golders Green Crematorium, London.
