= Madge Elliott =

Australian dancer and actress

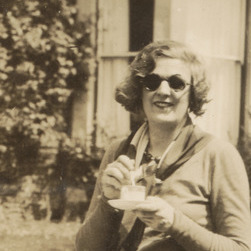
- Born: Leah Madeleine Elliott; 12 May 1896; Fulham, London, England
- Died: 8 August 1955 (aged 59); New York City, U.S.
- Occupations: Actress, dancer
- Known for: Dancing in the UK and Australia
- Spouse: Cyril Ritchard (m. 1935)
- Children: one son (died as an infant)

Leah Madeleine "Madge" Elliott (12 May 1896 – 8 August 1955) was a UK-born Australian dancer and actor who was the wife and stage partner of Cyril Ritchard.

== Life ==
Elliott was born in Fulham, London, in 1896. Her family emigrated to Australia while she was a young child. Her mother, Frances Selina Curtis (née Heighton), and her father, Nicholas Phillipps Elliott, lived in Toowoomba, Queensland, where her father was a surgeon. She was educated at a local grammar school.

After Elliott's family had moved to Sydney, she was trained as a dancer by Minnie Hooper. She was a member of the children's ballet at the Melba-Williamson Opera Company by 1911. Hooper tried to partner Elliott with Cyril Ritchard, a handsome actor, but Elliott thought Ritchard's dancing too poor for him to be an appropriate colleague. Nevertheless, they did subsequently form a duo, "Madge and Cyril", and went on a tour of New Zealand.

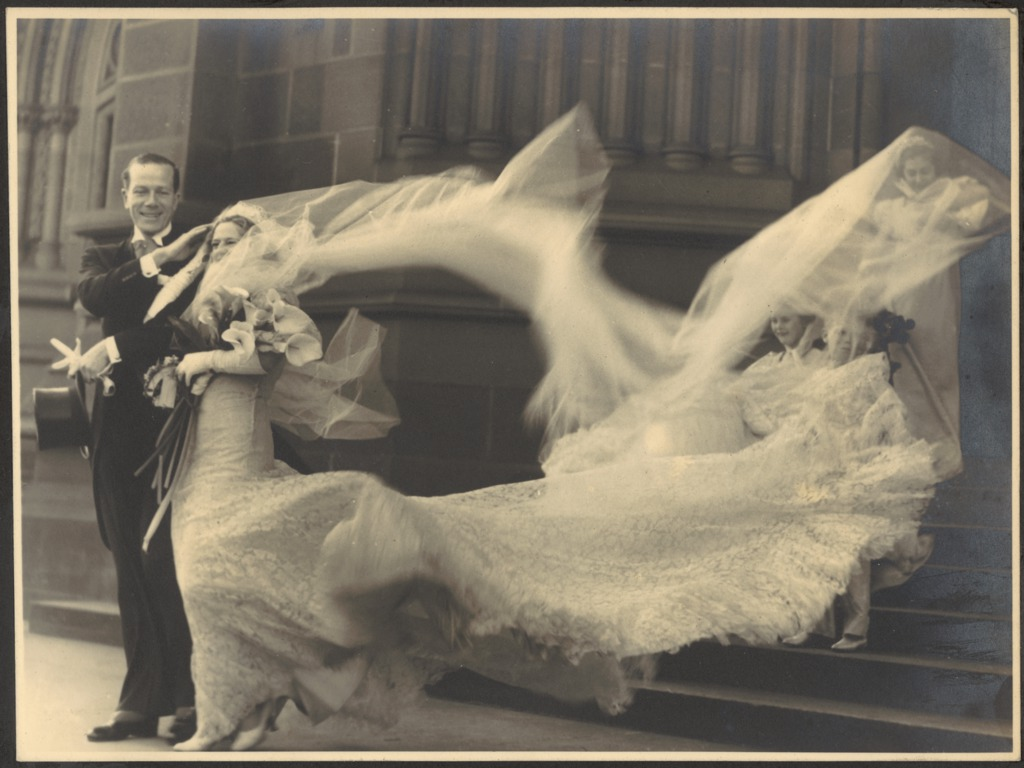
Wind catches the bride's veil and train at Cyril and Madge's wedding, 16 September 1935

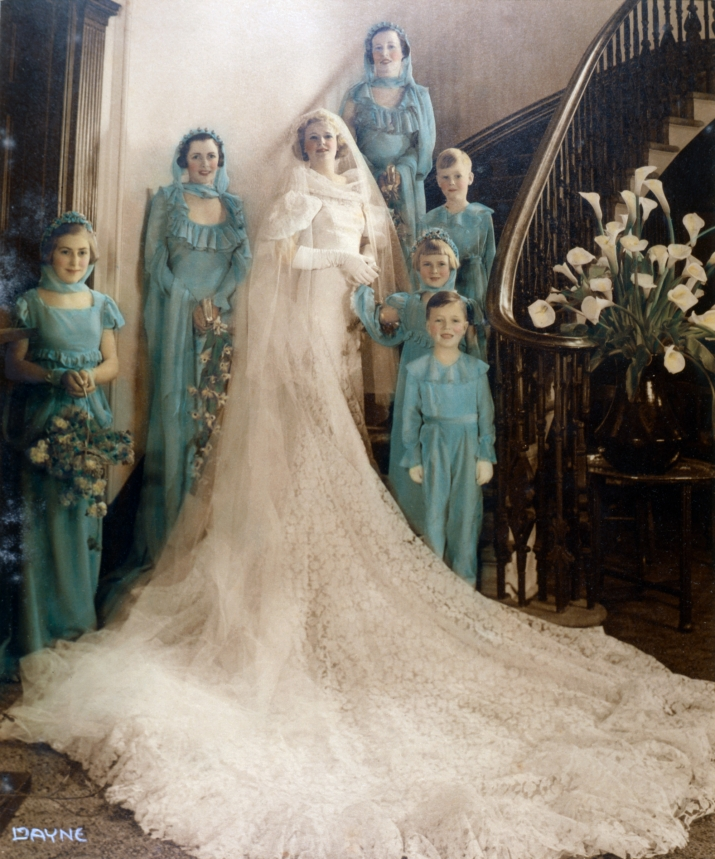
Madge Elliott in her Peter Russell gown, "the finest ever worn in Australia"

In 1918, they appeared together in Yes, Uncle! and Going Up, but then briefly pursued their careers independently. Ritchard worked in New York, where he shared an apartment with Walter Pidgeon, while Elliott relocated to London, making her West End debut in 1925. When they resumed their partnership, it was in London where they reunited: in 1927, Laddie Cliff booked them to star in Lady Luck at the Carlton Theatre.

Elliott and Ritchard returned to Australia in 1932. They appeared together in several successful musical productions, notably Blue Roses.

Elliott and Ritchard married at St Mary's Cathedral, Sydney, on 16 September 1935. There were said to be five thousand onlookers at the wedding, with Elliott's four-yard veil attracting especial attention.

Elliott died of bone cancer in Lenox Hill Hospital, New York City, in 1955.
