= Cyril Ritchard =

Australian actor (1898–1977)

- Ritchard (left) and Eddie Mayehoff in the play Visit to a Small Planet (1957)
- Born: Cyril Joseph Trimnell-Ritchard; 1 December 1898; Surry Hills, Sydney, New South Wales, Australia
- Died: 18 December 1977 (aged 79); Chicago, Illinois, U.S.
- Occupation: Actor
- Years active: 1918–1977
- Spouse: Madge Elliott

Cyril Joseph Trimnell-Ritchard (1 December 1898 – 18 December 1977), known professionally as Cyril Ritchard, was an Australian stage, screen and television actor, and director. He is best remembered today for his performance as Captain Hook in the Mary Martin musical production of Peter Pan. In 1945, he played Gabriel Eisenstein in Gay Rosalinda at the Palace theatre in London, a version of Strauss's Die Fledermaus by Erich Wolfgang Korngold in which he appeared with Peter Graves, 8th Baron Graves. The show was conducted by Richard Tauber and ran for almost a year.

== Life and career ==
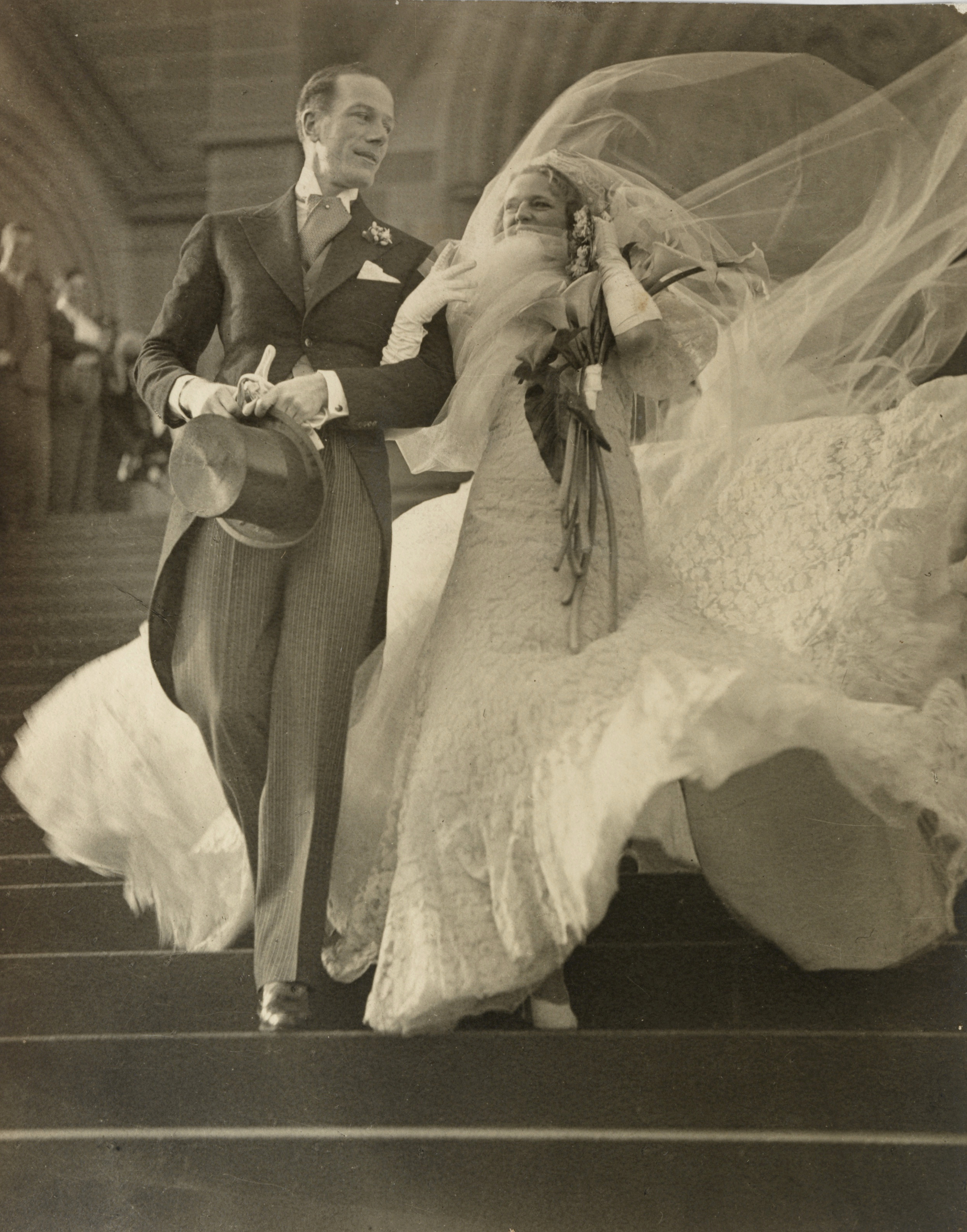
Wedding of Madge Elliott and Cyril Ritchard at St Mary’s Cathedral, Sydney, 1935

Ritchard was born in the Sydney suburb of Surry Hills, one of five siblings born to Sydney-born parents: Herbert Trimnell-Ritchard, a Protestant grocer, and Margaret, sometimes called "Marguerite" (née Collins), a Roman Catholic, in whose faith the children were raised. Educated by the Jesuits at St Aloysius' College, Cyril studied medicine at the University of Sydney until he abandoned his medical career in 1917 and decided to become an actor.

Dance teacher Minnie Hooper suggested Ritchard team up with one of her dancers, Madge Elliott, but Madge rejected him because he couldn't dance. Two years later, after a practice waltz, Madge and Cyril realised they were a team, and they went on a dancing tour of New Zealand.

Madge and Cyril appeared in Yes, Uncle! and Going Up, both in 1918. They then went their separate ways. Ritchard shared an apartment with Walter Pidgeon in New York while he appeared there, and Madge made her first West End appearance in 1925. Ritchard joined her in London and they reestablished the dancing partnership. In 1927 Laddie Cliff booked them to star in Lady Luck at the Carlton Theatre in 1927.

In 1932 they returned to Australia where they were a hit. They appeared in a number of musicals, including Blue Roses. Their swan song performance in Australia was their wedding ceremony at St Mary's Cathedral, Sydney, in September 1935. There were said to be 5,000 onlookers at the wedding; Madge's four-yard £400 veil had a starring role.

== Peter Pan ==
Ritchard achieved star status in 1954 as Captain Hook in the Broadway production of Peter Pan starring Mary Martin, who shared the same birthday as Ritchard (1 December). For his work in the show, he received a Tony Award as Best Featured Actor in a Musical.

Both Ritchard and Martin starred in the NBC television productions of the musical, beginning with a live colour telecast in 1955. The television version was well-received, and Ritchard reprised his role in 1956 and 1960.

His voice was known to a generation in the 1950s via his LP vinyl disc narration of Prokofiev's "Peter and the Wolf" performed with the Philadelphia Orchestra conducted by the legendary Eugene Ormandy. CBS CORONET Masterworks KLC 633 (in editor's possession)

== Additional Roles ==
He appeared as Kreton in Gore Vidal's play Visit to a Small Planet as well as also directed it, which also starred Eddie Mayehoff. The play had tryouts at the Shubert Theatre in New Haven, Connecticut January 16–19, 1957. On Broadway, it debuted on February 7, 1957, and ran for 388 performances. Ritchard received a Tony Award nomination for his performance as Kreton. (Under Ritchard's direction, Mayehoff also received a nomination for Best Performance by a Featured Actor.)

In 1958, he starred in the Cole Porter CBS television musical Aladdin. In 1959, he was nominated for a second Tony Award, for Best Actor in a Play, for The Pleasure of His Company.

He appeared onstage in The Roar of the Greasepaint – The Smell of the Crowd (1965), with Anthony Newley, and played Osgood Fielding in Sugar (1972). He was also a Broadway director: The Heavenly Twins (1955), The Happiest Girl in the World (1961) (in which he also appeared), Roar Like a Dove (1964) and The Irregular Verb to Love (1963) (in which he also appeared).

His film appearances include the role of Crewe, the artist in Alfred Hitchcock's first talkie Blackmail (1929), E.A. Dupont's Piccadilly (1929), the George Formby comedy I See Ice (1937) and the Tommy Steele musical Half a Sixpence (1967).

Ritchard also appeared regularly on a variety of television programs in the late 1950s and 1960s. For example, he appeared as a mystery guest on What's My Line? on the 22 December 1957 episode of the popular Sunday night CBS-TV program. From 1956 to 1971 Ritchard played the comic villain in Jacques Offenbach's operetta La Perichole with the Metropolitan Opera, first at the opera house in New York City and later on tour; Ritchard directed the production. He also served as a guest panelist on the Met's radio quiz show, where he was referred to as Sir Cyril, although he was never knighted. His wife, Madge Elliott, died of cancer in 1955 in New York.

== Death ==
Ritchard’s final part was as Elrond in the Rankin/Bass television production of The Hobbit.

He later suffered a heart attack while working as narrator in the Chicago touring company of Side by Side by Sondheim. He died on 18 December 1977 in Chicago, aged 79. He was buried beside his wife at Saint Mary's Cemetery in Ridgefield, Connecticut, near his rural home. His funeral mass was celebrated by Archbishop Fulton Sheen. The altar server was John H. Frey. He and Madge had no children, save for a baby boy who died in 1939.

== Filmography ==
- Piccadilly (1929) as Victor Smiles
- Blackmail (1929, directed by Alfred Hitchcock) as The Artist
- Just for a Song (1930) as Craddock
- Symphony in Two Flats (1930) as Leo Chavasse
- Service for Ladies (1932) as Sir William Carter (uncredited)
- Danny Boy (1934) as John Martin
- The Show Goes On (1937) as Jimmy
- It's a Grand Old World (1937) as Brain
- I See Ice (1938) as Paul Martine
- Dangerous Medicine (1938) as Dr. Noel Penwood
- The Winslow Boy (1948) as Cyril Ritchard
- Woman Hater (1948) as Reveller (uncredited)
- The Dangerous Christmas of Red Riding Hood (1965, TV movie) as The Big Bad Wolf
- The Daydreamer (1966) as The Sandman (voice)
- Half a Sixpence (1967) as Harry Chitterlow
- Hans Brinker (1969, TV movie) as Mijnheer Kleef
- The Enchanted World of Danny Kaye: The Emperor's New Clothes (1972, TV movie) as Emperor Klockenlocher (voice)
- Tubby the Tuba (1975) as The Frog (voice)
- Captain Kangaroo (1975) as a World Traveler
- The First Christmas: The Story of the First Christmas Snow (1975, TV short) as Father Thomas (voice)
- The Hobbit (1977, TV movie) as Elrond (voice, final film role)

== Radio appearances ==
Year	Program	Episode/source
1952	Theatre Guild on the Air	The Pickwick Papers
