= List of songs with lyrics by P. G. Wodehouse =

This list contains songs with lyrics written or co-written by the English humorist, novelist and playwright P. G. Wodehouse.

Song title	Additional writers	Musical debut	Musical	Notes
Act One Finale (from Sitting Pretty)	Jerome Kern	1924	Sitting Pretty	
Act One Finale (from The Three Musketeers)	Rudolph Friml; Clifford Grey	1928	The Three Musketeers	
All For One	Rudolph Friml; Clifford Grey	1928	The Three Musketeers	
The Actor's Life	Rudolph Friml; Clifford Grey	1928	The Three Musketeers	
All Full of Talk	Jerome Kern	1916	Miss Springtime	
All You Need Is a Girl	Jerome Kern; Guy Bolton	1924	Sitting Pretty	
Ask Dad	Louis Hirsch; Guy Bolton	1918	Oh, My Dear!	
Back To the Dear Old Trenches	Ivan Caryll	1918	The Girl Behind the Gun	
Beauty Prize	Jerome Kern; George Grossmith, Jr.	Unknown	--	
Behind the Scenes	Jerome Kern	1906	The Beauty of Bath	Included in the libretto but not in the vocal score and may not have been used.
Bill	Jerome Kern; Oscar Hammerstein II	1918; 1927; 1986	Oh, Lady! Lady!! Show Boat; Jerome Kern Goes to Hollywood	
Bless My Soul	Rudolph Friml; Clifford Grey	1928	The Three Musketeers	
Bongo on the Congo	Jerome Kern; Guy Bolton	1924	Sitting Pretty	
Breakfast in Bed	Armand Vecsey; Guy Bolton	1927	The Nightingale	
Bright Lights	Jerome Kern; Schuyler Green	1917	Have a Heart	
Broken Blossoms	Armand Vecsey	1919	The Rose of China	
Bunny Dear	Armand Vecsey	1919	The Rose of China	
Cabaret Girl	Jerome Kern; Anne Caldwell; George Grossmith, Jr.	Unknown	--	
Calico	Herbert Haines; Charles H. Taylor	1907	My Darling	
Carnival of Fools	Rudolph Friml; Clifford Grey	1928	The Three Musketeers	
The Charity Class	Jerome Kern; Guy Bolton	1924	Sitting Pretty	
The Chase	Rudolph Friml; Clifford Grey	1928	The Three Musketeers	
Childhood Days	Louis Hirsch; Guy Bolton	1918	Oh, My Dear!	
The Church Round the Corner	Jerome Kern; Clifford Grey	1920	Sally	
Cleopatra	Jerome Kern; Clifford Grey	1920	Sally	
Cleopatterer	Jerome Kern; Guy Bolton	1917	Leave It to Jane	
College Spirit	Armand Vecsey	1919	The Rose of China	
Come Where Nature Calls	Louis Hirsch; Guy Bolton	1918	Oh, My Dear!	
Comin' Thru the Rye	Armand Vecsey; Guy Bolton	1927	The Nightingale	
Come to Me	Emmerich Kálmán; Herbert Reynolds	unknown	--	
Come to Us	Rudolph Friml; Clifford Grey	1928	The Three Musketeers	
A Cottage in Kent	Jerome Kern; George Grossmith, Jr.	1923	The Beauty Prize	
The Crickets Are Calling	Jerome Kern; Guy Bolton	1917	Leave It to Jane	
Daisy	Jerome Kern	1917	Have a Heart	
Days Gone By	Jerome Kern; Guy Bolton	1924	Sitting Pretty	
Dear Little Girl	Jerome Kern; Clifford Grey	1920	Sally	
Dear Old Fashioned Prison of Mine	Jerome Kern; Guy Bolton	1924	Sitting Pretty	
A Desert Island	Jerome Kern; Guy Bolton	1924	Sitting Pretty	
Down Here in Greenwich Village	Jerome Kern; Clifford Grey	1920	Sally	
Down on the Banks of the Subway	Armand Vecsey	1919	The Rose of China	
Dreams	Rudolph Friml; Clifford Grey	1928	The Three Musketeers	
The Enchanted Train	Jerome Kern	1924	Sitting Pretty	
Every Day	Jerome Kern	Unknown	--	
Fairyland	Armand Vecsey; Guy Bolton	1927	The Nightingale	
The Fall of Man	Emmerich Kálmán	1917	The Riviera Girl	
Finale (from Sally)	Jerome Kern; Clifford Grey	1920	Sally	
Finale (from The Three Musketeers)	Rudolph Friml; Clifford Grey	1928	The Three Musketeers	
Finale Act One (from Leave It to Jane)	Jerome Kern; Guy Bolton	1917	Leave It to Jane	
Finale Act Two (from Leave It to Jane)	Jerome Kern; Guy Bolton	1917	Leave It to Jane	
Finale Ultimo	George Gershwin; Jerome Kern	1924	Sitting Pretty	
The First Day of May	Jerome Kern; Guy Bolton	1917	Oh, Boy!	
First Rose of Summer	Jerome Kern; Anne Caldwell	Unknown	--	
Flags of Allies	Ivan Caryll; Guy Bolton	1918	The Girl Behind the Gun	
Flubby Dub, the Cave-Man	Jerome Kern; Guy Bolton	1917	Oh, Boy!	
Football Song	Jerome Kern; Guy Bolton	1917	Leave It to Jane	
For the Man I Love	Jerome Kern; George Grossmith, Jr.	1923	The Beauty Prize	
The Frolic of a Breeze	F. Clifford Harris	1906	The Beauty of Bath	
Gascony Bred	Rudolph Friml; Clifford Grey	1928	The Three Musketeers	
The Girl Behind the Gun	Ivan Caryll; Guy Bolton	1918	The Girl Behind the Gun	
The Glow Worm	Herbert Haines	1907	My Darling	
Godsons and Grandmothers	Ivan Caryll; Guy Bolton	1918	The Girl Behind the Gun	
Go Little Boat	Jerome Kern	1917; 1918	Miss 1917; Oh, My Dear	
Good Old Atwater	Jerome Kern	1917	Leave It to Jane	
Gossip	Rudolph Friml; Clifford Grey	1928	The Three Musketeers	
Greenwich Village	Jerome Kern	1918	Oh, Lady! Lady!!	
Gypsy Bring Your Fiddle	Emmerich Kálmán	1917	The Riviera Girl	
Half A Married Man	Emmerich Kálmán	1917	The Riviera Girl	
Happy Family	Ivan Caryll; Guy Bolton	1918	The Girl Behind the Gun	
He Doesn't Know	Armand Vecsey; Guy Bolton	1927	The Nightingale	
Here They are	George Gershwin; Ira Gershwin	1928	Rosalie	
Home from Oh Kay	George Gershwin; Guy Bolton	Unknown	--	
Homeland	Armand Vecsey; Guy Bolton	1927	The Nightingale	
Honeymoon Inn	Jerome Kern	1917; 1977	Have a Heart; Very Good Eddie	
Honeymoon Isle	Jerome Kern; George Grossmith, Jr.	1923	The Beauty Prize	
(Oh,) How Warm It is Today	Ivan Caryll; Guy Bolton	1918	The Girl Behind the Gun	
Hussars March	Sigmund Romberg	1928	Rosalie	
Hymn to the Sun	Armand Vecsey	1919	The Rose of China	
(And) I Am All Alone	Jerome Kern	1917	Have a Heart	
I Like It	Ivan Caryll; Guy Bolton	1918	The Girl Behind the Gun	
I Never Knew	Jean Schwartz	1918	See You Later #2	
I Shall Be All Right Now	Louis Hirsch; Guy Bolton	1918	Oh, My Dear!	
I Wonder Whether (I've Loved You All My Life)	Louis Hirsch; Guy Bolton	1918	Oh, My Dear!	
If Ever I Lost You	Ivor Novello	1921	The Golden Moth	
I'd Ask No More	Louis Hirsch; Guy Bolton	1918	Oh, My Dear!	
I'm a Prize	Jerome Kern; George Grossmith, Jr.	1923	The Beauty Prize	
I'm Here, Little Girl, I'm Here	Jerome Kern; Schuyler Green	1917	Have a Heart	
I'm Going To Find a Girl	Jerome Kern; Guy Bolton	1917	Leave It to Jane	
I'm So Busy	Jerome Kern; Schuyler Green	1917	Have a Heart	
I'm the Old Man in the Moon	Jerome Kern	Unknown	--	
In The Garden of Romance	Emmerich Kálmán; Herbert Reynolds	1916	Miss Springtime	
It's a Great Big Land	Jerome Kern; Guy Bolton	1917	Leave It to Jane	
It's a Hard Hard World for a Man	Jerome Kern	1918	Oh, Lady! Lady!!	
It's A Long, Long Day	Jerome Kern; George Grossmith, Jr.	1923	The Beauty Prize	
I've Had My Share (I Don't Care)	Jerome Kern; Guy Bolton	1917	Leave It to Jane	
I've Played For You	Jerome Kern; Guy Bolton	1917	Leave It to Jane	
Josephine	Armand Vecsey; Guy Bolton	1927	The Nightingale	
Joy Bells	Jerome Kern	1923	The Beauty Prize	
Just a Voice to Call Me Dear	Emmerich Kálmán	1917	The Riviera Girl	
Just You Watch My Step	Jerome Kern; Guy Bolton	1917	Leave It to Jane	
Koo-La-Loo	Jerome Kern; Guy Bolton	1917	Oh, Boy!	
L'Amour Toujours-L'Amour	Rudolph Friml; Clifford Grey	1928	The Three Musketeers	
Land Where Journeys End (and Dreams Come True)	Louis Hirsch	Unknown	--	
Land where the Good Songs Go	Jerome Kern	Unknown	--	
Leave It To Jane	Jerome Kern; Guy Bolton	1917	Leave It to Jane	
The Legend of the Tea Tree	Armand Vecsey	1919	The Rose of China	
Let's Make a Night of It	Jerome Kern; Guy Bolton	1917	Oh, Boy!	
Life in the Old Dog Yet	Ivan Caryll; Guy Bolton	1918	The Girl Behind the Gun	
Life Is a Game of Bluff	Emmerich Kálmán; Herbert Reynolds	1916	Miss Springtime	
Life's a Tale	Emmerich Kálmán	1917	The Riviera Girl	
Lilt of a Gypsy Strain	Emmerich Kálmán	Unknown	--	
A Little Bid for Sympathy	Emmerich Kálmán; Herbert Reynolds	1916	Miss Springtime	
A Little Bit of Ribbon	Jerome Kern; Guy Bolton	1917	Oh, Boy!	
Little Bride	Armand Vecsey	1919	The Rose of China	
A Little Bungalow in Quoque	Jerome Kern	1917; 1920; 1977	The Riviera Girl; Sally; Very Good Eddie	
A Little Country Mouse	Emmerich Kálmán; Herbert Reynolds	1916	Miss Springtime	
Look for the Silver Lining	Jerome Kern; Clifford Grey	1920	Sally	
The Love Monopoly	Emmerich Kálmán; Herbert Reynolds	1916	Miss Springtime	
The Magic Train	Jerome Kern; Guy Bolton	1924	Sitting Pretty	
Man, Man, Man	Emmerich Kálmán	1917	The Riviera Girl	
March of the Musketeers	Rudolf Friml; Clifford Grey	1928	The Three Musketeers	
May Moon	Armand Vecsey; Guy Bolton	1927	The Nightingale	
Meet Me Down on Main Street	Jerome Kern; George Grossmith, Jr.	1923	The Beauty Prize	
Moon Love	Jerome Kern; George Grossmith, Jr.	1923	The Beauty Prize	
Moon Song	Jerome Kern	1918	Oh, Lady! Lady!!	
Mr. and Mrs. Rorer	Jerome Kern; Guy Bolton	1924	Sitting Pretty	
My Belle	Rudolph Friml; Clifford Grey	1928	The Three Musketeers	
My Castle in the Air	Jerome Kern	1916	Miss Springtime	
My China Rose	Armand Vecsey	1919	The Rose of China	
My Sword And I	Rudolph Friml; Clifford Grey	1928	The Three Musketeers	
My Wife - My Man	Jerome Kern; Schuyler Green	1917	Have a Heart	
Napoleon	Jerome Kern	1917	Have a Heart	
Nerves	Jean Schwartz; Guy Bolton	1922	The Cabaret Girl	
Nesting Time (in Flatbush)	Jerome Kern	1917	Oh, Boy!	
New York Serenade	George Gershwin; Ira Gershwin	1928	Rosalie	
Non-Stop Dancing	Jerome Kern	1923	The Beauty Prize	
Now That My Ship's Come Home	Guy Jones	1907	The Gay Gordons	
Nuts in May	Ivor Novello	1921	The Golden Moth	
Oh Gee Oh Joy	George Gershwin; Ira Gershwin	1928	Rosalie	
Oh, Mr Chamberlain!	Jerome Kern	1906	The Beauty of Bath	Rewritten version of a Kern song from The Catch of the Season (1905)
Oh, My Dear!	Louis Hirsch; Guy Bolton	1918	Oh, My Dear!	
Oh, Daddy Please	Jerome Kern; Guy Bolton	1917	Oh, Boy!	
Oh, Lady! Lady!!	Jerome Kern	1918	Oh, Lady! Lady!!	
The Old-Fashioned Drama	Emmerich Kálmán; Herbert Reynolds	1916	Miss Springtime	
An Old-Fashioned Wife	Jerome Kern; Guy Bolton	1917	Oh, Boy!	
On a Desert Island With You	Jerome Kern	1924	Sitting Pretty	
Once In September	Armand Vecsey; Guy Bolton	1927	The Nightingale	
Once Upon a Time	Emmerich Kálmán; Herbert Reynolds	1916	Miss Springtime	
Only A Rose	Rudolph Friml; Clifford Grey	1928	The Three Musketeers	
Opening Act 1 Appendix (Pergola Patrol)	Jerome Kern; Anne Caldwell; George Grossmith, Jr.	Unknown	--	
Opening Act Two (from Leave It to Jane)	Jerome Kern; Guy Bolton	1917	Leave It to Jane	
Overture (from Leave It to Jane)	Jerome Kern; Guy Bolton	1917	Leave It to Jane	
Our Chinese Bungalow	Armand Vecsey; Oscar Shaw	1919	The Rose of China	
Our City of Dreams	Louis Hirsch; Guy Bolton	1918	Oh, My Dear!	
A Package of Seeds	Jerome Kern; Herbert Reynolds	1915; 1917	Ninety in the Shade; Oh, Boy!	
A Pal Like You (We're Going to Be Pals)	Jerome Kern; Guy Bolton	1917	Oh, Boy!	
A Pal Like You	Jerome Kern	Unknown	--	Also known as (I Was Looking For) A Pal Like You
A Peach of a Life	Jerome Kern; Guy Bolton	1917	Leave It to Jane	Also known as Life of a Peach
Peter Pan	Jerome Kern; Schuyler Green	1917	Have a Heart	
Phoebe Snow	Louis Hirsch; Guy Bolton	1918	Oh, My Dear!	
Play Out Music (from Leave It to Jane)	Jerome Kern; Guy Bolton	1917	Leave It to Jane	
The Polka Dot	Jerome Kern; Guy Bolton	1924	Sitting Pretty	
Poor Prune	Jerome Kern	1917	Leave It to Jane	
Prologue (from The Three Musketeers)	Rudolph Friml; Clifford Grey	1928	The Three Musketeers	
Proposals	Armand Vecsey	1919	The Rose of China	
Put Me in My Little Cell	Frederick Rosse	1904	Sergeant Brue	Not included in the published score or libretto; published separately.
Reaching for Stars	Jerome Kern; Clifford Grey	1920	Sally	
Riviera Girl	Emmerich Kálmán; Bela Jenbach; Leo Stein	Unknown	--	
The Road That Lies Before	Jerome Kern	1917	Have a Heart	
Rolled into One	Jerome Kern; Guy Bolton	1917	Oh, Boy!	
Sally Selection	Jerome Kern; Buddy DeSylva; Clifford Grey; Anne Caldwell	Unknown	--	
Samarkand	Jerome Kern; Schuyler Green	1917	Have a Heart	
Saturday Night	Jerome Kern	Unknown	--	
Say So	George Gershwin; Ira Gershwin	1928	Rosalie	
Shadow of the Moon	Jerome Kern; Guy Bolton	1924	Sitting Pretty	
Shimmy With Me	Jerome Kern	1922; 2003	The Cabaret Girl; Never Gonna Dance	
Shop	Jerome Kern; Schuyler Green	1917	Have a Heart	
Shufflin' Sam	Jerome Kern	1924	Sitting Pretty	
The Siren Song	Jerome Kern; Clifford Grey	1920	Sally	
The Siren's Song	Jerome Kern; Guy Bolton	1917	Leave It to Jane	
Sir Galahad	Jerome Kern; Guy Bolton	1917	Leave It to Jane	
Sitting Pretty	Jerome Kern	1924	Sitting Pretty	
Some Day Waiting Will End	Ivan Caryll	1918	The Girl Behind the Gun	
Some One	Jerome Kern; Herbert Reynolds	1916	Miss Springtime	
Sometimes I Feel Just Like Grandpa	Emmerich Kálmán	1917	The Riviera Girl	
The Spirit of the Drum	Armand Vecsey	1919	The Rose of China	
The Sun Shines Brighter	Jerome Kern; Guy Bolton	1917	Leave It to Jane	
Sunrise	Emmerich Kálmán; Herbert Reynolds	1916	Miss Springtime	
Sweet Sweet	George Gershwin; Ira Gershwin	Unknown	--	
That's What Men are For	Ivan Caryll	1918	The Canary	
Tell Me All Your Troubles, Cutie	Jerome Kern	1917	Miss 1917	
There Isn't One Girl	Jerome Kern	1924	Sitting Pretty	
There It Is Again	Jerome Kern; Guy Bolton	1917	Leave It to Jane	
There'll Never Be Another Girl Like Daisy	Emmerich Kálmán	1917	The Riviera Girl	
There's a Light in your Eyes	Ivan Caryll	1918	The Girl Behind the Gun	
There's a Toast	Emmerich Kálmán; Herbert Reynolds	Unknown	--	
This is the Existence	Emmerich Kálmán; Herbert Reynolds	1916	Miss Springtime	
Thousands of Years Ago	Ivan Caryll	1918	The Canary	
Throw Me a Rose	Emmerich Kálmán; Herbert Reynolds	1916	Miss Springtime	
Till The Clouds Roll By	Jerome Kern	1917 unknown 1986	Oh, Boy! Till the Clouds Roll by Jerome Kern Goes to Hollywood	
To Live a Simple Life	Herbert Haines	1907	My Darling	
True to Me	Ivan Caryll; Guy Bolton	1918	The Girl Behind the Gun	
Try Again	Louis Hirsch; Guy Bolton	1918	Oh, My Dear!	
Tulip Time in Sing Sing	Jerome Kern	1920; 1924	Sally; Sitting Pretty	
Twenties are here to Stay	George Gershwin; Guy Bolton	Unknown	--	
Two Little Ships	Armand Vecsey; Guy Bolton	1927	The Nightingale	
A Very Good Girl on Sunday	Jerome Kern; Herbert Reynolds	1916	Miss Springtime	
Victor Light Opera Selection	Jerome Kern; Guy Bolton	1917	Leave It to Jane	
Vive La France	Rudolph Friml; Clifford Grey	1928	The Three Musketeers	
Wait Till Tomorrow	Jerome Kern; Guy Bolton	1917	Leave It to Jane	
We're Crooks	Jerome Kern	1917	Miss 1917	
West Point song	Sigmund Romberg	1928	Rosalie	
What I'm Longing to Say	Jerome Kern	1917	Leave It to Jane	
What! What! What!	Armand Vecsey	1919	The Rose of China	
What's The Use?	Louis Hirsch; Guy Bolton	1918	Oh, My Dear!	
When the Ships Come Home	Jerome Kern	1920	That Little Thing	
When You Are in China	Armand Vecsey	1919	The Rose of China	
When You Take the Road With Me	Jerome Kern	1923	The Beauty Prize	
When You're Full of Talk	Jerome Kern; Herbert Reynolds	1916	Miss Springtime	
The Whippoorwill Waltz	Jerome Kern; Clifford Grey	1920	Sally	
Why Don't They Hand It to Me?	Emmerich Kálmán	1917	The Riviera Girl	
Why Must We always be Dreaming	Sigmund Romberg	1928	Rosalie	
Why?	Jerome Kern	1917	Leave It to Jane	
Wild Rose	Jerome Kern; Clifford Grey	1920	Sally	
Will You Forget?	Emmerich Kálmán	1917	The Riviera Girl	
Women Haven't Any Mercy on a Man	Ivan Caryll; Guy Bolton	1918	The Girl Behind the Gun	
Words Are Not Needed (Every Day)	Jerome Kern; Guy Bolton	1917	Oh, Boy!	
Worries	Jerome Kern	1924	Sitting Pretty	
Yale	Armand Vecsey	1919	The Rose of China	
A Year from Today	Jerome Kern; Guy Bolton	1924	Sitting Pretty	
Yesterday	Armand Vecsey	1919	The Rose of China	
You Can't Keep a Good Girl Down	Jerome Kern; Clifford Grey	1920	Sally	
You Can't Make Love by Wireless	Jerome Kern; George Grossmith, Jr.	1923	The Beauty Prize	
You Found Me and I Found You	Jerome Kern	1918	Oh, Lady! Lady!!	
You Never Knew About Me	Jerome Kern; Guy Bolton	1917	Oh, Boy!	
You Never Know	Louis Hirsch; Guy Bolton	1918	Oh, My Dear!	
You Said Something	Jerome Kern	1917	Have a Heart	
You, You, You	Guy Jones	1907	The Gay Gordons	
You'll Find Me Playing Mah-Jongg	Jerome Kern	1923	The Beauty Prize	
Your Eyes	Rudolf Friml	1928	The Three Musketeers	
You're the Top	Cole Porter	1934	Anything Goes	Lyrics re-written by Wodehouse for British version
