= The Cabaret Girl =

Musical comedy by Jerome Kern, George Grossmith, Jr. and P. G. Wodehouse

- Music: Jerome Kern
- Lyrics: George Grossmith and P. G. Wodehouse
- Book: George Grossmith and P. G. Wodehouse
- Productions: 1922, Winter Garden Theatre, Drury Lane, London; 2008, Ohio Light Opera, Wooster, OH

The Cabaret Girl is a musical comedy in three acts with music by Jerome Kern and book and lyrics by George Grossmith, Jr. and P. G. Wodehouse. It was produced by Grossmith and J. A. E. Malone at the Winter Garden Theatre in London's West End in September 1922 and featured Dorothy Dickson, Grossmith, Geoffrey Gwyther, and Norman Griffin (later replaced by Leslie Henson) in the leading roles.

The first performance was originally scheduled for Thursday, 14 September 1922, with Henson in a leading role, but he fell ill on the morning of the scheduled opening, which was delayed to allow Griffin to prepare for the part. The show finally opened the following Tuesday, 19 September. According to the reviewer in The Times, "Last night the piece received the warmest of receptions and thoroughly deserved it." The production ran for 361 performances, closing on 11 August 1923. Henson took over from Griffin on 22 January 1923. (Note: Griffin joined the show's national tour on the same day, at the Empire Theatre, Preston.)

The Cabaret Girl was first given an American production in 2004 when San Francisco's 42nd Street Moon company produced a staged concert of the show. Its first full American production was in 2008, when the Ohio Light Opera gave seven performances, between 26 June and 8 August, as part of their 30th Anniversary season. The same company released a commercial recording of the work in 2009 on Albany Records. The recording is the earliest work composed by Kern to be restored and recorded in its original form. The first New York City production was given in March 2009, in a concert staging by the semi-professional troupe Musicals Tonight!

== Background ==
Actor-manager George Grossmith, Jr. and his partner Edward Laurillard bought the New Middlesex Theatre in London's West End in 1919 and, after its refurbishment, re-opened it as the Winter Garden Theatre. The first production was Kissing Time, written by P. G. Wodehouse and Guy Bolton and starring Grossmith and Leslie Henson. After Grossmith's partnership with Laurillard broke up two years later, Grossmith retained control of the Winter Garden where, between 1921 and 1926, in partnership with Pat Malone, he produced a series of shows, many of which were adaptations of imported shows and featured Henson. The first production by the Grossmith-Malone partnership was Sally, with music by Jerome Kern, a book by Bolton and some of the lyrics by Wodehouse, which was the London transfer of a Broadway hit. The second, with an original book, was The Cabaret Girl.

Kern and Wodehouse had both worked with Grossmith early in their careers and had, together with Bolton, created an innovative series of musicals for the Princess Theatre on Broadway. In his 1933 autobiography, Grossmith described how he, Wodehouse and Kern managed their collaboration. While the two writers travelled to New York, drafting the lyrics of the ensemble numbers and finales on the boat, Kern was already at work at his home in Bronxville, New York, composing the melodies. When the trio gathered at Bronxville, Kern began setting the completed lyrics to music, while Grossmith and Wodehouse prepared "dummy" lyrics for Kern's melodies, the actual lyrics being completed on the return voyage. The trio worked from piano or "fiddle" copies of the music, leaving Kern to follow them to London with the completed orchestration a few weeks later.

== Synopsis ==
The hero, James ("Jim") Paradene is the nephew of the Marchioness of Harrogate. He has been left a small fortune by his father, on condition that he must marry a lady who meets with the approval of the Marchioness and her son, the Marquis of Harrogate. Unfortunately, Jim wishes to marry Marilynn Morgan, but his trustees disapprove of her because she is a chorus girl.

Act 1: The Showroom of Messrs Gripps & Gravvins, Music Publishers, Bond Street, London

Jim comes to the offices of Gripps and Gravins looking for a song to sing at his local village concert. When Marilynn also arrives, to audition for a cabaret that Gripps and Gravvins are producing, Jim tries to persuade her to give up her career and settle with him in the country, but she refuses and suggests that they should part. Jim, however, has an idea: if he and Marilynn pretend to be married, his trustees will no longer be able to withhold their approval. Gravvins has "a little place in the country", "The Pergola" at Woollam Chersey, Hertfordshire, and invites the young couple to visit it.

Act 2: "The Pergola", Woollam Chersey

Jim and Marilynn arrive at "The Pergola" in the guise of a honeymoon couple. The plan is that Gravvins will invite the local aristocracy to a garden party, to meet the honeymoon couple, with the intention that the Marchioness will be impressed with Marilynn's social standing. But all the notables of the district are away on holiday, so the members of the Gripps & Gravvins cabaret troupe are enlisted to impersonate them. Gravvins himself takes the part of the local vicar, but the plot is unmasked when the real vicar appears. Marilynn, thoroughly embarrassed, admits her part in the deception and announces that she will have nothing more to do with Mr James Parradine, before fleeing the scene.

Act 3: "All Night Follies" at The Cabaret

Marilynn is performing in the Gripps & Gravvins production, "All Night Follies", at The Cabaret, where Jim comes looking for her. He has realised that he cannot expect Marilynn to give up the bright city lights and is prepared to go along with her wishes if she will agree to marry him. The curtain falls before the Marchioness and her son have given their approval, but as she has expressed admiration for Marilynn and he has fallen for the charms of Lily de Jigger, another member of the cast, a happy ending seems probable.

== Cast ==
The original cast, in order of appearance, was:

Marchioness of Harrogate				Miss Fortescue
Marquis of Harrogate		Her son		Peter Haddon
Effie Dix				Vera Lennox
Miss Simmons	)		(	Dorothy Hurst
Miss Tompkins	)	Assistants at the firm of	(	Dorothy Field
Miss Witmore	)	Gripps & Gravvins	(	Cecile Maule-Cole
Miss Brownlow	)		(	Eileen Seymour
Commissionaire				Jack Glynn
A Customer				Dorothy Bentham
Mr Gripps	)	Partners in a firm of	(	George Grossmith
Mr Gravvins	)	music publishers	(	Norman Griffin
James Paradene				Geoffrey Gwyther
Harry Zona	)		(	Thomas Weguelin
March	)	Members of the	(	Seymour Beard
April	)	"All Night Follies"	(	Enid Taylor
Little Ada	)	cabaret troupe	(	Heather Thatcher
Lily de Jigger	)		(	Molly Ramsden
Marilynn Morgan ("Flick")				Dorothy Dickson
Feloosi (an agent)				Joseph Spree
Quibb (a piano tuner)				Leigh Ellis
Mrs Drawbridge		Housekeeper at "The Pergola"		Muriel Barnby
The Mayor of Woollam Chersey				Claude Horton
Laburnum Brown				Molly Vere
Lilac Smith				Vera Kirkwood
Poppy Robinson				Dorothy Deane
Hyacinth Green				Monica Noyes
Tulip Williams				Betsy Shields
The Vicar of Woollam Chersey				Ernest Graham
Box Office Keeper				Fred Whitlock
Cabaret Dancer				Mr Jinos

- Wodehouse reused some of the names from The Cabaret Girl in his later works: "Flick" and Mr Paradene are characters in Bill the Conqueror (1924); in "Jeeves and the Impending Doom" (1926), Bertie Wooster's Aunt Agatha has a country estate at Woollam Chersey; so, too, does the hero of his play Good Morning, Bill (1928), Bill Paradene.

== Musical numbers ==
Act 1

- Overture
- Opening chorus—Chopin ad lib - chorus and girls
- You want the best seats, we have 'em - Effie and girls
- Mr Gravvins—Mr Gripps - Gravvins and Gripps
- First rose of summer - Girls, Gripps and Jim
- Journey's end - Jim and Marilynn
- Whoop-de-oodle-do! - Gravvins and cabaret troupe
- Dancing time - Quibb, Miss Simmons, Gravvins and Marilynn
- My little place in the country - Gravvins and Gripps

Act 2

- The Pergola patrol - company
- Praise for our zeal - porters, Marilynn and Jim
- Shimmy with me - Marilynn
- Those days are gone forever - Gravvins
- Looking all over for you - Jim and Marilynn
- Nerves - Gravvins, Gripps and Ada
- Finale—Act 2 - Gravvins, Gripps, Jim, Marilynn, Vicar, chorus

Act 3

- Opening: Good evening - Jim and Ada
- London, dear old London - Jim and Burthen (George Grossmith)
- Kahlua - Marilynn
- Finale—Act 3: Oriental dreams - ensemble
- Dancing time - Marilynn, Jim and chorus (an alternative has this sung in Act 1, by Marilynn and Gravvins)

Many of the numbers in The Cabaret Girl derived from, or were later modified for, other works:

- "Chopin ad lib" and "First rose of summer" were adapted from Kern's 1919 Broadway show She's a Good Fellow, the book and lyrics of which were written by Anne Caldwell.
- The duet "Mr Gravvins – Mr Gripps" was a pastiche of a hit song, "Mister Gallagher and Mister Shean", from the 1922 Ziegfeld Follies.
- Kern revised the music of "Journey's end" when he included it in his 1925 Broadway show, The City Chap.
- "The Pergola patrol" reappeared, shortened and with some lyrics changed, as "Is this not a lovely spot?" in Sitting Pretty.
- "Shimmy with Me" introduced London's theatregoers to a new American dance craze, the "Shimmy". It, too, was reused in The City Chap, as "He Is the Type".
- Wodehouse had used a very similar version of "Nerves" in See You Later (1918).
- Kern borrowed "Oriental dreams" for Sweet Adeline.
