= Colin O'More =

Music educator and singer

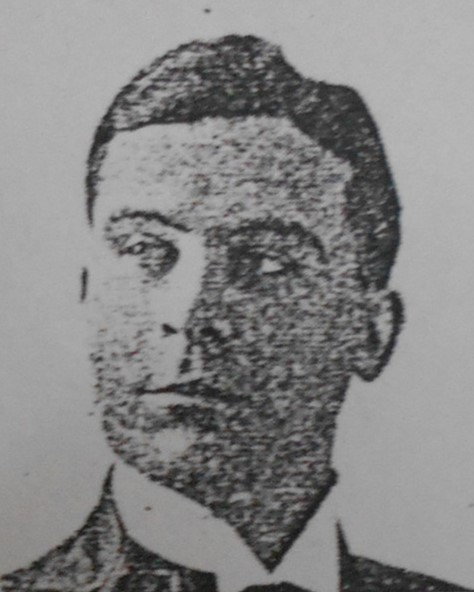
- James Harrod in the mid-1910s
- Born: James Harrod Hornberger; January 20, 1890; Heber Springs, Arkansas, US
- Died: September 21, 1956 (aged 66); Lakeland, Florida, US
- Education: College of Music of Cincinnati
- Occupations: singer, music educator, and broadcasting executive
- Years active: 1900s–1950s

Colin O'More (January 20, 1890 – September 21, 1956) was a popular concert singer, music educator, and pioneer executive in broadcasting. "Till the Clouds Roll By," a duet with Anna Wheaton, was one of the first singles to hit #1 on the American music charts.

== Early life ==
O'More was born James Harrod Hornberger on January 20, 1890, in Heber Springs, Arkansas. He was the second of five children who survived infancy of William Jefferson (1860–1926) and Elva (Spinks) Hornberger (1871–1910). He began his musical career while a student at the College of Music of Cincinnati. He also studied abroad with Jean de Reszke, Edmond Clément, Lucien Fugère, Sir Henry Wood, and others.

== Career ==
By 1910, he was known by just his given birthname. As James Harrod he made several recordings on the Columbia label including "Till the Clouds Roll By", a duet with Anna Wheaton from the musical Oh, Boy!. The song spent six weeks at #1 on the American music charts in 1917.

Beginning in 1918, he started recording under the name Colin O'More on the Vocalion label.

He also worked as a vocal coach for many years in New York City. O'More served in various executive capacities at CBS Radio Network and was a pioneering executive in television at NBC.

Starting around 1943, he became a professor of music at Florida Southern College, where he taught for the remainder of his life.

== Personal ==
O'More married Madeleine E. Mitten in New Jersey in 1916. After that marriage ended he married Catherine Louise Steinbock, to whom he was married until his death. There was no issue of either marriage.

== Death ==
O'More died on September 21, 1956, in Lakeland, Florida.
