= The Beauty Prize =

1923 musical comedy

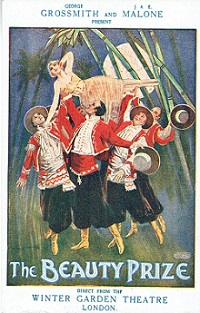
- Postcard from the Winter Garden Theatre production
- Music: Jerome Kern
- Lyrics: George Grossmith and P. G. Wodehouse
- Book: George Grossmith and P. G. Wodehouse
- Productions: 1923, Winter Garden Theatre, Drury Lane, London; 2005, 45th Street Theatre, New York

The Beauty Prize is a musical comedy in three acts, with music by Jerome Kern, book and lyrics by George Grossmith and P. G. Wodehouse. It was first produced by Grossmith and J A E Malone on 5 September 1923 at the Winter Garden Theatre, Drury Lane, London. It was designed to replace The Cabaret Girl, which the same team had produced with great success the previous year, at the same theatre and with predominantly the same cast, but failed to achieve the same success. The review of the first night performance in The Times described it as:

not ... equal to its select band of predecessors... It has quite an involved plot, which is never very interesting: a vast number of characters, most of whom are never very convincing ... The 'book', by Mr George Grossmith and Mr P G Wodehouse, has many flashes of wit but, on the whole, the narrative is an arid desert in which the music of Mr Jerome Kern makes only an occasional oasis... At the end the piece obtained rather a mixed reception.

The show ran for a total of 214 performances, closing on 8 March 1924.

The Beauty Prize received its first American production when it was presented in a concert-style staging by Musicals Tonight! at the 45th Street Theatre, New York, from 26 April to 8 May 2005.

== Synopsis ==
The plot of The Beauty Prize involves two pairs of lovers who are kept apart by a succession of complications, before everything is satisfactorily resolved in the final act.

John Brooke is a wealthy young Englishman. Carol Stuart is the daughter of James K Stuart, a rich American. Meeting at a charity ball, each is attracted to the other, but pretends to be poor, a deception that continues even after they have become engaged.

Act 1

Scene 1: The Supper Room at Carl's Private Club

The girls discuss a newspaper beauty competition in which the winner will receive a substantial cash prize, plus a husband. John arrives and tells his secretary, Flutey, that he and Carol have set a date for their wedding, but is startled to see Carol's photograph in the newspaper as an entrant in the beauty competition. He does not know that Carol's portrait has been entered, without her knowledge, by Lovey Toots, a milliner's assistant who is an admirer of Carol's.

Scene 2: Carol Stuart's Home, Kensington – A few days later

Carol's servants and friends are preparing for her wedding when Odo Philpotts arrives at her Kensington apartment. she has won the newspaper competition and he is the prize. Meanwhile, Mrs Hexal, Carol's chaperone—who had hoped to win John for herself and who sees it as her duty to separate Carol from her seemingly impecunious fiancé—has learnt from the morning newspaper that Carol has won the beauty competition; she reveals to John that Carol is a wealthy heiress and manages to insinuate that it was Carol herself who entered the competition, seeking a husband. John is incensed and, believing that Carol has tricked him and that he was nothing more than her latest "purchase", he upbraids her. She, in turn, is angered by his attitude and, in a fit of pique, announces that she will marry Odo. John retaliates by threatening to marry Lovey, unaware that she and Odo are mutually attracted to each other.

Act 2

On board the SS Majestania – A few days later

All the principal characters are on board the Majestania, apparently bound for Carol's home in Florida. Odo has established himself as the life and soul of the party, organising events, winning all the sports contests, and finding ample time to pursue his interest in Lovey. Carol cannot abide him, and John feels the same about Lovey; they argue whenever they meet, but are clearly still in love and regretting their hasty action on the morning of their intended wedding. Flutey sees a way of resolving the situation: he suggests that each, without telling the other, should bribe the wireless operator to deliver to them a phony telegram announcing that their fortune has been lost in a financial crisis; this will restore the situation to what they understood it to be when they first met, thus removing the obstacle to their reconciliation. But Flutey has reckoned without Odo, who nobly announces that he and Lovey are engaged to Carol and John respectively and will not abandon them just because they are now impoverished.

Act 3

Gardens of James Stuart's Home, Long Island – A few days later

In a brisk denouement, Carol and John confess that they are not really ruined, and are reconciled; Odo and Lovey, released from their engagements, can look forward to life together in a little cottage in Kent; and Flutey finds a new position as personal secretary to Carol's father.

== Roles and original cast ==
The original principal cast, in order of appearance, was:

- Hon. Dud Wellington – Peter Haddon
- Meadow Grahame – Dorothy Field
- Mrs Hexal – Sheila Courtnay
- Shinny Fane – Marjorie Spiers
- Gypsy Lorrimole – Dorothy Hurst
- Flutey Warboy, Private secretary to John Brooke – George Grossmith Jr.
- John Brooke – Jack Hobbs
- Doreen – Eileen Seymour
- Hector, Butler – Ernest Graham
- Kitty Wren – Vera Lennox
- Carol Stuart – Dorothy Dickson
- Lovey Toots, of the Maison Loie – Heather Thatcher
- Jones, a foundling – Claude Horton
- Mr Odo Philpotts – Leslie Henson
- Quartermaster – Leigh Ellis
- James K Stuart, Carol's father – Arthur Finn
- Pedro – William Parnis
- Marconi Boy – Winifred Shotter

== Musical numbers ==
Act 1

- When you take the road with me – Gypsy and Ensemble
- Now that we are nearly through – Kitty, Hector and Ensemble
- What lovelier things a bride could adorn – Kitty and Girls
- Honeymoon Isle – Carol and Kitty
- I'm a prize – Odo and Carol
- It's a long, long day – Flutey
- Joy bells – Dud, Kitty, Men and girls
- Finale, Act I – Odo and Ensemble

Act 2

- You'll find me playing mah-jong – Ensemble
- You can't make love by wireless – Flutey and Carol
- Non-stop dancing – Odo
- That's what I'd do for the girl/man I love – John and Carol
- A cottage in Kent – Lovey and Odo
- Finale, Act 2 – Carol, John, Flutey, Boys and Girls

Act 3

- Opening chorus – Ensemble
- Meet me down on Main Street – Odo and Flutey
- Moon love – Carol and Men
- Finale – Company

The lyrics of The Beauty Prize included a number of allusions to popular fads of the day: beauty competitions, mah-jong, and endurance dancing; while "Meet me down on Main Street", with its refrain "Oh, won't you meet me down on Main Street / Where the George F Babbits grow", explicitly referenced Sinclair Lewis's 1922 novel, Babbitt.

"Non-stop dancing", with its references to "Grandma" dancing, also echoes an earlier Wodehouse work:

"Why, that trickly thing—you know, in the second act—is the darlingest thing I ever heard. I'm mad about it."

"Do you mean the one that goes lumty-lumty-tum, tumty-tumty-tum?"

"No, the one that goes ta-rumty-tum-tum, ta-rumty-tum. You know! The one about Granny dancing the shimmy."

"I'm not responsible for the words, you know", urged George hastily. "Those are wished on me by the lyrist."

— Wodehouse, A Damsel in Distress ch 23 (1919)

'George' in this exchange is the novel's composer hero, George Bevan, who is thought to have been modelled on Jerome Kern. As with the previous year's The Cabaret Girl, some of the songs from The Beauty Prize reappeared in later Kern works: "Moon love" became one version of "Sunshine" in Sunny (1925) and "You can't make love by wireless" was rewritten as "Bow belles" for Blue Eyes (1929), while "You'll find me playing mah-jong" was reworked as "De land o' good times" in Kern's unpublished (and, hence, little-known) work Gentlemen Unafraid (1938).
