= Geoffrey Gwyther =

English singer, actor and composer (1892–1944)

Gwyther with Dorothy Dickson in The Cabaret Girl (1922)

Geoffrey Matheson Gwyther (8 October 1892 – 27 July 1944) was an English singer, actor, songwriter, and composer.

Gwyther was educated at Gresham's School, Holt, where he was taught by Geoffrey Shaw and took delight in the music of Henry Purcell. From there, in 1910 he went on to New College, Oxford. In 1913, as a prelude to the musical Cupid in Clapham, there was a performance in the West End of his setting of William Blake's Songs of Innocence. This was later performed at Gwyther's old school, under the direction of Shaw, and was well received.

On 3 October 1914, soon after the beginning of the First World War, Gwyther was commissioned into the Suffolk Regiment as a second lieutenant, on probation, the army relying on his years as a cadet in an Officers Training Corps at Gresham's. In March 1915, he was confirmed in that rank. By 1916, he had been promoted to lieutenant, and from April to June of that year had a temporary appointment as an instructor. In 1917, he was still serving with his regiment in France, now with the rank of Captain, but on 9 May 1917 was transferred to the retired list, due to ill health.

On returning to civilian life, and in the years after the war, Gwyther became a successful singer and songwriter, singing in musical theatre and also making appearances as an actor. In 1929, he played Kenneth McKay in the silent film Red Aces, directed by Edgar Wallace.

Gwyther died on 27 June 1944 at the Bryn Mawr Hospital in Bryn Mawr, Pennsylvania, following a heart attack. His obituary in The New York Times noted that he had been wounded in the First World War.
