= Red Aces =

1930 film

- Directed by: Edgar Wallace
- Written by: Edgar Wallace
- Based on: Red Aces (novel) by Edgar Wallace
- Produced by: S. W. Smith
- Starring: Janice Adair; Muriel Angelus; Nigel Bruce
- Production company: British Lion Films
- Distributed by: British Lion Films
- Release date: 3 November 1930
- Country: United Kingdom
- Languages: Silent; English intertitles

Red Aces is a British silent crime film of 1929 directed by Edgar Wallace and starring Janice Adair, Muriel Angelus and Nigel Bruce. It was adapted by Wallace from one of his own novels, Red Aces (1929), featuring the character of J.G. Reeder. It was shot at Beaconsfield Studios where Wallace had established a company British Lion Films to film versions of his works.

== Cast ==
- Janice Adair as Margot Lynn
- Muriel Angelus as Ena Burslem
- Geoffrey Gwyther as Kenneth McKay
- James Raglan as Rufus Machfield
- Nigel Bruce as Kinsfeather, T.B.
- George Bellamy as Reeder - J.G.
- W. Cronin Wilson as Walter Wentworth
- Douglas Payne as Insp. Gaylor
- Carol Reed as Minor role

== Bibliography ==
- Mayer, Geoff. Historical Dictionary of Crime Films. Scarecrow Press, 2012.
- Ken Wlaschin, Silent Mystery and Detective Movies: A Comprehensive Filmography (2009), p. 189
