= Louise Groody =

American actress

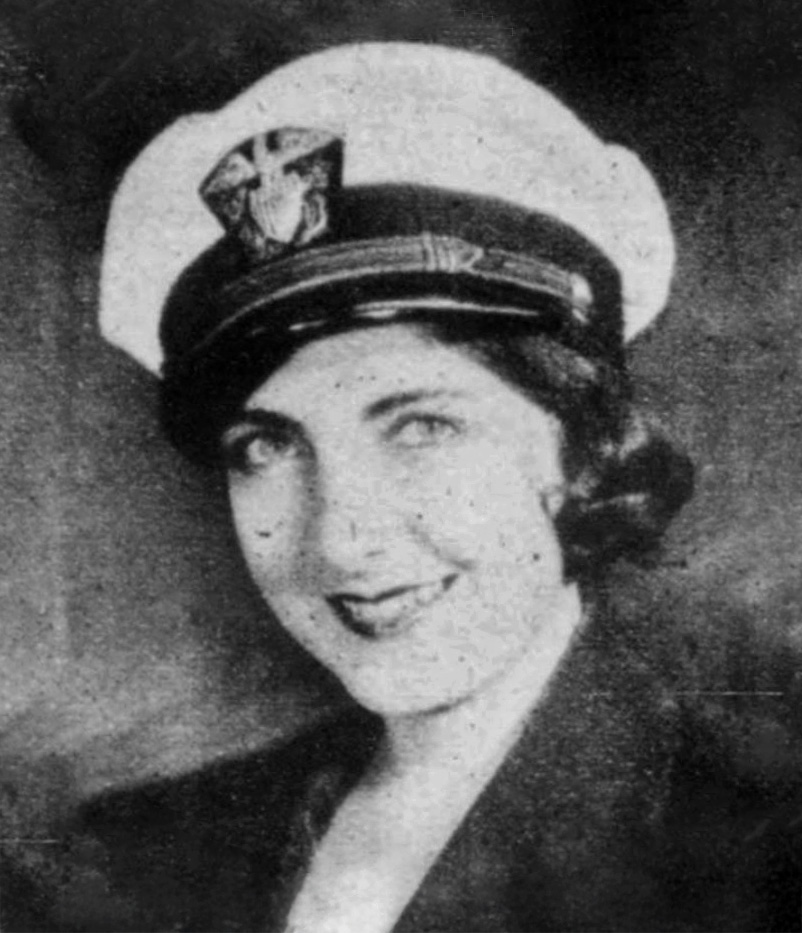
- Groody during a production of Hit the Deck in 1928
- Born: March 27, 1897; Waco, Texas, US
- Died: September 16, 1961 (aged 64); Canadensis, Pennsylvania, US
- Occupations: Actress, singer, dancer
- Spouse(s): William Harrigan; William F. McGee; John G. Loofburrow

Louise Groody (March 27, 1897 – September 16, 1961) was an American Broadway musical comedy star of the 1920s who introduced to New York audiences the song "Tea for Two" in the musical No, No, Nanette.

== Early life ==
Louise Groody was born on March 27, 1897, in Waco, Texas, the first of three girls and a boy raised by Thomas and Irene Groody. Her father, a native of Pennsylvania, supported his family as a drug store manager and pharmacist. Irene Groody was from Louisiana and had married Thomas in 1893. During the early years of her childhood Louise Groody's family would live in Houston and later Atlantic City, New Jersey.

== Career ==
Groody began her career while still a teenager in 1915 as cabaret dancer in New York, and that same year began her career on Broadway working as a chorus girl. She drew the attention of Broadway producer Charles Dillingham who cast her in the supporting role of Gladiola in the 1915 C. M. S. McLellan musical revue Around the Map. In this show she sang Louis Hirsch's coon song "There's One Thing That a Coon Can Do".

Groody would go on to appear in nine more Broadway productions, mostly musical comedies, of which four would prove to be major hits with runs of well over 300 performances. In 1920 the diminutive five-foot brunette played Barbara, a principal role in The Night Boat, at the Liberty Theatre, and the following year she played Rose-Marie in Good Morning Dearie at the Globe Theatre. She played the title role Nanette in the 1925 hit No, No, Nanette, also staged at the Globe and in 1927, her favorite role, Loulou in Hit the Deck, at the Belasco Theatre. Audiences of the day most likely best remembered Louise Groody for the popular song "Tea for Two", from No, No, Nanette.

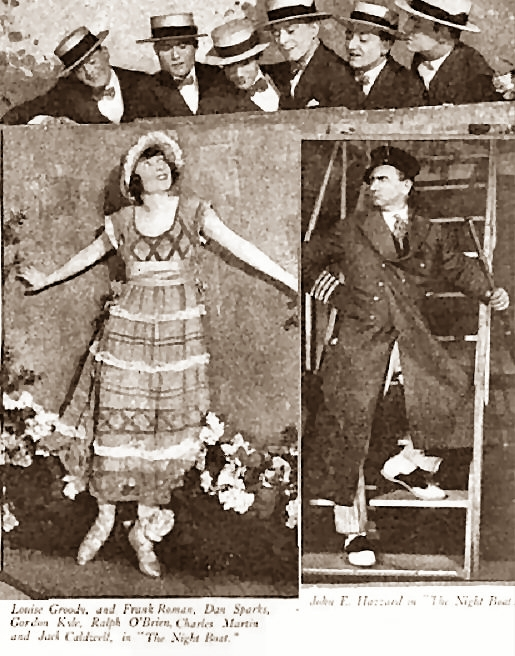
The Night Boat: Louise Groody with ensemble players; (insert) John F. Hazzard The Green Book Magazine, January 1920

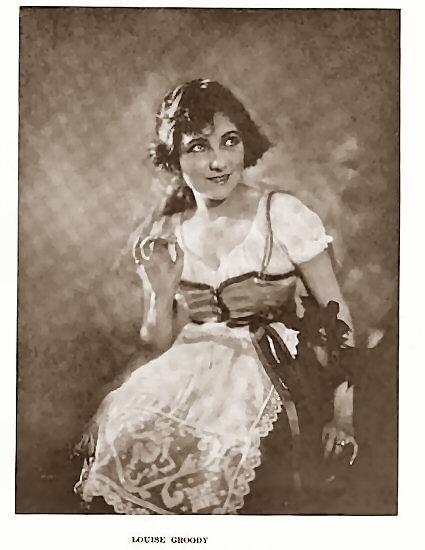
Photo-Era Magazine, 1919

== Marriages ==
Groody married on April 8, 1920, actor William Harrigan, the son of a prominent lawyer. The couple had hoped the ceremony would be conducted by Newark, N.J. Mayor, Charles P. Gillen, but as he became unavailable, settled upon Police Judge Michael J. Quigley instead.

She married stock broker William F. McGee a year or two later and soon became embroiled in a bucket shop scandal in which her husband's firm was accused of bilking some four thousand investors out of millions of dollars. Groody later cooperated with investigators and was able to prove she had also lost money in the scheme. She divorced McGee in 1923 shortly before he entered Sing Sing Prison to serve out his one-year sentence.

On January 8, 1949, she wed John G. Loofburrow (1902–1964), a one-time actor from Ohio who went on to serve for many years as New York night editor for the Associated Press. The couple remained together until her death in 1961.

== Later life ==
Groody's great success in the 1920s was tempered by the financial losses she suffered in the Wall Street crash of 1929. In the early 1930s she branched out to perform in vaudeville acts and on radio. By 1941 Groody's affluence was such she was able to lease a fashionable apartment on Manhattan's Park Avenue. During World War II she joined the American Red Cross and served for some time in the Allied Mediterranean Theatre of Operations. After the war she went on to appear in several 1950s television drama and celebrity panel shows. Groody died from cancer on September 16, 1961, at her summer home in Canadensis, Pennsylvania.
