= The Night Boat =

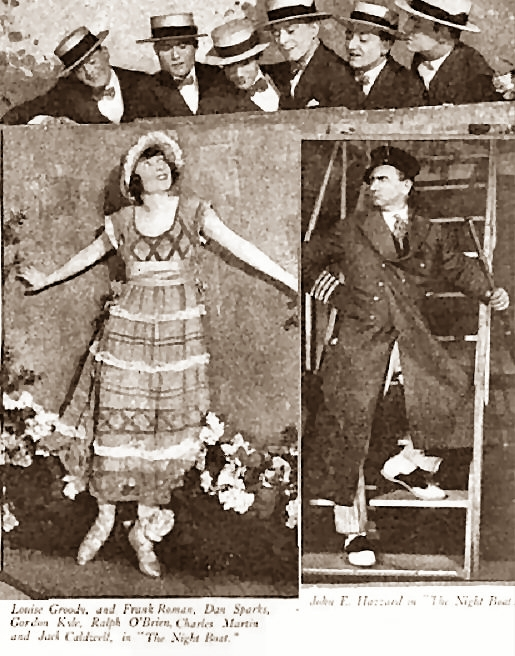
- (L) Louise Groody with ensemble players; (R) John E. Hazzard
- Music: Jerome Kern
- Lyrics: Anne Caldwell
- Book: Anne Caldwell
- Basis: farce by Alexandre Bisson
- Productions: 1920 Broadway

The Night Boat (1920) is a musical in three acts, based on a farce by Alexandre Bisson, with a book and lyrics by Anne Caldwell and music by Jerome Kern. The story lampoons the notorious New York City-to-Albany night boat, on which clandestine romances were common.

After out-of-town tryouts, the musical was produced on Broadway by Charles Dillingham, where it opened on February 2, 1920, at the Liberty Theatre under the direction of Fred G. Latham and Ned Wayburn, with music direction by Victor Baravalle. The Night Boat had a successful initial run of 313 performances, closing on October 30, 1920 and opening for a new run in Boston soon afterwards, followed by successful tours.

== Background ==
The team that created the famous Princess Theatre musicals broke apart acrimoniously in 1918, and Kern was eager to work with the affable Caldwell. The Night Boat was an immediate hit in New York, and her role in the musical made Louise Groody a Broadway star, going on to play, among others, the title role in No, No, Nanette in 1925. Kern and Caldwell collaborated a few more times in the 1920s before each turned to other collaborators. Since the original run and tours, the show has never been revived in a full production. The New Amsterdam Theatre Company revived the show in concert in 1983 in New York, as did 42nd Street Moon in 1996 in San Francisco.

== Synopsis ==
- Act I. At the White's.
- Act II. The Night Boat.
- Act III. At the De Costa's.

In order to enjoy romantic evenings or weekends away from home, Bob White has convinced his wife, Hazel, and his mother-in-law that he is the captain of an Albany night boat. Becoming suspicious, the mother-in-law directs an investigation which brings Bob's relatives down upon him during one of his trips. Bob borrows the real captain's uniform, but he must soon explain away two love triangles.

== Musical numbers ==
Act 1

- Some Fine Day – Barbara and Ensemble
- Whose Baby Are You? – Barbara and Freddie
- Left All Alone Again Blues – Hazel and Ensemble
- Good Night Boat (lyrics by Anne Caldwell and Frank Craven) – Bob, Hazel, Barbara, Freddie, Mrs. Maxim and Ensemble
- I'd Like a Lighthouse – Barbara and Freddie

Act 2

- Catskills, Hello – Ensemble
- Don't You Want to Take Me? – Barbara and Freddie
- I Love the Lassies (I Love Them All) – Captain White and Ensemble
- The Quadalquiver – Dance
  - (By the) Saskatchewan (from The Pink Lady; music by Ivan Caryll; lyrics by C. M. S. McLellan)
  - On the Banks of the Wabash, Far Away (music and lyric by Paul Dresser)
  - Congo Love Song (from Nancy Brown; music by J. Rosamond Johnson; lyrics by Bob Cole)
  - Row, Row, Row (from Ziegfeld Follies of 1912; music by James V. Monaco; lyrics by William Jerome)
  - Down by the Erie (from Hello, Broadway; music and lyrics by George M. Cohan)
  - M-i-s-s-i-s-s-i-p-p-i (from Ziegfeld's Midnight Revue 1916; music by Harry Tierney; lyrics by Bert Hanlon and Benny Ryan)
- Good Night Boat (reprise) – Company

Act 3

- A Heart for Sale – Barbara and Boys
- Girls Are Like a Rainbow – Freddie Ides, Betty, Susan, Molly, Jane and Chorus

== Roles and original principal cast ==
- Bob White: John E. ("Jack") Hazzard
- Mrs. Hazel White: Stella Hoban
- Barbara Maxim (Hazel's sister): Louise Groody
- Mrs. Maxim (Hazel's mother): Ada Lewis
- Freddie Ides (Barbara's beau): Hal Skelly
- Captain Robert White: Ernest Torrence
- The Steward: Hansford Wilson
- Dora de Costa: Lillian Kemble Cooper
- Minnie: Marie Reagen
- Inspector Dempsey: John Scannell
- Florence de Costa: Betty Hale
- Mrs. de Costa: Mrs. John Findlay
- A Workman: Irving Carpenter
- Little Miss Jazz: Isabel Falconer

== Critical reaction ==
The Forum, January, 1920, wrote:

Charles Dillingham piloted The Night Boat past the shoals of failure that lie in wait for every theatrical production, and anchored it firmly in the pleasing waters of the harbor of success. As his aides he summoned Anne Caldwell, author of a score of successful librettos, and Jerome Kern, who cannot write music that is not catchy. Of course, there is not much to the story, and the fact that the plot is of exceeding age matters but little. Who cares for a story when there is a good laugh, a swinging tune, and a pretty girl? Of the pretty girls, first honors go to Louise Groody, who danced all over the boat, and a young lady named Stella Hogan. John E. Hazzard and Ernest Torrance were the fun makers, ably assisted by Ada Lewis, who is, as always, amusing. The Night Boat is sure of a long trip.

The New York Times noted the audience's enthusiasm for the new piece and praised Dillingham's showmanship, predicting that several of the songs would become popular.
