= Anna Wheaton =

Musical theatre actress and singer (1894–1961)

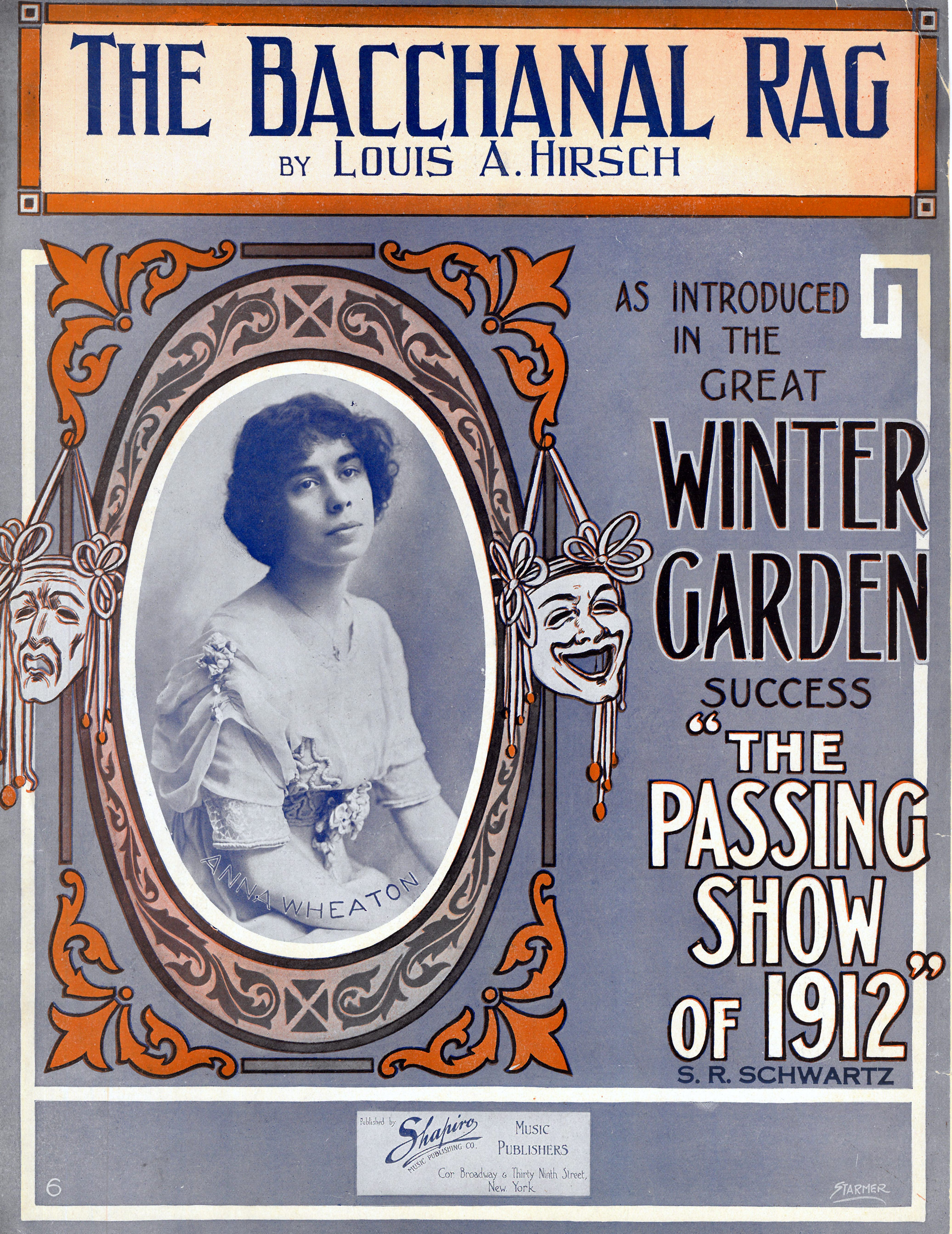
- Cover of published sheet music to "The Bacchanal Rag" by Louis A. Hirsch, 1912
- Born: Anna Meeker Wheaton; November 26, 1894; Savannah, Georgia, United States
- Died: December 25, 1961 (aged 67); Pasadena, California, United States
- Occupation: actor
- Years active: 1900s–1920s

Anna Meeker Wheaton (November 26, 1894 – December 25, 1961) was an American musical theatre actress and singer of the early 20th century.

== Biography ==
Wheaton was born on November 26, 1894 (some sources indicate 1893 or 1896), in Savannah, Georgia. As a young child, the family moved to Washington, D.C. While still a youngster, she made her Broadway debut in the American premiere of Peter Pan starring Maude Adams in 1905.

She is perhaps best known for her role as Jackie Simpson in the original production of Oh, Boy! in 1917. The hit musical featured the music of Jerome Kern with lyrics by Guy Bolton and P.G. Wodehouse. In the show, she performed "Till the Clouds Roll By" with Tom Powers. She subsequently recorded the song on Columbia Records with James Harrod, where it climbed to the top of the American music charts for six weeks.

Earlier that year, she had a solo hit with "M-I-S-S-I-S-S-I-P-P-I" from the revue, Hitchy-Koo. The song reached number two on the popular music charts.

== Personal ==
Wheaton married Walter Thomas Collins in New York City on June 18, 1919. The couple had one child, Walter Kendall Collins (1921–1996).

== Death ==
She died from a cerebral hemorrhage on December 25, 1961, in a Pasadena, California hospital.

== Theatre credits ==
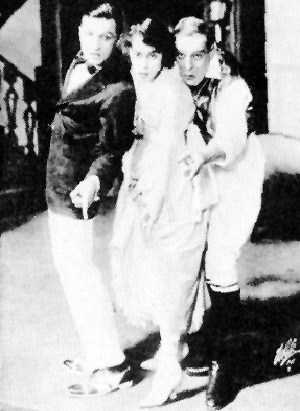
Tom Powers, Anna Wheaton and Hal Forde in Oh, Boy!

Year	Production	Theatre(s)	Role
1921	Ziegfeld 9 O'Clock Frolic	Danse de Follies	
1920	Three Showers	Harris Theatre / Plymouth Theatre	Roberta Lee "Bob" White
1917	Oh, Boy!	Princess Theatre / Casino Theatre	Jackie Simpson
1914	Miss Daisy	Shubert Theatre / Lyric Theatre	Elsie Swigget
1913	When Dreams Come True	Lyric Theatre / 44th Street Theatre	Margaret Smith
1913	Iolanthe	Casino Theatre	Celia
1913	The Mikado	Casino Theatre	Pitti-Sing
1913	The Beggar Student	Casino Theatre	Bronislava
1912	The Passing Show of 1912	Winter Garden Theatre	The Quaker Girl
1910	Madame Troubadour	Lyric Theatre / Nazimova's 39th Street Theatre	Georgette
1910	Up and Down Broadway	Casino Theatre	Miss Frite
1909	The Rose of Algeria	Herald Square Theatre / West End Theatre	Mrs. Billings F. Cooings
1906	Cape Cod Folks	Academy of Music	Sophronia
1905	Peter Pan	Empire Theatre	Liza

== Selected discography ==
Year	Single	Label and number	US Chart
1917	"M-I-S-S-I-S-S-I-P-P-I"	Columbia 2224	2
1917	"Till the Clouds Roll By" (w/ James Harrod) / "Drip, Drip, Drip, Went the Waterfall"	Columbia 2261	1
1917	"Help, Help, I'm Sinking"	Columbia 2295	-
1917	"There's a Million Reasons Why I Shouldn't Kiss You" (w/ Sam Ash)	Columbia 2303	-
1917	"How Can Any Girlie Be a Good Little Girl (When She Loves a Naughty Little Boy?)	Columbia 2334	-
1917	"I Don't Want to be Loved a Little by a Lot of Little Boys (But by One Little Boy a Lot)" (from the musical, His Little Widows)/"I'd Love to be a Monkey in the Zoo"	Columbia 2384	-
