= A Night Out (musical) =

- Marcelle, Matthieu's "ghostly" daughters, Matthieu and Pinglet
- Music: Willie Redstone; Cole Porter
- Lyrics: Clifford Grey
- Book: George Grossmith, Jr. Arthur Miller
- Basis: L'Hôtel du libre échange by Georges Feydeau and Maurice Desvallières
- Productions: 1920 West End

A Night Out is a musical comedy with a book by George Grossmith, Jr. and Arthur Miller, music by Willie Redstone and Cole Porter and lyrics by Clifford Grey. The story is adapted from the 1894 French comedy L'Hôtel du libre échange by Georges Feydeau and Maurice Desvallières. The sculptor Pinglet gets an evening away from his domineering wife and dines with the attractive Marcelle Delavaux. After a series of coincidences and mix-ups, he manages the deception without suffering any adverse consequences.

The musical was presented with success at the Winter Garden Theatre, London, from 1920 to 1921 and then toured in Britain.

== History ==
In 1896, "A Night Out", a non-musical adaptation of L'Hôtel du libre échange, opened in London and ran for 500 nights; George Grossmith Jr played Maxime. A quarter of a century later, the musical adaptation, produced by Grossmith and Edward Laurillard followed the story of the earlier adaptation (and the French original) closely. The score was by the resident conductor of the Winter Garden Theatre, Willie Redstone, with music for additional numbers provided by the young Cole Porter as some of his earliest professional work.

The musical was first presented at the Winter Garden Theatre, London, on 18 September 1920 and ran for 309 performances, closing on 18 June 1921. A touring company presented the piece in the British provinces in 1921, with Norman Griffin in the lead as Pinglet. In 1925, the musical was produced in the US, and in Australia, in the 1920s, it was an enormously successful vehicle for Cecil Kellaway.

== Roles and original cast ==
Stanley Holloway as René (centre)

- Joseph Pinglet – Leslie Henson
- Mme. Pinglet – Stella St. Audrie
- Marcelle Delavaux – Lily St. John (later, Margaret Bannerman)
- Maurice Paillard – Fred Leslie
- Matthieu – Davy Burnaby
- Victorine – Phyllis Monkman
- René – Stanley Holloway
- Kiki – Elsa Macfarlane
- Maxime – Austin Melford
- Bastien – Lucien Mussiere
- Boulot – Ralph Roberts
- Chief of Police – E. Graham

== Synopsis ==
Marcelle, Mme. Pinglet, Paillard and Pinglet

Act I

The sculptor Joseph Pinglet is henpecked by his domineering wife, and is ready to rebel by a little unauthorised outing. He intends to dine with the attractive Marcelle Delavaux, the neglected fiancée of Maurice Paillard, in a private room at the Hotel Pimlico. Madame Pinglet has been summoned to visit her sick sister, but she locks Pinglet in his studio before she leaves. Pinglet uses the bell-pull as a rope and escapes by the balcony.

Act II

Pinglet and Marcelle have arrived at the hotel. Unknown to them, their fellow guests include Monsieur Matthieu and his four young daughters, who are given a room that is reputed to be haunted. By an oversight, the same room has also been allotted to Maurice Paillard, who is intent on an intimate evening with Victorine, the Pinglets' maid. Pinglet and Marcelle are disturbed by frantic banging on their door and the voice of Paillard, who has been terrified at finding in his room four figures in white – Matthieu's daughters – who he assumes are ghosts. The confusion is compounded by a police raid. The police take the names of all present. Victorine gives her name as Madame Pinglet.

Back at his studio, Pinglet climbs in just before his wife returns. She is very dishevelled from a traffic accident. The summonses arrive from the police. Pinglet sees Mme. Pinglet's name on one of them and turns on his bewildered wife and upbraids her for her licentious behaviour. The police arrive with the others who have been at the hotel. In the ensuing row over Victorine's imposture, Pinglet's and Marcelle's part in the evening's events are overlooked and they escape any adverse consequences of their night out.

== Musical numbers ==
Paillard (r) disturbs Marcelle and Pinglet

- You've got to learn to love, some day – Victorine and Maxime
- The Hotel Pimlico – Maurice Paillard
- Bolshevik Love – Pinglet, Mme. Pinglet, Marcelle and Paillard
- It's a terrible world – Marcelle and Pinglet
- There's One Little Girlie For Me –
- Ragpicker's Dance
- Look around – Marcelle (music by Porter, lyrics by Grey)
- Why didn't we meet before? – Marcelle and Pinglet (music by Porter, lyrics by Grey)
- Our hotel – (music by Porter, lyrics by Grey)
- It'll be all the same – Pinglet (music by Melville Gideon, lyrics by Arthur Anderson)
- Finale (It's a sad day at this hotel) – Company (music by Porter, lyrics by Grey)

== Critical reception ==
The Times wrote, "With Mr. Henson A Night Out is one of the brightest things of its kind which we have had for a very long time, and even without him it would still be a first-class entertainment." In The Observer, St. John Ervine was lukewarm, commenting that, "those who like this kind of stuff ... can be certain that the wit will not make any demand on the intelligence, and provided they have eaten and drunk lavishly they will probably enjoy it. The Illustrated London News thought the success of the piece principally due to Henson's performance, calling him "a little genius".

In The Manchester Guardian, during the musical's provincial tour, Samuel Langford wrote that the plot was "a comparative masterpiece" by the usual standard of musical comedy, and the music "quite witty and graceful by the same comparisons".
