= George Grossmith Jr. =

English actor and theatre manager (1874–1935)

- Grossmith in 1912
- Born: 11 May 1874; Chalk Farm, London, England
- Died: 6 June 1935 (aged 61); Marylebone, London
- Occupations: Actor, theatrical producer, playwright and songwriter
- Spouse: Adelaide Astor
- Parent(s): George Grossmith and Emmeline Rosa Noyce

George Grossmith (11 May 1874 – 6 June 1935), known until 1912 as George Grossmith Jr., (Note: There were three generations of George Grossmiths who performed on stage: the second, the Gilbert and Sullivan star, appeared as "George Grossmith Jnr" until the death of his father in 1880, and the third followed suit as "George Grossmith Jun", "Jnr", or Jr." between his début in 1892 and the death of the second in 1912.) was an English actor, theatre producer and manager, director, playwright and songwriter, remembered for his work in and with Edwardian musical comedies and 1920s musicals. He was also an important innovator in bringing cabaret and revue to the London stage. Born in London, he took his first role on the musical stage at the age of 18 in Haste to the Wedding (1892), a West End collaboration between his songwriter and actor father and W. S. Gilbert.

Grossmith soon became an audience favourite playing "dude" roles – fashionable but unserious characters. Early appearances in musicals included George Edwardes's hit A Gaiety Girl in 1893, and Go-Bang and The Shop Girl in 1894. In 1895, Grossmith left the musical stage, instead appearing in straight comedies, but after a few years he returned to performing in musicals and Victorian burlesques. Early in the new century, he had a string of successes in musicals for Edwardes, including The Toreador (1901), The School Girl (1903), The Orchid (1903), The Spring Chicken (1905), The New Aladdin (1906), The Girls of Gottenberg (1907), Our Miss Gibbs (1909), Peggy (1911), The Sunshine Girl (1912) and The Girl on the Film (1913). The lanky Grossmith was often paired with the diminutive Edmund Payne. At the same time, he developed a reputation as a co-writer of musicals and revues, often adding jokes into others' librettos.

Grossmith established himself as a major producer, together with Edward Laurillard, of such hits as To-Night's the Night (1914), Theodore & Co (1916) and Yes, Uncle! (1917). He wrote the long-running revue series that began with The Bing Boys Are Here (1916), scheduling these projects around his naval service in the First World War. He produced, co-wrote, directed and sometimes starred in, Kissing Time (1919), A Night Out (1920), Sally (1921), The Cabaret Girl (1922), The Beauty Prize (1923) and Primrose (1924). He also continued to appear in other producers' shows, including The Naughty Princess (1920) and No, No, Nanette (1925).

Later he performed in such pieces as Princess Charming (1926) and began a film career in 1930, both as an actor and, from 1932, chairman of London Film Productions Ltd.

== Life and career ==
=== Early years ===
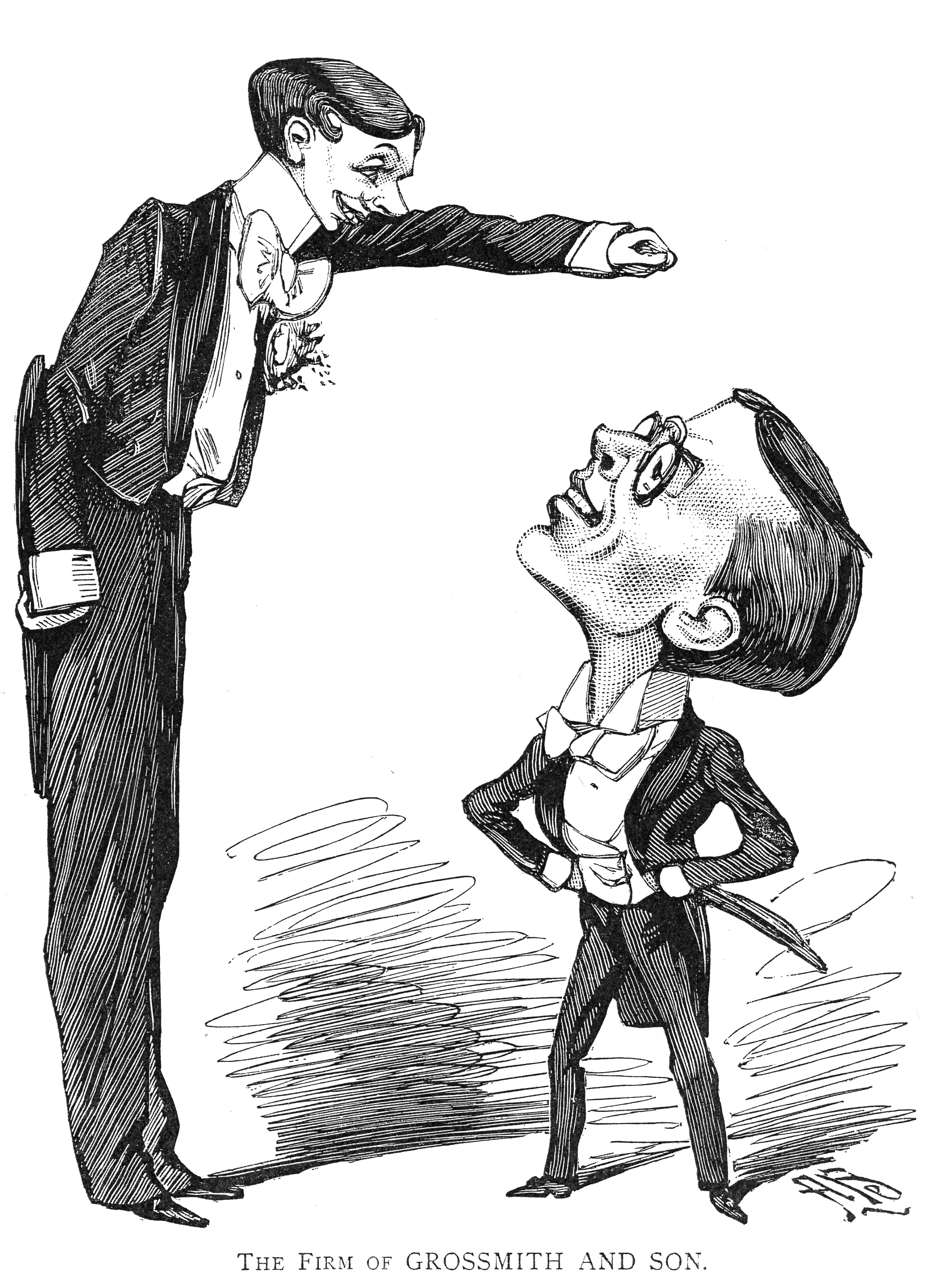
"The Firm of Grossmith and Son"

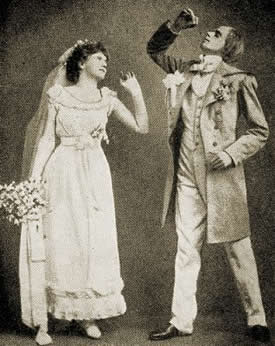
Début, in Haste to the Wedding, with Marie Studholme, 1892

George Grossmith was born in Chalk Farm, London, on 11 May 1874, the eldest child and elder son of the future Gilbert and Sullivan star George Grossmith and his wife, Emmeline Rosa, née Noyce. His brother Lawrence was an actor. Grossmith studied at University College School in London. His parents discouraged his interest in the theatre and he was intended for an army career. He twice failed the entry examination to the Royal Military College, Sandhurst because of his poor command of French; when he was seventeen his father took him to Paris, established him at the Hôtel Continental and left him to learn the language. He became so fluent that he was later able to perform in French to Parisian audiences.

Despite his parents' misgivings, at the age of eighteen Grossmith accepted W. S. Gilbert's invitation to play a small part in Haste to the Wedding, an operatic adaptation by Gilbert of an old French comedy, The Italian Straw Hat, with new music by Grossmith's father. It had only a short run, in July and August 1892, but the young Grossmith was set on a stage career, and later in the year he appeared in comic operas at the Royalty and Comedy Theatres. At the Shaftesbury Theatre in April 1893 he played Lord Percy Pimpleton in Morocco Bound, described as "a musical farcical comedy". In this piece he gave his first performance in what has variously been termed a "silly ass", "dude", "masher" or "knut" role, with which he was much associated during his subsequent stage career. (Note: The Oxford English Dictionary defines "dude" as "a man who shows an ostentatious regard for fashion and style in regard to dress or appearance; a dandy, a fop"; a "masher" as "A fashionable young man of the late Victorian or Edwardian era, esp. one fond of the company of women"; and a "knut" as "a fashionable or showy young man") The show was a success, running for 295 performances; the biographer Kurt Gänzl records that Grossmith polished and augmented his small part during the run "with extra sight and word gags until his performance became one of the most prominent and popular features of the entertainment". Forty years later Grossmith recalled, "I introduced impromptu idiotic stories and conundrums every time I came on the stage [with] an assurance that made me 'gag' and invent things on the stage I should never have the courage for to-day".

In 1895, at the fashionable church St George's, Hanover Square, Grossmith married Gertrude Elizabeth "Cissie" Rudge, a burlesque and musical comedy actress whose stage name was Adelaide Astor. She was one of the Rudge Sisters – five actresses of whom Letty Lind was the best-known. Grossmith and his wife had three children, the eldest of whom, Ena Sylvia Victoria (1896–1944), became a stage and film actress, George (1906–c. 2000) became a theatrical manager; and the youngest was Rosa Mary (1907–1988), whose son was John George.

=== West End and Broadway ===
Grossmith quickly established himself as a favourite with audiences. He had little singing voice, but could put a song across nonetheless and he was known for his easy comic grace on stage. His colleague Seymour Hicks described him as "clever George Grossmith Jr, with a face hardly less extraordinary than his curious legs and a humour as unctuous as his father's at his best". Hicks added that Grossmith, by his example, improved men's standards of dress. Morocco Bound was followed by further West End appearances in Go-Bang (1894 as Augustus Fitzpoop) and in George Edwardes's production of A Gaiety Girl (1894 as Major Barclay), which ran for 413 performances. Edwardes then engaged Grossmith to create the part of Bertie Boyd in the even more successful musical The Shop Girl (1894). Also in the cast was Edmund Payne, a diminutive comic actor with whom, for comedic effect, the tall, lanky Grossmith would be paired in many Edwardian musical comedies. The twenty-year-old Grossmith wrote the lyrics to his character's song "Beautiful, bountiful Bertie" (music by Lionel Monckton), which he popularised in both London and New York. It became so popular that Grossmith senior included in his solo show at St James's Hall a comic impersonation of Grossmith junior singing it. Grossmith eventually appeared in some 20 Edwardes productions, often interpolating his own songs into the shows.

Away from musical comedy, Grossmith appeared at the Vaudeville Theatre in 1896, as a young philosophy student, Maxime, in A Night Out, an English adaptation of Georges Feydeau's farce L'Hôtel du libre échange. The Era commented, "Mr Geo Grossmith, jun added another admirable portrait to his gallery of brainless young men". He played in a range of shows between then and 1901, some musical and some not. He was co-author of two of them – Great Caesar (1899), a burlesque with music by Paul Rubens; and The Gay Pretenders (1900), a comic opera with music by Claude Nugent, which failed despite a starry cast headed by Grossmith senior. Playing a bibulous peer, Grossmith appeared with Lillie Langtry in Sydney Grundy's comedy The Degenerates in London in 1899 and in the US the following year.

With his frequent stage companion Edmund Payne in The New Aladdin, 1906

Grossmith returned to Edwardes's company in 1901 as leading comedian, touring in Kitty Grey, and then starring in The Toreador, which ran for 676 performances at the Gaiety Theatre. He played what The Stage described as "a vivacious booby of the 'chappie' order ... a very diverting figure, the best sketch by far of its kind he has given". In Edwardes's next show, The School Girl (1903), he took over from G. P. Huntley as Sir Ormesby St Leger, and subsequently toured the US in the piece.

By this time Grossmith was establishing himself as a writer as well as an actor. He wrote the librettos for Gulliver's Travels, (Garrick, 1902, adapted from Swift's book) and The Love Birds (Savoy, 1904), both of which had modest runs. The latter was produced by Edward Laurillard, who later became Grossmith's business partner. The Spring Chicken (Gaiety, 1905), for which Grossmith wrote the book, was the first of his many adaptations of French plays. Based on Coquin de Printemps by Adolphe Jaime and Georges Duval, it had music by Ivan Caryll and Monckton and lyrics by Adrian Ross and Percy Greenbank. Grossmith took the leading role of Gustave Barbori; the piece ran for 374 performances; Grossmith, as became his frequent practice, handed his role on to another player during the run.

Over the first dozen years of the 20th century, Grossmith starred in a succession of Edwardian musical comedy hits at the Gaiety, and became one of the biggest stars of the Edwardian era. As well as Gustave his roles included the Hon Guy Scrymgeour in The Orchid (1903), Genie of the Lamp in The New Aladdin (1906), Prince Otto in The Girls of Gottenberg (1907), Hughie in Our Miss Gibbs (1909), Auberon Blow in Peggy (1911), for which he also wrote the book, and Lord Bicester in The Sunshine Girl (1912). These seven shows ran for an average of 383 performances. He wrote the book to another Gaiety musical, Havana (1908), and often added jokes to books in his collaborations with other writers.

Grossmith was a pioneer of revue in the West End. He wrote or co-wrote, and sometimes directed, more than a dozen between 1905 and 1914, from Rogues and Vagabonds at the Empire to Not Likely at the Alhambra. He also appeared in revue in Paris at the Folies Bergère in 1910 and at the Théâtre Réjane in 1911. In the latter's Revue Sans-Gêne ("The Unabashed Revue") he starred alongside Réjane herself and Charles Lamy, gaining the praise of Les Annales du théâtre et de la musique and "all those – and they were more numerous than ever – who declared themselves fond of this kind of very Parisian show". (Note: Tous ceux et ils étaient plus nombreux que jamais qui se déclaraient friands de ce genre de spectacle bien parisien.)

Grossmith's last visit to the US before the First World War was in December 1913, when he played Max Daly in The Girl on the Film at the Shubert Theatre, New York, having played the part in London earlier in the year. By this time Edwardes was ailing; Grossmith joined Laurillard to co-produce comedies and musical shows in the Edwardes tradition. Their first production was Potash and Perlmutter, which opened at the Queen's Theatre in London in April 1914 and ran for 665 performances.

The Toreador, 1901

With Edmund Payne in Our Miss Gibbs, 1909

Impersonating Thomas Edison in revue, 1911

In The Girl on the Film, with Kitty Mason, 1913

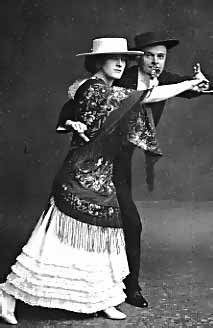
In The Sunshine Girl, 1912, with Phyllis Dare

=== First World War ===
Grossmith played the Hon Dudley Mitton in To-Night's the Night – a musical comedy based on the farce Les Dominos roses by Alfred Hennequin and Alfred Delacour – which he and Laurillard presented on Broadway in 1914 and in London the following year. His last stage role before the end of the war – other than one-off appearances in charity shows – was the shady Lord Theodore Wragge in Theodore and Co, at the Gaiety. It was adapted by Grossmith and H. M. Harwood from a French farce, had music by Ivor Novello and Jerome Kern and ran for more than 500 performances from September 1916. After the initial weeks of the run Grossmith handed the role to Austin Melford, one of his many protégés, and joined the armed forces.

Grossmith in naval uniform, by Weedon Grossmith, 1917

In 1916 Grossmith was commissioned in the Royal Naval Volunteer Reserve and later served with the Royal Naval armoured cars. A portrait of him in uniform by his uncle, Weedon Grossmith, was exhibited at the Royal Academy in 1917. Although wartime service mostly kept him off the stage until 1919, he was able to continue with his work as producer and writer. Together with Fred Thomson he adapted Rip and Jacques Bousquet's 1912 comedy Les fils Touffe sont à Paris ("The Touffe Brothers Are in Paris") as The Bing Boys Are Here, which ran at the Alhambra Theatre for 378 performances from April 1916. The two followed this with The Bing Girls Are There, The Other Bing Boys (both 1917) and The Bing Boys on Broadway (1918), which ran for 562 performances.

In addition to their London productions, Grossmith and Laurillard sent touring companies round the British provinces. In one of them John Le Hay led the cast in Potash and Perlmuter, and Grossmith selected the young and little-known Jack Buchanan for the role of Dudley Mitton in a two-year national tour of To-Night's the Night, giving him helpful advice about performing and setting him on his way to stardom as, in many ways, Grossmith's successor. Grossmith was well known as a talent spotter: among those to whom he gave opportunities early in their careers in addition to Kern, were Novello and Noël Coward as both actors and writers.

After Edwardes died in 1915 Alfred Butt gained control of the Gaiety, obliging Grossmith and Laurillard to stage their London productions at other theatres. They commissioned a new theatre – the Winter Garden, on the site of an old music-hall in Drury Lane. Until it was ready they took the Prince of Wales (Mr Manhattan, 1916, 221 performances, and Yes, Uncle!, 1917, 626 performances) and the Shaftesbury (Arlette, 1917, 200 performances). They had a relative failure with Oh, Joy!, a version of the Broadway hit Oh, Boy! (1917), at the Kingsway Theatre in January 1919: despite a libretto by Guy Bolton and P. G. Wodehouse and a score by Kern this "musical peace piece" ran for only 167 performances in London.

=== Post-war ===
The Winter Garden Theatre, Drury Lane, 1919

With Joseph Coyne (l) in No, No, Nanette, 1925

The Winter Garden opened in May 1919 with the musical Kissing Time. The plot was adapted by Bolton and Wodehouse from the 1910 play, Madame et son filleul ("Madame and her Godson") by Maurice Hennequin, Pierre Véber and Henry de Gorsse. It ran for 430 performances and The Observer calculated that a million people saw the show during the thirteen months of its run. The next year, Grossmith adapted a play he has appeared in a quarter of a century earlier as the musical A Night Out, with music by Willie Redstone and some songs by Cole Porter. The partnership with Laurillard expanded, and at various times controlled not only the Winter Garden but also the Apollo, Adelphi, His Majesty's and the Shaftesbury theatres. In 1921 the partnership was amicably dissolved, leaving Grossmith in control of the Winter Garden, where, until 1926, he went into a producing partnership with Pat Malone, formerly chief lieutenant to Edwardes, also often co-writing and directing the shows. During this time, Grossmith also worked as a programme adviser to the BBC, particularly involved in comedy programming.

Wodehouse and Bolton collaborated extensively with Grossmith after the First World War and knew him well. Wodehouse enjoyed working with him, used him as a model for the character of Bertie Wooster, and dedicated one of his novels to him: "We had a lot of fun ... not a reproach or nasty word from start to finish". But Wodehouse privately thought Grossmith unwise to hanker after romantic aristocratic roles and felt he should stick to being "a brilliant light comedian". For Wodehouse, Grossmith was "a priceless snob, but the looking-up kind, not the looking-down. ... George reads himself to sleep with Burke's Peerage, but he'll go pub-crawling with the stage doorman". Bolton recalled Grossmith auditioning a young chorine who, when told that she must sing as part of the audition, chose the British national anthem, thereby obliging him and all others present to rise loyally to their feet and remain at attention while she petulantly insisted on singing all the countless verses of God Save the King: "The national anthem is sacrosanct – especially if you’re an actor-manager clinging to the hope of a belated knighthood". (Note: In Grove's Dictionary of Music and Musicians, Leon Berger writes that Grossmith was offered a knighthood but died before it could be conferred.)

At the Adelphi, in October 1920, Grossmith played Prince Ladislas in the opéra bouffe The Naughty Princess, which ran for 268 performances. At the Winter Garden in September 1921 he played Otis Hooper in Sally, a musical comedy by Bolton, Kern and Clifford Grey that ran for 387 performances. In September 1922 he played Mr Gripps in The Cabaret Girl by Grossmith, Wodehouse and Kern, which ran for 361 performances. After these three musical shows he ventured into straight drama, playing the title role in a revival of Pinero's The Gay Lord Quex at His Majesty's in April and May 1923.

Returning to the Winter Garden in September 1923, Grossmith played Flutey Warboy in The Beauty Prize, of which he was co-author with Wodehouse and for which Kern again wrote the music. It was less popular than their previous show and closed after 213 performances. Grossmith revived To-Night's the Night in 1924, reprising his old role of Dudley Mitton, and later in the year he played Blond in The Royal Visitor, an adaptation of a comedy popular in France but in London, despite the presence of Oscar Asche and Yvonne Arnaud in the cast, it closed after nine performances. After this failure Grossmith had one of the biggest successes of his career, in the British premiere of No, No, Nanette (1925), in the role of Billy Early. The show ran for 665 performances; Grossmith characteristically handed the part over to his understudy during the run. According to musical theatre writer Andrew Lamb, Grossmith "played a particular part in introducing American songs and American musical shows into the British musical theatre."

=== Last years ===
With Alice Delysia in Princess Charming, 1926

From 1926 Grossmith no longer produced shows but continued to act, appearing in five more musical productions. In October 1926 he played King Christian II of Sylvania in Princess Charming, which ran for 362 performances at the Palace Theatre. Grossmith's next role was "Hatpin" Pinge in Lady Mary, a musical comedy with a book by Frederick Lonsdale and Hastings Turner, music by Albert Szirmai and Kern and lyrics by Harry Graham. The reviewer in The Stage praised the character – "Debrett might be said to be his Bible, and his veneration of the aristocracy amounts almost to idolatry" – and Grossmith's performance: "There is inimitable drollery in his conception of the part of a perfect gentleman". The piece ran at Daly's Theatre for 181 performances and then toured.

At the London Hippodrome in March 1929 Grossmith played Huggins in The Five O'Clock Girl – book by Bolton and Thompson, music by Harry Ruby, and lyrics by Bert Kalmar. The show ran for 122 performances. Grossmith made his last Broadway appearances in 1930, reprising his King Christian in Princess Charming and then playing the Marquis de Chatelard in Meet My Sister. The latter piece ran for 167 performances, but when Grossmith prevailed on his old partner Laurillard to stage it in London (retitled My Sister and I) it closed after eight performances at the Shaftesbury.

Grossmith appeared in two silent films before the First World War, but his film career began in earnest in 1930. He singled out for mention in his article in Who's Who Women Everywhere, Those Three French Girls, Are You There? Service for Ladies and Wedding Rehearsal. In February 1932 he resigned the position of managing director of the Theatre Royal, Drury Lane, which he had held for a year, and became chairman of London Film Productions.

In 1933 Grossmith realised a long-held ambition and played in Shakespeare, appearing as Touchstone in As You Like It at Regent's Park Open Air Theatre. The critic in The Evening News wrote, "the well-loved 'G.G.' of immaculate musical comedy turned out to be a first class Shakespearian clown. His Touchstone was perfect, a fellow of angular attitudes and long, restless fingers". The following year Grossmith appeared in Restoration comedy, playing Horner in The Country Wife at the Ambassadors. He made his last appearance on the stage at His Majesty's during October 1934, as the tragedian Talma in a historical drama, Josephine.

In May 1935 Grossmith underwent a major operation in a London nursing home, after being taken ill some weeks earlier. There were complications after the surgery, and he died on 6 June, aged 61. After a requiem mass at St James's, Spanish Place, he was buried at Kensal Green cemetery.

== Filmography ==
As an actor

- A Gaiety Duet (1909) – Honourable Hugh
- The Argentine Tango and Other Dances (1913)
- Women Everywhere (1930) – Aristide Brown
- Those Three French Girls (1930) – Earl of Ippleton
- Are You There? (1930) – Duke of St. Pancras (aka Exit Laughing (USA))
- Service for Ladies (1932) – Mr. Westlake (aka Reserved for Ladies (USA))
- Wedding Rehearsal (1932) – Earl of Stokeshire
- The Man with the Hispano (1933) (as Georges Grossmith) – Lord Oswill (aka The Man in the Hispano-Suiza (USA))
- L'Épervier (1933) – Erik Drakton (aka Amoureux, Les (France))
- The Girl from Maxim's (1933) – The general
- The Lady of Lebanon (1934) – Le colonel Hobson
- Princess Charming (1934) – King of Aufland

As composer

- Women Everywhere (1930) (lyrics: "All the Family")

As screenwriter

- Women Everywhere (1930) (story)
- Wedding Rehearsal (1932) (story)

== Notes, references and sources ==
=== Sources ===
- Gänzl, Kurt (1994). The Encyclopedia of the Musical Theatre, Volume 1. New York: Schirmer. ISBN 978-0-02-871445-5.
- Gänzl, Kurt (2001). The Encyclopedia of the Musical Theatre, Volume 2. New York: Schirmer. ISBN 978-0-02-864970-2.
- Gaye, Freda, ed. (1967). Who's Who in the Theatre (fourteenth ed.). London: Sir Isaac Pitman and Sons. OCLC 5997224.
- Green, Benny (1981). P. G. Wodehouse: A Literary Biography. London: Pavilion. ISBN 978-0-19-281390-9.
- Hicks, Seymour (1910). Seymour Hicks: Twenty-Four Years of an Actor's Life. London: Alston Rivers. OCLC 1157229788.
- Lamb, Andrew (1985). Jerome Kern in Edwardian London. Brooklyn: Brooklyn College. ISBN 0-91-467824-8.
- Marshall, Michael (1978). Top Hat & Tails: The Story of Jack Buchanan. London: Elm Tree Books. ISBN 0-24-189602-9.
- Murphy, N. T. P. (1987) [1981]. In Search of Blandings. London: Penguin. ISBN 0-14-010299-X.
- Naylor, Stanley (1913). Gaiety and George Grossmith: Random Reflections on the Serious Business of Enjoyment. London: Stanley Paul. OCLC 15430241.
- Parker, John, ed. (1925). Who's Who in the Theatre (fifth ed.). London: Sir Isaac Pitman and Sons. OCLC 10013159.
- Parker, John, ed. (1939). Who's Who in the Theatre (ninth ed.). London: Sir Isaac Pitman and Sons. OCLC 473894893.
- Parker, John; Freda Gaye; Ian Herbert, eds. (1978). Who Was Who in the Theatre. Detroit: Gale Research. OCLC 310466458.
- Rollins, Cyril; R. John Witts (1962). The D'Oyly Carte Opera Company in Gilbert and Sullivan Operas: A Record of Productions, 1875–1961. London: Michael Joseph. OCLC 504581419.
- Stoullig, Edmond (1912). Les Annales du théâtre et de la musique, 1911 (in French). Paris: Paul Ollendorff. OCLC 1508084252.
- Wearing, J. P. (1976). The London Stage, 1890–1899: A Calendar of Plays and Players, Volume 1. Metuchen: Scarecrow Press. ISBN 0-81-080910-9.
- Wearing, J. P. (1981). The London Stage, 1900–1909: A Calendar of Plays and Players (second ed.). Metuchen: Scarecrow Press. ISBN 978-0-81-089293-4.
- Wearing, J. P. (2014). The London Stage, 1920–1929: A Calendar of Productions, Performers, and Personnel (second ed.). London: Bloomsbury. ISBN 978-0-81-089302-3.
- Wodehouse, P. G.; Guy Bolton (1980) [1954]. "Bring on the Girls". Wodehouse on Wodehouse. London: Hutchinson. ISBN 0-09-143210-3.
