= Oh, Boy! (musical) =

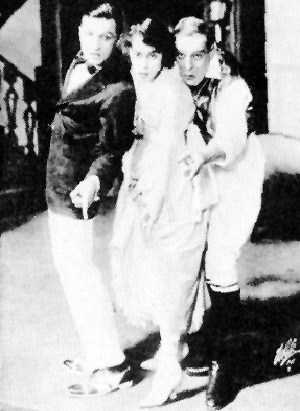
- Powers, Wheaton and Forde
- Music: Jerome Kern
- Lyrics: Guy Bolton; P. G. Wodehouse
- Book: Guy Bolton; P. G. Wodehouse
- Productions: 1917 Broadway

Oh, Boy! is a musical in two acts, with music by Jerome Kern and book and lyrics by Guy Bolton and P. G. Wodehouse. The story concerns befuddled George, who elopes with Lou Ellen, the daughter of Judge Carter. He must win over her parents and his Quaker aunt. His dapper polo champion friend Jim is in love with madcap actress Jackie, but George must hide her while she extricates herself from a scrape with a bumbling constable whom she punched at a party raid.

The piece was the most successful of the "Princess Theatre Musicals", opening in February 1917 and transferring to the Casino Theatre in November 1917 to finish its Broadway run of 463 performances. A London production, under the title Oh, Joy! opened in January 1919 at the Kingsway Theatre, where it ran for 167 performances. A silent film version was also produced in 1919.

== Background ==
Early in the 20th century, American musical theatre consisted of a mix of elaborate European operettas, like The Merry Widow (1907), British musical comedy imports, like The Arcadians (1910), George M. Cohan's shows, American operettas, like those of Victor Herbert, ragtime-infused American musicals, and the spectacular revues of Florenz Ziegfeld and others. But as Cohan and Herbert's creative output waned, new creative talent was being nurtured on Broadway, including Jerome Kern, George Gershwin, Irving Berlin and Sigmund Romberg. Kern began by revising British musicals to suit American audiences, adding songs that "have a timeless, distinctly American sound that redefined the Broadway showtune."

The Princess Theatre was a simply designed, 299-seat Broadway theatre that had failed to attract successful productions because of its small size. Theatre agent Elisabeth Marbury asked Kern and Bolton to write a series of musicals specifically tailored to its smaller setting, with an intimate style and modest budgets, that would provide an alternative to the star-studded extravaganzas of Ziegfeld and others. Kern and Bolton's first Princess Theatre musical was Nobody's Home (1915), an adaptation of a London show called Mr. Popple of Ippleton. Their second was an original musical called Very Good Eddie (1915). The little show ran for 314 performances on a modest budget. British humorist and lyricist/playwright P. G. Wodehouse had supplied some lyrics for Very Good Eddie but now joined the team at the Princess.

Oh, Boy!, like the first two Princess Theatre shows, featured modern American settings and simple scene changes (one set for each act) to more aptly suit the small theatre, eschewing operetta traditions of foreign locales and elaborate scenery. The authors deliberately attempted to have the humor flow from the plot situations, rather than from musical set pieces. In 1918, Dorothy Parker described in Vanity Fair how the Princess Theatre shows integrated story and music: "Bolton and Wodehouse and Kern are my favorite indoor sport. I like the way they go about a musical comedy. ... I like the way the action slides casually into the songs. ... I like the deft rhyming of the song that is always sung in the last act by two comedians and a comedienne. And oh, how I do like Jerome Kern's music." It became the most successful of the Princess Theatre shows, and one of the first American musicals to be a success on the London stage. According to Bloom and Vlastnik, Oh, Boy! represents "the transition from the haphazard musicals of the past to the newer, more methodical modern musical comedy ... the libretto is remarkably pun-free and the plot is natural and unforced. Charm was uppermost in the creators' minds ... the audience could relax, have a few laughs, feel slightly superior to the silly undertakings on stage, and smile along with the simple, melodic, lyrically witty but undemanding songs". They call it good clean fun and "honest, non-ironic, hardworking theatre".

Oh, Boy! was first performed, as a tryout, in Schenectady, New York, before receiving its Broadway premiere on February 20, 1917 at the Princess Theatre. It ran for 463 performances (the last few months at the Casino Theatre), making it the third-longest running Broadway musical in the 1910s. It was produced by William Elliott and F. Ray Comstock. Staging was by Edward Royce, with scenery by D. M. Aiken and costumes by Faibsey. A London production, under the title Oh, Joy! was produced by George Grossmith, Jr., containing some modified lyrics, and starring Beatrice Lillie as Jackie – her first role in a book musical. It opened on January 27, 1919 at the Kingsway Theatre, where it ran for 167 performances. A silent film version was also produced in 1919. An anonymous admirer wrote a verse in praise of the musical's authors that begins:

This is the trio of musical fame,
Bolton and Wodehouse and Kern.
Better than anyone else you can name
Bolton and Wodehouse and Kern.

== Synopsis ==
=== Act One ===
The telegram boy arrives at George Budd's apartment at Medowsides, Long Island, and Briggs, George's butler, puts the telegram aside. Jim Marvin, a young dandy, enters through the window followed by a troupe of young people ("Let's Make a Night of It"). Jim's polo team has won a silver cup, and he's brought all his friends to George's house to celebrate. Jim is surprised to find that George is not home; George never goes out at night. However, Jim decides to continue the party and goes into the dining room with his friends to find some food and drink.

Powers (George) and Lillie (Jackie), 1919 London production

George is not home because he has eloped with Lou Ellen Carter. They return to the apartment ready to spend their first night together ("You Never Knew About Me"), not realizing they have guests. They go into the bedroom, and Jim and his friends return to the living room, not knowing George is home with Lou Ellen. Jim rhapsodizes on the wonders of an available female ("A Package of Seeds"). George and Lou Ellen overhear the noisy guests and open the door. They see no one, as everyone is now in the dining room, but George notices the telegram. It is from his Quaker Aunt Penelope, who controls his portion of the family fortune. She cautions him not to become engaged to Lou Ellen without careful consideration and tells him that she is coming to visit. George and Lou Ellen decide that Lou Ellen will have to go back to her parents for a while. Lou Ellen tries to sneak out through the party by pretending that she is one of the partiers. The girls ask her to go with them to their next party, but she explains that she is "An Old-Fashioned Wife". The landlord insists that the party must end, and everyone leaves, as George and Lou Ellen go to find a taxi to take her home.

Jim is left alone in the apartment when a pretty girl with a gun enters and explains she is escaping from the police. She is an actress named Jackie Sampson, and she was at a party at the Cherrywood Inn when a tipsy old gentleman named Tootles made a pass at her. He climbed on a table to read a speech, got into an altercation with a constable and started a riot. In the confusion, Jackie lost her handbag and gave the policeman a black eye. The policeman, P. C. Simms, has come to arrest her, but Jim tells him Jackie is George's wife. Jim offers to go back to the cabaret, find her handbag, and make Tootles absolve Jackie of any blame. Jackie thanks him ("A Pal Like You"), and they decide she should spend the night at George's to support her alibi. George can stay at Jim's place. She puts on Lou Ellen's pajamas. George returns and begins a letter to Lou Ellen ("Letter Song: I'll Just Dream About You") when Jackie emerges from the bedroom and explains her situation. George agrees to let her stay, and when Simms returns, George shows him the wedding certificate to prove he is married and reintroduces him to Jackie, who is still wearing the pajamas. Simms decides everything is in order and leaves, and Jackie can stay "Till the Clouds Roll By". George spends the night on Jim's sofa.

When George returns home in the morning, Lou Ellen's father, Judge Carter, has come to see if George is a suitable son-in-law. Jim has invited more of his friends to George's apartment, and the Judge finds it hard to believe George is really a serious young man. George invents a story about unstable explosives that frightens Judge Carter away. A flapper sings and dances for George ("A Little Bit of Ribbon") before Jackie emerges. Meanwhile, Jim could not find Tootles or the handbag, but he has found Tootles's speech. Briggs goes to the train station to waylay Aunt Penelope. Lou Ellen and her mother arrive and are shocked at the apparently immoral behavior going on in the apartment. When Jackie accidentally mentions that she has stayed there all night, George tells them she is his Aunt Penelope. Jackie tries to convince them she is a Quaker ("The First Day in May"). Judge Carter returns, and Jackie recognizes him as Tootles! She decides to follow him to the Country Club, where he is going to give his speech for the Polo Trophy. Hopefully he'll be able to clear her name with the police and get her handbag back.

=== Act Two ===
Scene from the London production, 1919

At the Medowsides Country Club, Jim and his friends begin the trophy ceremony with a song ("Koo-La-Loo"). Briggs is frantically searching for George. He tried to lock Aunt Penelope in the kitchen, but she punched him in the eye and escaped. When George and Jackie arrive, Simms greets them as Mr. and Mrs. Budd and asks them where Jackie got her pajamas; he would like to get a pair for his wife. Jackie tells Jim that even though she is becoming fond of George, she also likes him ("Rolled Into One"). Mrs. Carter dislikes George and persuades her husband to forbid Lou Ellen to speak to him ("Oh Daddy, Please").

Jackie tells the judge that she will give him his speech if he will get her handbag back from Simms. Jim asks Jackie to think about marrying him ("Nesting Time in Flatbush"). Jackie orders a strong drink to fortify her to be George's wife, his aunt, and a flapper simultaneously. Lou Ellen is despondent because she cannot speak to George, but she reassures herself that "Words Are Not Needed". Aunt Penelope arrives, and Simms tells her George and Jackie are married; he saw her in pajamas. Aunt Penelope feels faint and asks for a glass of water but accidentally takes Jackie's drink. Soon inebriated, she asks George about the pajamas, and he sends her to the ladies' room. Jackie, Jim, and George sing an extemporaneous piece about "Flubby Dub the Caveman." Lou Ellen meets Aunt Penelope in the ladies' room, and Aunt Penelope tells her about the pajamas. Lou Ellen asks her mother to make George explain who was wearing her pajamas and who Jackie is, since Aunt Penelope is George's aunt.

Aunt Penelope spots Briggs and declares that he is a madman who tried to lock her up. Simms jumps at the chance to arrest him and rushes to empty his hands, giving Jackie's handbag to Judge Carter. Judge Carter and Jackie exchange the handbag and the speech. Aunt Penelope demands an explanation: did she dream all the strange happenings, and is George really married? George explains to everyone that he is married to Lou Ellen. Simms is thoroughly confused, but George tells him that Jackie is Jim Marvin's wife, and it is quite certain that she soon will be.

== Songs ==
Act I

- Let's Make a Night of It - Jim Marvin and Ensemble
- You Never Knew About Me - Lou Ellen Carter and George Budd
- A Package of Seeds (from 90 in the Shade - Lyrics by Herbert Reynolds and Wodehouse) - Marvin, Jane Packard, Polly Andrus and Girls
- An Old-Fashioned Wife - Carter and Girls
- A Pal Like You (We're Going to Be Pals) - Jackie Sampson and Marvin
- Till the Clouds Roll By (Lyrics by Kern and Wodehouse) - Sampson and Budd
- A Little Bit of Ribbon - Packard and Girls
- The First Day of May - Sampson, Marvin and Budd

Act II

- Koo-La-Loo - Marvin and Ensemble
- Rolled into One - Sampson
- Oh, Daddy, Please! - Lou Ellen Carter, Budd and Judge Daniel Carter
- Nesting Time (in Flatbush) (Lyrics by Kern and Wodehouse) - Sampson and Marvin
- Words Are Not Needed (Every Day) - Lou Ellen Carter and Boys
- Flubby Dub, the Cave-Man - Sampson, Marvin and Budd

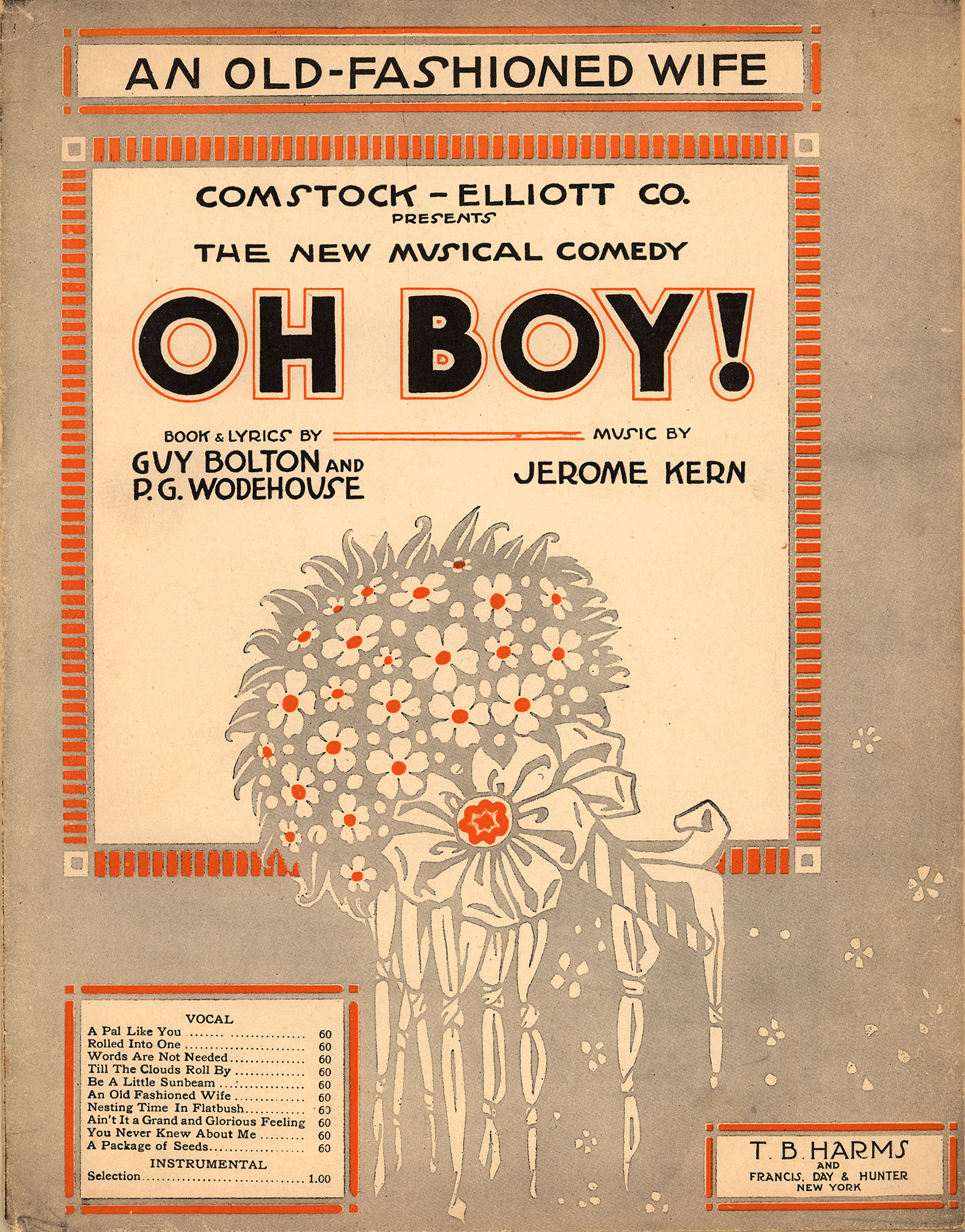
Sheet music cover

== Roles and original cast ==
- George Budd – Tom Powers
- Lou Ellen Carter (his new wife) – Marie Carroll
- Jim Marvin (his friend) – Hal Forde
- Jackie Sampson (an actress) – Anna Wheaton
- Briggs, George's butler – Carl Lyle
- Judge Daniel Carter – Frank McGinn
- Mrs. Carter – Augusta Haviland
- Miss Penelope Budd (George's aunt) – Edna May Oliver
- Constable Simms – Stephen Maley
- Jane Packard – Marion Davies
- Polly Andrus – Justine Johnstone

Tom Powers reprised the role of George Budd in the 1919 London production, Oh, Joy! which also starred Beatrice Lillie as Jackie.
