= Gillian Lynne Theatre =

West End theatre in London

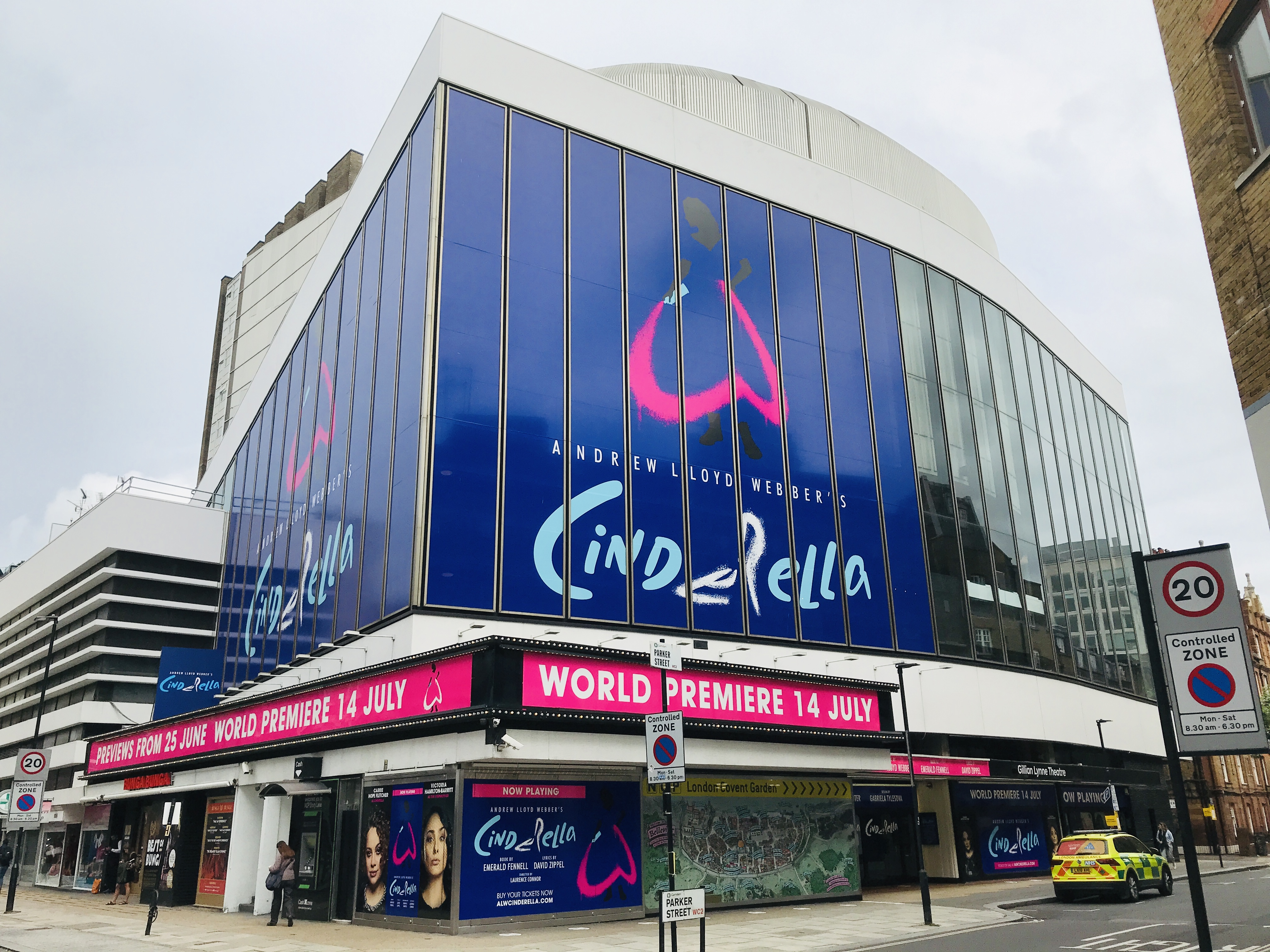
- The Gillian Lynne Theatre (July 2021)
- Interactive map of Gillian Lynne Theatre
- Former names: New London Theatre (1973–2018)
- Address: 166 Drury Lane; Holborn, London, WC2B 5PW; United Kingdom
- Coordinates: 51°30′55″N 00°07′21″W
- Owner: LW Theatres
- Capacity: 1,118 on 2 levels
- Type: West End theatre
- Production: My Neighbour Totoro
- Public transit: Holborn

Construction
- Opened: 2 January 1973; 53 years ago
- Rebuilt: 1911 (Frank Matcham)
- Architect: Paul Tvrtkovic

Website
- lwtheatres.co.uk/theatres/gillian-lynne/

The Gillian Lynne Theatre (formerly the New London Theatre) is a West End theatre located on the corner of Drury Lane and Parker Street in Holborn in the London Borough of Camden. The Winter Garden Theatre occupied the site until 1965. On 1 May 2018, the theatre was officially renamed the Gillian Lynne Theatre in honour of choreographer Gillian Lynne. It is the first theatre in the West End of London to be named after a non-royal woman.

== Previous buildings ==
The modern theatre is built on the site of previous taverns and music hall theatres, where a place of entertainment has been located since Elizabethan times. Nell Gwynn was associated with the tavern, which became known as the Great Mogul by the end of the 17th century, and presented entertainments in an adjoining hall, including "glee clubs" and "sing-songs". The Mogul Saloon was built on the site in 1847, which was sometimes known as the "Turkish Saloon" or the "Mogul Music Hall." In 1851, it became the Middlesex Music Hall, known as The Old Mo. This in turn was rebuilt as the New Middlesex Theatre of Varieties in 1911 by Frank Matcham for Oswald Stoll.

In 1919, the theatre was sold to George Grossmith Jr. and Edward Laurillard, refurbished and reopened as the Winter Garden Theatre. They produced Kissing Time (1919, with a book by P. G. Wodehouse and Guy Bolton and music by Ivan Caryll), followed by A Night Out (1920), both starring Stanley Holloway. Grossmith and Laurillard also became managers of the Apollo Theatre in 1920. However, expanding their operation caused Grossmith and Laurillard to end their partnership, with Grossmith retaining control of the Winter Garden.

Grossmith then partnered with George Edwardes's former associate, Pat Malone, to produce a series of mostly adaptations of imported shows at the Winter Garden between 1920 and 1926: Sally (1921), The Cabaret Girl (1922, with book by Wodehouse and music by Jerome Kern), The Beauty Prize (1923, with Wodehouse and Kern), a revival of Tonight's the Night (1923), Primrose (1924, with music by George Gershwin), Tell Me More (1925, with words by Thompson and music by George Gershwin) and Kid Boots (1926 with music by Harry Tierney), many of them featuring Leslie Henson. Grossmith co-wrote some of the Winter Garden pieces, directed many of his own productions and starred in several, notably as Otis in Sally. Several of the later productions lost money, and Grossmith and Malone ended the partnership.

The Vagabond King was produced here in 1927, and in 1929, Fred and Adele Astaire starred in Funny Face. In 1930, Sophie Tucker played in the Vivian Ellis musical Follow a Star, and in 1931, Gracie Fields appeared here in Walk This Way. In 1933, the theatre hosted Lewis Casson in George Bernard Shaw's On the Rocks, followed in 1935 by Love on the Dole, starring Wendy Hiller. The theatre was temporarily closed in the late 1930s, reopening in 1942. In 1945, it hosted a Donald Wolfit season, and in 1953, Agatha Christie's Witness for the Prosecution played there. 1956 saw The Water Gypsies by Vivian Ellis and A P Herbert; Hotel Paradiso starring Alec Guinness, Douglas Byng, Irene Worth and Billie Whitelaw; and Tyrone Power starred in George Bernard Shaw's The Devil's Disciple. 1958 included The Iceman Cometh.

The theatre closed permanently in 1959, when it was sold to a developer by The Rank Organisation. It was then gutted and remained vacant until 1965 when it demolished, to be replaced in 1973 by the current building.

== New London and Gillian Lynne ==
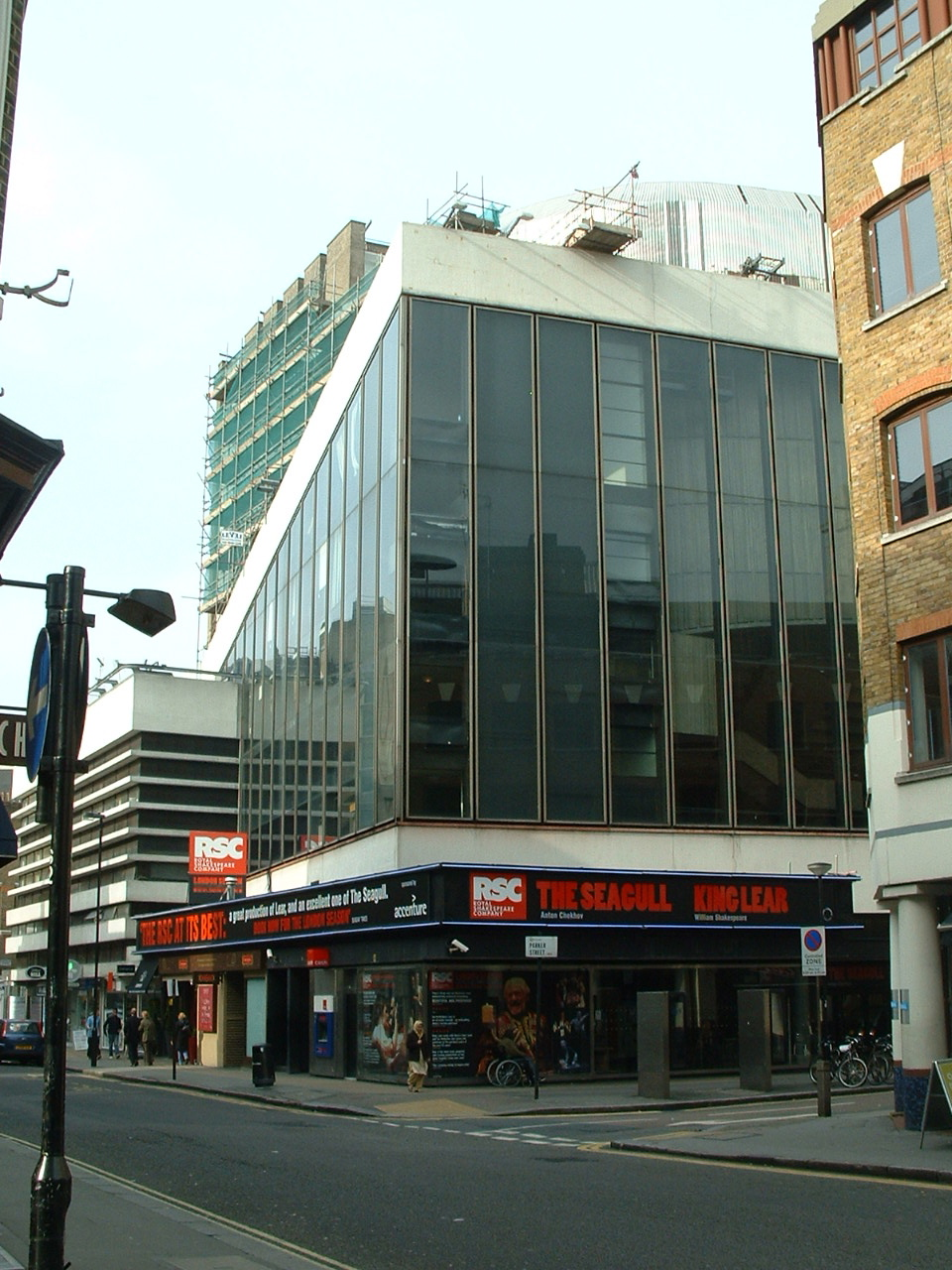
The New London Theatre (2007)

Designed by architect Paul Tvrtkovic and scenic designer Sean Kenny (Blitz!, Oliver!, Pickwick (musical)), modelled after the Walter Gropius Total-Theater, and seating 960 on 2 levels, the theatre's auditorium first opened with a television recording of Marlene Dietrich's one-woman show. The theatre officially opened on 2 January 1973 with a production of The Unknown Soldier and His Wife starring Peter Ustinov. It then hosted Grease, starring Richard Gere as Danny and Elaine Paige as Sandy. Beginning in 1977, the theatre was used as a television studio for several years and then returned to use as a theatre. The theatre's biggest hit was the Andrew Lloyd Webber and Trevor Nunn musical Cats, choreographed by Gillian Lynne which premièred in the theatre on 11 May 1981. Closing in 2002, this production became the then longest running musical in West End history, although it has since been overtaken by Phantom of the Opera and Les Misérables.

The theatre also hosted the 1977 BBC Sports Personality of the Year and the Masters snooker between 1976 and 1978. In 1977, the theatre hosted the BBC's A Song For Europe contest, the preliminary heat to choose the UK entry for the Eurovision Song Contest. However, the show was blacked out on TV due to a last minute strike by technicians. The music video for the song "We Are the Champions" by Queen was shot there in October 1977, following a 70-minute concert.

Between 2003 and September 2005, the theatre hosted Bill Kenwright's revival of Andrew Lloyd Webber's musical Joseph and the Amazing Technicolor Dreamcoat. The venue played host to the London transfer of the off-Broadway production, Blue Man Group, which closed in June 2007 to make way for the Royal Shakespeare Company's repertory productions of The Seagull and King Lear, starring Ian McKellen. In spring 2008, a new musical adaptation of Gone with the Wind ran for only two months. New musical Imagine This closed after only being open for one month.

The National Theatre production of War Horse transferred into the theatre from 28 March 2009, where it stayed until 12 March 2016, after over 3,000 performances.

The theatre was home to the Sheffield Crucible's production of the musical Show Boat, which opened on 9 April 2016. Despite positive reviews, the production closed early, on 27 August 2016. On 22 October 2016, the London production of Andrew Lloyd Webber's School of Rock opened, direct from Broadway, and closed after a three-and-a-half-year run, before the theatre underwent a refurbishment.

Lloyd Webber's Cinderella had its world premiere on 14 July 2021, with previews starting on 25 June. The opening, originally scheduled for August 2020, was delayed due to the COVID-19 pandemic. The production closed on 12 June 2022.

Following seasons at the Leeds Playhouse, the Bridge Theatre, and a UK and Ireland tour, the new adaptation of The Lion, The Witch, and The Wardrobe by C. S. Lewis opened at the theatre from 18 July 2022, running until 9 January 2023. The 2022 Chichester Festival production of Crazy for You was scheduled to play at the theatre for a limited 30-week West End engagement beginning 24 June 2023, prior to an official opening on 3 July.

The production of My Neighbour Totoro transferred to the theatre in March 2025, with the original 34 week run being extended to January 2027

The theatre has been owned since 1991 by Lloyd Webber's Really Useful Group. The theatre building also contains an underground car park, a cabaret venue, a basement nightclub, shops, and a residential tower. In 2014, Lloyd Webber reorganized the group; the entity that owns the theatre is Really Useful Theatres.

== Recent and present productions ==
- Cats (11 May 1981 – 11 May 2002) music by Andrew Lloyd Webber from T. S. Eliot's Old Possum's Book of Practical Cats, starring Elaine Paige
- Umoja (6 September 2002 – 8 February 2003)
- Joseph and the Amazing Technicolor Dreamcoat (3 March 2003 – 3 September 2005) lyrics by Tim Rice, music by Andrew Lloyd Webber, starring Stephen Gately, Ian Watkins and Darren Day
- Blue Man Group (10 November 2005 – 24 June 2007)
- King Lear and The Seagull (14 November 2007 – 12 January 2008) by, respectively, William Shakespeare and Anton Chekhov, starring Ian McKellen, Frances Barber, Romola Garai and William Gaunt (transferred from the Royal Shakespeare Company) .
- Gone with the Wind – A New Musical (22 April – 14 June 2008) by Margaret Martin and Trevor Nunn, starring Darius Danesh, Jill Paice and Edward Baker-Duly
- Imagine This (19 November – 20 December 2008) by Shuki Levy, David Goldsmith (lyricist) and Glenn Berenbeim
- War Horse (28 March 2009 – 12 March 2016) by Nick Stafford, adapted from the novel by Michael Morpurgo (transferred from the National Theatre)
- Show Boat (9 April – 27 August 2016) book by Oscar Hammerstein II, lyrics by Hammerstein and P. G. Wodehouse, music by Jerome Kern (transferred from Crucible Theatre Sheffield)
- School of Rock (22 October 2016 – 1 March 2020) book by Julian Fellowes, lyrics by Glenn Slater, music by Andrew Lloyd Webber
- Cinderella (18 August 2021 – 12 June 2022) book by Emerald Fennell, lyrics by David Zippel, music by Andrew Lloyd Webber
- The Lion, The Witch, and The Wardrobe (18 July 2022 – 8 January 2023) based on the book by C S Lewis
- The Lehman Trilogy (14 January – 20 May 2023) by Stefano Massini, adapted by Ben Power, directed by Sam Mendes, starring Nigel Lindsay, Hadley Fraser, Michael Balogun (transferred from National Theatre)
- Crazy for You (24 June – 31 December 2023), music and lyrics by George Gershwin and Ira Gershwin, book by Ken Ludwig, choreographed and directed by Susan Stroman, starring Charlie Stemp, Carly Anderson and Tom Edden (transferred from Chichester Festival Theatre)
- Standing at the Sky's Edge (8 February – 3 August 2024), is an Olivier Award-winning musical with music and lyrics by Richard Hawley and a book by Chris Bush (transferred from Crucible Theatre, Sheffield and National Theatre)
- The Wizard of Oz (15 August – 8 September 2024), with new songs by Andrew Lloyd Webber and Tim Rice, directed by Nikolai Foster
- The Lehman Trilogy (24 September 2024 – 5 January 2025) by Stefano Massini, adapted by Ben Power, directed by Sam Mendes, starring John Heffernan, Aaron Krohn and Howard W. Overshown (transferred from National Theatre)
- Royal Shakespeare Company and Studio Ghibli's My Neighbour Totoro (8 March 2025 – )

== Nearby tube stations ==
- Covent Garden (Piccadilly line)
- Holborn (Central, Piccadilly lines)
- Tottenham Court Road (Central, Northern, Elizabeth lines)
