= Anne Caldwell =

American dramatist

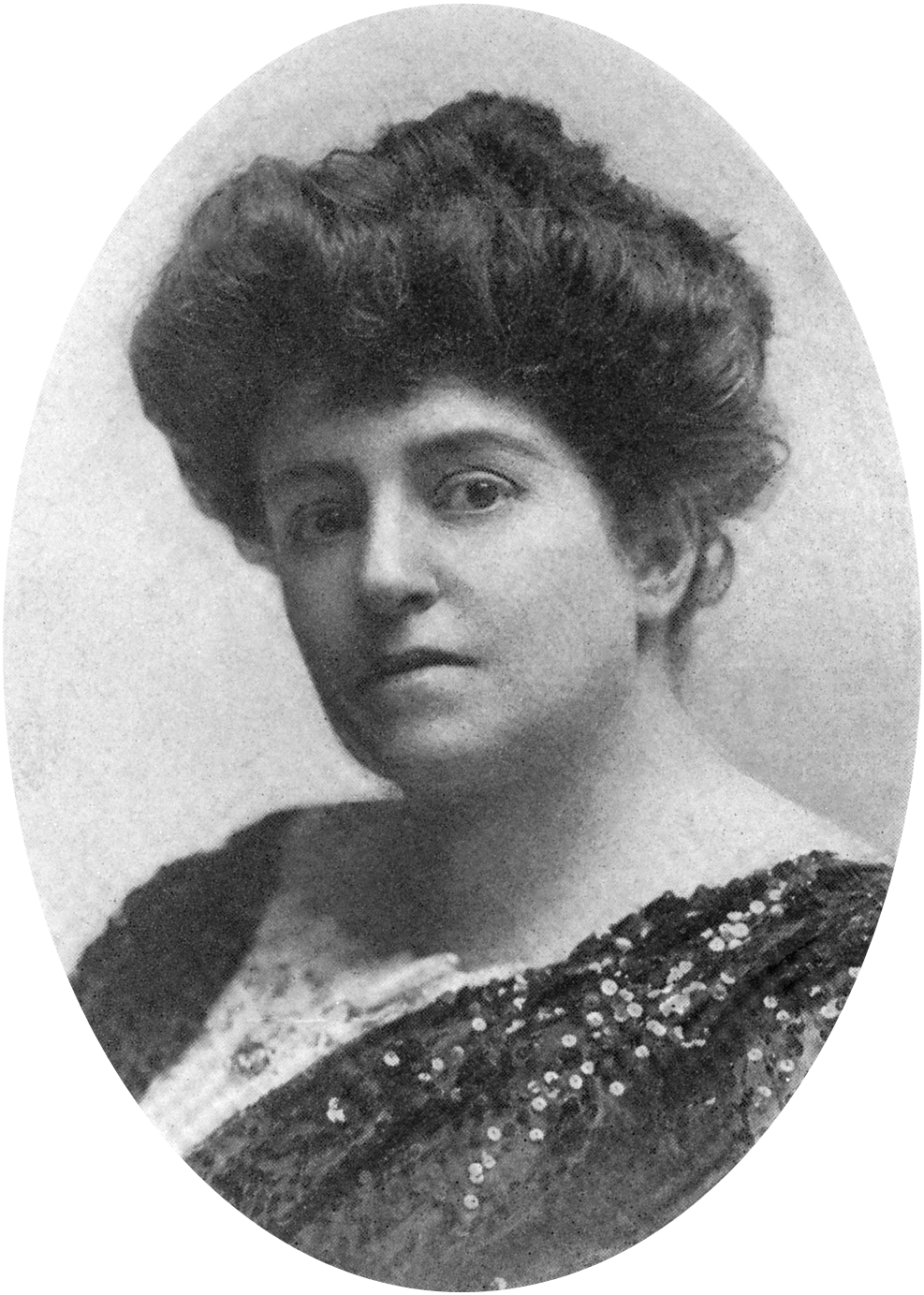
- Anne Caldwell in 1911
- Born: Anne Marsh Caldwell; August 30, 1867; Boston, Massachusetts, US
- Died: October 22, 1936 (aged 69); Beverly Hills, California, US
- Occupations: Playwright and lyricist
- Writing career
- Language: English
- Genres: Musical theater; popular music

Anne Marsh Caldwell (August 30, 1867 – October 22, 1936), also known as Anne Caldwell O'Dea and Anna Caldwell, was an American playwright and lyricist. She wrote both pop songs and Broadway shows, sometimes working with composer Jerome Kern.

== Biography ==
Anne Marsh Caldwell was born in Boston, Massachusetts. She began her career at the Juvenile Opera Co. as one of only four female songwriters active in the early 1900s. She was a charter member of the American Society of Composers, Authors and Publishers, where her output between 1907 through 1928 focused mainly on Broadway scores. In 1904 she published a book of fiction entitled Behind the scenes : short stories taken from Stage Life.

In 1929, lured by producer William LeBaron, she went to Hollywood where she became a script doctor and wrote lyrics for RKO Pictures. It was announced that she was engaged by Max Hart to write songs with Harry Tierny. By October, she was signed to write the lyrics for the film Dixiana. (Note: "Anne Caldwell Signed," Billboard, October 12, 1929, p. 22.)

From 1900 to the mid-1920s, she mostly collaborated with composer Jerome Kern. Her first collaboration with Kern was the musical, She’s a Good Fellow, followed by The Night Boat (1920), and Sally (1920). The Night Boat was one of Caldwell and Kern's more successful shows but is generally not considered revivable today. The plots and comedy of their shows don’t satisfy contemporary audiences. Her final credited work was a radio adaptation of the 1933 film (on which she had also worked) Flying Down to Rio. (Note: "Obituaries: Anne Caldwell," Variety, October 28, 1936, p. 63.)

Until the careers of Caldwell, along with Rida Johnson Young and Dorothy Donnelly, writing American musical comedy was a male profession. They helped established the idea that a female writer could create works for the stage that were equally as satirical, witty, timely, and simply as comical as the work of any man.

Caldwell married William L. Vinal on August 2, 1885, in Manhattan, New York. They had a daughter, Marianna Sarah "Molly" Vinal (1886–1950). William Vinal was killed on March 4, 1897, in a gas explosion in Boston on the Tremont Street Subway at the Boylston station. (Note: "Nine Persons Killed and Twelve Injured; Terrific Explosion In The New Boston Subway," Brooklyn Daily Eagle, March 4, 1897, pg. 1, col. 1) She remarried lyricist James J. O'Dea (Note: "Obituary: James O'Dea," Variety, April 17, 1914, pg. 14) (Note: James J. O'Dea (1870 Canada –12 Apr 1914 Rockville Centre, New York) was a vaudeville actor, lyricist, and musical comedy playwright.) on August 15, 1904, in Brooklyn.

== Death ==
She died in Beverly Hills, California, following a short illness. Her son, Anthony Patrick O'Day, and daughter, Molly O'Day (née Marianna Sarah Vinal), were with her at the time of her death.

== Legacy ==
After her death Variety said that she was "one of the most prolific librettists known to show business. A quiet, unassuming woman she developed a technique that rarely failed and was both book writer and lyricist." (Note: "Inside Stuff-Legit," Variety, October 28, 1936, p. 54.) She was inducted into the Songwriters Hall of Fame in 1970.

== Shows ==
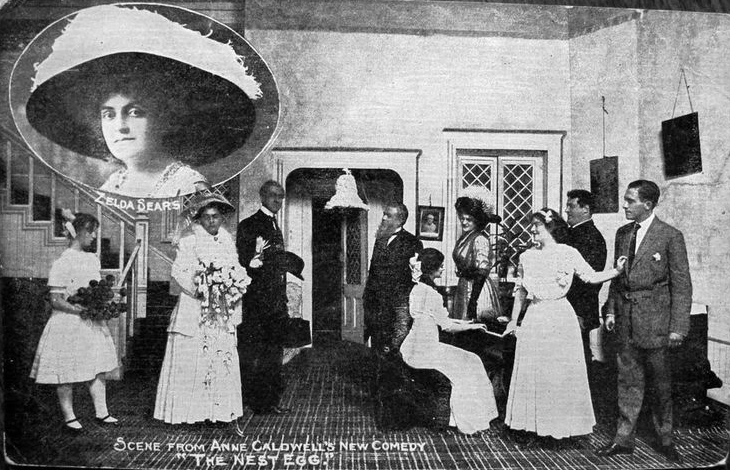
Scene from Caldwell's The Nest Egg with Zelda Sears at the Park Theatre, Boston, ca. 1911

Caldwell wrote lyrics and/or dialogue for dozens of Broadway shows:

- Sergeant Brue (1905)
- The Top o’ th’ World (1907)
- The Nest Egg (1910)
- Uncle Sam (1911)
- The Lady of the Slipper (1912)
- When Claudia Smiles (1914)
- Chin Chin (1914)
- Pom-pom (1916)
- Go to It (1916)
- Jack O’Lantern (1917)
- The Canary (1918)
- She’s a Good Fellow (1919)
- The Lady in Red (1919)
- The Night Boat (1920)
- The Sweetheart Shop (1920)
- Tip Top (1920)
- Hitchy-Koo (1920)
- Good Morning Dearie (1921)
- The Bunch and Judy (1922)
- Sally (1923)
- Stepping Stones (1923)
- Peg-O’-My-Dreams (1924)
- The Magnolia Lady (1924)
- The City Chap (1925)
- Criss Cross (1926)
- Oh, Please! (1926)
- Yours Truly (1927)
- Lucky (1927)
- Take the Air (1927)
- Yours Truly (1928)
- Three Cheers (1928)

== Films ==
- Dixiana (1930) Original Story
- Half Shot at Sunrise (1930) Screenwriter, Lyricist
- Hit the Deck (1930 and 1950) Lyricist
- Flying Down to Rio (1933) Playwright
- Tea for Two (1950) Lyricist
