= Kissing Time =

Musical

Leslie Henson (Bibi) and Phyllis Dare (Lucienne)

Kissing Time, and an earlier version titled The Girl Behind the Gun, are musical comedies with music by Ivan Caryll, book and lyrics by Guy Bolton and P. G. Wodehouse, and additional lyrics by Clifford Grey. The story is based on the 1910 play, Madame et son Filleul ("Madame and her Godson") by Maurice Hennequin, Pierre Véber and Henry de Gorsse. The story is set in contemporary France, with a glamorous actress at the centre of a farcical plot of imposture, intrigue and mistaken identity.

The piece ran for 160 performances on Broadway in 1918 with its former name, and, after substantial revision, for 430 performances in London in 1919–20 as Kissing Time, to catch the post-war mood. This was followed by a touring production. The New York cast included Donald Brian. The star-studded London cast included Stanley Holloway, Yvonne Arnaud, Leslie Henson, George Grossmith, Jr. and Phyllis Dare.

== History ==
The plot of the musical was adapted by Bolton and Wodehouse from the 1910 play, Madame et son Filleul ("Madame and her Godson") by Maurice Hennequin, Pierre Véber and Henry de Gorsse. The Girl Behind the Gun opened at the New Amsterdam Theatre in New York 16 September 1918, starring Donald Brian, and running until 1 February 1919.

It then was rewritten and opened as Kissing Time at the Winter Garden Theatre, London, on 20 May 1919, running until 3 July 1920. The Observer calculated that a million people saw the show during the 13 months of its run. A touring company took the production to the British provinces, led by George Gregory and Maidie Adams. The J.C. Williamson company toured the piece in Australia in 1920 with a company headed by Gladys Moncrieff.

In October 1920, a musical called Kissing Time, with mostly the same music by Caryll, played in New York beginning at the Lyric Theatre, but the book was by George V. Hobart, and the lyrics were by Hobart, Philander Johnson, Clifford Grey and Irving Caesar. It starred Edith Taliaferro.

== Roles and London cast ==
- Captain Wentworth – Stanley Holloway
- Georgette St. Pol – Yvonne Arnaud
- Lady Mercia Merivale – Isabel Jeans
- Zelie – Avice Kelham
- Bibi St. Pol – Leslie Henson
- Brichoux – George Barrett
- Max Touquet – George Grossmith, Jr.
- Lucienne Touquet – Phyllis Dare
- Colonel Bolinger – Tom Walls

== Synopsis ==
Grossmith and Arnaud

Four people are separately travelling to visit the glamorous actress Georgette St. Pol at her country house at Fontainebleau. First, her godson, Brichoux, whom she has not seen for many years; he is now the cook to a regiment of the French army. Second, her friend Lucienne Touquet. Third, Georgette's former guardian, Colonel Bolinger. Fourth, Lucienne's husband, Max Touquet, temporarily absenting himself from his military service; he is unaware that his wife is to visit Georgette, whom he hopes to interest in a play that he has written.

Max and Brichoux meet as they approach the house. To gain access, Max persuades his comrade to exchange army papers, and Georgette allows him in, believing him to be her godson. Partly in revenge for her husband's roving eye and partly because she finds Max attractive, she does not discourage his evident interest in her.

The sudden arrival of Max's wife sets off a series of impersonations and swapped identities. Max, to avoid discovery by Lucienne, shaves off his moustache and beard and continues to maintain that he is Brichoux. Lucienne is not deceived, and she retaliates by a vigorous flirtation with Colonel Bolinger. To prevent the embarrassment of Georgette's exposure, her husband, Bibi, finds himself having to pose as a servant in his own house, while the Colonel assumes Max is Georgette's husband. Max, meanwhile, has to keep silent while his real wife receives the attentions of the Colonel. The real Brichoux intermittently appears and has to be explained away.

Max, still unaware of Bibi's real identity, finds himself attending an evening event in his company. Bibi's indignation at his position breaks out continually. Eventually, Max confesses to Georgette that he is not her godson, and the chain of imposture unravels. The Colonel, finding that he has been flirting with Max's wife, hastily overlooks Max's deception and breach of military rules, and all ends happily.

== Musical numbers ==
The musical numbers in the London production were as follows:

Act I

- No. 1 – Chorus of Girls, with Capt. Wentworth – "Here's another godson, girls, we found him in the street; he belongs to us."
- No. 2 – Georgette and Chorus – "Godmothers who are as young and fair as you must be circumspect"
- No. 3 – Bibi and Chorus – "Ever since I owned a car, with the girls I'm popular"
- No. 4 – Georgette, Max and Bibi – "When far from the din of the battle, our heroes come home for a rest"
- No. 5 – Lucienne and Chorus – "Tho' weary and dreary life seems today, and tho' the man I love is far away"
- No. 6 – Max – "You wouldn't call me fickle, I've too much sense of duty, but corn before the sickle is my attitude to beauty."
- No. 7 – Georgette, Colonel, Max and Bibi – "So many, who have married unhappily, you meet, that when you see a couple so devoted, it's a treat..."
- No. 8 – Lucienne and Bibi – "Love I fear is very complex, most find once they begin it."
- No. 9 – Finale Act I – "I've just come back from Paris to spend a week at home"

Act II

- No. 10 – Chorus – "Wouldn't you like us all to help you?"
- No. 11 – Georgette, Colonel and Max – "Oh, how wonderful 'twould be, you must agree"
- No. 12 – Bibi – "Gosh! women are the hardest propositions!"
- No. 13 – Lucienne and Max – "Joan and Peter met one night and thought they'd take the floor."
- No. 14 – Company – "Some day never forget I may marry you yet"
- No. 15 – Lucienne – "Won't you tell me 'love' in your realm above"
- No. 16 – Dance – "The Hudson Belle"
- No. 17 – Georgette and Chorus – "When I play in Paris the fellows I know, all are crazy, don't know why"

Brichoux and Bibi

- No. 18 – Lucienne and Max – "Since first, my dear, I met you"
- No. 19 – Finale Act II – "There's a light in your eyes, on your lips there's a smile"

A new song composed by William Merrigan Daly, called "The Nicest Sort of Feeling", was added in the 1920 New York production.

== Critical reception ==
For the London opening at the new Winter Garden Theatre, reviewers devoted up to half their allotted column-space to remarks about the interior of the new building. Moreover, the two male leads, Grossmith and Henson, had both been away from the West End on wartime service in the navy and army respectively, and reviewers devoted further space to welcoming them back. As to the show itself, The Manchester Guardian commented, "Kissing Time has a story, so that the old reproach of musical comedy cannot be made here. … Mr. Caryll's music was reminiscent of Mr. Caryll. And very nice too." The Observer wrote of "a constant state of merriment", and praised all the principal performers, remarking on Henson's "inexhaustible humour", and describing Grossmith as "cheery, good natured, as in the old days", Phyllis Dare as "wholly delightful", and the other female leads as "charming".
