= Helen Eby-Rock =

American actress (1896–1979)

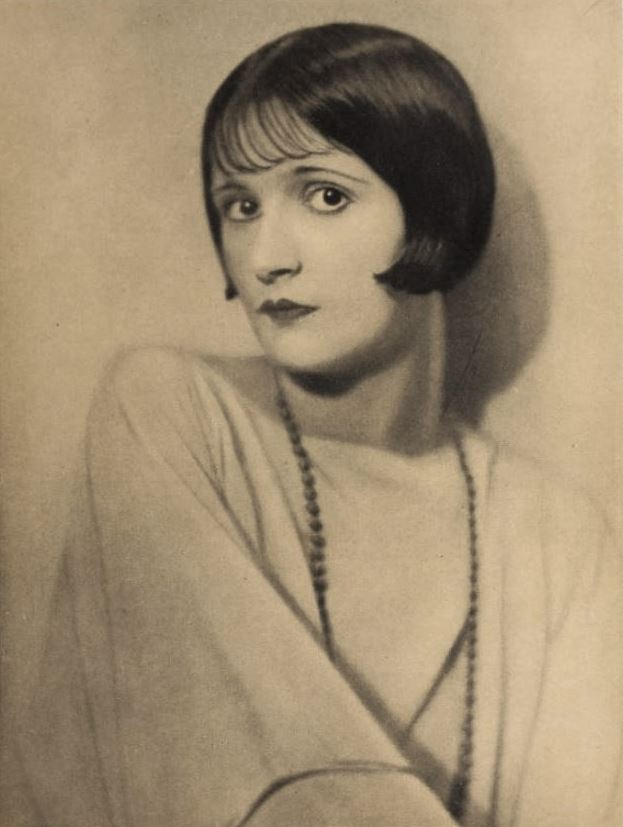
- Born: July 18, 1896; Pennsylvania
- Died: July 20, 1979; Woodland Hills
- Spouse: William Rock

Helen Eby-Rock (July 18, 1896 – July 20, 1979) was an American actress and stage performer.

Helen Eby was born on July 18, 1896 in Pennsylvania. She initially worked as a public school teacher in Altoona, Pennsylvania.

She performed in the musical revue Hitchy-Koo.with the vaudeville team of William Rock and Frances White. Rock and White split in 1919, and Eby and Rock teamed up and married. After Rock's death, Eby-Rock briefly teamed up with Jack Haley in 1925 as his straight woman. She appeared on stage in Dancing Mothers (1924), Delmar's Revels (1927), and That's the Woman (1930).

She became a character actor, starring in small roles in numerous feature films, starting with her role as dope addict Kitty Cognac in Ann Vickers (1933). She also appeared in small roles in television comedies, like The Colgate Comedy Hour, The Charlie Farrell Show, and The Jack Benny Program.

Helen Eby-Rock died on 20 July 1979 in Woodland Hills, California.

== Filmography ==
- The Salesman (1929)
- Opening Night (1931)
- The Spirits of 76th Street (1931)
- Ann Vickers (1933)
- The Crime of Helen Stanley (1934)
- The Life of Vergie Winters (1934)
- The Thin Man Goes Home (1944)
- My Reputation (1946)
- Undercurrent (1946)
- High Wall (1947)
- Force of Evil (1948)
- The Barkleys of Broadway (1949)
- Side Street (1949)
- Born Yesterday (1950)
- Caged (1950)
- A Life of Her Own (1950)
- Callaway Went Thataway (1951)
- The Man with a Cloak (1951)
- Pat and Mike (1952)
- Singin' in the Rain (1952)
- A Star is Born (1954)
- Over-Exposed (1956)
