= The Candy Shop =

1909 musical comedy

- Music: John Golden
- Lyrics: John Golden
- Book: George V. Hobart
- Productions: Knickerbocker Theatre, New York 1909

The Candy Shop is a two-act musical comedy, with music and lyrics by John Golden and libretto by George V. Hobart, first performed April 27, 1909 at the Knickerbocker Theatre in New York.

The production ran for 49 performances, closing on June 12, 1909. Produced by Charles Dillingham, the production was directed by William E. MacQuinn and staged by Fred G. Latham; scenic design by Homer Emens and John H. Young, with costumes designed by Elsie DeWolfe. The cast featured Ida Adams, Maude Fulton and William Rock (a vaudeville duo then known as Rock & Fulton) and received mixed to positive reviews, with one paper describing the show as "a stage reproduction of a Coney Island scene a thing of vivid color, life, and comics."

After closing, a condensed version of the show was performed at Bay State Hospital in Boston for a wealthy patient. The musical is associated with the songs "Oh You Candy Kid" and "Googy-oo", however neither song appears in the vocal score or other performance references. The musical also features a song that employs negative stereotypes of Chinese people, part of an offensive yet persistent "enthusiasm for Chinese-themed entertainments, especially during the first two decades of the twentieth century".

The story features the adventures of Jack Sweet, son of a candy shop owner, after his father accuses him of theft.

Still images from the production are available via the New York Public Library.

== List of musical numbers ==
Act 1 (The Candy Shop)

- Opening Chorus (Working, clerking, selling candies, etc.)
- "Now That I've Got It, I Don't Want It " (Solo and Chorus) - John, Girls
- "Just We Two" (Duet) - Jack, Hilda
- "Honey Bunch" (Solo and Ensemble) - Jack, Sue, Settle
- "I've Been Married Once" (Solo) - Saul
- "In Vaudeville" (Duet and Ensemble) - Gilbert, Hilda
- "You're My Girl" (Duet) - Gilbert, Hilda
- Finale (Who Among You Stole That Jewel?) - Entire Company

Act 2 (Coney Island)

- Opening Chorus (There Is an Island) - Entire Company
- "By Wireless" (Double Octette) - Boys, Girls
- "Help! And the Villain Goes to Jail" (Solo and Chorus) - Sally Ann
- "Chinese Love Song" (Duet) - Gilbert, Hilda
- "Mr. Othello" (Solo) - Mrs Gregory
- "Meet Me Down on the Corner" - Gilbert, Sally Ann
