= Ida Adams =

American musical theatre actress (1888-1960)

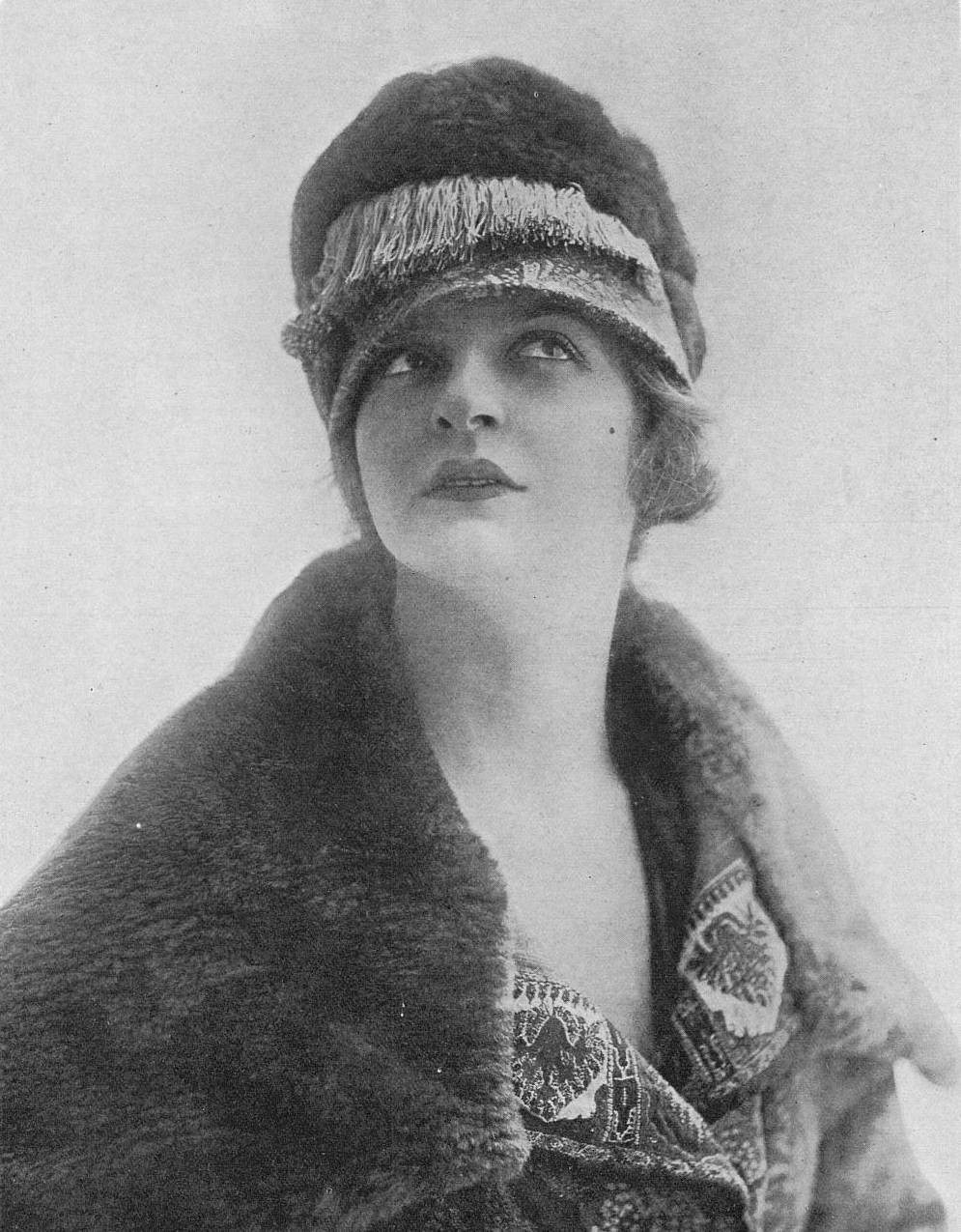
- Adams in 1917
- Born: Ida M. Adams c. 1888; United States
- Died: November 4, 1960 (aged 71–72)
- Occupations: Stage actress, singer

Ida Adams (c. 1888 – November 4, 1960), sometimes credited as Ida M. Adams, was an American-born actress and singer who worked chiefly in musical theatre. Her career from 1909 to 1914 was in the United States, then in London's West End from 1915 to 1917.

== Early life ==
Adams was born c. 1888 in the United States.

== Career ==
Adams's third appearance on stage was at the Knickerbocker Theatre on Broadway on April 27, 1909, playing Miss Glick in The Candy Shop. Later that year, she toured in Three Twins, as Summer Girl and Boo Hoo Tee Hee Girl. In 1911, she was Desirée in the musical The Pink Lady at the New Amsterdam Theatre, after which she went on tour with the show. She was next in Florenz Ziegfeld's A Winsome Widow (1912), at the Moulin Rouge, in New York, playing the role of Tony. From October 1912 she appeared in the Ziegfeld Follies of 1912, which ran until January 1913.

Harry Conor as Welland Strong and Ida Adams as Tony in A Winsome Widow (1917).

After Ziegfeld Follies, Adams moved to London, playing at the London Hippodrome in 1915, appearing the next year in the revue Half-Past Eight at the Comedy Theatre, and then in Charles B. Cochran's Houp La! (1916) at St Martin's Theatre. She recorded two songs from Houp La! for His Master's Voice at the Gramophone Company's studios at Hayes, Middlesex, on 11 January 1917. The first of these was "Oh! How She Could Yacki Hacki Wicki Wacki Woo," accompanied by a female choir and the St Martin's Theatre Orchestra, while the second was Paul Rubens's "Wonderful Girl, Wonderful Boy, Wonderful Time", sung as a trio with Gertie Millar and Nat Ayer. Cochran later recalled that Binnie Hale had "got her first chance" in Houp-La! as Adams's understudy, but that she had a "harassing debut" because Adams, having insisted on paying for her own clothes, had also stipulated that no understudy should wear them. In 1977, a member of the Houp La! cast from 1916 recalled in The Listener:

There was a wonderful American woman named Ida Adams in the cast. She was spectacular! They used to keep some staff on at the bank every night, so that she could put all her jewellery back after the show. Oh, she was glorious!

Adams's last known theatrical appearance was as Jane Gerson in the play Inside the Lines (1917), which had a long run at the Apollo Theatre, London. The Sketch said of Inside the Lines "The charm and beauty of Miss Ida Adams are very attractive features of a remarkable and topically interesting production, in which also appear Miss Grace Lane, Mr. Eille Norwood, Mr. Frederick Ross, Mr. E. Dagnall, and other well-players."

== Later life and legacy ==
Adams died on November 4, 1960, aged 72. Some sources conflate Ida M. Adams and Ida M. Evans, an American short story writer active in the same era.

A costume drawing, “Miss Ida Adams”, in the Museum of the City of New York, is attributed to Lucy, Lady Duff-Gordon, who worked on Ziegfeld Follies.
