= Ann Vickers (film) =

1933 film

- Directed by: John Cromwell
- Written by: Jane Murfin
- Based on: Ann Vickers by Sinclair Lewis
- Produced by: Pandro S. Berman
- Starring: Irene Dunne; Walter Huston
- Cinematography: Edward Cronjager
- Edited by: George Nicholls, Jr.
- Music by: Roy Webb
- Production company: RKO Radio Pictures
- Distributed by: RKO Radio Pictures
- Release date: September 26, 1933
- Running time: 76 minutes
- Country: United States
- Language: English

Ann Vickers is a 1933 American pre-Code romantic drama directed by John Cromwell and starring Irene Dunne and Walter Huston. It is based on the novel of the same name by Sinclair Lewis.

== Plot ==
After a military officer gets Ann Vickers pregnant and leaves her, she and friend Malvina Wormser go to Havana, where she gets an abortion. Feeling conflicted and regretful, Ann devotes herself to social work, taking a job in a women's prison. However, when she tries to improve the conditions there, she loses her job. She instead writes a book about the harsh realities of the prison and begins a romance with a married judge, Barney Dolphin. Though progressive in his views, Dolphin is caught taking bribes and is sentenced to prison. Ann, once again pregnant, supports herself by writing until Dolphin is released a few years later. Finally, Ann, Dolphin, and their child are reunited.

== Cast ==
- Irene Dunne as Ann Vickers
- Walter Huston as Barney Dolphin
- Conrad Nagel as Lindsey Atwell
- Bruce Cabot as Captain Resnick
- Edna May Oliver as Malvina Wormser
- Sam Hardy as Russell Spaulding
- Mitchell Lewis as Captain Waldo
- Murray Kinnell as Dr. Slenk
- Helen Eby-Rock as Kitty Cognac
- Gertrude Michael as Mona Dolphin
- J. Carroll Naish as Dr. Sorelle
- Sarah Padden as Lil
- Reginald Barlow as Chaplain
- Rafaella Ottiano as Mrs. Feldermans
- Wally Albright as Mischa Feldermans (uncredited)
- John Cromwell as Sad-Faced Doughboy (uncredited)

== Controversy ==
In the novel, Ann Vickers is a birth control advocate and reformer who has two extramarital affairs, each time becoming pregnant though unwed. The original screenplay, following Sinclair Lewis's novel, had her obtaining an abortion, but the story was changed so that she gives birth to a child who dies. The screenplay for the 1933 film was approved by the Production Code only when RKO Radio Pictures also agreed to make Vickers an unmarried woman at the time of her affairs, thus eliminating the issue of adultery.

The reaction of leading American Roman Catholics to the content in this film and The Sign of the Cross led to the formation in 1934 of the Catholic Legion of Decency, an organization dedicated to identifying and combating what it viewed as objectionable content in films, usually by threatening a boycott.
