= Gay New York (musical) =

1905 musical

Gay New York is a musical in two acts with both book and lyrics by Maurice Hegeman and music by Harry Trappert. The musical was adapted from an unidentified German-language operetta.

== Plot ==
Set on Fifth Avenue in Manhattan and on Long Island, Gay New York is a musical farce in which the New York tailor Herman Schultz splurges on a night out on the town to the chagrin of his wife Bertha. A comedy of errors, all sorts of misadventures occur; including a series of mistaken identities involving three men with nearly identical names: Walter Brook Jennings, the owner of a Swedish massage parlor; Supreme Court Justice W. B. Jennings; and Wilbur Jennings, the son of the judge. Schultz is accompanied on his adventures by the recent Vassar College graduate Dr. Marie Darcey; the messenger boy Swifty; the famous woman golfer Donna Dean; and the celebrated dancer Mlle. Florizell. When trouble arises, the policeman Officer Ketchim becomes involved.

== Performance history ==
Gay New York was a successful "road musical" created as a starring vehicle for Dan Mason. The production was initially organized by the theatrical impresario Gus Hill and began touring the MidWest and Eastern portions of the United States in the autumn of 1905. However, by the time the touring production reached Broadway's Murray Hill Theatre in February 1906 there was no mention of Hill's involvement and Charles E. Barton was listed the show's producer and M. L. Heckert as director.

Gay New York played only eight performances at the Murray Hill Theatre from February 5, 1906, through February 10, 1906, and then continued on its national tour elsewhere. The Broadway cast included Dan Mason as Herman Schultz; Louise Sanford as Bertha Schultz; Kathryn Bartlett as Marie Darcey, M.D.; Dan W. Mack as "Swifty"; Lillian Hoerlein as Mlle. Florizell; Ed Brennan as Walter Brook Jennings; Theodore S. Peters as the Honorable W. B. Jennings; Edward B. Adams as Wilbur Jennings; Violet Rio as Donna Dean; William Butler as Officer Ketchim; Leah Keinz as Julia Schultz; Lulu Lee as Dolly Van Tassel; Charles E. Foreman as Frank Swift; Nellie Cameron as Marjorie Darje; Joseph F. Willard as Sam; and Bessie Bartell as Polly Primrose. The show's sets were designed by Ernest Albert and C. W. Valentine, and the costumes were designed by Will R. Barnes, Frank Hayden and J. Henry Rowley.

== Bibliography ==
- Bloom, Ken (1996). "Gay New York". American Song: A-S. Schirmer Books. ISBN 9780028645735.
- Dietz, Dan (2022). "Gay New York". The Complete Book of 1900s Broadway Musicals. Rowman & Littlefield Publishers. ISBN 9781538168943.
- Joseph P. Eckhardt (2020). Dan Mason: From Vaudeville to Broadway to the Silent Screen. McFarland & Company. ISBN 9781476641812.
