= Ida M. Evans =

American writer (~1886 – post-1944)

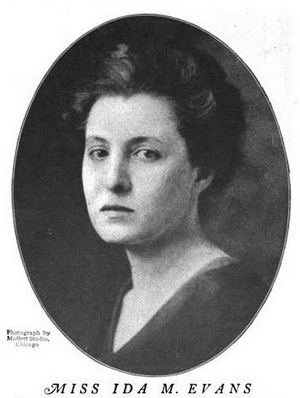
- from a 1919 publication
- Born: Red Oak, Iowa
- Occupation: Writer

Ida M. Evans (born about 1886 – died after 1944) was an American short story writer most successful in the 1910s and 1920s. Several of her stories were adapted for the screen in the 1910s.

== Early life ==
Ida May Evans was born in Red Oak, Iowa. In the 1890s she attended and taught at her grandfather's school short-lived school, Hamilton White College in Lebanon, Missouri.

== Career ==
Evans worked in "wholesale millinery houses" in Chicago and Omaha when she began writing. Her first stories began appearing in print in 1911. "I was mighty careful to keep working at the wholesale houses for my bread and butter, until my stories began to sell fast enough to provide plenty of butter" she explained in 1918. She wrote short stories for national publications including American Magazine, Everybody's, McClure's, Good Housekeeping, Red Book, Hearst's International, Cosmopolitan, The Saturday Evening Post, and The Green Book Magazine. Her story "On the Banks of Wabash Avenue" (1918, Good Housekeeping) was illustrated by James Montgomery Flagg.

Several of Evans's stories were adapted for the screen as silent films: A Question of Hats and Gowns (1914, from "Town Pumps and Gold Leaf"), Virginia (1916, short), It Makes a Difference (1917, short), Limousine Life (1918), The Way of a Man with a Maid (1918), and The Path She Chose (1920, based on the same story as Virginia). Other stories were bought for screen adaptation, and "Marry in Haste", was adapted in 1935 by Lockie Ingle.

Some sources conflate Ida M. Evans and Ida M. Adams, an actress and singer flourishing in the same period. There is no mention of a stage or music career in biographical notes about or by this author.

== Selected stories by Ida M. Evans ==
- "A Pink Feather" (1913, Red Book)
- "The Girl Who Came Back" (1913, Red Book)
- "Out of the Frying Pan" (1914, Red Book)
- "The Home that Eva Furnished" (1914, Red Book)
- "Being Kind to Anne" (1916, Green Book)
- "Marthy" (1916, Red Book)
- "Brew of Ashes" (1917, McClure's)
- "On the Banks of Wabash Avenue" (1918, Good Housekeeping)
- "The Old Order Changeth" (1918, Red Book)
- "The Lonesome Club" (1918, Red Book)
- "Omelets for Violets" (1918, American Magazine)
- "Ethel Lavvander's Husband" (1918, Everybody's)
- "Violet Eyes" (1919, Cosmopolitan)
- "The Heavy Mantle of Helen" (1919, Good Housekeeping)
- "Golden Apples" (1920, Green Book)
- "The Eternal Biangle" (1920, Good Housekeeping)
- "Yellows" (1921, Good Housekeeping)
- "Her Place in the Sun" (1921, Cosmopolitan)
- "Monday for the World" (1922, Cosmopolitan)
- "The Jazz Jessalyns" (1923, Red Book, also serialized in 1924, Washington Star)
- "Natalie Comes Through" (1923, Red Book)
- "On the Hip" (1924, Red Book)
- "The Fifth Estate" (1924, Hearst's International)
- "And They Called Him a Fool" (1926, Hearst's International)
- "The Bitter Samaritan" (1927, Hardin Tribune-Herald)
- "Pavilion Queen" (1927, The Country Gentleman)
- "The Night Club Hostess" (1929, Red Book)
- "Dollar Babies" (1930, Hearst's International)
- "Pearls for Marguery Nolan" (1931, St. Louis Globe Democrat)
- "Chinnon Descendant and the Law" (1934, The News and Observer)
- "Dolls and Drums" (1935, The News and Observer)
- "Bird of Passage" (1942, Pittsburgh-Sun-Telegraph)
- "The Christmas Star is White" (1942, The News and Observer)
- "House of Gloom" (1944, Pittsburgh Sun-Telegraph)
- "House Party" (1949, Mirror News)

== Personal life ==
Evans lived in Chicago and Los Angeles.
