= Limousine Life =

1918 film

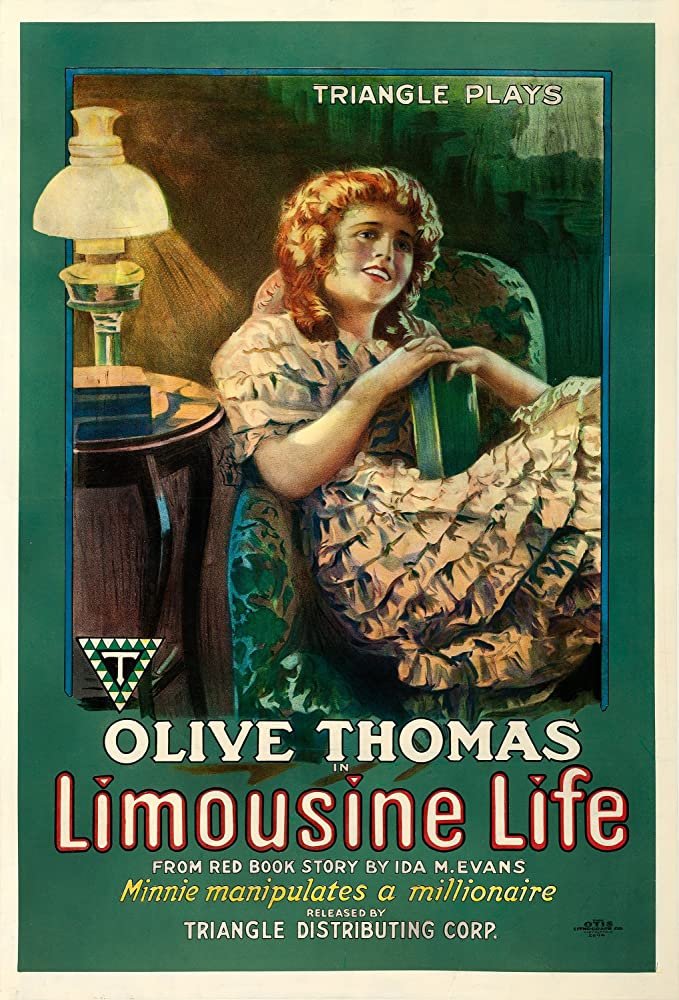
- Directed by: John Francis Dillon
- Written by: Jack Cunningham; Ida M. Evans (story)
- Produced by: Triangle Film Corporation
- Starring: Olive Thomas
- Cinematography: Anton Nagy
- Distributed by: Triangle Distributing
- Release date: February 3, 1918
- Running time: 5 reels
- Country: USA
- Language: Silent...English intertitles

Limousine Life is a lost 1918 silent film comedy directed by John F. Dillon and starring Olive Thomas. It was produced and distributed by Triangle Film Corporation.

== Cast ==
- Olive Thomas - Minnie Wills
- Lee Phelps - Moncure Kelts
- Joseph Bennett - Jed Bronson
- Lillian West - Gertrude Muldane
- Virginia Foltz - Miss Wilkins
- Alberta Lee - Mrs. Wills
- Lottie De Vaull - Mrs. Malvin
- Lillian Langdon - Mrs. Kelts
- Harry L. Rattenberry - Mr. Wills
- Jules Friquet - Jasper Bronson
