= Nathaniel Newnham-Davis (journalist) =

British food writer and gourmet (1854–1917)

Newnham-Davis in 1914

Nathaniel Newnham-Davis (6 November 1854 – 28 May 1917), generally known as Lieutenant Colonel Newnham-Davis, was a British food writer and gourmet. After a military career, he took up journalism, and was chiefly known for his restaurant reports from London establishments of the last decade of the 19th century and the first decade of the 20th. He was also active in the theatre as an occasional playwright and amateur performer.

== Life and career ==
=== Early years, army and journalism ===
Newnham-Davis was born in London on 6 November 1854, the eldest son of Henry Newnham-Davis and his wife, Mary. He was educated at Harrow School, and joined the Buffs, a leading infantry regiment of the British army. He served in the South African colonial campaigns with the Imperial Mounted Infantry, and was decorated and twice mentioned in dispatches. He later served in the Straits Settlements, China and India. For three years he was attached to the Intelligence Department at Simla.

In 1894, Newnham-Davis retired from the army with the rank of lieutenant colonel, and joined the staff of The Sporting Times, remaining with the publication until 1912. From 1894 to 1900 he was also editor of The Man of the World. He wrote fiction, Three Men and a God, and other stories (1896), Jadoo (1898) and "Baby" Wilkinson's V.C., and other stories (1899).

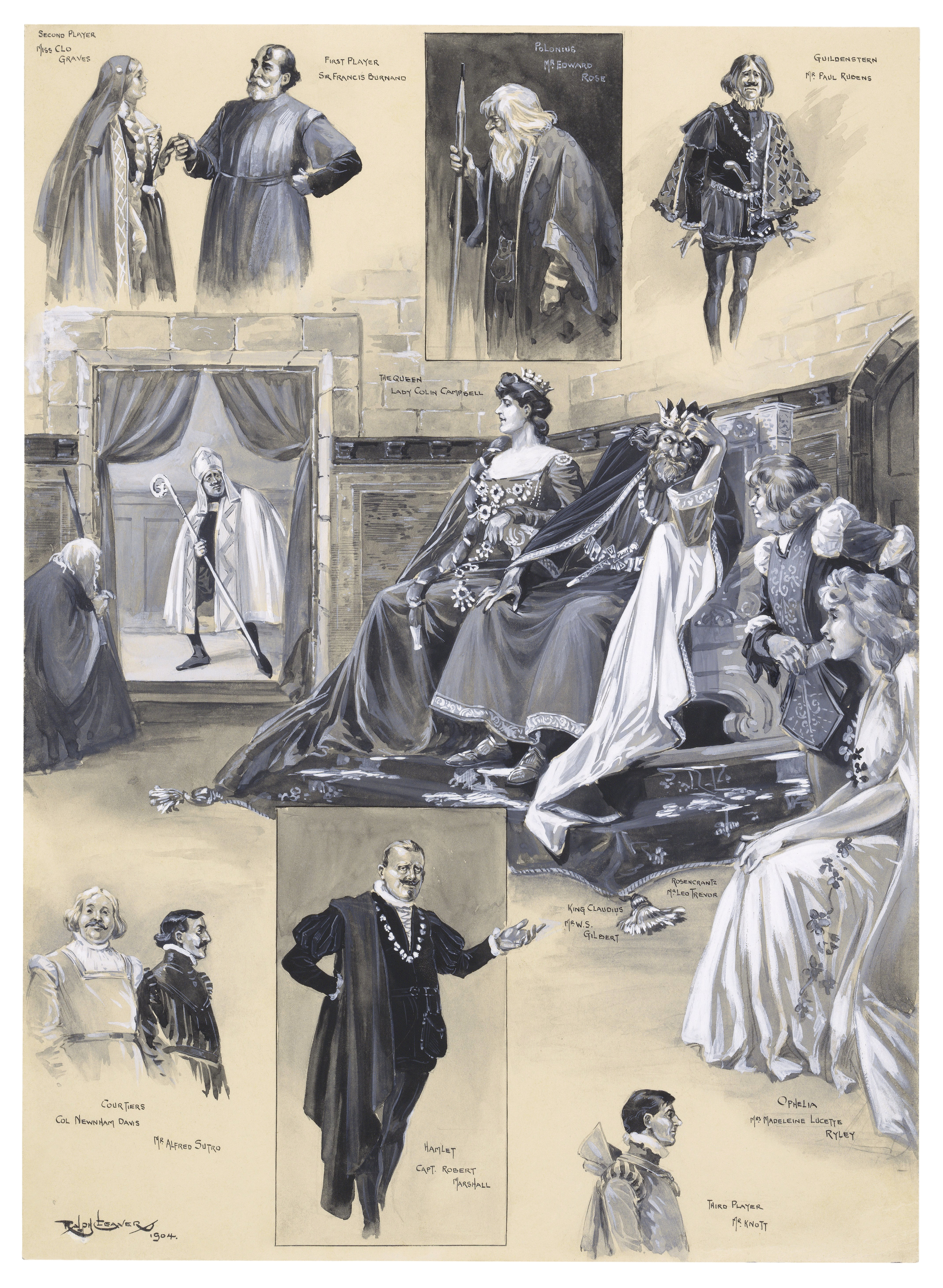
Illustration of a 1904 benefit performance of W. S. Gilbert's Rosencrantz and Guildenstern with Newnham-Davis as one of the courtiers (pictured lower left)

The Times described Newnham-Davis as a playwright in addition to his military and journalistic career. While still in the army he made a version of A Midsummer Night's Dream "adapted to pastoral representation", published in Calcutta. He published a play, A Charitable Bequest – A comedietta (1900). He wrote the story for several ballets, and was co-author of a show, Lady Madcap, in collaboration with Paul Rubens and Percy Greenbank, produced in London in 1904. In the same year he joined W. S. Gilbert, F. C. Burnand, Bernard Shaw and others in a charity matinée performance of Gilbert's Rosencrantz and Guildenstern at the Garrick Theatre.

=== Food writer ===
Newnham-Davis was best known for his writings about food and wine. His Dinners and Diners – Where and How to Dine in London was published in 1899, with a second edition in 1901. In 1903 he published The Gourmet's Guide to Europe, written in collaboration with Algernon Bastard. (Note: John Algernon Bastard (October 1844 – 20 November 1908) collaborated only on the first edition; the second and third were Newnham-Davis's sole work. Bastard came to public notice when he sued his wife for divorce in 1895, in a case headlined in The Times as "Bastard v. Bastard and Brunton".) A second edition was published in 1908 and a third in 1911. The New York Times wrote of him: "He is not of a domestic turn. The people of the gay world he affects breakfast at a café, lunch at a club, dine in the palm room, or the ivory room, or the gold room of a 'swell' hotel." The Gourmet's Guide to Europe was published in an American edition in 1908, when The New York Times called it "a veritable masterwork of its own genre". In 1914 Newnham-Davis published The Gourmet's Guide to London.

Newnham-Davis is chiefly remembered as the gastronomic correspondent of The Pall Mall Gazette. A lifelong bachelor, he regularly dined at London's great hotels and restaurants in company with a succession of companions given discreet pseudonyms in his restaurant reviews. Among them were "the Colleen", who "prattled incessantly of horses", "the Little Prima Donna", "the Dean's Daughter," and "Miss Brighteyes", a débutante who distressed her host by drinking lemonade with caviare.

In a 1952 article about Newnham-Davis, entitled "A Gourmet in Edwardian London", Elizabeth David detailed some of the menus presented to the Colonel and his companions in the last years of the Victorian era and the first decade of the 20th century. A fairly typical example was "oysters, soup, sole, a fillet of beef cooked with truffles and accompanied by pommes de terre soufflés, wild duck à la presse, a pudding and an ice-cream (bombe Midland)". David notes that with a bottle of wine, this dinner cost 28 shillings for the two of them. Newnham-Davis was strictly fair in his reports, and seldom expressed a preference for one establishment over others. He rarely condemned a restaurant, instead conveying his disapproval by omission. He said that he did not "think it fair to a restaurant to condemn it upon one trial, or fair to himself to give it another." Despite Newnham-Davis's efforts to remain impartial, Elizabeth David concluded that his personal favourite was the Savoy Hotel. There, in the 1890s, Escoffier's mousse de jambon, "served on a great block of ice and melting like snow in the mouth", was declared a masterpiece, and his bortsch was held by Newnham-Davis to be the best soup in the world.

=== Last years ===
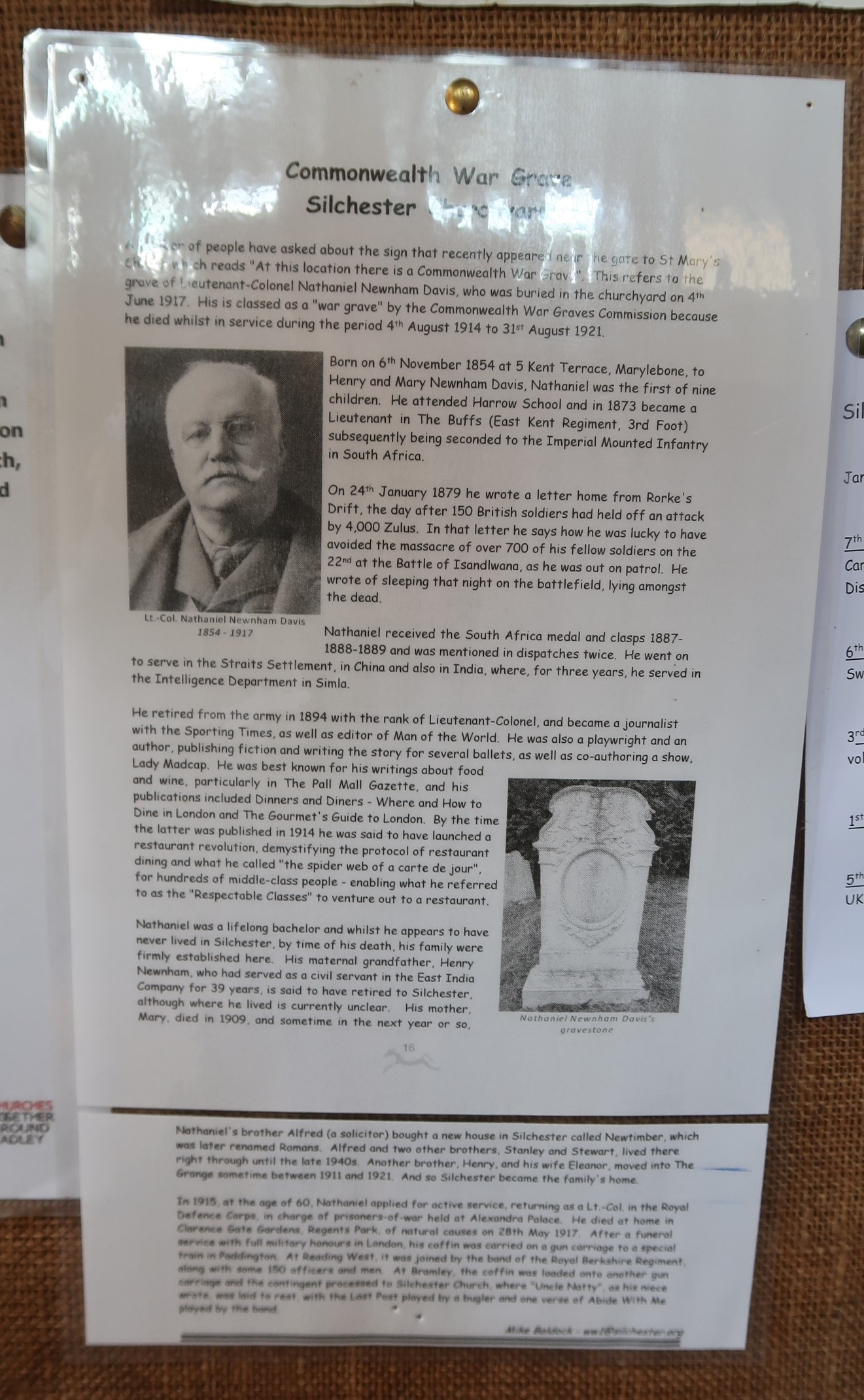
Lieutenant-Colonel Nathaniel Newnham Davis life story in St Mary the Virgin, Silchester, showing his non-standard war grave

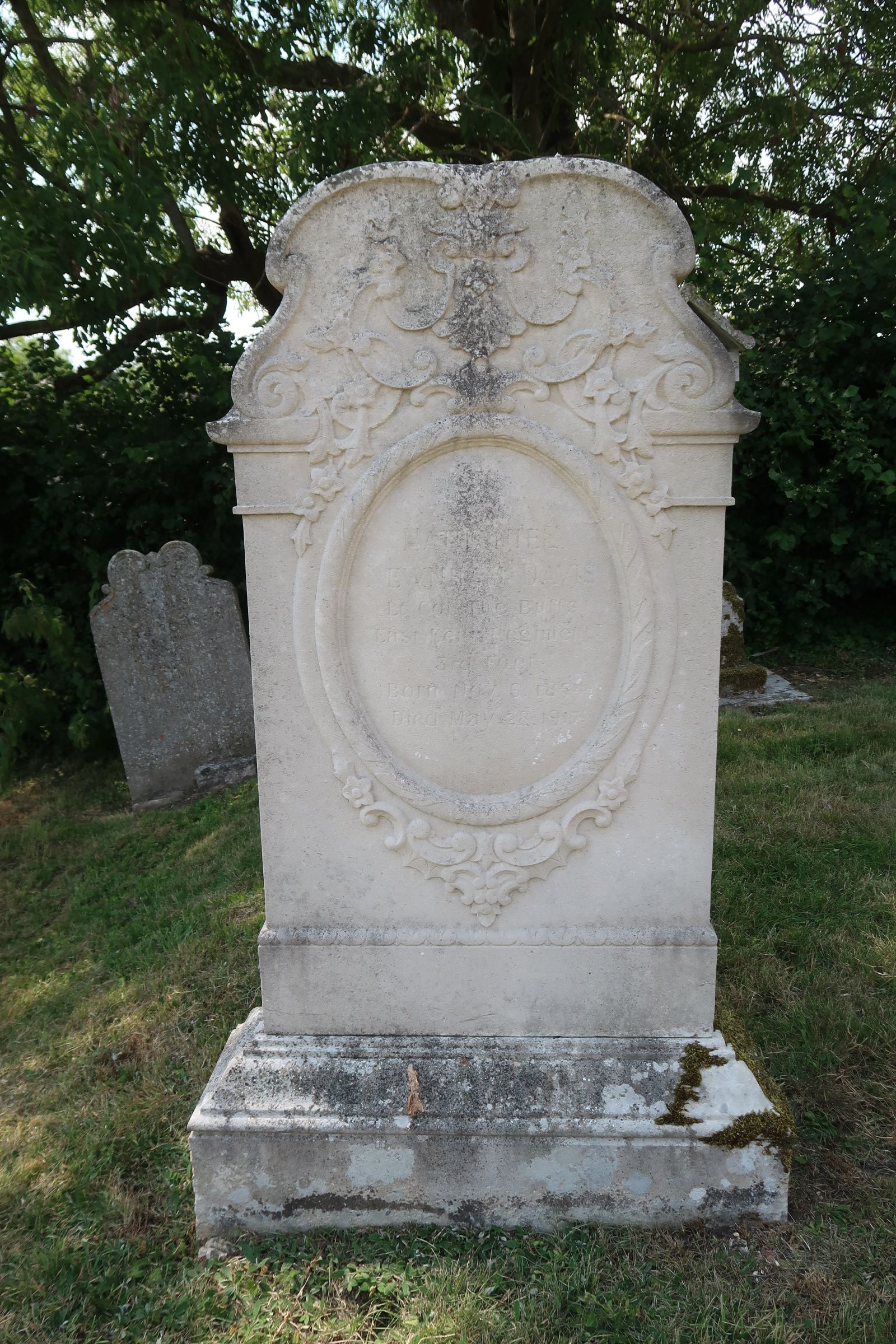
Lieutenant-Colonel Nathaniel Newnham Davis Commonwealth War Gravestone in St Mary the Virgin, Silchester, graveyard

In 1915, during the First World War, Newnham-Davis applied for re-engagement by the army and was put in charge of prisoners of war held at Alexandra Palace. He died on 28 May 1917 at his house near Regent's Park, London, aged 62. He was buried at Silchester, Hampshire, with full military honours.

== Sources ==
- David, Elizabeth (1986) [1984]. An Omelette and a Glass of Wine (second ed.). Harmondsworth: Penguin. ISBN 0-14-046721-1.
