= Houp La! =

- Gertie Millar as Tillie
- Music: Nat D. Ayer & Howard Talbot
- Lyrics: Percy Greenbank & Hugh E. Wright
- Book: Fred Thompson & Hugh E. Wright
- Productions: 1916–1917 St Martin's Theatre, West End

Houp La! is an Edwardian musical comedy extravaganza, with music by Nat D. Ayer and Howard Talbot, lyrics by Percy Greenbank and Hugh E. Wright, and a book by Fred Thompson and Hugh E. Wright. The story combines the comic financial troubles of a circus owner with a love triangle.

The original production of the show was mounted by Charles B. Cochran at London's new St Martin's Theatre, opening on 23 November 1916 and starring Gertie Millar, George Graves, Nat Ayer and Ida Adams. It was the first production at the St Martin's, which was leased by Cochran. Although the critics found the music innovative, and the cast included stars of the day, the show ran for only three months in London. A Manchester production followed.

== Plot ==
Act I

The owner of a struggling circus, Marmaduke Bunn, has severe money troubles. In desperation, he has an accumulator bet on all the horse-races of the day, and when his fancies all romp home he is thrilled by the size of his winnings. A French girl, Liane de Rose, tries to teach Bunn some of the complications of her language. Meanwhile, Tillie Runstead, the star of the circus, is in love with her admirer Peter Carey, a rich young polo player, but is worried because to her dismay her beau's interest appears to be veering towards the circus's dancer Ada Eve.

Madeleine Choiseuille and George Graves

Act II

Tillie makes good use of Ada's cloak and thus catches out her wandering lover. Sadly for Marmaduke Bunn, he finds he has made a mistake about the name of the winning horse in the day's last race, so he has won nothing, after all.

== Songs ==
Tillie sings the title song "Houp La!", as well as "Pretty Baby" and "The Fool of the Family", and with Peter she sings the duets "You Can't Love as I Do" and "I've Saved all My Loving for You". Liane de Rose has the comic song "L'Amour est Bon".

At least four songs from the show were recorded. "Oh! How She Could Yacki Hacki Wicki Wacki Woo", an interpolated "Hawaiian" number by Albert von Tilzer, was sung in the 1916–1917 London production by Ida Adams. With a female choir and the St. Martin's Theatre Orchestra conducted by James Sale, Adams recorded the song for the His Master's Voice at the Gramophone Company studios in Hayes on 11 January 1917. On the same day, she recorded with Gertie Millar and Nat D. Ayer the trio "Wonderful Girl, Wonderful Boy, Wonderful Time", a song from the show by Paul Rubens, while Millar and Ayer recorded their two duets from the show.

== Reception and aftermath ==
Ida Adams and chorus

The play was well-received, and shared an issue of The Play Pictorial with Potash & Perlmutter in Society, but it failed to achieve a long run. It had its 100th performance in February 1917 and closed a week later. Cochran later presented it in Manchester. He wrote of Houp La! in The Secrets of a Showman (1925): "I had engaged Gertie Millar, George Graves, Ida Adams, Nat D. Ayer, Hugh E. Wright, a French actress new to London, Madeline Choiseuille – and perhaps the prettiest collection of girls ever seen on any stage in the world." He also noted that Binnie Hale had "got her first chance" in Houp-La, as Ida Adams's understudy, but that she had a "harassing debut" because Adams, having insisted on paying for her own clothes, had also stipulated that no understudy should wear them.

Reviewing the premiere, the critic of The Observer wrote:

There is any amount of promise about it; but not much that looked like achievement. Miss Gertie Millar seemed to wake up to give us a delicious piece of nonsense, the very comic song and dance called "The Fool of the Family". Mr. George Graves, as funny old Bunn, seemed to be feeling his way; Mr. Hugh E. Wright was too unrelieved in melancholy, and Mr. Nat D. Ayer had to sing so many songs about girls, cuddling, kissing and so forth that he must have been as sick of the subject as we were. Next to Miss Millar's "Fool of the Family," the most successful thing was Mlle. Madeleine Choiseuille's song, "L'Amour est Bon", which went splendidly.

Of the provincial production, Neville Cardus wrote in The Manchester Guardian that the music "in its impudent rhythms, adapted from the music hall, and immensely free use of the orchestra, is characteristic of [Nat D. Ayer], who has displayed more instinct for the needs of popular music than any of our native musicians."

Almost sixty years later, in 1975, a critic noted that "Houp La ... did a lot towards elevating the chorus girl to something more than a grinning background to the stars." In 1977, a member of the 1916 cast recalled in The Listener: "There was a wonderful American woman named Ida Adams in the cast. She was spectacular! They used to keep some staff on at the bank every night, so that she could put all her jewellery back after the show."

== Original cast, November 1916 ==
The opening cast included:

- Tillie Runstead – Gertie Millar
- Peter Carey – Nat D. Ayer
- Christopher Blewitt – Joseph Tozer
- Damocles – Hugh E. Wright
- Liane de Rose – Madeleine Choiseuille
- Ada Eve – Ida Adams
- Aggie – Daisy Burrell
- Marmaduke Bunn – George Graves
- George Kunstead – Rube Welch
- Lady Irene Norbury – Margot Erskine
- The Hon. Diana Datchet – Elsie Scott
- Annette – Binnie Hale
- Betty – Ivy Tresmand
- An Ostler – Robert Vincent
- An Arab Tumbler – Lucy Marshall
- A Trapeze Artist – Olive Atkinson
- A Bareback Rider – Cissie Lorraine
- Joan – Elizabeth Beerbohm
- Peggy – Mabel Buckley
- Angela – Violet Leicester
- Gladys – Pepita Bobadilla
- Louie Owen – Clarice
- A Lion Tamer – Mamie Whittaker
- A Bear Trainer – Kathleen Gower
- A Japanese Juggler – Daisy Davis
- A Cockatoo Trainer – Molly Vere
- Clowns – Dorothy St. Ruth, Amy Verity
- The Compere and Commere – Vera Neville and Valerie May
