= The Pink Lady (musical) =

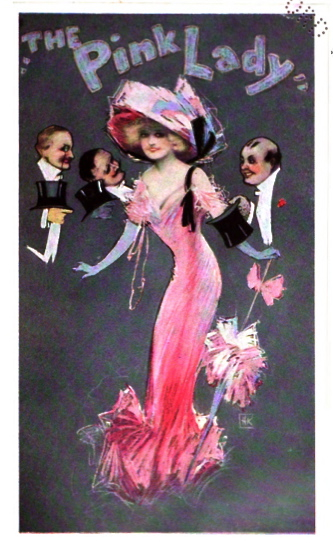
The Pink Lady, 1911 poster by Hamilton King

The Pink Lady is an Edwardian musical comedy composed by Ivan Caryll, which ran for a very successful 312 performances on Broadway in 1911 before becoming an ongoing favorite of regional producers in the Midwest. The story and lyrics by C.M.S. McLellan, about an antiques dealer, were adapted from a French farce, The Satyr, by Georges Berr and Marcel Guiltemand

The musical premiered at the New Amsterdam Theatre in New York, running for 312 performances from March 13, 1911, to December 9, 1911. In the title role of Claudine, Hazel Dawn was nineteen years old when the show opened. She played the violin during the show. Others in the cast included Maurice Hegeman as Dr. Mazou, Alice Dovey as Angele, Florence Walton as Minette, and Ida Adams as Desirée, and the production was directed by Herbert Gresham and choreographed by Julian Mitchell. The run set the record for receipts and attendance at the theatre and soon toured successfully. The show was so popular that its costume designs inspired some ladies' fashions.

After a brief London run at the Globe Theatre from April 11, 1912, the musical returned to the New Amsterdam for a further 24 performances from August 26, 1912, to September 14, 1912.

Unlike most Edwardian musicals, wrote the New York Times critic, the show's "fun is developed logically out of its situations, and so are its songs. In the second act, for instance, not a musical number occurs which does not carry the plot along further, instead of halting it, and yet no songs in the piece were more persistently applauded than these."

== Plot ==
Act I

The maidens in a European village not far from Paris are frightened, but secretly thrilled, by a mysterious man called Satyr, who kisses and embraces them if they venture into the woods to pick mushrooms. Lucien, an engaged young man arrives, soon followed by his fiancée, Angele, and her idiot-savant cousin, Bebe. Lucien wishes to have one last fling with his mistress, Claudine, before he marries; he has made up a man named Dondidier, like Algernon's Bunbury, so that he may visit him in the country. His bride-to-be has a jealous admirer, Maurice, who persuades her to follow her future husband to witness his philandering.

Angele insists on meeting Dondidier, whom Lucien identifies as the Satyr. Angele sees Lucien having lunch with Claudine. Angele vows to marry Bebe, although she is not attracted to him and plans to be a cold and unloving wife. Lucien says that Claudine is Dondidier's wife, but Angele is not fooled ... until Claudine appears and backs up this story. Angele demands to know where in Paris Claudine and her husband reside. Claudine smoothly gives her an address, adding that Mr. Dondidier is an antiques dealer. It turns out that Bebe provided Claudine with the necessary facts, so that Angele would go ahead and marry Lucien. Having overheard Lucien claim that Dondidier is the Satyr, everyone wishes to meet him in Paris.

Act II

In Paris at the home of the curmudgeonly little antique dealer, his wife and the townswomen encourage the mousy man to demonstrate his talents as the famous Satyr. Two Greek statues, one of Aphrodite, the other of a satyr, have mysteriously disappeared from his shop.

Act III

At the Ball of the Nymphs and Satyrs, the Pink Lady resolves all of the complications, so that Lucien eventually marries Angele, Bebe remains faithful to his Canadian girlfriend, and Dondidier becomes more of a man to his wife.

== Roles and original cast ==
- Ida M. Adams – Desiree
- Hazel Dawn – Claudine
- Harry Depp – Crapote
- Alice Dovey – Angele
- William Elliott – Lucien Garidel
- Alma Francis – Serpolette Pochet
- Alice Hegeman – Madame Dondidier
- Maurice Hegeman – Dr. Mazou
- A. S. Humerson – Theodore Lebec
- Louise Kelley – Comtesse de Montavert
- Craufurd Kent – Maurice D'Uzac
- Frank Lalor – Philippe Dondidier
- F. Newton Lind – Pochet
- Eunice Mackey – Gabrielle
- W. Jackson Sadler – Philippe Dondidier
- John E. Young – Bebe Guingolph
- Florence Walton – Minette
- Fred Wright – Benevol

== Musical numbers ==
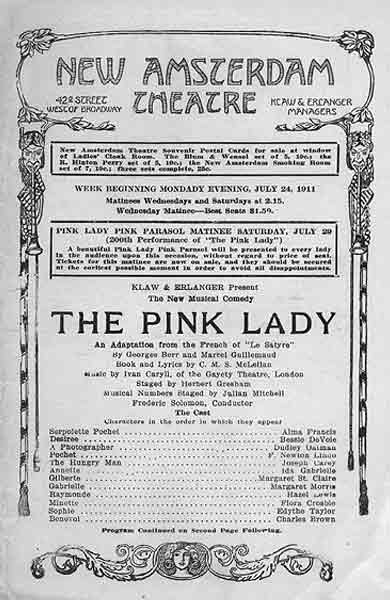
Programme for The Pink Lady

Act 1

- Here's a Lady – Desiree, Serpolette Pochet, Victims and Chorus
- Bring Along the Camera – Benevol and Chorus
- When Love Goes Astraying – Angele and Maurice D'Uzac
- The Girl by the Saskatchewan – Bebe Guingolph, Desiree, Victims and Chorus
- (Oh, So) Gently (lyrics by George Grossmith, Jr.) – Claudine and Chorus

Act 2

- The Intriguers – Lucien Garidel, Philippe Dondidier, Claudine and Crapote
- Donny Did, Donny Didn't – Comtesse de Montavert, Madame Dondidier, Philippe and Lucien
- The Kiss Waltz – Claudine
- Hide and Seek – Serpolette Pochet and Philippe
- The Duel – Claudine, Serpolette, Lucien and Maurice D'Uzac

Act 3

- Parisian Two-Step – Pan, Gabrielle, Serpolette and Chorus
- I Like It! – Philippe and Chorus
- (My) Beautiful Lady – Claudine and Serpolette
