= Rosencrantz and Guildenstern (play) =

Play by W. S. Gilbert

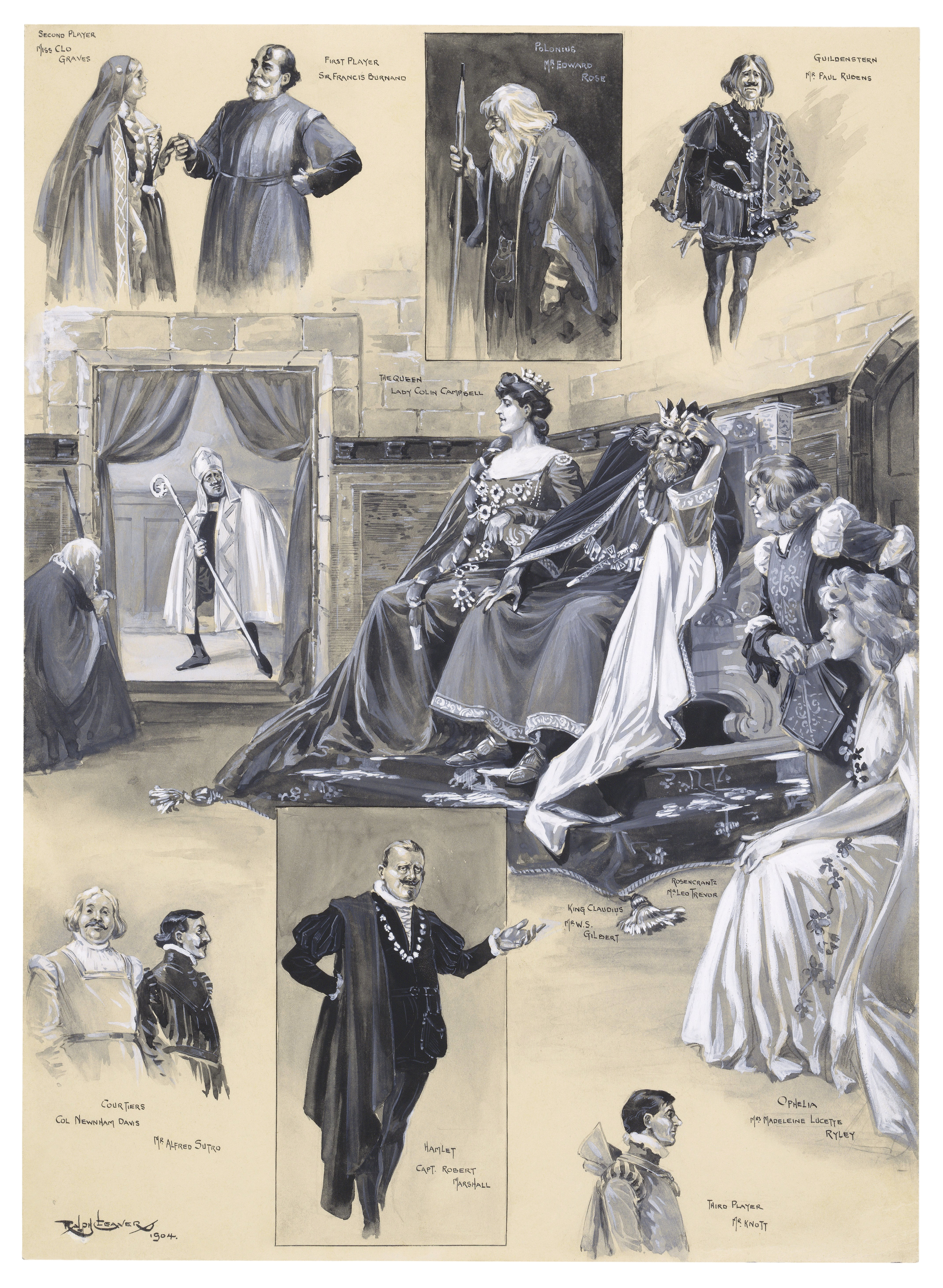
Illustration for a 1904 celebrity charity performance, with the author as Claudius

Rosencrantz and Guildenstern, A Tragic Episode, in Three Tabloids is a short burlesque play by W. S. Gilbert that parodies William Shakespeare's Hamlet. The main characters in Gilbert's piece are King Claudius and Queen Gertrude of Denmark, their son Prince Hamlet, the courtiers Rosencrantz and Guildenstern, and Ophelia. King Claudius reveals a dark secret: long ago he wrote a tragedy so bad that he has banned it from not only performance but all mention in the kingdom. Rosencrantz and Ophelia are in love and rid themselves of Hamlet and his annoying tendency to soliloquy by persuading him to present the tragedy; he is banished, and Rosencrantz and Ophelia marry.

After failing to find a producer for Rosencrantz and Guildenstern, and shortly after Henry Irving's hit production of Hamlet opened in London in 1874, Gilbert first published the play in the humour magazine Fun. The first performance of the burlesque in London's West End was not until June 1891, a benefit matinée at the Vaudeville Theatre. The play finally ran at the Court Theatre from 27 April 1892 to 15 July, about 77 performances, featuring Decima Moore as Ophelia, Brandon Thomas as Claudius, Gertrude Kingston as Gertrude and Weedon Grossmith as Hamlet.

An amateur performance in 1900 featured P. G. Wodehouse as Guildenstern. It played in New York City at the Murray Hill Theatre in 1900. A charity performance in 1902 featured Gilbert as Claudius, with Nancy McIntosh as Gertrude. Gilbert again played Claudius at charity performances in 1904 at the Garrick Theatre, which also featured prominent playwrights of the day; in 1906, again with Gertrude Kingston as the Queen; and in 1908 at the Lyceum Theatre, starring Marion Terry as Gertrude.

A televised performance of the play was given in 1938 with Grahame Clifford as Claudius, Erik Chitty as Guildenstern and Leonard Sachs as Rosencrantz. Other amateur performances were given during the 1890s, and both amateur and professional productions have been given in the 20th century and since. The play has been described as "the best [Shakespeare burlesque] from a literary point of view".

== Background and publication ==
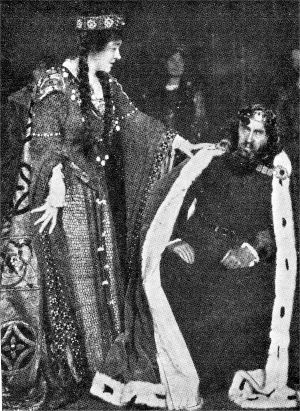
W. S. Gilbert and Marion Terry in Rosencrantz and Guildenstern, 1908

Early in W. S. Gilbert's career, from 1866 to 1869, he wrote a series of burlesques parodying famous operas. For the first of these, Dulcamara, or the Little Duck and the Great Quack, the director was an actor-director who was new to London, Henry Irving. Irving and Gilbert became friendly, but after the production, the two went their separate ways. Also early in his career, from 1865 to 1871, Gilbert wrote an extensive series of comic pieces for the humour magazine Fun, 65 of which were dramatic parodies or reviews in the form of dramatic parodies.

Early in a busy 1874 for Gilbert he wrote Rosencrantz and Guildenstern. He first offered the little burlesque to Irving, who by now had joined the company of the Lyceum Theatre, London, achieving success in the melodrama The Bells (1871). Irving showed interest but became busy with other projects. Gilbert next offered it to William Montague at the Globe Theatre, who also expressed interest but later became unavailable. Next, according to the Gilbert biographers Jane Stedman and Andrew Crowther, Gilbert likely tried his friend Marie Litton and her Court Theatre company, where the play was rehearsed but not produced.

Failing to find a producer, he apparently offered the little piece to his old friend Tom Hood, the editor of Fun, but Hood died in November of that year before it was published. Nevertheless, shortly after Hood's death, Gilbert allowed Fun to publish the burlesque, along with two illustrations that he drew for it, as a favor "in this time of crisis" for Fun because of his old association with the paper, even though he was unhappy with Fun's choice of the new editor to succeed Hood. Rosencrantz and Guildenstern was published in three weekly installments in December 1874; it was Gilbert's last contribution to Fun and the only one of his dramatic parodies to later receive theatrical productions. Meanwhile, on October 31, 1874, Irving had mounted Hamlet at the Lyceum and played Prince Hamlet. He earned critical accolades, and the production was "staggeringly successful", as it set a new record for a Shakespeare revival, running for 200 performances. Gilbert added to the dénouement of his burlesque a reference to the Lyceum Theatre, and the character of Hamlet is implied to satirise Irving's portrayal of the prince and his adaptation of Shakespeare's text, as well as those of other famous Victorian Shakespearean leading men.

Rosencrantz and Guildenstern, like Hamlet, is written mostly in blank verse, with occasional use of prose and rhymed couplets; aside from its Shakespearean parody of Hamlet, including mocking the soliloquys by turning them into riddles, the piece satirises Victorian burlesque itself, including cross-dressing characters and the self-indulgence of the famous Victorian Shakespearean actor-managers in their extravagance of business, make-up and costuming, their varied nationalities, supposed vanity and interpretations of whether or not Hamlet was sane.

Over the following years, little more was heard about Rosencrantz and Guldenstern, while Irving established himself as the leading Shakespearean actor in Britain, and Gilbert collaborated with Arthur Sullivan on their extraordinarily successful and enduring series of comic operas. Finally, in 1890, Gilbert re-published the burlesque in his collection Foggerty's Fairy and Other Tales.

== Synopsis ==
Tableau I

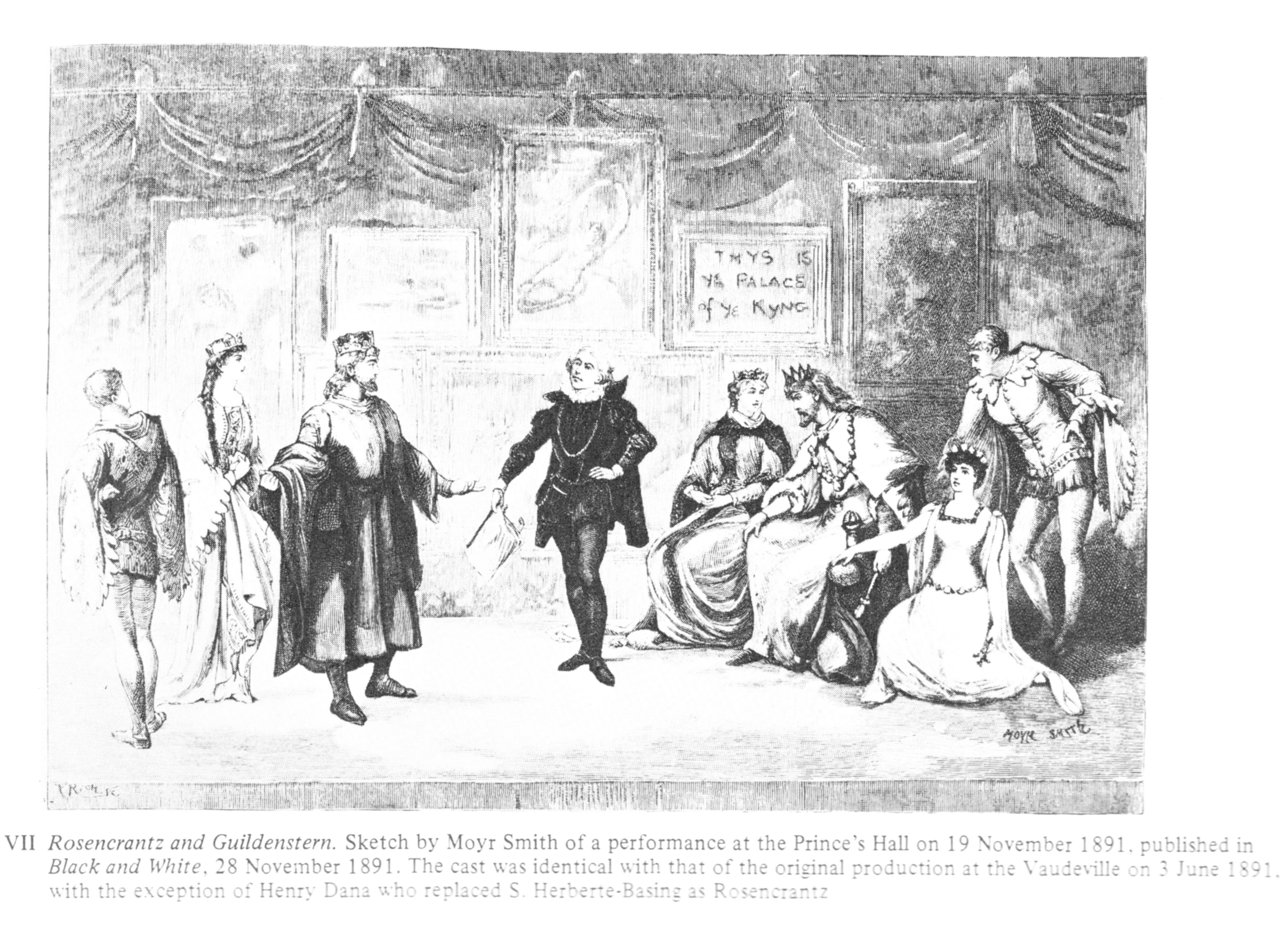
1891 illustration from an early production with the original cast

King Claudius of Denmark confesses to his wife, Queen Gertrude, a secret of his youth that weighs heavily on him: he wrote a five-act tragedy. The tragedy closed not halfway through the first act as a result of derisive laughter from the king's invited audience. The humiliated Claudius decreed that anyone who mentions the play must be executed. The king puns: "The play was not good – but the punishment of those that laughed at it was capital." The queen counsels Claudius to forget about it and changes the subject: The solitary Prince Hamlet suffers from an alarming "tendency to long soliloquy". To cheer him up, she has sent for two "merry knaves", Rosencrantz and Guildenstern, to divert him with entertaining revels. Perhaps they will also cheer the king.

Rosencrantz has loved Hamlet's fiancée, Ophelia, since babyhood. Upon being reunited with the courtiers, she relates that Hamlet's sanity is in doubt ("Opinion is divided. ... Some [say] that he's really sane, but shamming mad") and they all scheme to break her unwanted engagement to the mercurial prince by persuading Hamlet to play Claudius' tragedy before the king and thereby incur death. The only surviving copy is in the study of Ophelia's father, the Lord Chamberlain (the state censor). Ophelia is confident that she can steal it – her father sleeps very soundly after reading all the "rubbishing" new plays each day.

Tableau II

Rosencrantz and Guildenstern tell the Queen that they will have Hamlet play a leading part in some court theatricals to distract him. Hamlet enters, and she begs them to prevent him from soliloquising. Hamlet begins, "To be – or not to be", but they interrupt him, anticipating the points he plans to make, and give him a dagger and revolver that he may use to commit suicide. Hamlet, in despair, responds: "It must be patent to the merest dunce / Three persons can't soliloquize at once!"

Ophelia has retrieved the weighty manuscript but is terrified by the ghosts from "five thousand plays" that haunt her father's study, "chattering forth the scenes ... / Why my poor father wisely had cut out". The conspirators show Hamlet the five-act tragedy "Gonzago" (without revealing its authorship). They use reverse psychology, seeming to discourage him from choosing it. They tell him that it is very long and all the parts are insignificant except his own – "A mad Archbishop who becomes a Jew to spite his diocese" and is forced to murder while soliloquising throughout the work, culminating in a spectacular death. Hamlet insists on performing the tragedy. .

Tableau III

All assemble for the revels. Rosencrantz tells the king and queen that Hamlet has chosen a tragedy but intends to play it for laughs, though he has tried to dissuade him. Before the play begins, Hamlet instructs his players on his theory of comic acting:

"I hold that there is no such antick fellow as your bombastical hero who doth so earnestly spout forth his folly as to make his hearers believe that he is unconscious of all incongruity".

The First Player responds indignantly that the actors know their craft. Soon the audience is roaring with laughing, except for Claudius, who realises with horror that it is his own banned play. Claudius furiously condemns Hamlet to death, drawing his dagger. Hamlet begs: "I can't bear death – I'm a philosopher!" Ophelia suggests that the King should send Hamlet to "Engle-land", where "dwell a cultured race". Claudius assents, commenting, "They're welcome to his philosophic brain." Hamlet is banished, and Rosencrantz embraces Ophelia.

== Productions ==
=== 1890 to 1892 ===
In 1890, Gilbert gave permission for two private drawing-room performances of Rosencrantz and Guildenstern. Soon afterwards, he gave his consent for a third performance in aid of a charity but learned afterwards that the producer, Elizabeth Bessle, intended to play the piece at the Vaudeville Theatre in London's West End and indicated his surprise in a letter to The Daily Telegraph, which it published in November. Bessle contacted Gilbert apologetically and asked if he might supervise a rehearsal and offer advice about how best to adapt the published version of the burlesque to the stage. Gilbert did so, and the matinee performance took place at the Vaudeville in June 1891 to benefit the Serpent Fund. The cast was Alexander Watson as King Claudius, Mrs. Theodore Wright as Queen Gertrude, Frank Lindo as Hamlet, Sidney Herberte-Basing as Rosencrantz, C. Lambourne as Guildenstern, C. Stewart as First Player, Elizabeth Bessle as Second Player, Mary Bessle as Ophelia. The piece received very positive reviews, which also mentioned that Lindo played the prince "in close imitation of Mr. Henry Irving", and at the end Hamlet was banished to the Lyceum. Gilbert refused Bessle the right to produce a theatrical run of the piece. In January 1892, Gilbert's comic opera The Mountebanks, with music by Alfred Cellier and Ivan Caryll, opened at the Lyric Theatre, nearly next door to the Vaudeville, and ran for 229 performances until 5 August 1892. Gilbert began writing it before the performance of Rosencrantz and Guildenstern at the Vaudeville, and The Mountebanks featured two characters who pretend to be, and then are magically transformed into, automated clockwork Hamlet and Ophelia, and Gilbert uses some of the same satire of the characters Hamlet and Ophelia that he used in Rosencrantz and Guildenstern.

The Court Theatre soon acquired the rights to produce the first theatrical run and played it as part of a triple bill from 27 April 1892 to 15 July, about 77 performances, with Brandon Thomas as Claudius, Gertrude Kingston as Gertrude, Weedon Grossmith as Hamlet, Mr. Elliot as Rosencrantz, C. P. Little as Guildenstern, W. L. Branscombe as First Player, May Palfrey as Second Player, R. Rochefort as Polonius and Decima Moore as Ophelia. Reviews were positive, but, despite the starry cast, not as enthusiastic as for the previous year's charity performance. At the end, instead of being banished to the Lyceum, Hamlet was banished to "Engle-land" (a production of Hamlet by another famous actor-manager, Herbert Beerbohm Tree, was then playing at the Haymarket Theatre); the same ending was used in productions and re-publications thereafter.

=== 1900 to 1908 ===
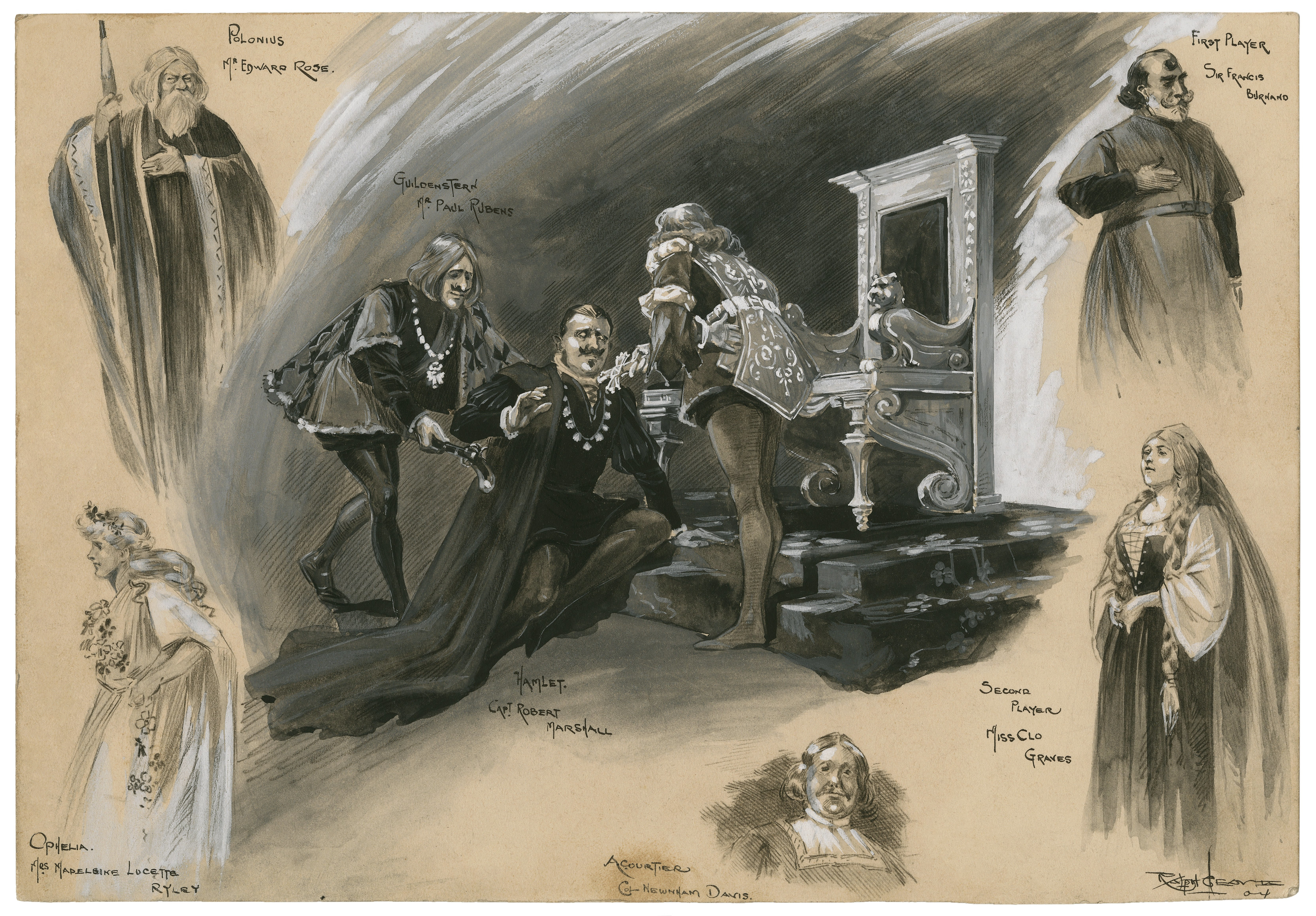
Another illustration of the 1904 charity performance.

An amateur performance in 1900 featured P. G. Wodehouse as Guildenstern. The play was also given a performance in New York City at the Murray Hill Theatre in 1900. In 1902 Gilbert himself played Claudius, with Nancy McIntosh as Gertrude in four performances to benefit the Bushey Health Cottage Hospital. The cast also featured Capt. Robert Marshall as Hamlet, who was to play the role in three further charity productions alongside Gilbert, and Mrs Charles Crutchley as Ophelia; the press reports were effusive, as reports of charity benefits often are. Gilbert again played Claudius alongside Marshall at a charity performance in 1904 at the Garrick Theatre again to benefit The Bushey Heath Cottage Hospital, as part of a bill with Gilbert's Harlequin and the Fairy's Dilemma. The cast also included several playwrights of the day and other prominent amateur actors; Lady Colin Campbell as Gertrude, Leo Trevor as Rosencrantz; Paul Rubens as Guildenstern, Francis Burnand as First Player, Clo Graves as Second Player, Madeleine Lucette Ryley (now semi-retired) as Ophelia, and as courtiers, Alicia Ramsey, Gladys Buchanan Unger, Edward Rose, Alfred Sutro and Col. Newnham Davis. The advertised cast included George Bernard Shaw, Anthony Hope and Henry Arthur Jones, but they did not appear in the performance. The performance received widespread press coverage and was again much praised, as was the acting of Gilbert, Marshall and Burnand. Of Gilbert's acting, The Times wrote: "His Claudius was certainly admirable. He would play Claudius in Hamlet finely, only the part would give him no chance of making the 'points' he makes so well."

Another charity revival in 1906 included three performances at the Elizabethan Faire and Fête in Lincoln's Inn to benefit the King's College Hospital Removal Fund. The cast again starred Gilbert and Marshall, alongside Kingston reprising the role of Gertrude, Trevor again as Rosencrantz, Wyndham Birch as Guildenstern and Mrs. Charles Crutchley again as Ophelia. The last of Gilbert's charity performances was in 1908, also to benefit the King's College Hospital Removal Fund, at the Lyceum Theatre, alongside Marion Terry as Gertrude, Marshall as Hamlet, Nigel Playfair as Rosencrantz, James Hearn as Guildenstern and Rosalie Toller as Ophelia. In attendance were Queen Alexandra and other members of the royal family, the piece was again much praised in the press.

=== Later ===
Both amateur and professional performances were given during the 20th century and since, including a flurry of activity in the 1970s; the review in The Observer of one in 1973 at the Open Space Theatre in London praised the "actors – maliciously, gaily satirically – joyfully pouncing on the neatly turned lines from W. S. Gilbert's pen dipped in others' ink. It is a histrionic fun-fair". The play continues to receive occasional productions, including by the Off-Monroe Players in 2020 and Gilbert and Sullivan Opera Victoria in Australia in 2024.

A television adaptation of the play was given in 1938 with Grahame Clifford as Claudius, Madge Brindley as Gertrude, Leonard Sachs as Rosencrantz, Erik Chitty as Guildenstern, Peter Ridgeway as Hamlet and Alexis France as Ophelia. An audiobook performance was recorded in 2019.

== Reception ==
A reviewer of the 1891 performance in The Times wrote: "Lines of the familiar topsy-turvey description abound in the dialogue, and the 'business' of the actors, which has also been devised by Mr. Gilbert, is hardly less amusing. In short, the little piece is a great success." The same newspaper had a positive reaction to the 1892 production. Their review of the 1904 production stated:

There is more brilliance of merely verbal wit in this little play than in anything else of Mr. Gilbert's. ... The temptation to dwell on the things that raise a laugh at every line is strong but there is a great deal more in the play than mere amusement. It is really a very subtle piece of criticism, sometimes of Shakespeare's play, sometimes of the commentators, sometimes of the actors who have played the great part.

— The Times

== See also ==
- Rosencrantz and Guildenstern Are Dead
- Rosencrantz and Guildenstern Are Undead
