= Maude Fulton =

American actress, playwright and screenwriter (1881–1950)

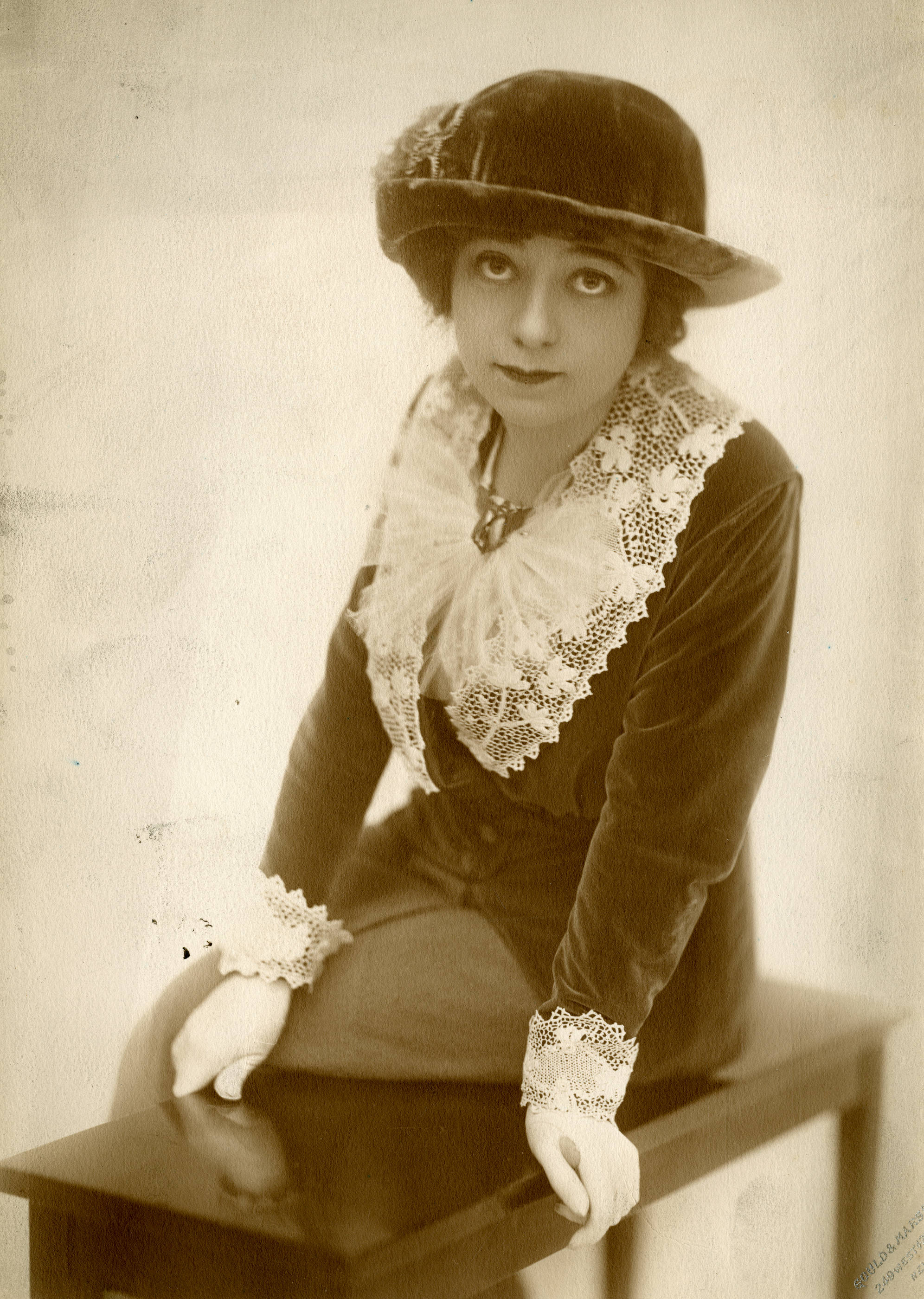
- Fulton in 1914
- Born: May 14, 1881; El Dorado, Kansas, U.S.
- Died: November 9, 1950 (aged 69); San Fernando, California, U.S.
- Occupations: Actress, Playwright, Screenwriter
- Years active: 1904–1950
- Spouse: Robert Ober (1920-1926; dissolved)

Maude Fulton (May 14, 1881 – November 9, 1950) was an American actress, playwright, stage director, theater manager, and later a Hollywood screenwriter.

== Early life ==
Born in 1881 in El Dorado, Kansas, she was the daughter of newspaperman Titus Parker Fulton and Lulu Belle Couchman. She grew up in El Dorado, Kansas and Lexington, Missouri, and worked as a stenographer, telegraph operator, and short story writer before becoming an actress. She first appeared on the stage in amateur productions in Aberdeen, South Dakota, in 1904.

== Career ==
On the opening night of Fulton's Broadway debut, in the cast of Mam'zelle Champagne (1906), Harry K. Thaw murdered architect Stanford White over the affections of Evelyn Nesbit.

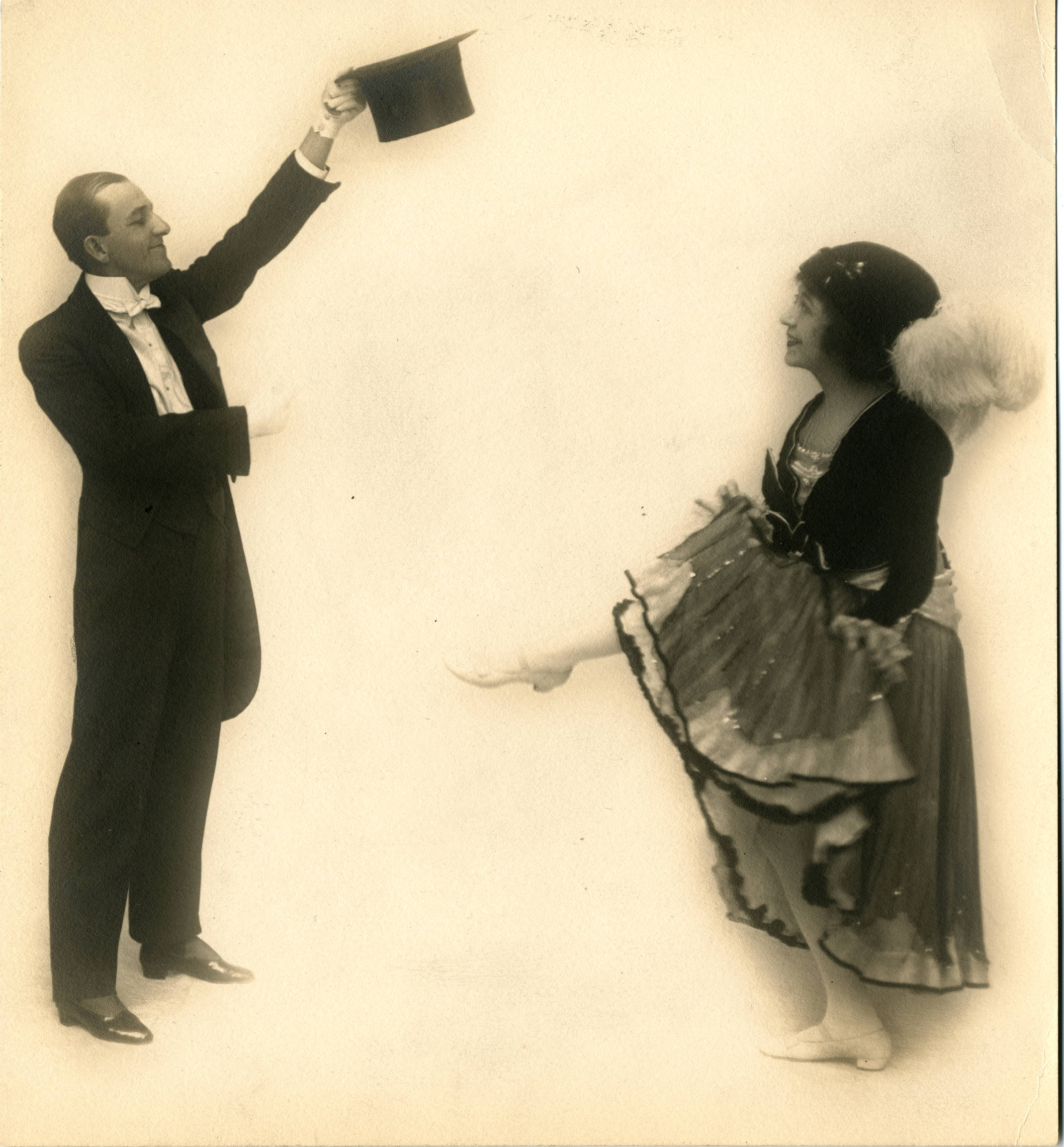
Maude Fulton and William Rock, circa 1913

In all, Fulton acted or danced in seven Broadway shows. She also appeared in vaudeville with William Rock, whom she met when he choreographed her on Broadway in The Orchid (1907) and appeared with her in Funabashi (1908) and The Candy Shop (1909).

Fulton's greatest personal success was the 1917 play The Brat, which ran for 136 performances. Written by Fulton, it was produced by Oliver Morosco, starred Fulton and John Findlay, and featured Lewis Stone and Edmund Lowe. The Brat was made into a 1919 silent picture starring Alla Nazimova, a John Ford talkie in 1931, and again as The Girl From Avenue A in 1940, with Jane Withers, Elyse Knox, and Laura Hope Crews.

She wrote another play, The Humming Bird, which opened on Broadway in 1923. It starred Fulton and Hilda Spong, and was directed by and featured her then-husband Robert Ober.

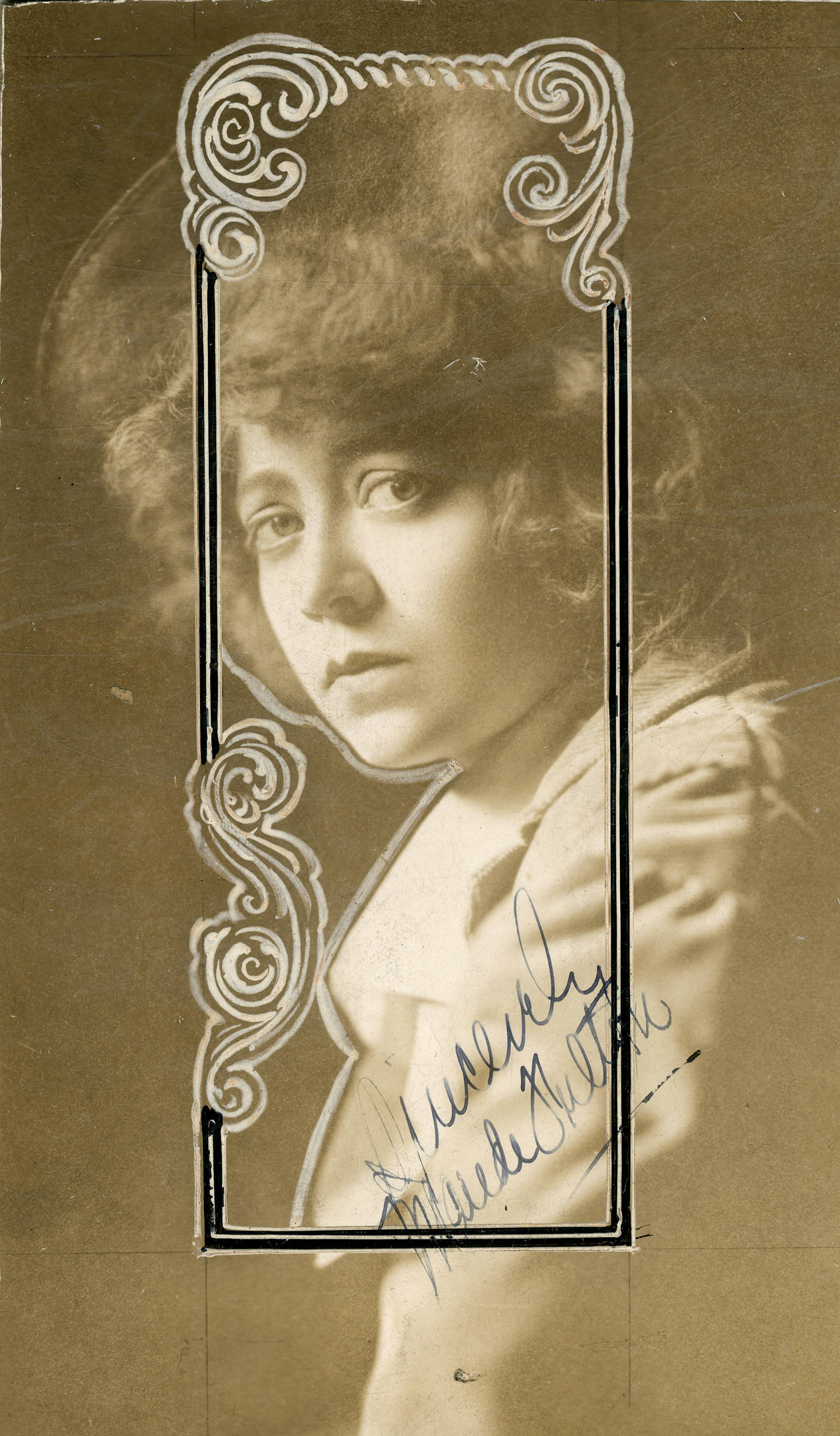
Maude Fulton, vaudeville entertainer, circa 1911.

During the silent era, Fulton wrote the intertitles for many pictures such as Lady Windermere's Fan (1925) with Ronald Colman and Don Juan (1926) with John Barrymore. She continued writing for films in Hollywood through the 1930s, with writing credits on a total of 21 pictures and acting credits on five.

== Personal life ==
Fulton and Ober were married from 1920–26, and had no children.

== Death ==
She died on November 9, 1950, in a San Fernando, California, hospital, aged 69. Her cremated remains are interred in the vault at the Chapel Of The Pines Crematory, Los Angeles California.
