= The Watch on the Rhine =

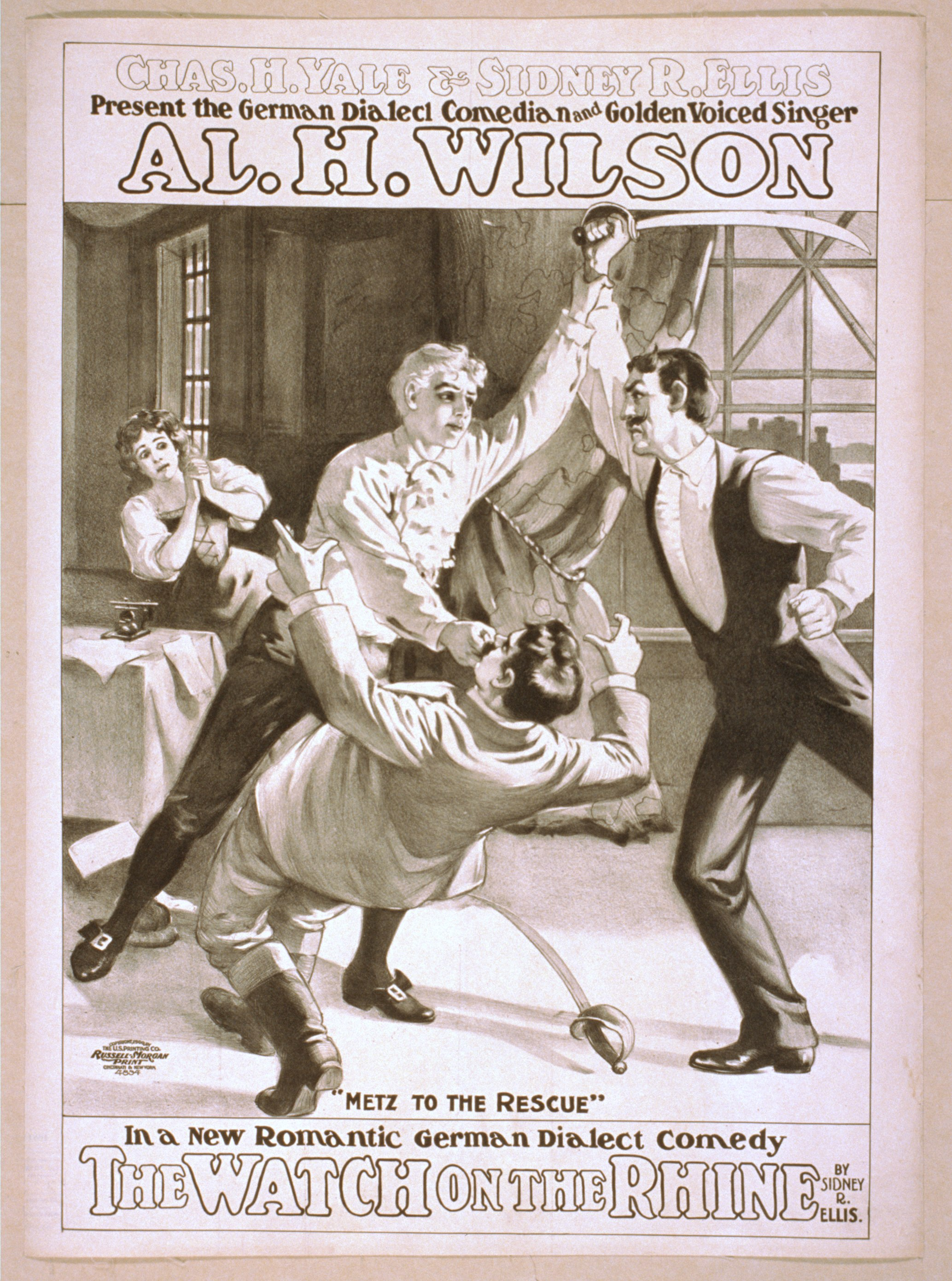
Poster for The Watch on the Rhine.

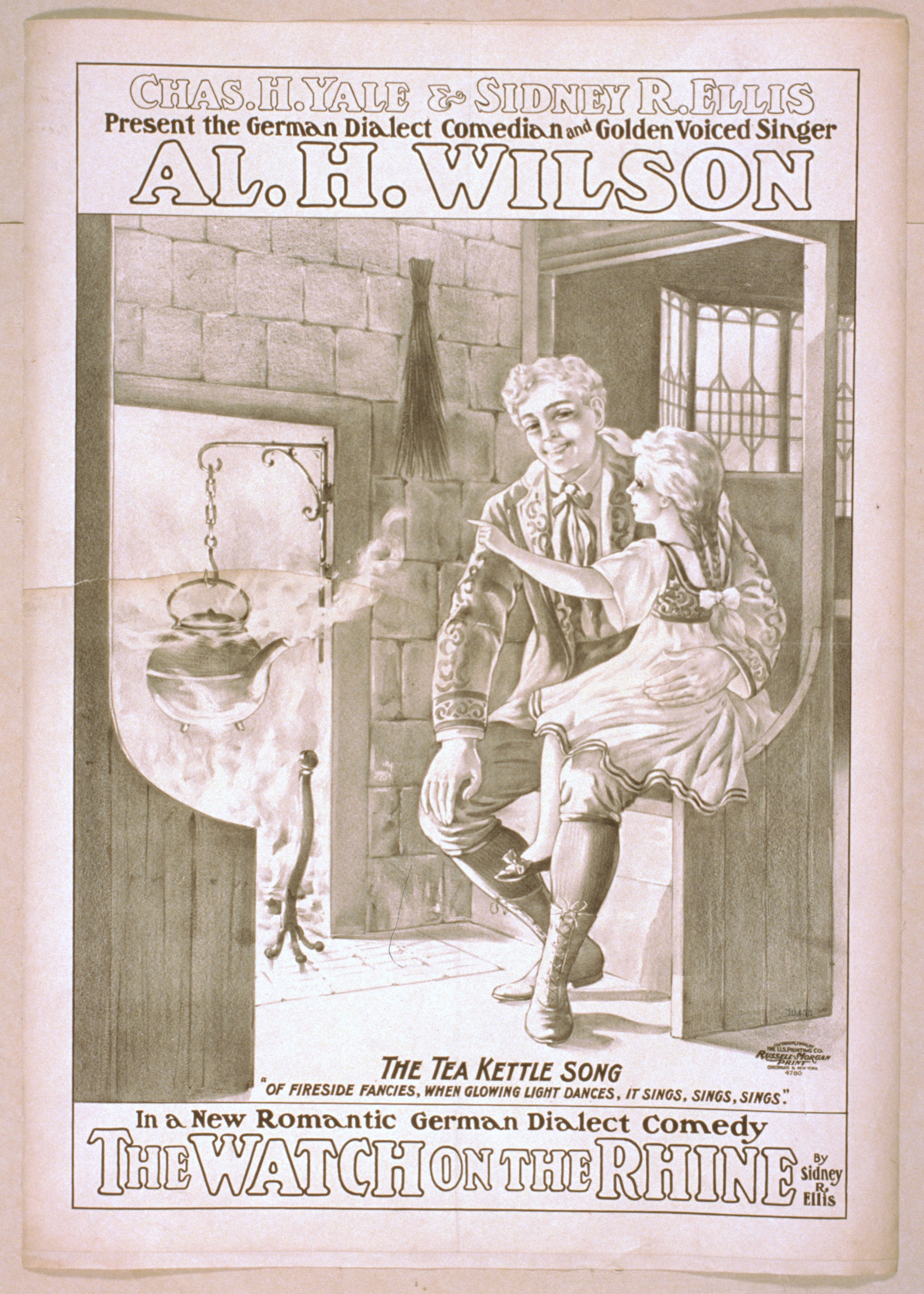
Poster for The Watch on the Rhine.

The Watch on the Rhine is a play with music in four acts by playwright Sidney R. Ellis. Ellis was also the lyricist for this work which used music by the actor and singer Al H. Wilson who was the star of this show. While technically a play, the work has been covered in musical theatre sources. The play premiered in 1900 and had a long tour on the road which included a stop on Broadway in 1905. The show included 9 songs; the best known of which was the yodeling song "In Tyrol" which was recorded by Wilson in 1906 for the Victor Talking Machine Company and later included in the anthology Music from the New York stage: 1890-1908 (1903, Pearl Records).

== Plot ==
Set in Germany in 1900 along the banks of the Rhine river, the plot follows Metz Stobel, a German American diplomat who is sent to Germany from Washington, D.C. by the U.S. government to investigate Count von Beckman whom they suspect is corrupt and deceptively working against U.S. and German relations. He meets Ulrich Steinway, an innocent man who has become a political target, and his sister, Norma. Metz and Norma fall in love. The Count threatens to hurt Ulrich while simultaneously promising to pardon him in order to manipulate Norma into steeling damning documents that could incriminate the Count. Ultimately Metz comes to the rescue, saves Ulrich, and unmasks the Count. All ends well.

== Performance history ==
The Watch on the Rhein was given its premiere at the Academy of Music in Reading, Pennsylvania on September 17, 1900. Actors listed in the cast at the time of the premiere included Al H. Wilson, Mark Price, Alfred D. Hastings, Pierce Kingsley, Maurice Dudley, John B. Walker, Ida Hamilton, Eva Byron, Fannie Bloodgood, and Celia Clay. The show had a long tour on the road which included a stop at the Murray Hill Theatre on Broadway where it ran for 9 performances in March 1905.

Some of the other theaters where The Watch on the Rhein played included the Holliday Street Theater in Baltimore (1900), the Grand Opera House in St. Louis (1900), the Grand Opera House in Kansas City, Missouri (1900), the Chatterton Opera House in Springfield, Illinois (1900), the Temple Theatre in Fort Wayne, Indiana (1900), the Great Northern Theatre in Chicago (1901), Sweeney & Coombs Opera House in Houston, Texas (1901), the Grand Opera House in San Antonio, Texas (1901), the Crescent Theatre in New Orleans (1901), the Capital Theater in Little Rock, Arkansas (1901), the Lyceum Theatre in Memphis (1901), the Grand Opera House in Atlanta (1901), the Park Theatre in Philadelphia (1901), the Academy of Music in Washington, D.C. (1901), the Academy of Music in Roanoke, Virginia (1902), the Bijou Theatre in Minneapolis, Minnesota (1902), the Belle City Opera House in Racine, Wisconsin (1902), the Teck Theatre in Buffalo, New York (1903), the Grand Opera House in Toronto (1904), and the Lyceum Theatre in Windsor, Ontario (1905). The tour was still going as late as May 1905 when it played at the Duquesne Theater in Pittsburgh, Pennsylvania.

=== 1905 Broadway cast ===
Cast list

- Al H. Wilson as Metz Strobel
- Ross O'Neal as Count von Beckman
- Rolinda Bainbridge as Norma Steinway
- H. H. Greene as Ulrich Steinway
- George A. Wright as Ludwig von Beckman
- Harry H. Fisher as Old Fireball
- Al T. Holstein as Watson Dobbs
- H. C. Haddock as Baron von Strange
- Florence Stover as Baroness von Menger
- Manda Hendrix as Telka Gregory
- Aurelie Durand as Mrs. Watson Dobbs
- Margaret Magraw as Little Dorothy
- Myles Mohn as Coach Driver
- Tony Wayland as First Officer
- L. H. Mast as Second Officer
