= St Martin's Theatre =

West End theatre in London

St. Martin's Theatre
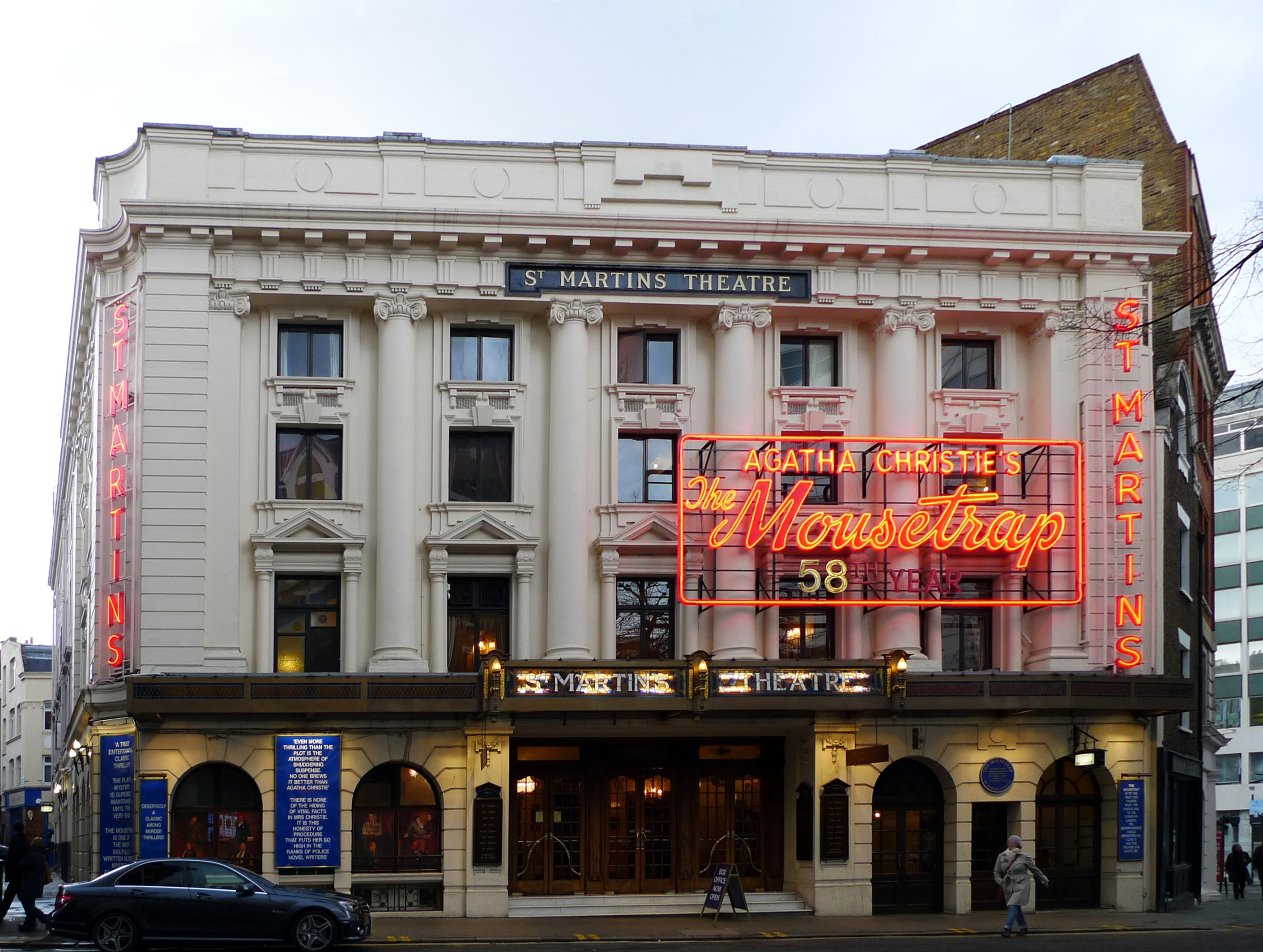
- St. Martin's Theatre in 2010
- Interactive map of St. Martin's Theatre
- Address: West Street; London, WC2; United Kingdom
- Coordinates: 51.512778°N 0.1275°W
- Owner: Lord Willoughby de Broke and Stephen Waley-Cohen
- Capacity: 550
- Type: West End theatre
- Designation: Grade II listed
- Production: The Mousetrap (since 25 March 1974)
- Public transit: Leicester Square

Construction
- Opened: 23 November 1916; 109 years ago
- Architect: W. G. R. Sprague

Website
- The Mousetrap official website

St Martin's Theatre is a West End theatre which has staged the production of The Mousetrap since March 1974, making it the longest continuous run of any show in the world.

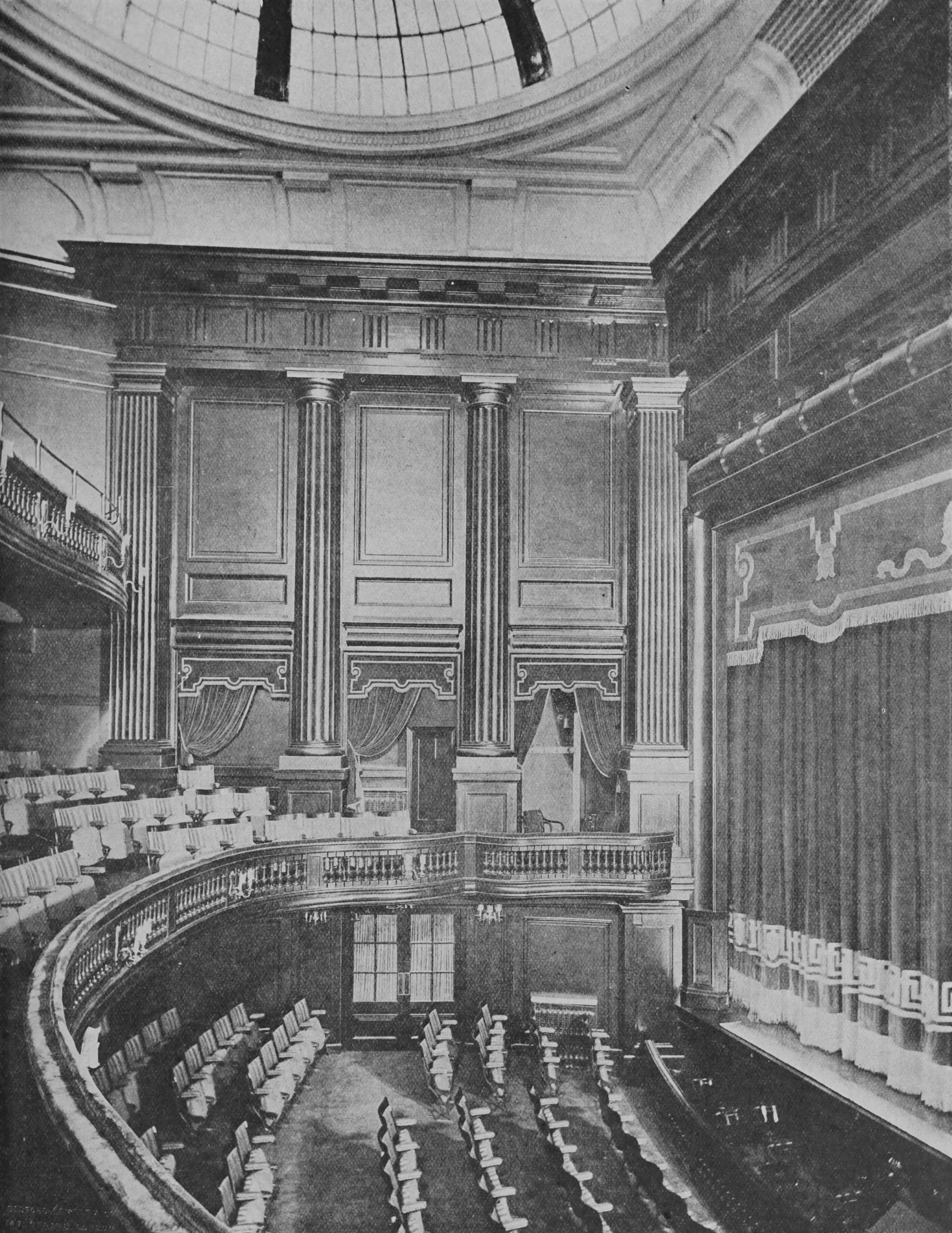
The interior as it appeared in 1916

The theatre is located in West Street, near Shaftesbury Avenue, in the West End of London. It was designed by W. G. R. Sprague as one of a pair of theatres, along with the Ambassadors Theatre, also in West Street. Richard Verney, 19th Baron Willoughby de Broke, together with B. A. (Bertie) Meyer, commissioned Sprague to design the theatre buildings. Although the Ambassadors opened in 1913, construction of the St Martin's was delayed by the outbreak of the First World War. The theatre is still owned by the present Lord Willoughby de Broke and his family.

The first production at the St Martin's was the spectacular Edwardian musical comedy Houp La!, starring Gertie Millar, which opened on 23 November 1916. The producer was the impresario Charles B. Cochran, who took a 21-year lease on the new theatre.

Many famous British actors passed through the St Martin's. In April 1923 Basil Rathbone played Harry Domain in R.U.R. and in June 1927 Henry Daniell appeared there as Gregory Brown in Meet the Wife. Successes at the theatre included Hugh Williams's play (later a film) The Grass is Greener, John Mortimer's The Wrong Side of the Park, and in 1970 the thriller Sleuth which starred Marius Goring for a long run as Andrew Wyke.

After Cochran, Bertie Meyer ran the theatre intermittently until 1967, when his son R. A. (Ricky) Meyer became administrator for the next two decades. The St Martin's has been listed Grade II on the National Heritage List for England since March 1973. In March 1974 Agatha Christie's The Mousetrap transferred from the Ambassadors to the St Martin's, where it continued its run until 16 March 2020 when the show had to be suspended due to the COVID-19 pandemic in the United Kingdom, holding the record for the longest continuously running show in the world. On 17 May 2021, the show was the first West End show to re-open and as of October 2026 has exceeded 30,500 performances at the St Martin's.
