= Murray Hill Theatre (Broadway) =

Broadway theater (1908–1951)

Coordinates: 40°45′4″N 73°58′34″W

The Murray Hill Theatre was a Broadway theatre located on Lexington Avenue between East 41st and 42nd streets in the Murray Hill neighborhood of Manhattan in New York City. It operated as a legitimate theatre for plays, musicals, and operas until it became a part of the Columbia Amusement Company's chain of burlesque theaters in 1908. The theatre was acquired by the motion picture empire of Marcus Loew, and re-opened as a movie theatre, Loew's 42nd Street Theatre, in 1917. It continued to operate as a movie theatre until it was demolished in 1951.

== History ==
The Murray Hill Theatre was built by impresario Frank B. Murtha and opened on October 19, 1896, with the world premiere of Oscar Weil and Charles Dazey's opera In Mexico, 1848; a work performed by The Bostonians. It had a seating capacity of 1500 people. Over the next decade the theatre was leased to two different theatre companies: first the Murray Hill Theatre Stock Company of Henry V. Donnelly and later a theatre company led by W. T. Keogh.

In 1904, the theatre began a slow shift away from the legitimate plays, musicals, and operas it had presented earlier and became a theatre for burlesque and vaudeville entertainments; ultimately becoming one of the many burlesque theaters operated by the Columbia Amusement Company (COA). The COA began operating the theatre after being granted a theatre license by the New York City Council on May 1, 1908. Under their tenure, the theatre was host to Will Rogers in 1910.

The theatre was purchased by Marcus Loew and after some remodeling, re-opened as the movie theatre Loew's 42nd Street Theatre in 1917. It continued to operate as a movie theatre until it was demolished in 1951.

== Partial list of productions ==
- Rosencrantz and Guildenstern (1900)
- The Watch on the Rhine (1905)
- Gay New York (1906)
