= Frances White (vaudeville) =

American vaudeville performer

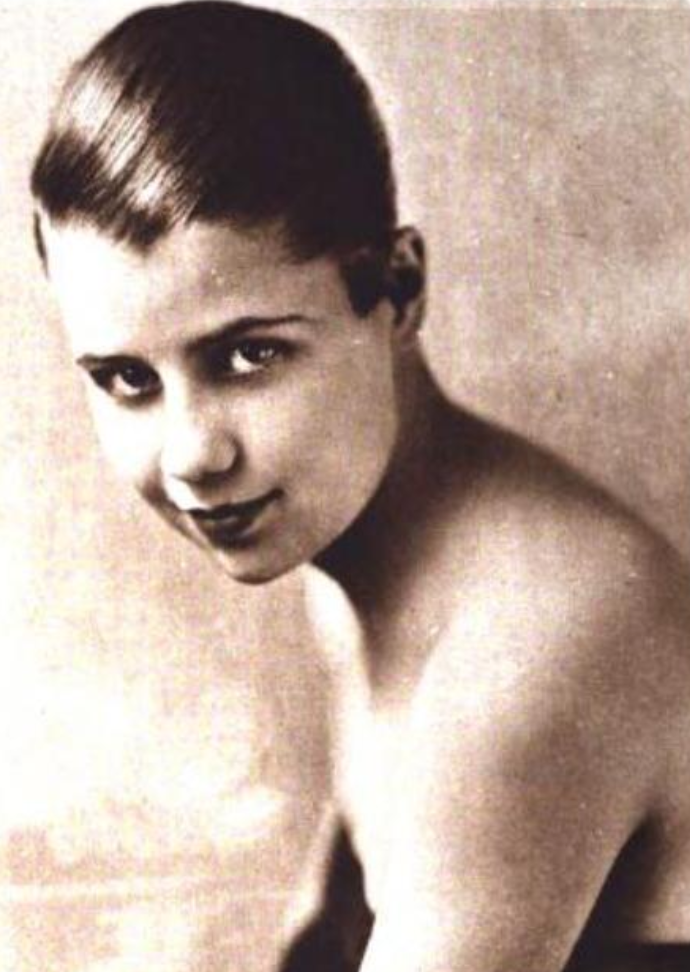
- Frances White, from a 1920 publication
- Born: Frances Mae Caples; January 1, 1896
- Died: February 25, 1969 (aged 73); Los Angeles, California
- Other names: Frances White Fay, Frances White Donnelly
- Occupations: Actress; singer; vaudeville performer
- Spouse(s): Lonnie Garwood (m. 1910, annulled) Frank Fay (m. 1917; div. 1917) Clinton Donnelly (m. 1923, divorced)

Frances White (born Frances Mae Caples; January 1, 1896 – February 24, 1969) was an American singer and actress on Broadway, on the vaudeville stage, and in silent films. She popularized the spelling song "M-I-S-S-I-S-S-I-P-P-I". She played "Fanny Warden" in The New Adventures of J. Rufus Wallingford (1915), a series of silent short comedies. She was also in the cast of the eugenics film The Black Stork (1917).

== Early life ==
Frances Caples was the daughter of Edward T. Caples and Caroline Leibfried Caples. Her grandfather was a wealthy Texas banker. She may have been from Texas, San Francisco, Los Angeles, or Seattle (sources vary on this point).

== Career ==
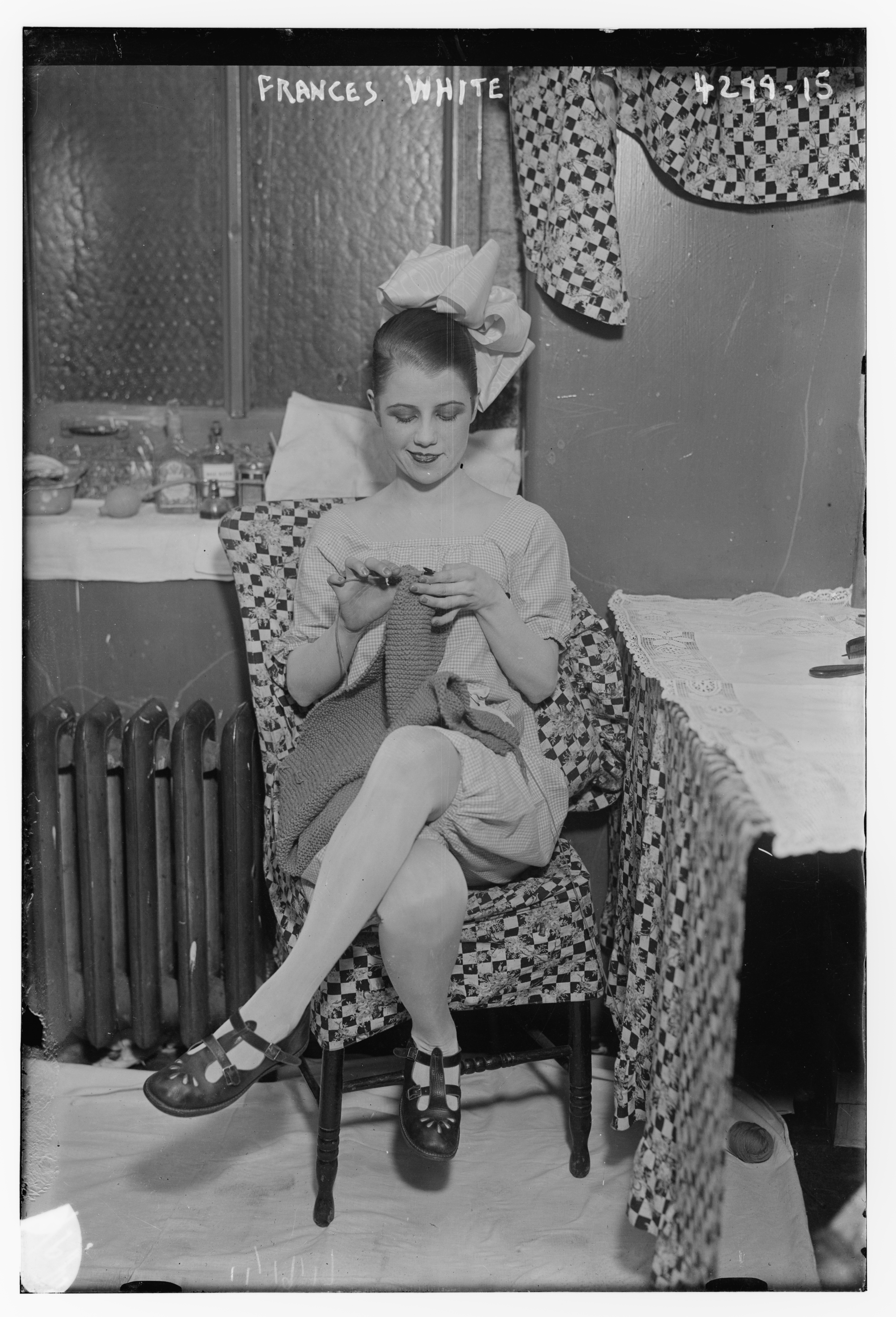
Frances White, knitting, from a 1917 newspaper photo

White began her stage career in Los Angeles in 1910. She joined William Rock; the duo Rock & White found success on the vaudeville circuit with a musical comedy and dance act before they split in 1919. She was a "child impersonator", wearing gingham rompers and an oversized hair bow; in this guise, she was known for popularizing the spelling song "M-I-S-S-I-S-S-I-P-P-I". She was also known for a very short "neat and smart" haircut, brushed back to the nape with oil.

White played "Fanny Warden" in The New Adventures of J. Rufus Wallingford (1915), a series of silent short films starring Burr McIntosh and Max Figman. She was also in the cast of the eugenics film The Black Stork (1917). Her Broadway credits included roles in Ziegfeld Follies of 1916, Hitchy-Koo (1917), Let's Go (1918), Ziegfeld Midnight Frolic (1919), Jimmie (1921), and The Hotel Mouse (1922).

White's last film role was in Face to Face (1922), with Marguerite Marsh. "This unique actress knows her limitations and flatly refuses to be anything but her breezy, slangy, fresh young self," said a 1925 newspaper profile. Also in 1925, she explained to Lorena Hickok that the distinctive sound of her voice was the result of a tonsillectomy.

== Legal problems ==
In 1922, Frances White was sued for alienation of affections by Dorothy Wolfe Stothart, the wife of composer Herbert Stothart. A Seattle jeweler sued White for money owed in the late 1920s. In 1930, she was briefly jailed for failure to pay a taxi fare in New York City. In 1931, she declared bankruptcy.

== Personal life ==
White first married in 1910, at age 14, in Mexico, to her co-star Lonnie Garwood; the marriage was quickly annulled. She next married comedian Frank Fay in 1917; they soon divorced. She married again, to businessman Clinton Donnelly in 1923; they too divorced. She lived with her mother in New York City and Los Angeles, until her mother's death in 1955. White died in 1969, aged 73 years, in Los Angeles
