= William Rock =

American vaudeville performer

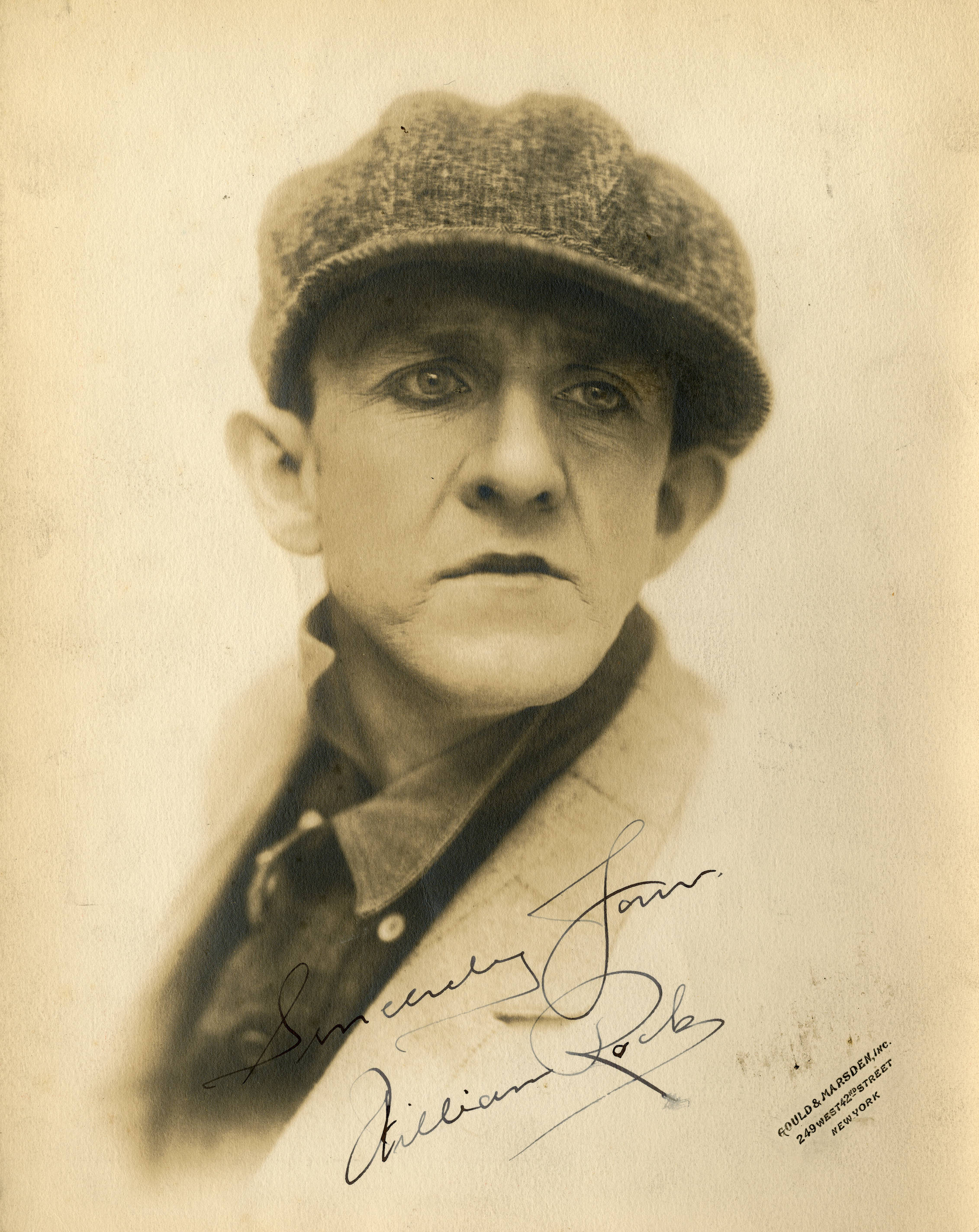
- Born: William Baker Rock; August 5, 1872; Evansville, Indiana, U.S.
- Died: June 27, 1922 (aged 49); Philadelphia, Pennsylvania, U.S.
- Occupations: Comedian and dancer

William Baker Rock (August 5, 1872 – June 27, 1922) was an American vaudeville comedian and dancer.

== Life and career ==
He was born on August 5, 1872, in Evansville, Indiana, to William Beverly Rock and Matilda Baker. His early career was in musical comedy, before he teamed up with Maude Fulton in the vaudeville act of Rock and Fulton. He is credited with being the first vaudeville performer to have a band accompanying his act on stage, and also one of the first to condense a Broadway musical into a vaudeville act.

After Fulton left to become a solo performer, he formed a duo with former chorus girl Frances White (1898–1969), as Rock and White. They made their debut together in 1916, but soon White became seen as the star performer, and the pairing split up in 1919.

Rock married Jane Ryder on October 5, 1905, in Manhattan, New York City. He later married Gladys Tilbury of Brighton, England. On July 6, 1921, he married Helen Eby of Altoona, Pennsylvania, who appeared with him in Hitchy-Koo.

On July 13, 1921, he was hospitalized and had one-third of his stomach removed. He died on June 27, 1922, at the National Stomach Hospital in Philadelphia, Pennsylvania, of cancer of the stomach. He was buried in Fairview Cemetery in Bowling Green, Kentucky.
