= Alfred Egerton Cooper =

English painter (1883–1974)

Alfred Egerton Cooper RBA, ARCA
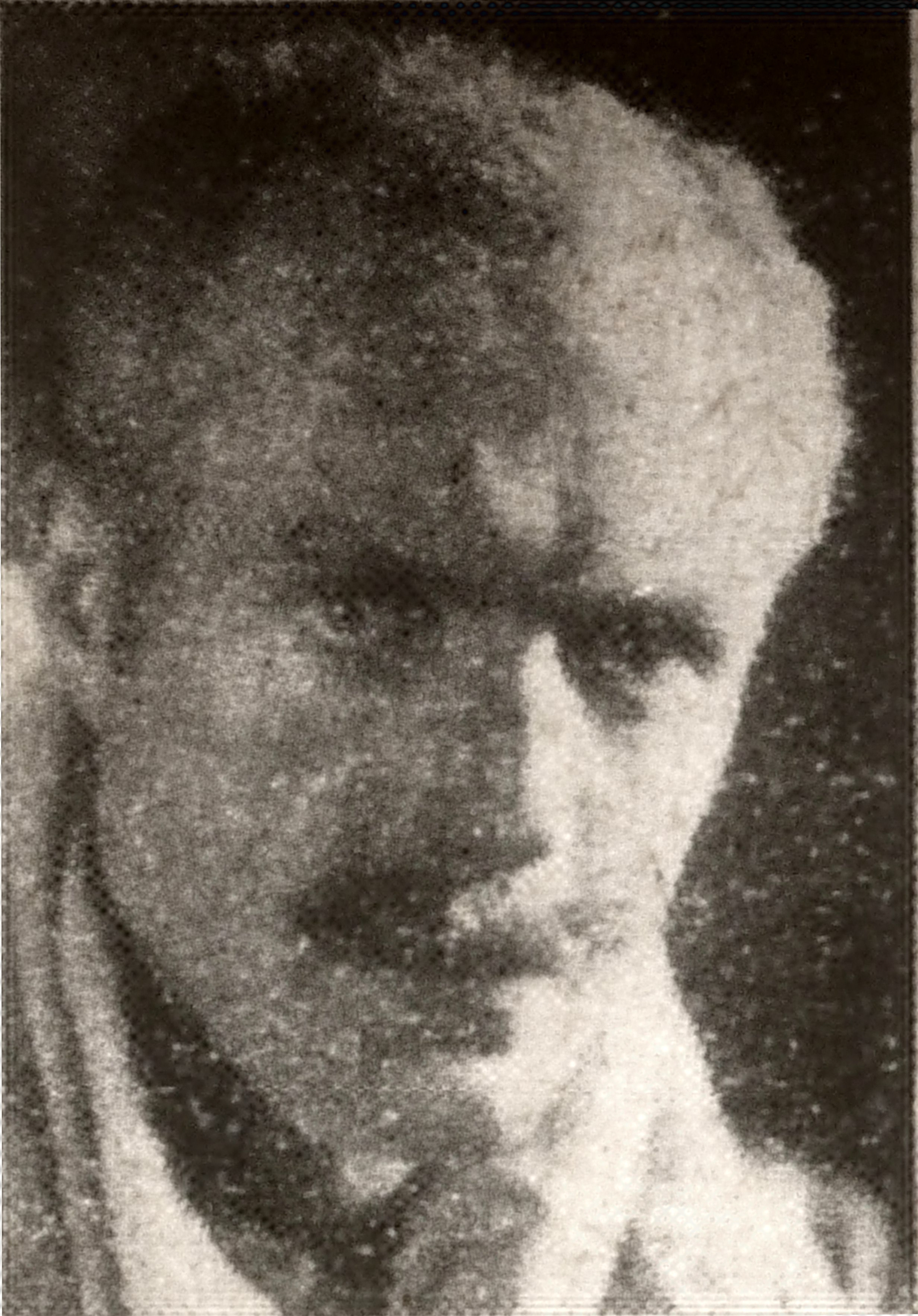
- Cooper in 1934
- Born: 5 July 1883; Tettenhall, England
- Died: 11 May 1974 (aged 90); Chelsea, London, England
- Resting place: Putney Vale Cemetery (cremation)
- Education: Durham School; Royal Academy Schools, Royal College of Art
- Notable work: Portraits of George VI, Winston Churchill, Barnes Wallis; paintings of airships
- Style: Impressionist, traditional

Alfred Ernest Egerton Cooper (5 July 1883 – 11 May 1974), RBA, ARCA, was a British painter of portraits, landscapes and other figurative work. In the era of Modernism, he continued to work in traditional style from his studio in Chelsea, London.

Cooper was an artist of modest origins who attended the Royal Academy Schools then became a scholarship student at the Royal College of Art. He lost most of the sight of one eye due to chlorine gas in the First World War. However, as the war ended, he was promoted to captain and official war artist of the RAF. After producing military paintings of aircraft and RAF personnel, he went on to paint King George VI, Winston Churchill and Barnes Wallis, besides various earls and other worthies. He was a teacher of art, he restored old paintings, and he produced sporting pictures, murals and paintings for illustrated newspapers. He took part in the painting event in the art competition at the 1948 Summer Olympics. His work is held in numerous collections, such as the National Portrait Gallery, the Imperial War Museum, the Guildhall Art Gallery and the Parliamentary Art Collection.

Cooper was married with one son and lived most of his life in London, where he was president of Chelsea Art Society. He was said to be "one of Chelsea's oldest and best-loved artists".

== Background ==
Cooper's maternal grandparents were Robert Speed (Foston c.1811 – Lincoln 1863), (Note: Deaths Jun 1863 Speed Robert Lincoln 7a 322.) a stocktaker (employee who takes inventory) at the ironworks, and his wife Sarah Hannah "Annie" or "Ann" née Jones (Heighington 17 January 1810 – Elkesley 2 October 1911), (Note: Deaths Sep 1911 Speed Ann 101 E. Retford 7b 23) whose portrait was painted by her grandson in 1901 when she was 95 years old. Robert and Annie married in 1858. (Note: Marriages Sep 1858 Jones Sarah Hannah and Speed Robert, Wolverhampton 6b 606) Annie had twelve children, forty grandchildren and about fifty great-grandchildren. She was still active outdoors in her 102nd year. Cooper's paternal grandparents were Thomas Cooper, a police officer, and Mary née Edwards. His father was Alfred John Cooper (born 12 February 1857), (Note: Births Mar 1857 Cooper Alfred John Wolverhampton 6b 451. The birth certificate says: Born twelfth February 1857 at Heath, Wednesfield. Name Alfred John Cooper. Father Thomas Cooper, police officer. Mother Mary Cooper née Edwards.) a railway clerk; later a political agent and relieving officer from Coven, Staffordshire. His mother was school mistress Sarah Hannah Sturges Speed (26 July 1859 – 1896/1897), (Note: Births Sep 1859 Speed Sarah Hannah Sturges Wolverhampton 6b 412. The birth certificate says: Born Twenty-sixth July 1859 at Steelhouse Lane, Wolverhampton. Name Sarah Hannah Sturges Speed. Father Robert Speed. Mother Sarah Hannah Speed formerly Jones. Father Robert Speed, stockbroker at ironworks. Informant Sarah Hannah Speed.) and his parents married at Trinity Chapel, Wolverhampton, on 19 June 1882. (Note: Deaths Jun 1897 Cooper Sarah 37 Stourbridge 6c 102. Marriages Jun 1882 Speed Sarah Hannah S. and Cooper Alfred Wolverhampton 6b 902. The marriage certificate says: At Trinity Chapel, Wolverhampton. Marriage date 19 June 1882. Names Alfred Cooper age 24 (railway clerk) of Chester Street Wolverhampton, and Sarah Hannah Sturges Speed age 22 of Oak Villa(s) Bradmore. Bachelor and spinster. Alfred's father: Thomas Cooper, carpenter. Sarah's father Robert Speed, insurance agent.) His sister was Winifred Mary Cooper (1886–1936), (Note: Births Sep 1886 Cooper Winifred Mary Wolverhampton 6b 547.) born in Wolverhampton, as was her mother.

Alfred Ernest Egerton "Fred" Cooper, was born on 5 July 1883, (Note: Births Sep 1883 Cooper Alfred Ernest Wolverhampton 6b 533. The birth certificate says: Born fifth July 1883 at 115 Dunstall Road, Wolverhampton. Name Alfred Ernest Cooper. Father Alfred Cooper. Mother Sarah Hannah Sturges Cooper formerly Speed. Father and informant Alfred Cooper, railway clerk.) in Tettenhall in the West Midlands. He lived in Cumberland until he began as a pupil of Durham School.

In 1920 when Cooper married Irene Florence Clements (21 July 1893 – Chelsea 1989), (Note: Births Sep 1893 Clements Irene Florence Hackney 1b 586 320. Marriages Dec 1920 Clements Irene F., Cooper Alfred E., St.Geo.H.Sq. 1a 1242. Deaths 1989 Cooper Irene Florence, 21 Jy 1893, Ken & Chelsea, registered 05.89, 13 1570.) Barnes Wallis was his best man. In 1973, Sir Barnes Wallis returned to Cooper's Chelsea studio for their golden wedding anniversary. Cooper was nicknamed "Peter the Painter" by his father-in-law, and his friends then followed suit, calling him "Peter" thereafter. Cooper and his wife had a son Peter C. Cooper (born 1925), (Note: Births Sep 1925 Cooper Peter C. Clements Fulham 1a 500.) who married and moved to the United States, and they visited him on eight occasions during the 1960s. Peter Cooper became an artist, and the director of the Grosse Pointe Art Gallery, Detroit, Michigan.

On Twelfth Night 1947 at Monte Carlo's Sporting Club, a party was held for a number of celebrities; Cooper and his wife Irene were photographed there. In 1951, they were living at 12 Jubilee Place, London S.W.3. That year they took ship from Colombo, Ceylon, to London, Cooper having executed paintings in Ceylon, including A Ceylonese Lady. Due to redevelopment, Cooper and his wife were obliged to move from Jubilee Place, so they came to Oakley Gardens, Chelsea, in 1970.

Cooper died at home at 4 Oakley Gardens, Chelsea, London, on 11 May 1974, (Note: Deaths Jun 1974 Cooper, Alfred Ernest E, 05 Jy 1883, Chelsea 11 1573) and was cremated on 16 May 1974 at Putney Vale Cemetery. He left £4,434 (equivalent to £42,038 in 2025).

=== Character ===
Cooper was described in The Times as "a generous man of great charm, a wonderful raconteur and well known to a wide circle of people in the art world". According to his son, Peter, Cooper "generally looked more like a retired British colonel than an artist, and always dressed to the nines, even in his studio". In 1922, the Daily Mirror quoted his opinion on Modernism:

He is unashamedly old-fashioned. He paints what he sees and dismisses more modern trends with a wave of the hand ... Though of the same generation as Picasso, he dislikes all this rubbish ... Picasso was good during – what do you call it – the Blue Period. But then, when he started doing all these things ... Mind you, he was never great, even during the Blue Period.

The Chelsea News and General Advertiser said that Cooper was "one of Chelsea's oldest and best loved artists".

== War service ==
During the First World War, Cooper served in the Artists Rifles (28th County of London Battalion), and then was commissioned as a captain on the staff of the RAF. Chlorine gas permanently damaged the sight of his right eye, so that he almost lost his sight, although he could still draw and differentiate colour. (Note: There is a photograph of Cooper wearing an eyepatch on his right eye in 1970 here: "Artist, 86", Kensington Post, 27 February 1970, p.45.) After his eye injury he became a war artist, "recording airships and views from them". Cooper became an official artist to the RAF by 1917, riding in various aircraft and taking aerial photographs. "He became an expert in the art and technique of large scale aerial camouflage, sketching and painting landscapes from a variety of aircraft".

During the Second World War, Cooper was producing newspaper illustrations of theatres of war, taking his information from photographs. In 1964 he had a cornea grafting operation to his right eye in Westminster Hospital.

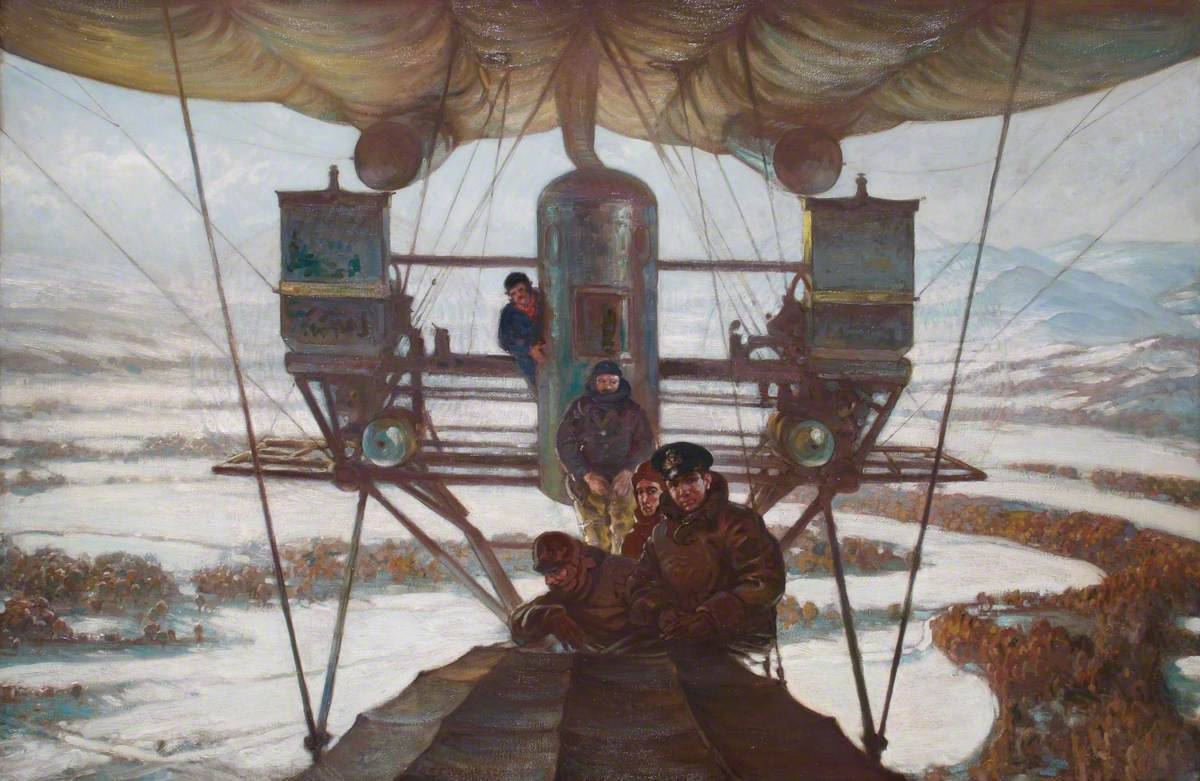
The First Snow, from the NS8 Airship over the Lammermuirs (1918), by Cooper

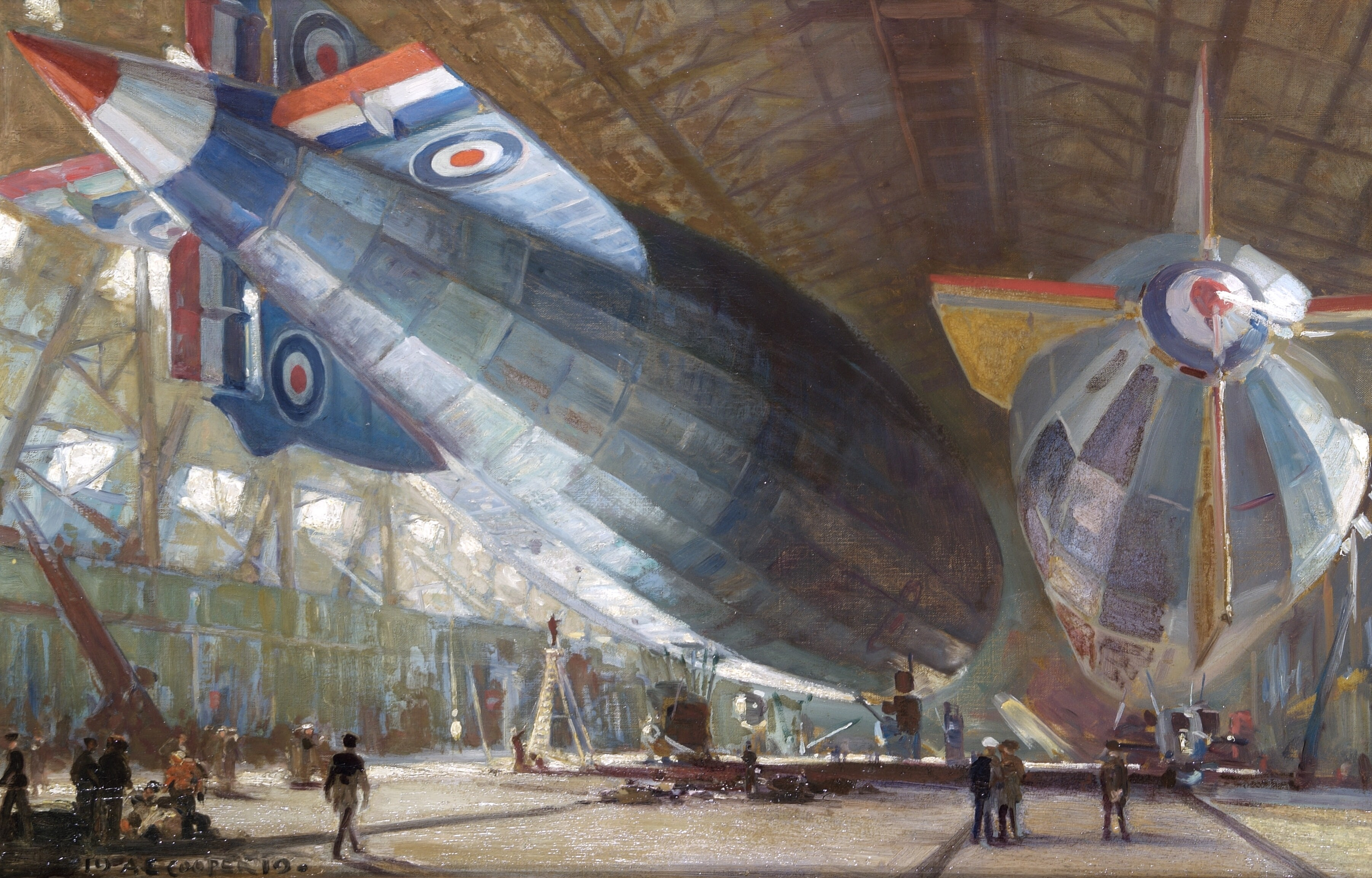
'r 34' and 'r 29' in the Shed at East Fortune (1919), by Cooper

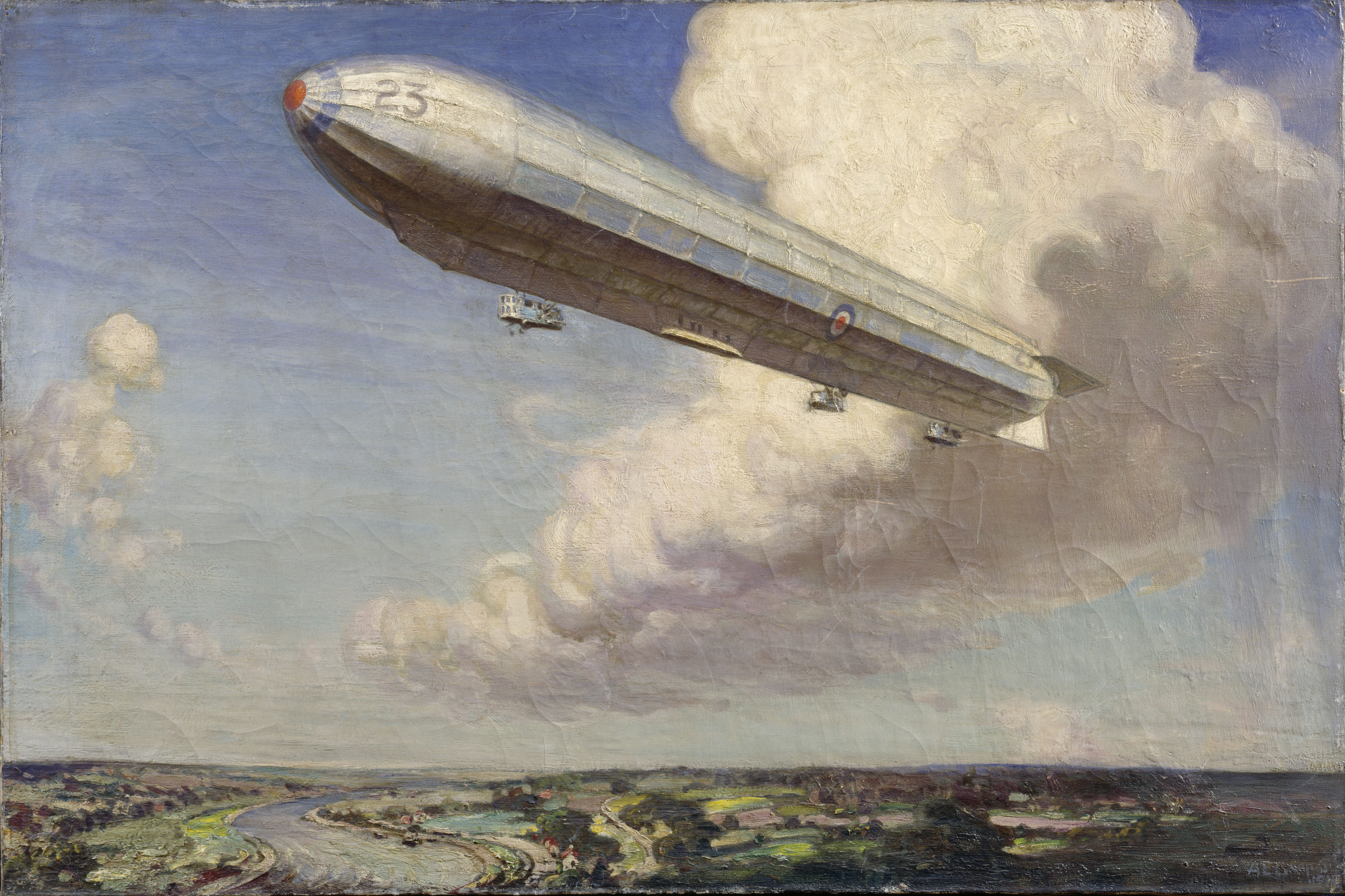
Airship 23 (1919), by Cooper

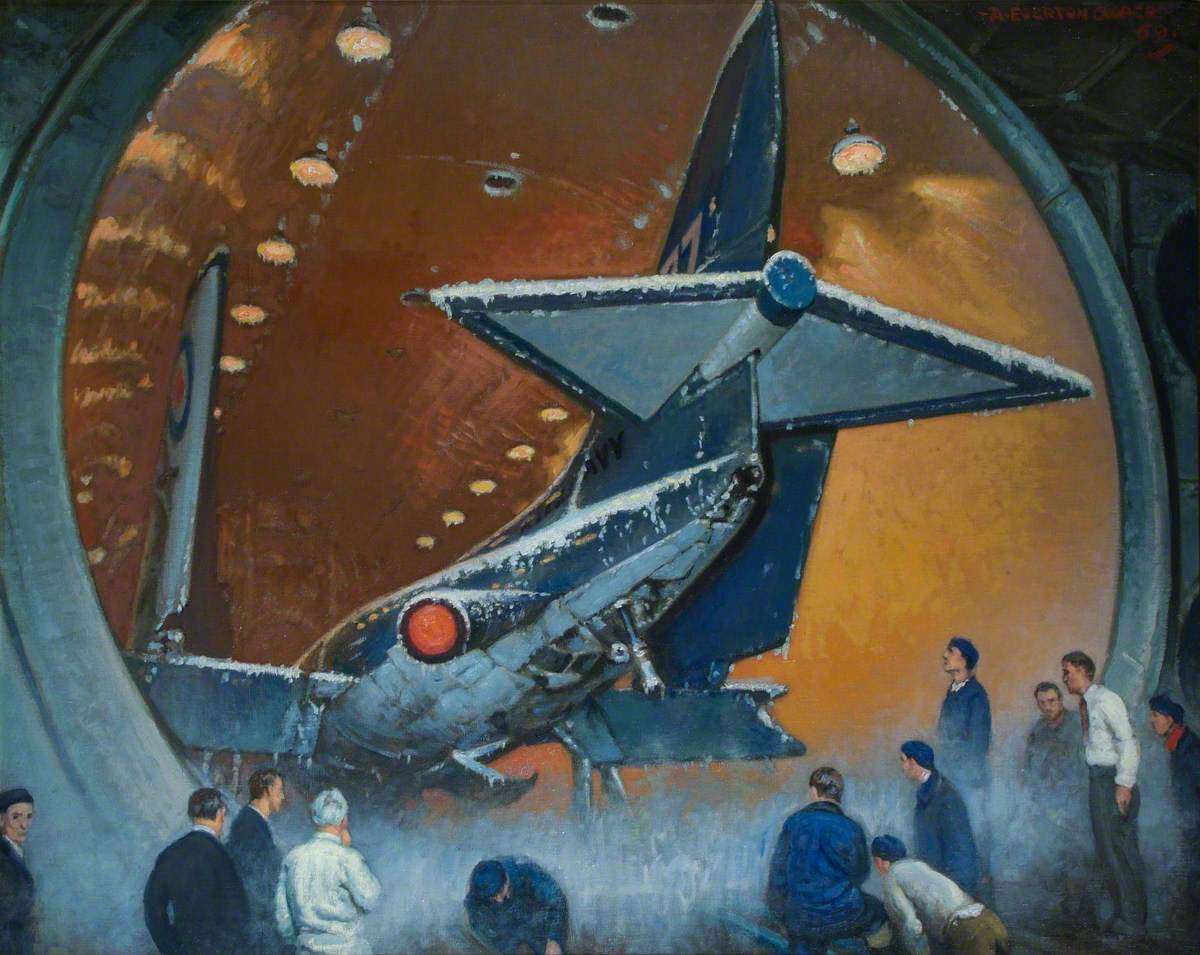
Scimitar Icing Tests (1959), by Cooper

== Career ==
=== Training ===
Cooper "painted on china at Worcester for four years before receiving any art training". He attended art school in the West Midlands and at Bilston School of Art, where "he won a Staffordshire Scholarship and five King's Prizes in one year". By the time he was seventeen, Cooper was describing himself as an artist/painter working from home, He trained at the Royal School of Art, from which he graduated in 1911. Having attained a Staffordshire county scholarship, in 1911 he became a student at the Royal College of Art (RCA) where he gained his diploma, and then taught there. By 1908 he had moved to Jubilee Place in Chelsea. So in 1911 the Census finds him as an art student aged 26, lodging in the West Kensington home of his uncle Thomas Millard, a jeweller's assistant. During his student years, Cooper was working for around twelve months in the studio of John Singer Sargent, filling in details and also backgrounds in Sargent's works. After leaving the RCA, "he was for a time employed by a decorative firm, and painted altar pieces and tapestries and restored old masters.

=== Occupation ===
Cooper said that John Singer Sargent, under whom he trained for a while, was his "greatest influence". Sargent was an Impressionist, and in 2012 Christie's categorised Cooper's work as impressionist. Cooper painted in gouache, oil on canvas and watercolour. He painted "a wide range of subjects from portraits to scenes on salmon rivers and views from airships". He also painted some "fine landscapes"; some of them were of the south coast of England, and he was "well known for his mural decorations". He was a teacher at the Hammersmith School of Art. He competed in the arts competition at the 1948 Summer Olympics, where his subjects included salmon rivers and horse racing.

Cooper's studio base between around 1920 and 1970 was in Glebe Place, Chelsea, London, close to his home in Oakley Gardens. Due to Cooper's preference for figurative art, he was finding it difficult to sell paintings by 1970, so he threw open his studio to the public between 24 February and 7 March 1970. The Daily Mirror reported:

His collection of more than 100 paintings there includes portraits, landscapes and nudes, all painted with traditional skill and realism. He is particularly proud of one bearded face which watches from the wall. It is his grandfather – the first portrait he painted at 18. I hadn't had one lesson at the time, he said, And I couldn't do it any better today. (Note: Cooper's grandfather, painted by Cooper when he was 18 (i.e. in 1901) is not likely to be Robert Speed, since Robert died in 1863; so it must be Cooper's paternal grandfather Alfred Cooper (death date unknown). The 1901 painting of Cooper's maternal grandmother Annie Speed is now at Wolverhampton Art Gallery.)

In 1922, Cooper and artists Thomas Eyre Macklin and Alfred Praga were chosen by the Daily Mirror to judge its youth beauty competition. Two artists' models were photographed demonstrating their costumes for the Chelsea Arts Club Ball at the Albert Hall on New Year's Eve 1930, in Cooper's studio. In 1949, Cooper was executing "many brilliant restorations" of old paintings for John Laviers Wheatley, director of Walter Victor Hutchinson's Gallery of British Sports and Pastimes at Hutchinson House, Stratford Place, London. In 1961, Cooper, as president of Chelsea Art Society, formally welcomed Pietro Annigoni to the studio above his own, in Glebe Place. In 1972, John Dunn of BBC Radio 2 recorded a one-and-a-half-hour interview at the Glebe Place studio, in which Cooper talked about "artists and his own life". It was broadcast in early August 1972. Cooper continued to work at his studio, almost until the end of his life at age 90.

== Selected works ==
=== Portraits ===
In 1933, Cooper's portrait of Blue Eyes, featuring a blonde woman with 1920s bob and flapper necklace, was reproduced in The Sphere newspaper. In 1940, Cooper executed portraits of King George VI in his naval uniform and as Colonel of the Royal Army Ordnance Corps, besides "countless earls". The George VI paintings now hang in the Cavalry Barracks, Hounslow and the Sea Cadets' Barracks. Cooper painted aldermen and recorders, plus three Lord Mayors of London, some scientists, and Barnes Wallis. As a staff captain and official artist for the RAF, Cooper painted official portraits of various British military personnel.

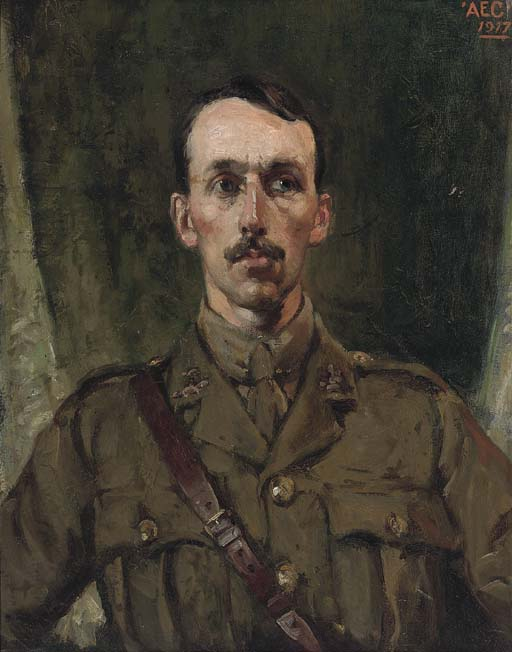
Portrait of an Officer from the Artists Rifles (1917), by Cooper. (Note: The 1917 Portrait of an Officer from the Artists Rifles is possibly a self-portrait, having facial details similar to later photographs of him.)

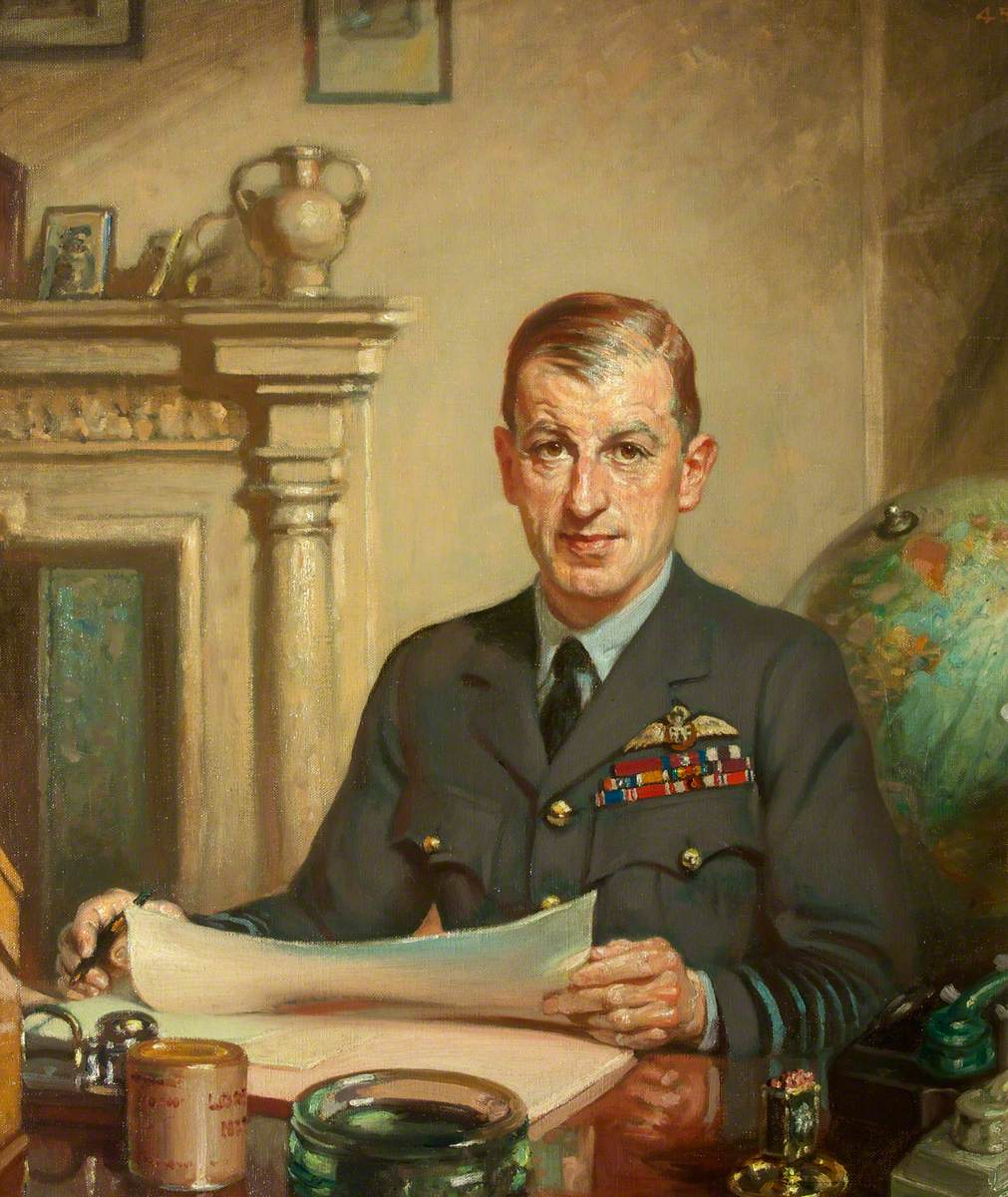
Marshal of the Royal Air Force Lord Portal (1945), by Cooper

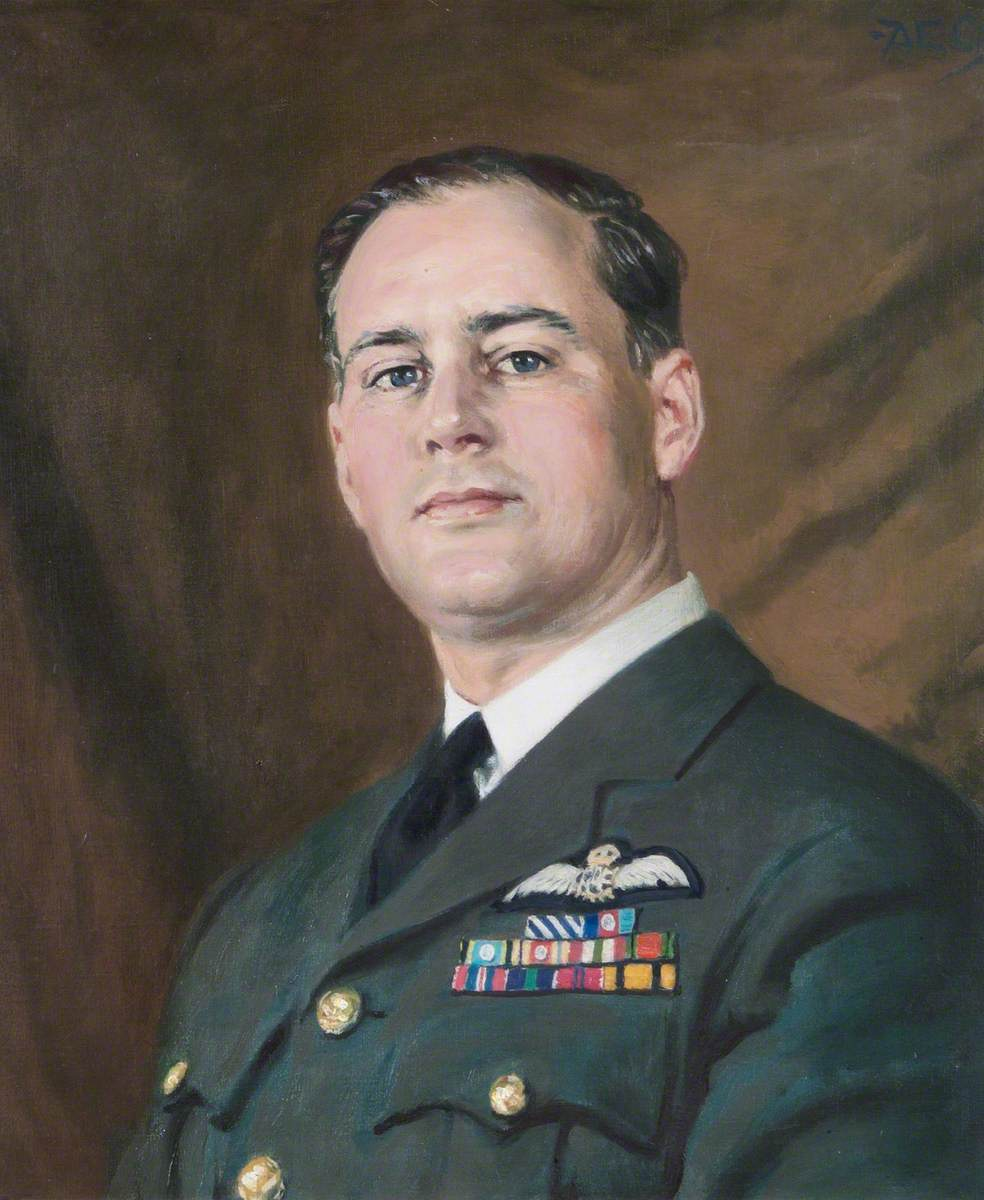
Group Captain Clair Grece, DFC (1945), by Cooper

==== Portraits of Churchill ====
Cooper produced five portraits of Churchill altogether. In 1943, Cooper painted the profile of Winston Churchill for the Junior Carlton Club. It became his "best known portrait", and later gained the title Profile for Victory after being "reproduced during the war in large numbers", and being hung in the Royal Academy Summer Exhibition of that year. According to his son Peter, Cooper "considered this to be his finest work". In 1948 he produced a drawing of Churchill. In 1950 another painting of Churchill by Cooper was unveiled at the Junior Carlton Club, by Field Marshal Viscount Alanbrooke, in the presence of Lord Portal, Lord Cunningham, Lord Ismay, Anthony Eden and Randolph Churchill. The painting showed "Mr Churchill sitting in evening dress with decorations and holding a cigar before the model of a sailing ship". That painting is now at the Carlton Club at 69 St James Street, London. In 1955 he painted Sir Winston Churchill seated in the garden at Chartwell "in the English tradition of Reynolds and Zoffany". It was hung in the library at Lloyd's of London, and then in the Lloyd's building at 51 Lime Street, London. In early January 1965 Cooper completed "the last portrait of Churchill"; that is, the last portrait that Churchill sat for. He said, "I used tempera. Churchill insisted on seeing every stroke painted. We had to fix up a mirror so he could watch me working". The painting was completed three days before Churchill had his final stroke. That 1965 portrait now hangs in the Cadbury Schweppes building at 25 Berkeley Square, London.

=== Scenes and landscapes ===
==== Paintings for newspapers and magazines ====
In 1935, Cooper painted the scene inside Westminster Hall, at the Silver Jubilee of George V; it was "specially drawn for The Sphere" newspaper, and was printed as a double-page spread. In the same month he executed two pictures for the Illustrated Sporting and Dramatic News (ISDN) titled The Morning of Derby Day showing "gypsies resting on the grass after putting the finishing touches to their booths", and An Alfresco Breakfast showing "gypsies taking their morning meal in the open on the day of the great race". In 1936 he painted An Ascot Finish for a two-page spread in ISDN. In 1938 he produced a picture of Sport and Duty: Ascot 1937 for ISDN, which printed half of it.

== Exhibitions ==
=== Royal Academy of Art Summer Exhibition ===
Cooper exhibited at the Royal Academy Summer Exhibition on at least 22 occasions, between 1911 and 1972. Some versions record or suggest 40 occasions. His first accepted painting, executed while still a student, was The Pardon, an oil painting (1911). Cooper's 1921 submission to the RA was London From an Airship, "a notable feature" of the exhibition. In 1925, he exhibited Le Rêve, "an extremely thin nude figure ... shows considerable technical accomplishment". In 1930 Cooper contributed a portrait of the actress Miss Norah Baring in dramatic pose. In 1933, he exhibited two oil paintings: Miss Jessica Tandy as Manuela in "Children in Uniform", which "won immediate success", and A Dorset Beach. The Tandy portrait was reproduced in various newspapers, and Cooper was photographed at his easel, in his studio with Tandy. In 1937, Cooper's contribution was a portrait, Marquess of Carisbrooke, "a resplendent figure in robes". In 1944 he exhibited his "massive" Derby Day, and his Dressing Table, "a lovely and attractive portrait". Cooper's 1950 contribution was The Dancer, a head-and-shoulders profile portrait in oils of the sitter in a balletic pose but wearing a jumper. In 1972 he contributed his last two paintings to the exhibition: the oil painting Dorset Beach again, and a watercolour The Life Class.

In April 1934 at the Royal Academy Summer Exhibition Cooper exhibited his Derby Day Seventy-Seven Years After Frith painting, which was a tribute to the earlier work, William Powell Frith's Derby Day. In Cooper's painting, two bookies' stands are given the names of two of his artist friends, Philip Connard and Adrian Scott Stokes: a "leg pull" which amused other artists. Cooper said, "Both are friends of mine, and I thought it would be rather a lark to put their names on the canvas. Now the other members of the club are having a great time at their expense". His portrait of Winston Churchill, later named Profile for Victory, was hung in the Royal Academy Summer Exhibition of 1943; the Tatler said that it was the "first profile portrait to be exhibited of the Prime Minister".

=== Other exhibition venues ===
Cooper exhibited at the Royal College of Art, and he "received an hon. mention at the Paris Salon 1924". In 1934 he exhibited a painting of three nudes to a show at Leger's Galleries called The Nude in Contemporary British Art. At the United Artists' exhibition at the Royal Academy galleries at Burlington House, 1940, Cooper showed The Model and the Mirror, featuring a female nude with 1940s hairstyle in classical pose with a mirror. In 1942 an exhibition dedicated to Cooper was held in the Wolsey Suite of Bentalls department store at Kingston upon Thames. In 1953, Cooper showed his watercolour scene, Palace Pier, Brighton, at the RW3 Galleries in Conduit Street, London. For the Royal Society of British Artists summer exhibition of 1953, Cooper contributed a painting titled Summer, showing a blonde female nude standing by a river. In 1955 an ad hoc exhibition at the Six Bells pub, Chelsea, included a work by Cooper. In 1964 he exhibited at the Royal Society of Portrait Painters exhibition at 195 Piccadilly. In 1973, when Cooper was nearly 90 years old, some of his First World War paintings of aircraft and views from them, including his Over the Lines, were exhibited at the Parkin Gallery in Belgravia, London. In 1974, shortly after Cooper died, a memorial display of twelve of his "striking canvases" was exhibited at Chelsea Art Society's 28th show at the Chenil Galleries in Chelsea. Cooper had been president of the Society for "many years", and his wife Irene became president after him. Cooper also exhibited at the Walker Art Gallery, Liverpool, The Royal Institute of Oil Painters (ROI), the Royal Institute of Painters in Water Colours, the Manchester Art Gallery, and the Royal Society of Arts.

== Collections ==
- National Portrait Gallery, London: Sir Barnes Wallis (1942), John Moore-Brabazon, 1st Baron Brabazon of Tara (1958), Winston Churchill Collotype print (1942).
- Imperial War Museum (WM), London: Airship 9 (1918), Airship 23 (1918), Rigid 26 (1918), R.34 and R.29 in the Shed at East Fortune (1919), (Note: All airship paintings by Cooper at the Imperial War Museum are oil on canvas.) Surgeon Major Arthur Martin-Leake (1874–1953), VC, RAMC (1921). At the IWM Duxford there are seven of Cooper's "pictures from the air".
- Guildhall Art Gallery: Sir Gerald Dodson, Lord Mayor's Banquet in the Guildhall, London, 1963, Sir Rupert de la Bôre (1893–1978), Lord Mayor of London (1952), The Pool of London (1913),
- Parliamentary Art Collection: The Lying-in-State of Winston Churchill in Westminster Hall, 1965,
- Royal Air Force Museum: Marshal of the Royal Air Force Lord Portal (1893–1971) (c.1943), Battle of Britain pilot Group Captain Clair Grece, DFC, MA (Oxon) (1945), Sir Barnes Neville Wallis (1887–1979) (1964), Marshal of the Royal Air Force Lord Portal (1893–1971) (c.1945), R34, East Fortune, Scotland (1919), Right Honourable Lord Brabazon of Tara (1884–1964), President of St Andrews Golf Glub (1958).
- Hunterian Museum and Art Gallery: Frederic Wood Jones (1958), John Thomas Quekett (1815–1861) (1961) (copy after Elizabeth Walker), Charles Stewart (1840–1907) (1962), Sir Cuthbert Wallace (1867–1944) (copy after George Harcourt).
- Christ's Hospital: Sir Oliver Lodge, Sir Barnes Wallis, Sir Barnes Wallis (1887–1979) (1930), headmistress of Girl's [sic] School of Christ's Hospital 1921 Miss Norah Cicely Craig, HRH Henry Duke of Gloucester Receiving His Charge as President, 14 April 1937 (1937), Miss D. West, Reverend Richard Lee, Headmaster, president of BSB charity at Christ's Hospital 1938 Charles Wilfred Thompson (1950s), President of BSB Joseph James Brown (1937).
- Wolverhampton Art Gallery: First mayor of Bilston Herbert Beach (1933), Ascot, the Paddock (before 1945), Lady in Red Velvet (before 1937), Mayor of Bilston Walter Martin Hughes (1937), Mayor of Bilston T. R. Wood (1927), Cooper's maternal grandmother Mrs Robert Speed at the Age of 95 (1901), Bilston town clerk Joseph Lewis Arlidge (before 1930).
- University of Reading: Frances Evelyn (1861–1938), Countess of Warwick (1954) (copy after John Singer Sargent).
- National Horseracing Museum: Grey Manus in Stables (1938).
- National Gallery of British Sports and Pastimes (owned by Walter Victor Hutchinson): The painting Derby Day, Epsom, 1933, also known as Derby Day Seventy-Seven Years After Frith (1933), was in this collection as of 1950.
- Cranfield University collection: London From an Airship (1919).
- Minneapolis Institute of Art: Winston Churchill (1942).
- Other collections: "Several of Mr, Cooper's pictures have been bought by public bodies, including the Governments of Canada, South Africa, and India".

== Institutions ==
For many years, Cooper was president of Chelsea Art Society. He was elected RBA in 1914, ARBA in 1921, and after another two years was a full member. He was at one time president of Brighton Art Club. He possibly belonged to the Society of Aviation Artists (now Guild of Aviation Artists), which was founded in 1954. Cooper and his son were members of the Carlton Club.

== Reviews ==
- In 1927 Cooper's contribution to the Royal Academy Summer Exhibition, titled Venus and Cupid, was reproduced in colour in The Sphere. The newspaper described it as, "a curiously modern treatment of the Cytherean".The Sphere, 6 August 1927. (Note: In Cooper's Venus and Cupid, a naked mother with Victorian hairstyle walks through a crocus field with her naked child. There is no hint of a traditional treatment of this mythological subject apart from the child's abundant, blond, Greek curls.)
- For the 1929 Royal Academy Summer Exhibition, Cooper contributed The Judgment of Paris, " a singularly pleasing treatment of a conventional if not hackneyed theme by an artist whose aviation pictures made a great name for him".The Sphere, 11 May 1929.
- In 1933, three of his portraits from his one-man show at the Leger Galleries, Bond Street, London, were reproduced in The Sphere. They were, There it Goes, Ann Todd in The Water Gypsies and The Sketcher on the Cliff. The newspaper captioned them as follows: "Three of the outstanding canvases at this distinguished artist's one-man show at the Leger Galleries, Old Bond Street, an exhibition in which his great talent is seen at its versatile best. All these 1932 pictures show a remarkable sense of action and atmosphere".The Sphere, 7 January 1933.
- For The Sphere newspaper in 1935, Cooper produced a painting of a stretch of the Thames: The King's Capital, from Westiminster to St Paul's. The picture's caption demonstrates the amount of detail typically included by Cooper, and it also captures a 1930s glimpse of London, where the urban landscape is constantly changing.

"This reach of the Thames is one of the finest prospects in London, and one that, owing to extensive building development, has changed considerably during the post-war years. No artist is better qualified to convey such a scene to canvas than Mr A. Egerton Cooper, and this reproduction from a recently-completed painting by him does full justice to a subject which demands the exercise of skill of a very high order. Mr Cooper established his easel at the top of the tower of the new building of Messrs. W. H. Smith and Son on the Albert Embankment, (Note: Bridge House on the Albert Embankment, London, known as the W.H. Smith building, was an Art Deco building with tower. It was built in 1935 and demolished in 1978.) and every afternoon for nine days climbed to the summit with his painting paraphernalia up four almost perpendicular iron ladders. Fortunately he enlisted the sympathy of the resident engineer, and the canvas itself was hauled up by a rope; otherwise the artist might never have been able to accomplish his task. Mr Cooper was also fortunate with regard to the weather which, for March, was unusually fine and clear. Even so, the horizon played hide and seek in remarkable fashion, and St Paul's, which, because of the bend in the river, appears to have moved over to the Surrey side, was visible only twice during the whole time he was at work.

"On the left of the new Lambeth Bridge can be seen a section of the imposing block of office buildings that has done so much to improve the Millbank district, and on the right of the bridge is Lambeth Palace, for 600 years the residence of the Archbishops of Canterbury. The massive red-brick entrance gateway to the palace, which is known as Morton's Tower, was erected in 1490 by Cardinal Morton – the adviser of Henry VII, who achieved such notoriety with his device for extracting extortionate taxes from rich and poor. On the right is the gateway of the parish church of St Mary, which although rebuilt in 1851, still retains its beautiful fifteenth-century tower. Behind these buildings is St Thomas' Hospital while, facing it on the other side of the river and, dominating the whole scene, are the Houses of Parliament and Westminster Abbey – those stately piles that epitomise the dignity and grace of London's architecture. Beyond, almost on the skyline, are some of the modern concrete edifices that of recent years have risen between Charing Cross and old Waterloo Bridge".The Sphere, 11 May 1935.

- In 1936, Cooper submitted his Paddock at the Pony Races – A Summer Meeting at Northolt Park, to the Royal Academy Summer Exhibition. It was reproduced in The Sphere, which captioned it: "The gay colours of the jockeys and the impression of bright sunshine give the picture a pleasing air of gaiety and vitality. Mr Cooper's work is well known to readers of The Sphere".The Sphere, 2 May 1936. The same picture was also reproduced as a two-page spread, under the title, Get Up Please! The Paddock at Northolt Park, in the Illustrated Sporting and Dramatic News, which said, "Mr Egerton Cooper's masterly studies of Epsom and other courses are as well known as his portraits, and his exhibitions at the Leger Gallery are always well patronised".Illustrated Sporting and Dramatic News, 15 May 1936.
- In 1942, Cooper exhibited his portrait The Australian at the Royal Academy United Artists Exhibition at Worthing's Art Gallery. The West Sussex Gazette said it was a "noble study ... by A. Egerton Cooper, virile in both composition and colouring".West Sussex Gazette, 1 October 1942.
- In 1943, The Scotsman included the following in an article about the Royal Academy Summer Exhibition of that year: "Portrait of the Prime Minister. It is difficult not to call Mr Egerton Cooper's portrait of the Prime Minister the picture of the year. The man of the hour seems to claim that distinction almost automatically; but looked at dispassionately it is merely one of a number of excellent portraits. Mr Churchill is seen in profile possibly because the artist thought of a good title: Profile for Victory. We see a man of great determination, conscious of a great task still to he performed, and ready to carry it through to the end. The expression is not especially grim. It is interesting to compare this portrait with the head in bronze of Mr Churchill by Sir W. Reid Dick, which is among the best exhibits in the Sculpture Gallery".The Scotsman, 1 May 1943.
- "Sporting canvas by Mr A. Egerton Cooper, in the exhibition of his works in the Grafton Street Galleries of Messrs Ellis and Smith. The number of well-known turf personalities identified on this painting give added interest to its wealth of colour and detail. Mr Cooper is a portrait painter of distinction, and his brilliant profile of the Rt. Hon. Mr. Winston Churchill, which attracted a great deal of attention at the Royal Academy of 1943 has been loaned to this show. This versatile artist, equally expert in the handling of flower studies as open-air subjects of a sporting flavour, has a number of such works both in oils and water-colour on view. The exhibitions of Messrs. Ellis and Smith in the past have been mainly devoted to the paintings by the old masters, and this changeover to contemporary work is for the special benefit of the South London Hospital for Women and Children. This hospital has set out to raise a sum of £100,000 (equivalent to £3,731,616 in 2025) in the course of the next seven years. Mr Egerton Cooper has donated a framed canvas for sale to the highest tender, to be painted with a subject of the purchaser's choice". Illustrated Sporting and Dramatic News, 22 June 1945. (Note: Cooper was photographed at that exhibition, with his portrait of Churchill).

== Cooper in popular culture ==
Some scenes in the film, The Dam Busters, were shot in 1954 in the house of Cooper's friend Barnes Wallis. Pictures by Cooper can be seen hanging in the rooms.
