= Afgar =

- Music: Charles Cuvillier
- Lyrics: Douglas Furber
- Book: Fred Thompson
- Productions: 1919 West End; 1920 Broadway

Afgar, or the Andalusian Leisure is a musical with lyrics by Douglas Furber, music by Charles Cuvillier and a book by Fred Thompson and Worton David. It is based on Cuvillier's 1909 French operetta of the same name, with words by André Barde and Michel Carré.

The original West End production opened at the London Pavilion on 17 September 1919 and ran for 300 performances over a period of three years under the management of Charles B. Cochran. It featured Marie Burke, Alice Delysia, Strafford Moss, John Humphries, Lupino Lane, Harry Welchman and Leon Morton, and its cast recording was the first original cast recording of a musical at the Pavilion. The costumes were designed by the French fashion designer Paul Poiret.

The Broadway production, directed by Frank Collins, opened on 8 November 1920 at the Central Theatre and ran for 168 performances. It starred Irving Beebee as Don Juan, Jr. and Delysia as Zaydee.

== Synopsis ==
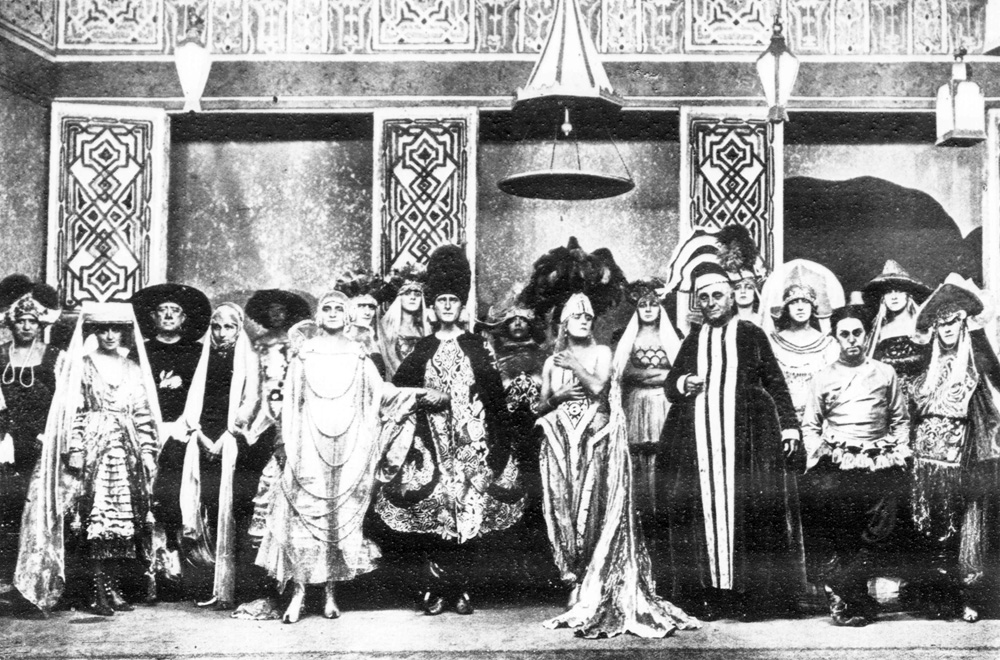
Scene from London production, 1919

Setting: Courtyard of the Palace of the Moor, Afgar; The Harem of the Palace; unknown country in an unknown time long ago, most likely in the Maghreb (Northern Africa) or the Iberian Peninsula (Spain or Portugal)

Don Juan, Jr. has been imprisoned within sight of a Moorish harem to punish him for being too flirtatious. The favorite harem girl, Zaydee, who likes the Don, organizes a strike of the harem girls, demanding his release and one husband for each girl. The strike succeeds, and all ends happily.

== Song list ==
Act I

- Give the Devil His Due – Don Juan, Jr.
- Rose of Seville – Isilda
- Live for Love – Zaydee
- Man from Mexico – Coucourli
- Caresses – Zaydee
- Why Don't You? (lyrics by Joseph McCarthy, music by Harry Tierney) – Zaydee

Act II

- United We Stand – Coucourli, Houssain and Chorus
- We're the Gentlemen of the Harem – Coucourli, Lord Afgar, Don Juan, Jr. and Chorus
- Sunshine Valley – Isilda
- Where Art Thou, Romeo? (lyrics by McCarthy; music by Tierney) – Zaydee
- Garden of Make Believe – Zaydee
- I Hate the Lovely Women (lyrics by McCarthy; music by Tierney) – Coucourli
- Ceremony of Veils – Zaydee, Isilda, Houssain and Chorus
- 'Neath Thy Casement – Don Juan, Jr.
