= The Lilac Domino =

Operetta by Charles Cuvillier

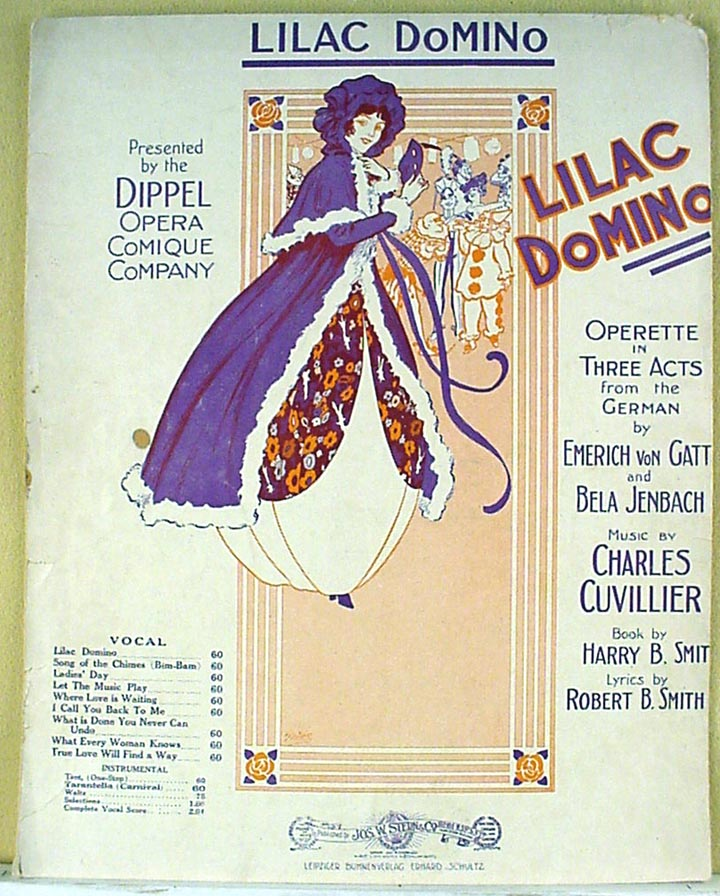
Sheet music cover

Der lila Domino (The Lilac Domino) is an operetta in three acts composed by Charles Cuvillier. The original German libretto is by Emmerich von Gatti and Bela Jenbach, about a gambling count who falls in love at a masquerade ball with a noblewoman wearing a lilac domino mask.

The operetta achieved far greater popularity in Britain and America than it did in Germany or France. Although The Lilac Domino became Cuvillier's greatest international hit, he won success in his native Paris with the operetta La reine s'amuse (1912; The Naughty Princess in London, 1920). He was popular in Germany before the First World War, and Der lila Domino was the first of two operettas that he wrote for German theatres.

== Performance history ==
Der lila Domino was first performed in Leipzig, Germany, on February 3, 1912, where it was a failure. Although produced with success in the U.S. (1914) and outstanding success in the UK (1918), the work was not seen in France until 1947, when a production was mounted at Mulhouse, with a cast including Willy Clément.

== English adaptations ==
=== Broadway version ===
Entitled The Lilac Domino, with an English libretto by Harry B. Smith, lyrics by Robert B. Smith, and additional songs by Howard Carr and Donovan Parsons, it opened on Broadway at the 44th Street Theatre on October 28, 1914, produced by Andreas Dippel. It received favourable notices and ran for 109 performances, starring Eleanor Painter and the English baritone Wilfrid Douthitt, followed by a North American tour. In the U.S. and UK versions, the setting was changed from Nice, France to Palm Beach, Florida.

==== Broadway cast, 1914 ====
- Vicomte de Brissac – George Curzon
- Georgine – Eleanor Painter
- Elledon – James Harrod
- Leonie D'Andorcet – René Detling
- Count André de St. Amand – Wilfrid Douthitt
- Prosper – John E. Hazzard
- Casimir – Robert O'Connor
- Baroness de Villiers – Jeanne Maubourg
- Istvan – Harry Herrosen

=== London version ===
Clara Butterworth, star of the 1918 London production

A new version was presented in London, with revised dialogue by S. J. Adair Fitzgerald, opening at the Empire Theatre on February 21, 1918, and running there until September 27, 1919. After a brief break, the production transferred to the Palace Theatre in October 1919. The piece ran for a total of 747 performances, closing on December 13, 1919, an extraordinarily long run at that time. The London cast starred Clara Butterworth and Jamieson Dodds. It became the third of London's great World War I hits after Chu Chin Chow (1916) and The Maid of the Mountains (1917). Some of its success in London was due to interpolated numbers by the Empire Theatre's musical director, Howard Carr, a nephew of the composer Howard Talbot. One newspaper review commented, "The music throughout is beautiful and even if the whole company were to dispense with costumes and sit in a ring like Christy Minstrels, the Lilac Domino would be a success". To which the humorous magazine Punch responded, "We can well believe it."

==== London cast, 1918 ====
- Cornelius Cleveden – R. Stuart Pigott
- Leonie Forde – Josephine Earle
- Elliston Deyn – Vincent Sullivan
- Prosper Woodhouse – Frank Lalor
- Norman J. Calmain – Edwin Wilson
- The Hon. Aubrey D'Aubigny – Jamieson Dodds
- Carabana – Dallas Anderson
- Georgine – Clara Butterworth
- Baroness de Villiers – Andrée Corday

Pigott, who played the role of the heroine's millionaire father, died suddenly in his dressing room, during the run, having not missed a single performance of the first 565.

The Lilac Domino remained in the British musical theatre repertoire until after World War II, also touring in Britain, Australia and elsewhere. Jamieson Doods, from the London cast, led the first Australian tour in 1920. Notable revivals included a 1944 production at His Majesty's Theatre in London starring Pat Taylor as Georgine, with a cast including Leo Franklyn, Bernard Clifton, Graham Payn and Elizabeth French. In 1953 a revised book was prepared by H. F. Maltby, which proved popular with amateur groups and removed the American elements of the original English version, restoring the setting to France.

=== Film adaptation ===
A film version, The Lilac Domino, was released in the UK in 1937 and in the U.S. in 1940, starring Michael Bartlett as Count Anatole and June Knight as Shari, the Lilac Domino. The setting was changed to Budapest.

== Synopsis ==
At Hotel Parnasse in Nice, during Carnival, at a masquerade ball, everyone is amazed by news that the wealthy old Lyons silk merchant Gaston Le Sage has found a new young bride, a widow named Leonie Lemmonnier. However, Leonie is more interested in Gaston's shy young step-nephew, Paul, who has been promised to Gaston's 18-year-old daughter Georgine. Georgine arrives masked and identified only as the "Lilac Domino". Meanwhile, three young men have lost heavily at cards. They agree that one must seek a wealthy bride in order to repay their gambling debts. Count André de St. Armand is chosen by the roll of dice to do the marrying. Fortunately, he has already fallen in love with a girl in a lilac domino. However, Georgine learns of the dice game, believes that André is wooing her only for her money, and breaks things off with him even though she returns his love. A gypsy violinist helps to solve the complications and unite the lovers. All ends happily.

== Musical numbers (London version) ==
Act I

- 1. No Fools Like Old Fools – Company
- 2. We Girls Don't Like Them Shy – Léonie
- 3. Let the Gypsies Play – Jack
- 4. My Fate – Georgine
- 5. The Lilac Domino – Georgine
- 6. Finale Act I: This Seems to Me a Tricky Business – Drake, Bertie, Raymond, Jack

Act II

- 7. For Your Love I Am Waiting – Léonie
- 8. A Pretty Pair – Montague & Bertie
- 9. Hello! Lilac Domino! – Jack with Georgine
- 10. Bells of Bon Secour – Jack
- 11. Dancing, Dancing – Drake, Raymond, Jack, Georgine, Léonie, Gaston and Paul
- 12. What Has Gone – Georgine
- 13. Finale Act II: – Seek, Find, Love's Blind

Act III

- 14. Carnival Night
- 15. All Line Up in a Queue – Drake and Girls
- 16. Ah! Ah! Ah! / Tarantella – Girls
- 17. We Girls Don't Like Them Shy (Reprise) – Léonie
- 18. Carte de jour – Guests
- 19. Finale Act III: The Domino! The Lilac Domino! – Company
