= Walter Hutchinson =

Walter Hutchinson may refer to:

- Walter Hely-Hutchinson, Anglo-Irish diplomat and colonial administrator
- Walter Hutchinson (publisher), British publisher
