= Sentimental ballad =

Style of music

A sentimental ballad is an emotional style of music that often deals with romantic and intimate relationships, and to a lesser extent, loneliness, death, war, drug abuse, politics and religion, usually in a poignant but solemn manner. Ballads are generally melodic enough to capture the listener's attention.

Sentimental ballads are found in most music genres, such as pop, R&B, soul, country, folk, rock and electronic music. Usually slow in tempo, ballads tend to have a lush musical arrangement which emphasizes the song's melody and harmonies. Characteristically, ballads use acoustic instruments such as guitars, pianos, saxophones, and sometimes an orchestral set. Many modern mainstream ballads tend to feature synthesizers, drum machines and even, to some extent, a dance rhythm.

Sentimental ballads had their origins in the early Tin Pan Alley music industry of the later 19th century. Initially known as "tear-jerkers" or "drawing-room ballads", they were generally sentimental, narrative, strophic songs published separately or as part of an opera, descendants perhaps of broadside ballads. As new genres of music began to emerge in the early 20th century, their popularity faded, but the association with sentimentality led to the term ballad being used for a slow love song from the 1950s onwards.

== History ==
=== Early history ===
Sentimental ballads have their roots from medieval French chanson balladée or ballade, which were originally "danced songs". Ballads were particularly characteristic of the popular poetry and song of the British Isles from the later medieval period until the 19th century. They were widely used across Europe, and later in the Americas, Australia and North Africa. As a narrative song, their theme and function may originate from Scandinavian and Germanic traditions of storytelling. Musically they were influenced by the Minnesinger. The earliest example of a recognizable ballad in form in England is "Judas" in a 13th-century manuscript. A reference in William Langland's Piers Plowman indicates that ballads about Robin Hood were being sung from at least the late 14th century and the oldest detailed material is Wynkyn de Worde's collection of Robin Hood ballads printed about 1495.

=== 18th century – early 20th century ===
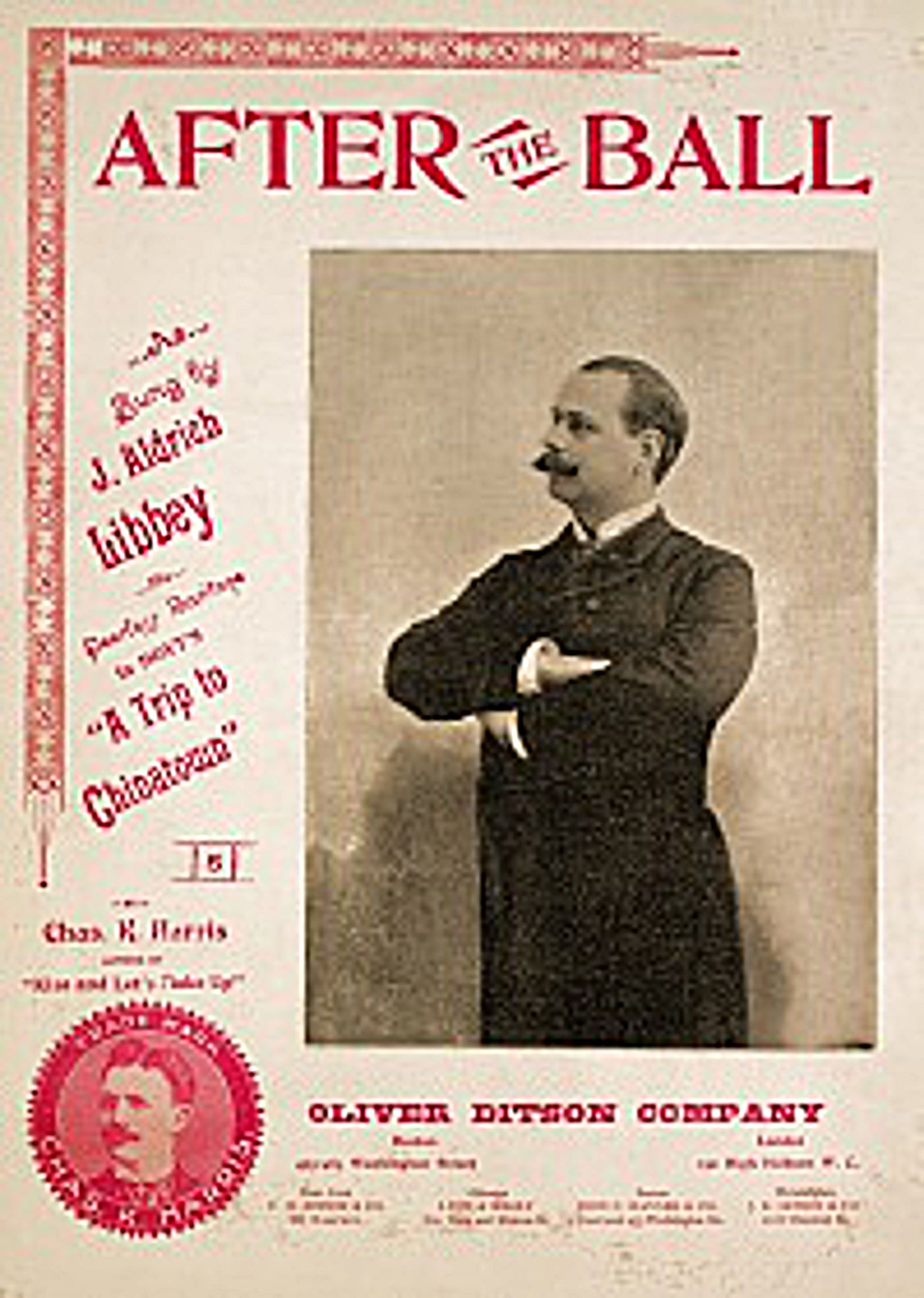
"After the Ball", a ballad by Charles K. Harris, was the most successful song of its era, selling over two million copies of sheet music.

Ballads at this time were originally composed in couplets with refrains in alternate lines. These refrains would have been sung by the dancers in time with the dance. In the 18th century, ballad operas developed as a form of English stage entertainment, partly in opposition to the Italian domination of the London operatic scene. In America a distinction is drawn between ballads that are versions of European, particularly British and Irish songs, and 'Native American ballads', developed without reference to earlier songs. A further development was the evolution of the blues ballad, which mixed the genre with Afro-American music.

In the late 19th century, Danish folklorist Svend Grundtvig and Harvard professor Francis James Child attempted to record and classify all the known ballads and variants in their chosen regions. Since Child died before writing a commentary on his work it is uncertain exactly how and why he differentiated the 305 ballads printed that would be published as The English and Scottish Popular Ballads. There have been many different and contradictory attempts to classify traditional ballads by theme, but commonly identified types are the religious, supernatural, tragic, love ballads, historic, legendary and humorous.

By the Victorian era, ballad had come to mean any sentimental popular song, especially so-called "royalty ballads", for which publishers would pay a star singer to promote new songs in exchange for a lump sum or a "royalty signature" on the sheet music and a small percentage of sales. Some of Stephen Foster's songs exemplify this genre and, in England, the ballads of Montague Phillips written for his wife Clara Butterworth in the early 1900s. By the 1920s, composers of Tin Pan Alley and Broadway used ballad to signify a slow, sentimental tune or love song, often written in a fairly standardized form. Jazz musicians sometimes broaden the term still further to embrace all slow-tempo pieces. Notable sentimental ballads of this period include, "Little Rosewood Casket" (1870), "After the Ball" (1892), and "Danny Boy" (1913).

=== 1950s–1960s ===
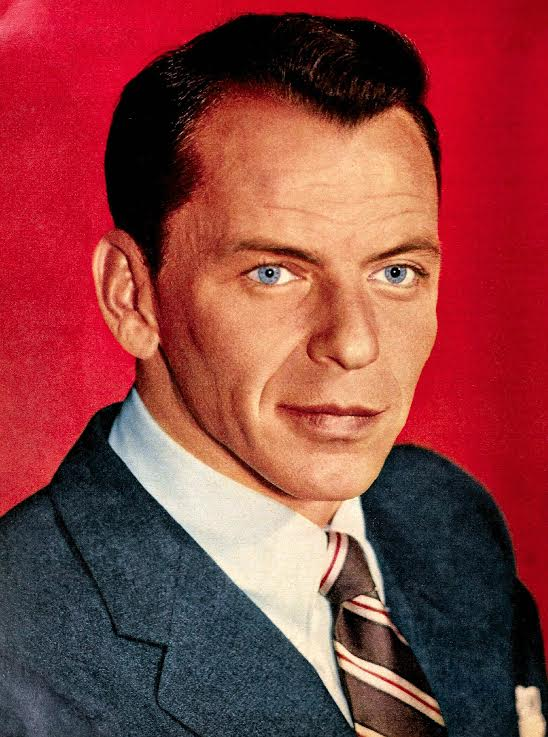
In 1962, Frank Sinatra released Sinatra and Strings, a set of standard ballads, which became one of the most critically acclaimed works of Sinatra's entire Reprise period.

Popular sentimental ballad vocalists in this era include Frank Sinatra, Ella Fitzgerald, Andy Williams, Johnny Mathis, Connie Francis and Perry Como. Their recordings were usually lush orchestral arrangements of current or recent rock and roll or pop hit songs. The most popular and enduring songs from this style of music are known as "pop standards" or (where relevant) "American standards". Many vocalists became involved in 1960s' vocal jazz and the rebirth of swing music, which was sometimes referred to as "easy listening" and was, in essence, a revival of popularity of the "sweet bands" that had been popular during the swing era, but with more emphasis on the vocalist and the sentimentality.

=== 1970s ===
Soft rock, a subgenre that mainly consists of ballads, was derived from folk rock in the late 1960s, using acoustic instruments and putting more emphasis on melody and harmonies. Major sentimental ballad artists of this decade included Barbra Streisand, Nana Mouskouri, Elton John, Engelbert Humperdinck, Carole King, Cat Stevens and James Taylor. By the early 1970s, softer ballad songs by the Carpenters, Anne Murray, John Denver and Barry Manilow began to be played more often on "Top 40" radio.

Some rock-oriented acts such as Queen and the Eagles also produced ballads.

When the word ballad appears in the title of a song, as for example in the Beatles' "The Ballad of John and Yoko" (1969) or Billy Joel's "The Ballad of Billy the Kid" (1974), the folk music sense is generally implied. The term ballad is also sometimes applied to strophic story-songs more generally, such as Don McLean's "American Pie" (1971).

=== 1980s–1990s ===
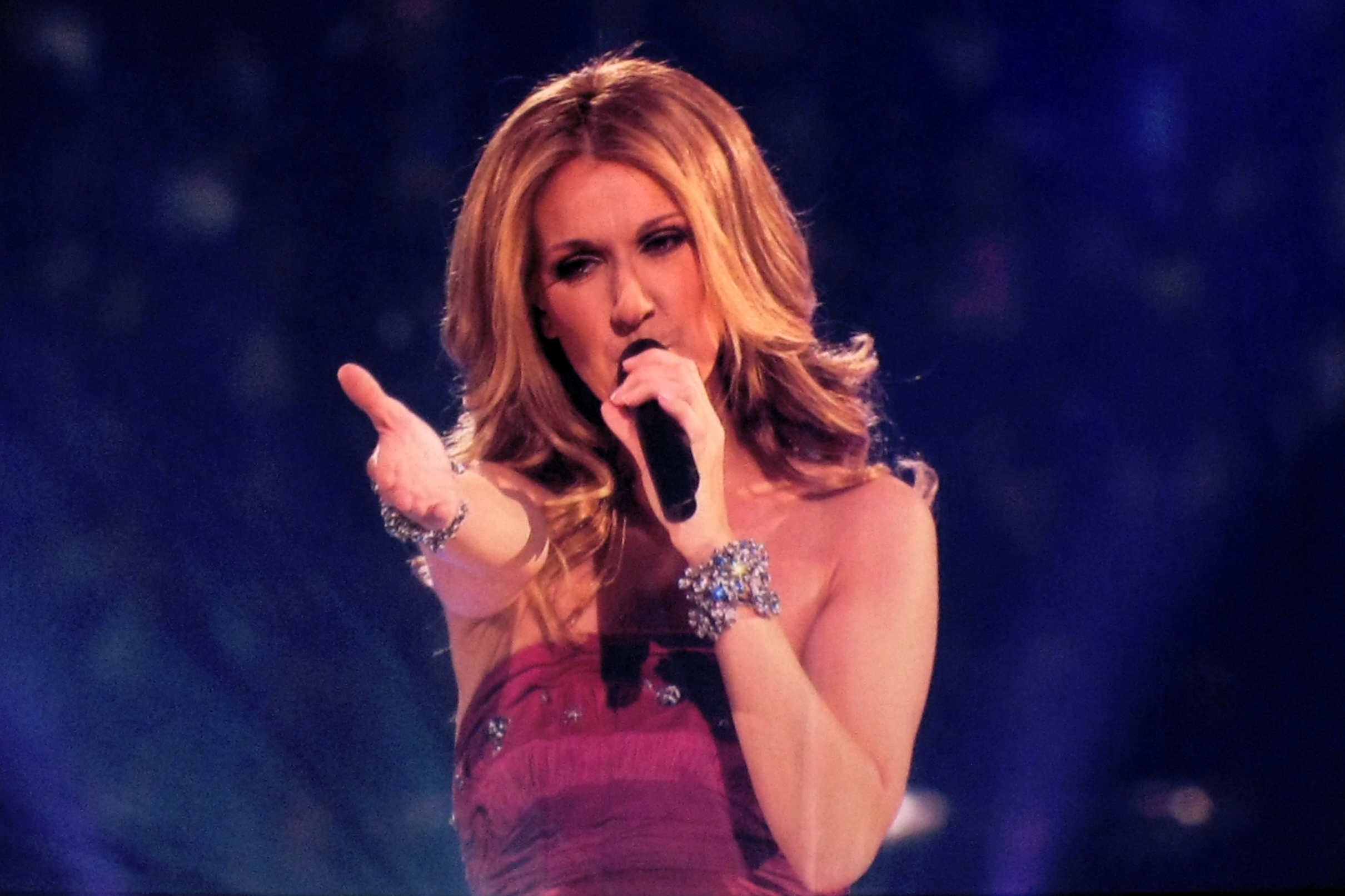
Celine Dion's albums were generally constructed on the basis of melodramatic soft rock ballads, with sprinklings of uptempo pop and rare forays into other genres.

Prominent artists who made sentimental ballads in the 1980s include Stevie Wonder, Lionel Richie, Peabo Bryson, Barry White, Luther Vandross and George Michael.

The 1990s include mainstream pop/R&B singers such as Boyz II Men, Celine Dion, Shania Twain, Whitney Houston and Mariah Carey.

Newer female singer-songwriters such as Sarah McLachlan, Natalie Merchant, Jewel, Melissa Etheridge and Sheryl Crow also broke through on the AC chart during this time owing to their ballad-sound.

=== 2000s ===
A popular trend in the early 2000s was remixing or re-recording dance music hits into acoustic ballads (for example, the "Candlelight Mix" versions of "Heaven" by DJ Sammy, "Listen to Your Heart" by DHT, and "Everytime We Touch" by Cascada).

=== 2010s ===
In the 2010s, indie musicians like Imagine Dragons, Mumford & Sons, Of Monsters and Men, the Lumineers and Ed Sheeran had indie songs that crossed over to the adult contemporary charts, due to their ballad-heavy sound.

== Genres ==
=== Jazz and traditional pop ===
Most pop standard and jazz ballads are built from a single, introductory verse, usually around 16 bars in length, and they end on the dominant – the chorus or refrain, usually 16 or 32 bars long and in AABA form (though other forms, such as ABAC, are not uncommon). In AABA forms, the B section is usually referred to as the bridge; often a brief coda, sometimes based on material from the bridge, is added, as in "Over the Rainbow".

=== Pop and R&B ballads ===
The most common use of the term "ballad" in modern pop and R&B music is for an emotional song about romance, breakup and/or longing. The singer would usually lament an unrequited or lost love, either where one party is oblivious to the existence of the other, where one party has moved on, or where a romantic affair has affected the relationship.

=== Power ballads ===
Power ballad
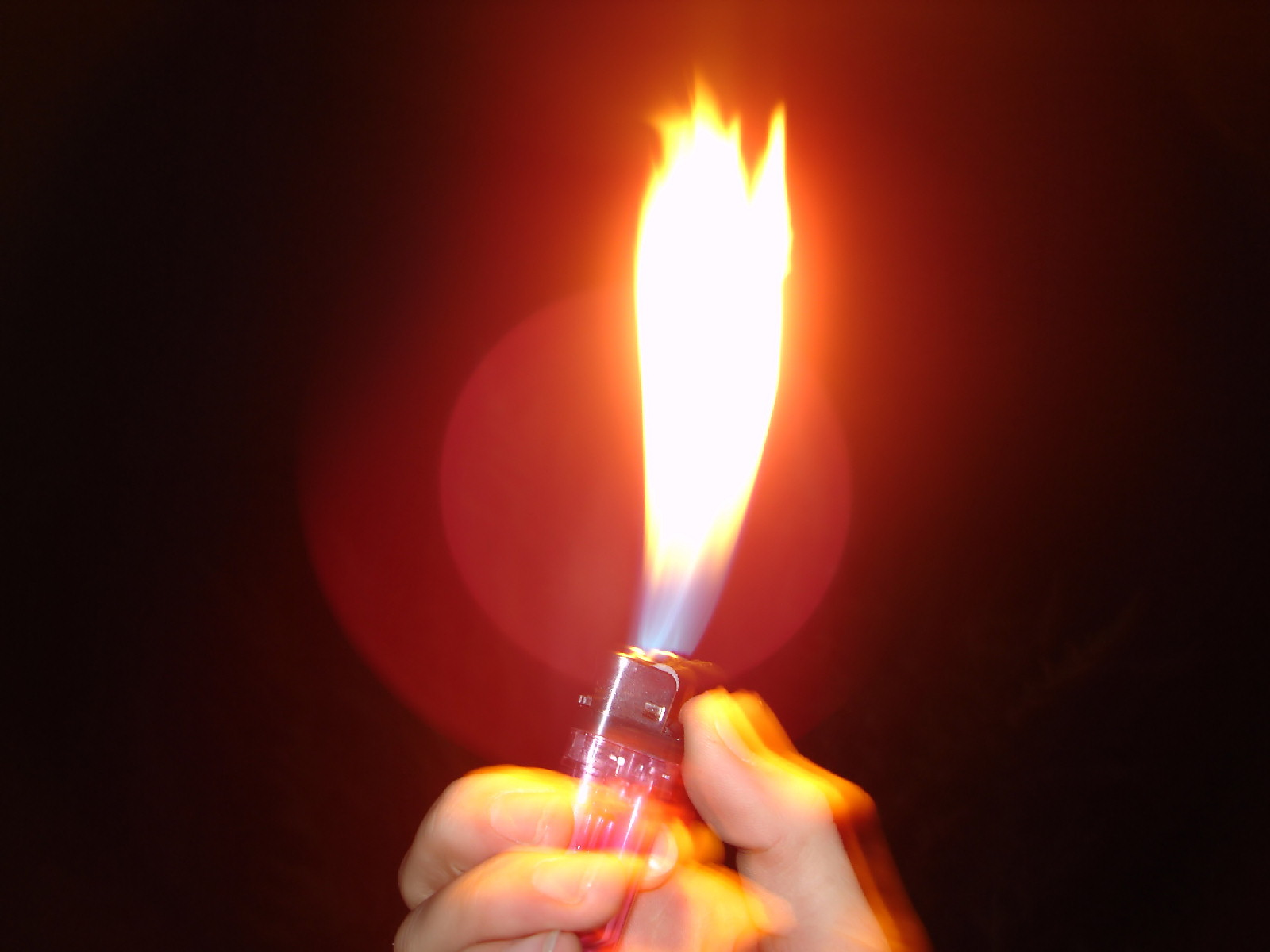
- To emphasize the emotional aspect of a power ballad, crowds customarily hold up lighters adjusted to produce a large flame (or, as a more recent alternative, a turned-on smartphone screen or flashlight function).
- Stylistic origins: Arena rock; pop rock; hard rock; heavy metal; soft rock
- Cultural origins: Early 1970s

Other topics
- Soft rock; glam metal; power pop; post-grunge; adult contemporary

Simon Frith, the British sociomusicologist and former rock critic, identifies the origins of the power ballad in the emotional singing of soul artists, particularly Ray Charles, and the adaptation of this style by performers such as Eric Burdon, Tom Jones, and Joe Cocker to produce slow-tempo songs often building to a loud and emotive chorus backed by drums, electric guitars, and sometimes choirs. According to Charles Aaron, power ballads came into existence in the early 1970s, when rock stars attempted to convey profound messages to audiences while retaining their "macho rocker" mystique. The hard rock power ballad typically expresses love or heartache through its lyrics, shifting into wordless intensity and emotional transcendence with heavy drumming and a distorted electric guitar solo representing the "power" in the power ballad.

Aaron argues that the hard rock power ballad broke into the mainstream of American consciousness in 1976 as FM radio gave a new lease of life to earlier impassioned songs such as Badfinger's "Without You", Led Zeppelin's "Stairway to Heaven" and Aerosmith's "Dream On". The Carpenters' 1972 single "Goodbye to Love" has also been identified as a prototype of the power ballad, driven by the hard rock guitar sound of Tony Peluso. British heavy metal band Judas Priest wrote many power ballads, starting with "Dreamer Deceiver" and "Beyond the Realms of Death".

American rock band Styx has been credited with releasing the first true power ballad, the song "Lady", in 1973. Its writer, Dennis DeYoung is called the "father of the power ballad". In 1976 the heavy metal band Kiss shocked their fans with the release of the ballad "Beth", (essentially a solo track by Peter Criss, produced by Bob Ezrin on which no other members of the band played).

In the 1980s, bands such as Foreigner, Journey, and REO Speedwagon contributed to the power ballad becoming a staple of hard rock performers who wanted to gain more radio airplay and satisfy their female audience members with a slower, more emotional love song. Mötley Crüe was one of the bands showcasing this style, with songs such as "Home Sweet Home" and "You're All I Need". Nearly every hard rock and glam metal band wrote at least one power ballad for each album, and record labels often released these as the album's second single. In 2008, Classic Rock critic Paul Elliott declared Journey's 1983 song "Faithfully" to be "the greatest power ballad of all time".

When grunge appeared as a counterpoint to the excesses of 1980s hard rock and glam metal, one of the distinctions of the grunge style was the absence of power ballads; however, some songs from this era such as "Rooster" by Alice in Chains (1992), which Ned Raggett described as the band's "own particular approach" to the style, and "Black Hole Sun" by Soundgarden (1994) have been described using this term, and songs in its subgenre post-grunge included ballads.

=== Latin ballad ===
Luis Miguel in Mexico City

Latin ballad refers to the ballad derived from bolero that originated in the early-1960s in Latin America and Spain.

One of the most well-known Latin ballad singers of the 1970s and 1980s was José José. Known as "El Principe de La Cancion" (The Prince of the Song), he sold over 40 million albums in his career and became a huge influence to later ballad singers such as Cristian Castro, Alejandro Fernández, Nelson Ned, Manuel Mijares and Lupita D'Alessio.

== See also ==
- Threnody
- Torch song
- List of Irish ballads
- List of rock ballads
- Slow dance
