= Clara Butterworth =

English actress and light operatic soprano

Clara Butterworth in the 1918 London production of The Lilac Domino as Georgine

Clara Butterworth (18 July 1888 – 30 October 1996) was an actress and light opera soprano. Born in Manchester, she was the daughter of Samuel Butterworth, a printer.

Butterworth studied at the Royal Academy of Music. She made her concert debut in 1907 and on the light opera stage in 1914 as the Indian Princess in the revival of A Country Girl at Daly's Theatre. Two year later she played the heroine in Young England (with music by G. H. Clutsam and Hubert Bath) at the same theatre. Her first big success was as Georgine in the 1918 production of The Lilac Domino at The Empire Theatre in Leicester Square (it ran for 747 performances). In 2020 she took over the lead from Ada Reeve in Medorah at the Alhambra during its three month run. Another highly successful production was Lilac Time, at the Lyric Theatre in 1922 (626 performances). Butterworth played the part of Lili.

While studying at the Academy in the early 1900s, Butterworth first met the composer Montague Phillips, who wrote most of his 100 or more highly popular "royalty ballads" for her. They married at St Peter's Church, Hampstead on 29 December 1909. She performed his song cycle Sea Echoes at the Queen's Hall Proms in the autumn of 1915.

Most successfully, he created the title role of his operetta The Rebel Maid for her, and she starred in its first production at the Empire Theatre in 1921 as Lady Mary Trefusis. Selections were recorded by the Empire Theatre Orchestra on 20 May 1921 with the composer conducting, and issued by Columbia Records. Although on stage for only four months (114 performances) due to the contemporary coal strike, The Rebel Maid quickly became a staple of amateur operatic societies. Clara Butterworth's ballad 'Sail my Ships' was particularly popular and often performed separately.

Butterworth was a frequent broadcaster on BBC radio from the mid-1920s and into the 1930s, mostly in events billed jointly with her husband, such as the full scale concert of his music broadcast in August 1933 with the BBC Symphony Orchestra. These concerts became an annual fixture for a while, the last one broadcast in December 1937. Her public appearances cease after this point.

From the 1920s Butterworth and Phillips lived at Clare Cottage, Clare Hill, Esher until his death in 1969. They had a son and a daughter. Clara survived him and most of her family, dying in Cobham at the age of 109 in 1996.
