= Pas sur la bouche =

The title Pas sur la bouche may refer to:

- Pas sur la bouche, an operetta by André Barde and Maurice Yvain, first produced in 1925
- Pas sur la bouche (1931 film), a French film directed by Nicolas Evreinoff et Nicolas Rims
- Pas sur la bouche (2003 film), a French film directed by Alain Resnais (also known by its English title Not on the Lips).
