= Hutchinson Heinemann =

British book and magazine publisher

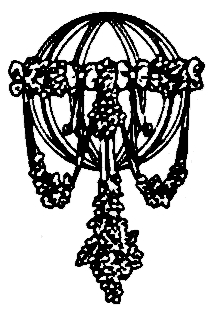
- Hutchinson & Co. logo
- Parent company: Penguin Random House
- Founded: 1887; 139 years ago
- Founder: George Hutchinson
- Country of origin: United Kingdom
- Headquarters location: London, England
- Publication types: Books
- Official website: www.penguin.co.uk/company/publishers/cornerstone/hutchinson-heinemann

Hutchinson Heinemann is a British publishing firm founded in 1887. It is currently an imprint which is ultimately owned by Bertelsmann, the German publishing conglomerate.

== History ==
Hutchinson Heinemann began as Hutchinson & Co. (Publishers) Ltd., an English book publisher, founded in London in 1887 by Sir George Hutchinson and later run by his son, Walter Hutchinson (1887–1950). Hutchinson's published books and magazines such as The Lady's Realm, Adventure-story Magazine, Hutchinson's Magazine and Woman.

In the 1920s, Walter Hutchinson published many of the "spook stories" of E. F. Benson in Hutchinson's Magazine and then in collections in a number of books. The company also first published Arthur Conan Doyle's Professor Challenger novels, five novels by mystery writer Harry Stephen Keeler, and short stories by Eden Phillpotts. In 1929, Walter Hutchinson stopped publishing magazines to concentrate on books. In the 1930s, Hutchinson published H. G. Wells's The Bulpington of Blup as well as the first English translations of Vladimir Nabokov's Camera Obscura (translated by Winifred Roy with Nabokov credited as Vladimir Nabokoff-Sirin) in 1936 and Despair (translated by Nabokov himself) under its John Long marque of paperbacks.

In 1947, the company launched the Hutchinson University Library book series.

Among notable, non-fiction books, in 1959, Hutchinson & Co. published the first English edition of Karl Popper's most famous work, The Logic of Scientific Discovery, first published as Logik der Forschung in 1934.

The company merged with Century Publishing in 1985 to form Century Hutchinson. The new company acquired the publishing firm Muller, Blond & White Ltd in 1987. Century Hutchinson was folded into the British Random House Group in 1989, briefly known as Random Century (1990–1992), Century became an imprint of Cornerstone Publishing, a publishing house of Penguin Random House UK, which is in turn a division of Penguin Random House, which itself, since 2013, was owned jointly by Bertelsmann and Pearson plc and since 2019, just by Bertelsmann. In 2021, Penguin Random House merged William Heinemann, Hutchinson and Windmill into Hutchinson Heinemann.

== Book series ==
- Chestnut Library
- Hutchinson's Booklover's Library
- Hutchinson Pocket Special
- Hutchinson's Pocket Guides
- Hutchinson's Pocket Library
- Hutchinson's Pocket Library: Non-Fiction
- Hutchinson's Popular Pocket Library
- Hutchinson Science Series
- Hutchinson University Library
- Radius Books

== See also ==
- Hutchinson Encyclopedia
