= Strafford Moss =

British tenor and actor (1868–1941)

Strafford Moss

Frederick Strafford Moss (1 November 1868 – 1941) was a British tenor and actor. He appeared in the Savoy operas of Gilbert and Sullivan from 1897 to 1913, mainly in touring companies of the D'Oyly Carte Opera Company, following which he had a career in musical theatre on the West End stage until 1931.

== Early years: joining D'Oyly Carte ==
Moss was the son of Ruhamah Moss and civil servant William Burrowes Moss.

He made his first appearance with one of the D'Oyly Carte Opera Company touring companies from August to December 1897, most likely in the chorus, before taking on the small roles of Leonard Meryll in The Yeomen of the Guard and Francesco in The Gondoliers. At the Savoy Theatre Moss sang with the chorus in The Beauty Stone from May to July 1898 and appeared in the leading tenor role of the Defendant in Trial by Jury in December 1898. On 17 November 1898 he married Edith Helen Woodington (1862–1899) at St. Paul's Church in Lambeth, London. At that time he registered his occupation as "chorister". With other D'Oyly Carte companies, he toured from July to September 1899 as Oswald in Haddon Hall and in October 1899 as Oswald and Leonard. From November 1899 to February 1900 Moss reprised the roles of the Defendant and Leonard, before touring as the Physician-in-Chief in The Rose of Persia.

In September 1901 Moss, then a widower, married a widow, Jane Minnie Shale (née Phillips, 1868–1951), at Holy Trinity Church in Clapham, London. Moss toured with D'Oyly Carte companies from July 1901 to May 1902 as Dr. Fiddle D.D. in The Emerald Isle. From 1903 to 1904 Moss played the leading tenor role of Hilarion in Princess Ida, the small role of First Yeoman in Yeomen, Francesco in The Gondoliers, the title character, Bob Berkeley, in the Cunningham Bridgeman and François Cellier curtain raiser Bob and the Defendant in Trial. He continued to play Hilarion, First Yeoman, Francesco and the Defendant until December 1906 and sang Luiz in The Gondoliers from July 1904 to January 1905.

== Principal tenor ==
Moss as Nanki-Poo in The Mikado (1907)

In 1905, the D'Oyly Carte company was performing only on tour. Moss was promoted to the leading roles of Nanki-Poo in The Mikado, Colonel Fairfax in Yeomen and Marco in The Gondoliers. From December 1906 to February 1907 he assumed more leading roles, Ralph Rackstraw in H.M.S. Pinafore, Frederic in The Pirates of Penzance, the Duke of Dunstable in Patience, Tolloller in Iolanthe and Cyril in Princess Ida, in addition to Nanki-Poo, Fairfax and Marco in The Gondoliers. In 1906 he toured South Africa with the D'Oyly Carte company. Moss appeared as Marco at the Savoy Theatre in the company's First London Repertory Season 1907 and from July 1907 he was again touring as principal tenor, sharing the role of Defendant and also playing Ralph, Frederic, the Duke, Tolloller, Cyril, Nanki-Poo, Fairfax and Marco. In April 1908 the Company returned to the Savoy Theatre for its Second London Repertory Season, opening with Moss as Nanki-Poo from April to May 1908. From July to October 1908 he appeared as Griffith David in another companion piece, A Welsh Sunset, and stood in as Nanki-Poo and Ralph several times in September and October that year.

When Rupert D'Oyly Carte revived the touring company in October 1908 Moss appeared as principal tenor, singing the Defendant, Ralph, Frederic, Duke, Tolloller, Cyril, Nanki-Poo, Fairfax and Marco. On the completion of the London season in March 1909, Moss rejoined the main company, but his roles were reduced to the Defendant, Frederic, Duke, Tolloller, Cyril and Fairfax. In the 1912 tour he played Major Murgatroyd in Patience, Fairfax in Yeomen and Frederic in Pirates. Moss left the D'Oyly Carte Opera Company in September 1913.

== Later career ==
Moss later appeared in the West End in operettas and musicals such as in Mr. Manhattan at the Prince of Wales Theatre (1916), the Chancellor in Arlette at the Shaftesbury Theatre (1917), As You Were at the London Pavilion with Hayden Coffin (1918), Violette at the Lyric Theatre (1918), Dansasch, Master of the Gates in Afgar at the London Pavilion (1919), and Babadagh in The Naughty Princess at the Adelphi Theatre (1920). He recorded two duets with George Grossmith Jr. from The Naughty Princess for Columbia in 1920. Moss was Mr. Bascombe in the musical Follow Through (1930) at the Victoria Palace Theatre. His last role in the West End was in December 1931 at the Adelphi Theatre as King Priam in Helen!, Max Reinhardt's adaptation of Offenbach's La belle Hélène, in a production starring Evelyn Laye. It had a libretto by A. P. Herbert and a revised score by Erich Korngold.

Moss died in London in 1941, aged 72.

== Sources ==
- Wearing, J. P., The London Stage 1900–1909: A Calendar of Productions, Performers, and Personnel, Rowman & Littlefield (2014), Google Books
- Wearing, J. P., The London Stage 1930–1939: A Calendar of Productions, Performers, and Personnel, Rowman & Littlefield (2014), Google Books
