= Charles Cuvillier =

French composer (1877–1955)

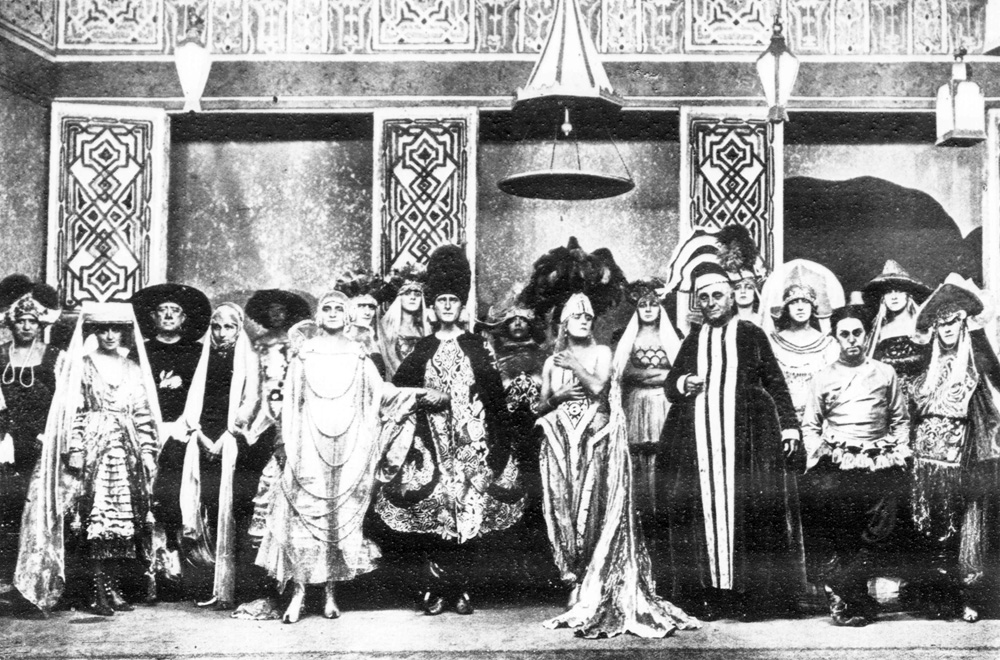
Scene from London production of Cuvillier's Afgar, 1919

Charles Cuvillier (24 April 1877 – 14 February 1955) was a French composer of operetta. He won his greatest successes with the operettas La reine s'amuse (1912, played as The Naughty Princess in London) and with The Lilac Domino, which became a hit in 1918 in London.

== Biography ==
Cuvillier was born in Paris, and studied at the Paris Conservatoire with Gabriel Fauré and Jules Massenet. He began writing for the Paris musical stage and had a success with Avant-hier matin (1905), a small scale work with piano accompaniment. Later stage works to achieve success in France and abroad included Son p'tit frère (1907), his first collaboration with André Barde, and La reine s'amuse (1912). The latter (also known as La reine joyeuse) featured Cuvillier's biggest hit, "Ah! la troublante volupté". Before the First World War he made a career in Germany as well as France. The second of his two works written for German theatres, Flora Bella, was playing in Munich and had its run immediately brought to a stop when war was declared. Cuvillier fought in the trenches against Germany during the war, and thereafter made his career in France and the U.K.

Cuvillier was popular in England after the First World War. Avant-hier matin played with success in London as Wild Geese, and La reine joyeuse ran for 280 performances as The Naughty Princess. His greatest international success was the operetta The Lilac Domino, originally Der lila Domino (Leipzig, 1912). The critic Andrew Lamb writes that Cuvillier composed "light, insinuating music, distinguished by typically French phrasing."

Cuvillier also composed film music, including Mon amant l'assassin (1931), Occupe-toi d'Amélie (1932) and Story of a Poor Young Man (1935).

Cuvillier died in Paris in 1955, at the age of 77.

== Stage works ==
- 1903: La Citoyenne Cotillon, comédie dramatique by Henri Cain and Ernest Daudet, incidental music by Cuvillier
- 1905: Avant-hier matin (libretto: Tristan Bernard), Paris, Théâtre des Capucines
- 1907: Le flirt de Colombine (Jaques Redelsperger), Nice
- 1907: Son p'tit frère (André Barde), Paris, Capucines; revised as Laïs, ou la courtisane amoureuse, 1929
- 1908: Les rendez-vous strasbourgeois (Romain Coolus), Paris, Comédie-Royale
- 1909: Afgar, ou Les loisirs andalous (Barde and Michel Carré, fils), Paris, Capucines
- 1910: La fausse ingénue, ou les Muscadines (Barde), Paris, Capucines
- 1912: Der lila Domino (Emmerich von Gatti and Bela Jenbach), Leipzig, Stadttheater
- 1912: Sapphô (Barde and Carré), Paris, Capucines
- 1912: La reine s'amuse (Barde), Marseille, Variétés; revised as La reine joyeuse, Paris, Olympia, 1918
- 1912: L'Initiatrice (Robert Dieudonné and Hugues Delorme), Paris, Mayol
- 1913: Flora Bella (Felix Dörmann), Munich, Staatstheater am Gärtnerplatz; French version (Barde): Florabella, Célestins, Lyon, 1921
- 1915: Judith courtisane, (Régis Gignoux), Paris, Théâtre Michel
- 1918: Mademoiselle Nom d'une pipe (Georges Duval, Paris, Palais Royal
- 1920: The Sunshine of the World (Gladys Unger after K.K. Ardashir), London, Empire
- 1920: Johnny Jones and his Sister Sue, (Harry M. Vernon), London, Alhambra
- 1922: Annabella (Maurice Magre), Paris, Théâtre Fémina
- 1922: Par amour (Magre), Paris, Paris, Femina
- 1922: Nonnette (Barde), Paris, Capucines
- 1924: Bob et moi (Barde, L. Meyrargue), Paris, Michel
- 1926: Qui êtes-vous? (H. Genty, Berr and Jouvault), Monte Carlo
- 1929: Laïs ou La Courtisane amoureuse (Barde) (see Son p'tit frère, 1907, above)
- 1929: Boulard et ses filles (Louis Verneuil, Saint-Granier, Jean le Seyeux), Paris, Théâtre Marigny
- 1935: Le Train de 8h47 (Georges Courteline, Lépold Marches, Barde), Paris, Palais Royale
