= The Naughty Princess =

King Michael and Prince Ladislas in Act I

The Naughty Princess is an opéra bouffe with music by Charles Cuvillier, book by J. Hastings Turner, and lyrics by Adrian Ross. The work, adapted from La reine joyeuse by Cuvillier and Andre Barde, depicts a princess with very modern ideas, who rebels against arranged marriage and court etiquette. It was first produced in London in 1920 and 1921.

== History ==
The piece, adapted from the 1912 opéra bouffe La reine joyeuse (also known as La reine s'amuse) by Cuvillier and André Barde, was presented under the management of George Grossmith, Jr. and Edward Laurillard at the Adelphi Theatre, London, on 7 October 1920, and ran until 28 May 1921, 280 performances. A production toured Australia in 1922, under the J.C. Williamson management.

== Cast ==
Sophia and Chiquette in Act II

- King Michael of Panoplia – W. H. Berry
- Princess Sophia – his daughter – Lily St. John
- Prince Ladislas – his nephew – George Grossmith, Jr.
- Prince Gospodar – Leon Morton
- Countess Kittisch – Lady in waiting to Sophia – Amy Augarde
- Hyppolyte Flaméche – a painter – Philip Simmons
- Chiquette – Flaméche's latest wife – Yvonne Arnaud
- King Michael's ministers

- Lascar Catargi – Frank Parfitt
- Nitchevo – Alfred Beers
- Phillippopoli – Leigh Ellis
- Babadagh – Strafford Moss
- Crebadat – Ralph Coram

- Salome – Heather Thatcher
- Seraphine – Silvia Leslie
- Messenger – E. Trimming Law
- Guests at the Bal des Quat'z' Arts – Miss Elaine, Miss Sabbage

== Synopsis ==
Sophia, Ladislas and his attempt at portraiture

King Michael of Panoplia is driven to distraction by the behaviour of his daughter, Princess Sophia. She refuses to consent to the marriage with Prince Gospodar that, for political reasons, the king earnestly desires for her. She announces her intention of leaving the court and becoming a painter. The king calculates that if she can be manoeuvred into a flirtation with an undesirable, Gospodar may then seem a better prospect. The king's nephew, Prince Ladislas, is recruited to help in this scheme. He has been away in Paris for ten years, studying hard at the Sorbonne. It is agreed that he will pose as the well-known painter Hippolyte Flaméche, and in that guise he is introduced to the princess. She is delighted, and invites the false Flaméche to paint her portrait. Unfortunately Ladislas is no painter and his picture is not a success. Nevertheless, Sophia insists that he should take her to Paris. With Ladislas and a lady-in-waiting, and all the royal jewels, Sophia departs for Paris. The king, attracted by the chance of revisiting the scenes of his own youth, also decides to go to Paris incognito.

Egyptian tableau in Act II

In Paris, they all converge at the famous festivities at the Bal des Quat'z' Arts, where the theme is "ancient Egypt", with spectacular costumes and tableaux. Ladislas meets an old flame, Chiquette, who has become the wife of the real Hippolyte Flaméche. Flamméche is much taken with Sophia, but Chiquette is concerned for Sophia's innocence and takes her under her protective wing. Ladislas has by now come to love Sophia, and for her own good gives a feigned display of drunkenness and violent protestations of love under the plea that this is the thoroughly Bohemian behaviour that she craves. King Michael is enjoying himself too much to pay any attention to an urgent message brought by a courier from his capital.

At Ladislas's studio in the rue du Diable, the revellers are gathered after leaving the bal. The messenger finally manages to get Michael to attend to his message. There has been a revolution in Panoplia, Michael is deposed, and Sophia has been proclaimed queen. Sophia learns that the Bohemian who kissed her so passionately at the bal is Prince Ladislas, and gladly accepts his proposal of marriage.

== Critical reception ==
The Observer praised Grossmith's subtlety of performance, but thought "Mr. Cuvillier's music will make the play go, Mr. Berry's humour will make the play go, Miss Lily St. John's clear voice, and her delightful embarrassment at the applause she gets, will make the play go – and the setting and the costumes were thought tremendously fine." The Times praised the production: "As a riot of fantastic colour it was one of the most exhilarating that we have seen on the London stage for a long time." Of the music, the paper commented, "The official label of The Naughty Princess is opéra bouffe. Now and again certainly Cuvillier's music seemed to justify the description. … The waltz song and its Egyptian splendours will carry it far."
