= Gerald Dodson =

His Honour Sir Gerald Dodson
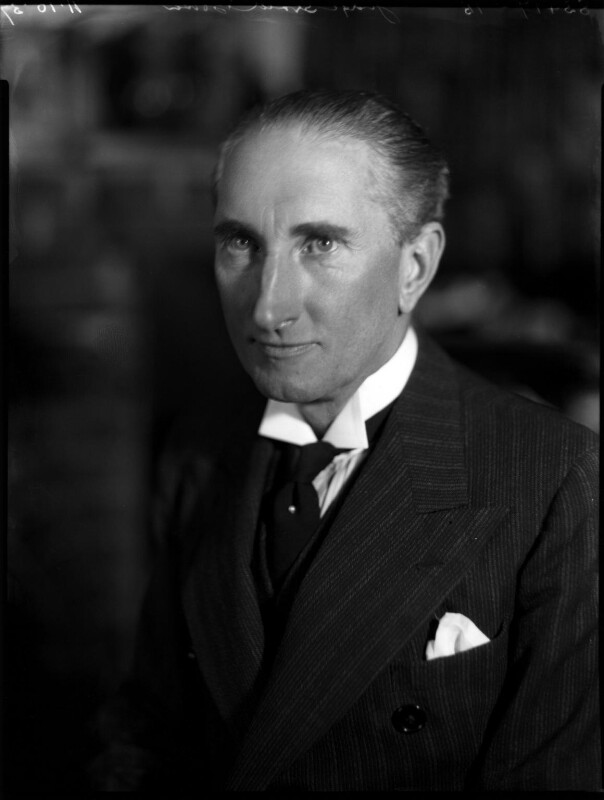
- Dodson in 1937

Recorder of London
- In office 1937–1959
- Preceded by: Sir Holman Gregory
- Succeeded by: Sir Anthony Hawke

Sir Gerald Dodson (28 August 1884 – 2 November 1966) was Recorder of London from 1937 to 1959, the longest holder of that office. He was also well-known to the public due to his authorship of the libretto of a popular operetta, The Rebel Maid, composed by Montague Phillips in 1921.

Dodson was the son of John Dodson, justice of the peace, a former Sheriff of Norwich. He was educated privately and at Downing College, Cambridge. He was called to the bar by the Inner Temple in 1907. During the First World War he served in the Royal Naval Volunteer Reserve in Scotland, where he was stationed with the composer Montague Phillips. It was during this time that the first sketches for the operetta The Rebel Maid were created. This work included the lyrics to the song 'The Fishermen of England', sung and broadcast all around the world.

From 1925 to 1934 he was Counsel to the Crown at the Central Criminal Court, and Recorder of Tenterden from 1932 to 1934, becoming a Judge that year. He was made Recorder of London in September 1937, succeeding Henry Holman Gregory, by the unanimous vote of the Court of Aldermen. He was knighted in 1939.

From 1945 Dodson began to have trouble with his eyesight, even learning braille at one point, but he recovered and was able to continue working. He married twice: to Emily Alice Chater in 1910, and after her death in 1961 to Marjorie Binks Heath three years later. His memoirs were published posthumously in 1967.
