= Montague Phillips =

English composer

Montague Fawcett Phillips (13 November 1885 – 4 January 1969) was a British composer of light classical music and songs, including the popular operetta The Rebel Maid of 1921.

== Career ==
Born in Tottenham, London, Phillips began his musical career as a choirboy at Saint Botolph's Church, Bishopsgate. He studied piano and organ and made his debut as an organist at the age of twelve. In 1901 he attended the Royal Academy of Music, studying with Frederick Corder and John Blackwood McEwen. His contemporaries at the academy included Arnold Bax, York Bowen and Benjamin Dale.

From 1904 Phillips was organist and choirmaster at Christ Church Wanstead, and from 1908 organist at Esher Parish Church, a position he held for 43 years. During the First World War he was part of the Royal Naval Volunteer Reserve in Scotland, where he was stationed with the librettist Gerald Dodson. It was during this time that the first sketches for his operetta The Rebel Maid were created. In 1926 he became a professor at the Royal Academy, while working as a freelance composer and performing as a pianist, accompanist and conductor. His students there included Dennis Brain.

Phillips was friendly with the composers Eric Coates and Haydn Wood. He lived in Esher for more than 50 years, residing at Clare Cottage, Clare Hill where he died in 1969 at the age of 84, outliving most of his contemporaries. His obituary in The Times described him as "essentially a composer in the salon tradition of the late nineteenth century, to which his musical idiom belonged". His wife Clara Butterworth, with whom he had a son and a daughter, survived him and most of her family, dying at the age of 109 in 1997.

== Music ==
His early work consisted mainly of ballad songs which he composed for his wife, the soprano and actress Clara Butterworth, whom he met at the Royal Academy and married in 1909. From 1905 onward his songs were frequently performed at the Proms. Many of them were collected into cycles such as Dream Songs (1912, lyrics Edward Teschemacher), Calendar of Song (1913, lyrics Harold Simpson) and From a Lattice Window (1920, lyrics Edward Lockton). The first larger scale work to gain attention (and publication) was his Magnificat and Nunc Dimitis in Bb, also of 1905.

In the first two decades of the century Phillips composed a series of extended concert works, such as the symphonic poem Boadicea (1907), the Symphony in C minor (1911), the Heroic Overture: A Shakespearian Scherzo (performed at the Proms five times between 1915 and 1926), two piano concertos (1907 and 1919) and a string quartet. The Piano Concerto No 2 in E major received its premiere at the Proms in 1920 and became a favourite of conductor Vilém Tauský. The Symphony appears not to have been performed in the composer's lifetime: it was recorded in 2004 and performed live for the first time at the English Music Festival, Dorchester on Thames, in May 2017.

His operetta The Rebel Maid was first produced at the London Empire, beginning on 12 March 1921, running for 114 performances. The plot concerns Devonshire fishermen in 1688 staging a rebellion in anticipation of a possible invasion by William of Orange. It was conducted by Howard Ellis Carr with Clara Butterworth singing the lead role of Lady Mary Trefusis, the rebel maid of the title. Selections were recorded by the Empire Theatre Orchestra on 20 May 1921 with the composer conducting and issued by Columbia Records. Although on stage for only four months due to the contemporary coal strike, it quickly became a staple of amateur operatic societies. The song 'The Fishermen of England' was particularly popular and often performed separately, as was Clara Butterworth's ballad 'Sail my Ships'. A suite of dances was also taken from the score. Despite this success, Phillips wrote only one other opera, The Golden Triangle, which was never performed.

But today he is best remembered for his light orchestral and piano pieces including suites of short, descriptive music such as Village Sketches (1932), The World in the Open Air (1933) and the Surrey Suite (1936), as well as single movements concert bands such as the overture Revelry (1937), the Empire March (1942, written for the Proms), and Hampton Court (1954, one of his last compositions). Phillips also wrote for the organ and for choirs.

Recordings of his orchestral music were issued in two volumes by Dutton in 2004 and 2005. These were followed by recordings of the two piano concertos in 2008 with soloist David Owen Norris.
