= Walter Hutchinson (publisher) =

British publisher (1887–1950)

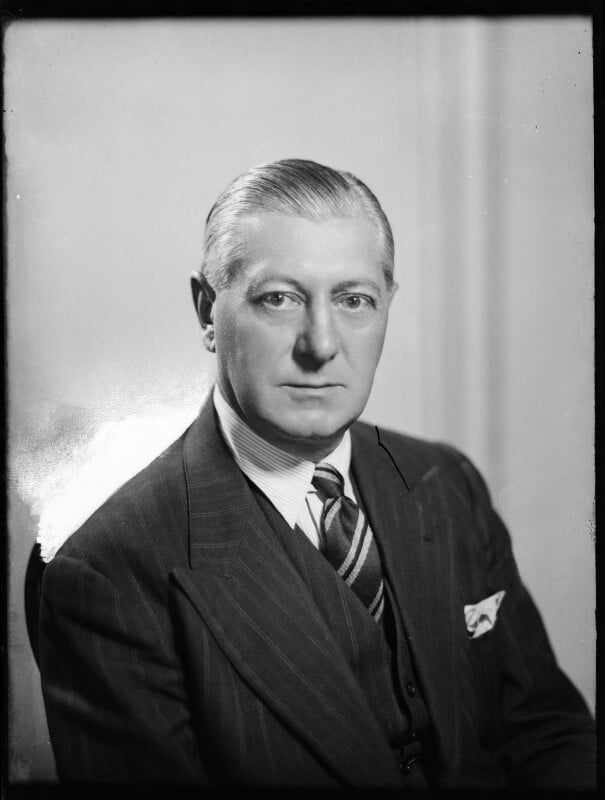
- Hutchinson in 1943
- Born: Walter Victor Hutchinson; 16 May 1887; Alfriston, England
- Died: 30 April 1950 (aged 62)
- Education: Oxford University (MA)

Walter Victor Hutchinson (16 May 1887 – 30 April 1950) was a British publisher who managed the Hutchinson publishing company, founded in London in 1887 by his father, Sir George Hutchinson.

== Early life ==
Hutchinson was born on 16 May 1887 to Sir George Thompson Hutchinson, an apprentice to Alexander Strahan and a publisher of popular fiction, and Frances Octavia Cornwall. For his education, Walter attended Highgate, Haileybury and St. John's College, Oxford. At Oxford he studied jurisprudence, leading to his being called to the Bar by the Inner Temple in 1911. However, he never went on to practice law and joined the family publishing firm in 1909.

== Government Service ==
In the First World War he was an honorary private secretary to the Secretary of the War Office from 1915 to 1919. From there he was superintendent of publicity and publications of the coalition Government. To this end he was founder and editor of Popular View, a publication 'devoted to the furtherance of their interests'.

== Publishing ==
Hutchinson took the decision to take the printing of his publications in house and founded the Hutchinson Printing Trust which published his four large volumes of The Story of the British Nation circa 1925.

He carried out a series of mergers, buying Jarrolds, Hurst and Blackett, Skeffington, Selwyn and Blount, Rider and Co., Andrew Melrose and Geographia Limited. Overall his companies (both publishing and other concerns) amounted to around 78 and had 10 farms.

During the Second World War he published two of Robert Vansittart, 1st Baron Vansittart's pamphlets – played a vital role in their production and distribution. However, compared with sales of some of Vansittart's brochures, the print runs of the Fight for Freedom pamphlets were relatively small, too small in fact to justify their commercial viability. There may have been some financial support from Lord Robert Vansittart, 1st Baron Vansittart, though there is no evidence to support such a claim.

In 1949 he opened a "National Gallery of British Sports and Pastimes", at Hutchinson House, off Oxford Street, but financial troubles led to its quick demise and the collection was sold in 1951.
