= André Barde =

French writer

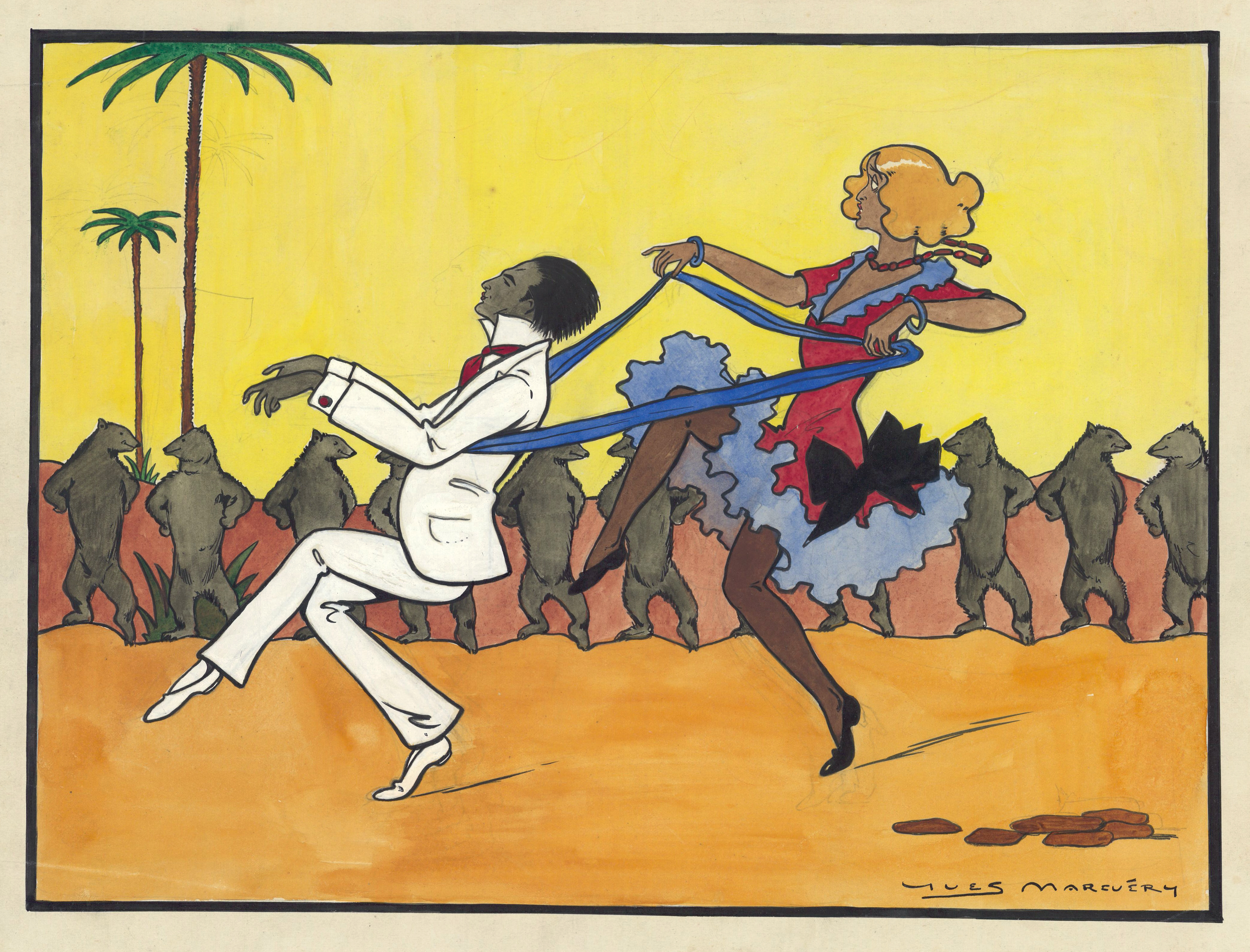
Print depicting Gaby Deslys and Harry Pilcer in a 1913 revue at the Théâtre Marigny written by Barde and Michel-Antoine Carré.

André Barde was the pseudonym of André Bourdonneau (July 1874, Meudon – October 1945, Paris), a French writer best known for his libretti for operettas. He was active from 1895-1936. In 1895, he collaborated with composer Marcel Legay on Chansons cruelles, chansons douces, a book of songs. He frequently collaborated with composer Charles Cuvillier - Son petit frère (1907) (expanded to the three act Laïs, ou la Courtisane Amoureuse in 1912), Afgar (1909), La Reine joyeuse (1912), Sappho (1912), Florabella (1921), and Nonnette (1922) being some examples. He wrote four revues produced at the Théâtre Marigny, in 1910, 1912, and 1913 with Michel-Antoine Carré and in 1914 by himself. His works include Pas sur la bouche (1925; in English: "Not on the Mouth"), which has been filmed twice.
