= Writers' room =

Room where script writers gather to work

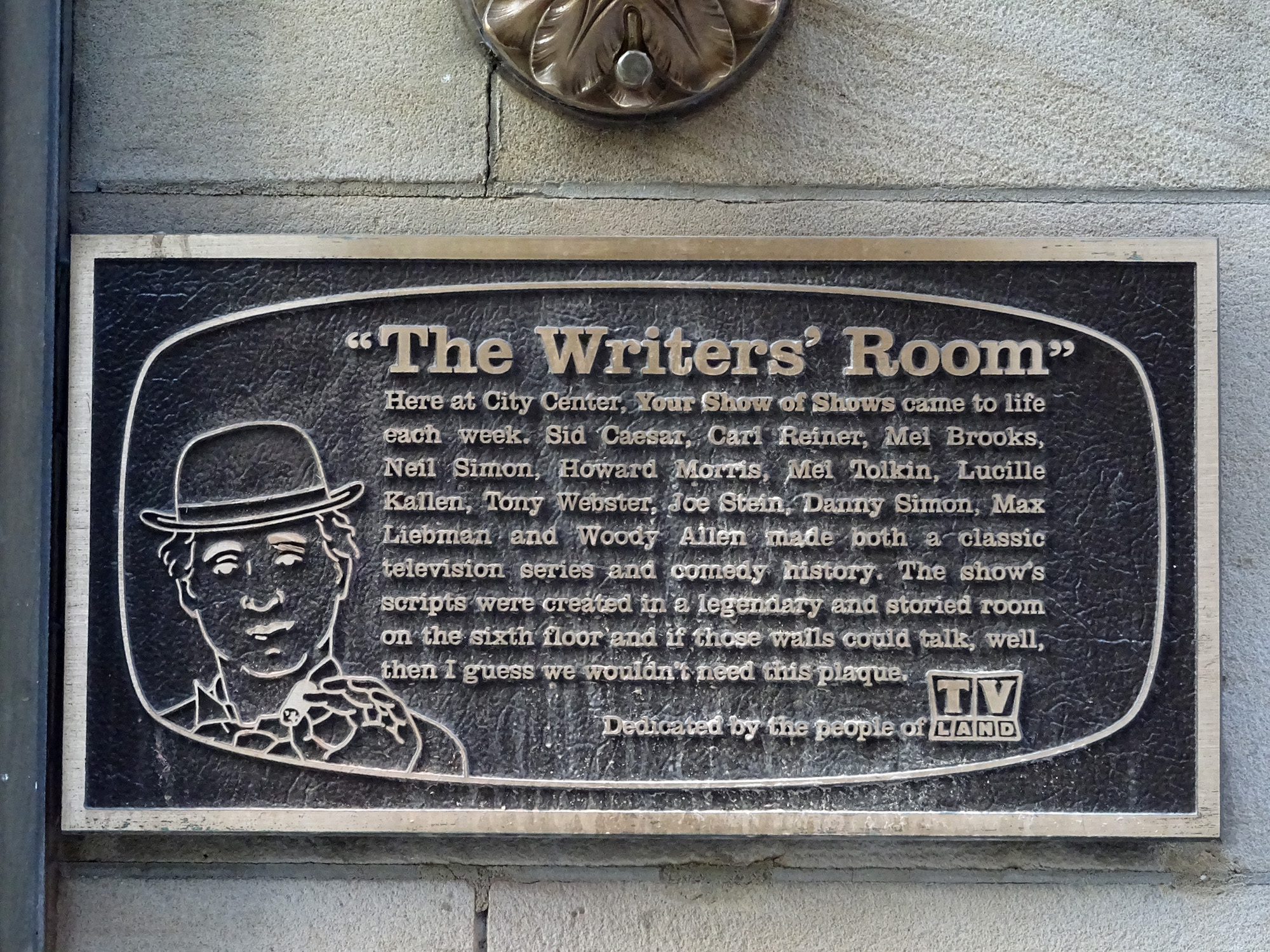
The Writers' Room plaque in New York City for Your Show of Shows

A writers' room is a space where writers, usually of a television series, gather to write and refine scripts. It is a common method of writing television series in the US, but is much less widespread in countries like the UK.

== Composition ==
The television industry has long had a collaborative model for writing shows, though not all shows use a writers' room.

With the explosion of scripted shows, and the competition among the networks and streaming channels, a "fluidity has developed to the way shows are created." The writers' room follows no single formula; it is an open-ended process with a range of set-ups. Room sizes vary from two to thirty, depending on the budget and number of episodes, each room with its own rules.

"Mini-rooms" exist for limited series and smaller shows, mostly those not yet approved. Mini-rooms consist of fewer writers than ordinary writers' rooms, who are paid less, and may not be employed for the duration of the production.

The "proliferation" of mini-rooms in the 2020s, partly as a cost-cutting measure by producers, was one of the major issues in the 2023 Writers Guild of America strike. Historically, television seasons had so many episodes that writers' rooms worked on the later episodes while filming began on the first few episodes. Thus, writers had plenty of writing work to keep them busy, and were also able to provide extensive feedback on the production of early episodes and interact with cast and crew on set. This traditional arrangement allowed them to gain valuable experience on the production side so they could then pitch their own shows and become showrunners someday. The shift to shorter seasons for streaming series meant that mini-rooms would churn out an entire season of scripts first, then only the showrunner and one writer would remain with the series throughout principal photography to revise those scripts further as needed. This shift meant less work and less money for writers, along with fewer opportunities to graduate to showrunner.

== Roles in writers' rooms ==
The showrunner runs the entire writers' room. They have overall responsibility for the entire series; they are in charge of the budget, scripts, crew, keeping actors happy and interacting with the studio or network. They are usually writers themselves and are generally listed as executive producers.

An executive producer is a writer and second in charge and may act on behalf of the showrunner.

Producers in television writer's rooms are typically writers who have moved up the room hierarchy. This group includes co-producers. They are involved in script approvals, casting, production and creative direction. A line producer is a managerial position, and often not a writer.

Executive story editor is a mid-level writer in charge of groups of staff writers.

Staff writer is an entry level writing position, reserved for someone working on their first or second scripts.

Writers' assistant is often a coveted early-career job in the industry. The assistant takes notes in the room and interacts with the writers and creators. They learn the business from the inside and make contacts. They do research, produce web material and occasionally make creative pitches.

Bill Lawrence, a television screenwriter, has said that:

... the end credits of a TV show, it will say staff writer, story editor, executive story Editor, co-producer, producer, supervising producer, co-executive producer, executive producer. (While) (s)omeone else will (also) be executive producer because they help to run the room, every other title is just ... writer who's been here one year, writer who's been here two years, writer who's been here three years, ... and it's just a pay scale.

== Notable writers' rooms ==
- I Love Lucy with Madelyn Pugh, Bob Carroll, Jr., Bob Schiller and Bob Weiskopf
- Your Show of Shows with Mel Brooks, Carl Reiner, Howard Morris, Woody Allen, Tony Webster, Lucille Kallen, Selma Diamond, Danny Simon, Mel Tolkin, Max Liebman, Sid Caeser and Neil Simon. Five years after the Holocaust and in the midst of the Blacklist (which frequently targeted Jewish writers) it has been noted that they were all Jewish except for Webster.
- The Smothers Brothers Comedy Hour with Steve Martin, Carl Gottlieb, Rob Reiner, Allan Blye, Mason Williams Pat Paulsen, Tony Webster, Ron Clark and Bob Einstein
- The Dana Carvey Show with Steve Carell, Louis C.K., Stephen Colbert, Robert Smigel, Robert Carlock, Jon Glaser, Dino Stamatopoulos and Dana Carvey
- The Dick Van Dyke Show with Carl Reiner, Garry Marshall, Sam Denoff, Sheldon Keller, Dale McRaven, John Whedon, and Jerry Belson.
- SCTV (1976–1981) with Rick Moranis, Eugene Levy, Harold Ramis, John Candy, Joe Flaherty, Catherine O'Hara, and Dave Thomas.
- Saturday Night Live with Bill Murray, Chevy Chase, Al Franken, Rob Smigel, Conan O'Brien, Bob Odenkirk, Gilda Radner and many others.
- Late Night with Conan O'Brien (circa 1993-1994) with Tom Agna, Andy Richter, Conan O'Brien, Louis C.K., Bob Odenkirk, Robert Smigel, and Dino Stamatopoulos.

== In popular culture ==
The Dick Van Dyke Show ran on CBS from 1961–1967. One of the show's leading story lines centered on the work of television comedy writer Rob Petrie (Dick Van Dyke), the head writer for the fictional Alan Brady Show in New York. The show was based on Carl Reiner's life and was an early television depiction of a writers' room.

The Writers' Room was a 2013–2014 American television talk show hosted by screenwriter and actor Jim Rash. Each episode featured a behind-the-scenes look at the writing staff of popular television series.

In the fifth and final season of The Marvelous Mrs. Maisel, stand-up comedian Midge Maisel is largely relegated to a writers' room.

The Writers Room, founded in 1978, is a workspace in New York City where writers work on their projects and have access to reference materials and fellow writers.

== Shows without a writers' room ==
Not every show uses a writers' room - some shows, especially in the UK, where writers' rooms are rarely used, either use a single writer or hire freelancers on a per-episode basis. HBO's Michael Lombardo said in 2015 that he preferred British scripts because they were more "voice-driven" for not being from a writers' room.

== Criticisms ==
Criticisms include lack of diversity, including age, gender, socio-economic and racial/ethnic backgrounds; hierarchical structure which leads to a toxic culture where junior writers are overlooked, abused and exploited; stress from long hours and high pressure to meet tight schedules; lack of credit for junior writers; lack of job security and need for a living wage; and, sexism.
