= Laughter on the 23rd Floor =

Play by Neil Simon

Poster for the original Broadway production

Laughter on the 23rd Floor is a 1993 play by Neil Simon. It focuses on the star and writers of a TV comedy-variety show in the 1950s, inspired by Simon's own early career experience as a junior writer (along with his brother Danny) for Your Show of Shows and Caesar's Hour.

== Plot overview ==
The play focuses on Sid Caesar-like Max Prince, the star of a weekly comedy-variety show circa 1953, and his staff, including Simon's alter-ego Lucas Brickman, who maintains a running commentary on the writing, fighting, and wacky antics which take place in the writers' room. Max has an ongoing battle with NBC executives, who fear his humor is too sophisticated for Middle America. The play is notable not only for its insider's look at the personalities and processes of television comedy writing, but also for its reflection of the political and social undercurrents of its time, in particular the rise of Joseph McCarthy, relationships between various (European) American ethnicities, and attitudes toward women.

== Relation to real life ==
Laughter on the 23rd Floor is a roman à clef, with the characters in the play based on Neil Simon's co-writers on Your Show of Shows. Lloyd Rose, in her Washington Post review, noted several of the real-life inspirations: the "Sid Caesar–inspired Max Prince", "hypochondriac Ira (played by Ron Orbach, inspired by Mel Brooks)" ... and "fussy Russian emigre Val (Mark Linn-Baker, inspired by Mel Tolkin) .... There is no character based on Woody Allen." Like many Rose attributes "dryly witty, sane Kenny (John Slattery) as inspired by Larry Gelbart and Carl Reiner when it was actually only Gelbart. The Ira Stone character is often misattributed to Allen, as the character in the play is a hypochondriac and Allen went on to use that affectation to great effect in his own comedy career. Simon actually was poking fun at Brooks. The real-life counterparts for each character are:

Lucas Brickman	Neil Simon
Max Prince	Sid Caesar
Kenny Franks	Larry Gelbart
Val Slotsky	Mel Tolkin
Brian Doyle	Tony Webster
Milt Fields	Sheldon Keller
Carol Wyman	Lucille Kallen & Selma Diamond
Ira Stone	Mel Brooks

According to Simon, Sid Caesar's writers on the original Your Show of Shows (including Neil Simon and his older brother Danny Simon) held their script sessions at various times on the eleventh and the twelfth floors of an NBC-TV office building; Simon added those numbers together to put his fictional cast on the 23rd floor.

== Productions ==
Laughter on the 23rd Floor opened on Broadway at the Richard Rodgers Theatre on November 22, 1993 and closed on August 27, 1994, after 320 performances and 24 previews. Directed by Jerry Zaks the cast featured Nathan Lane (Max), Ron Orbach (Ira), Randy Graff (Carol), Mark Linn-Baker (Val), Bitty Schram (Helen), J. K. Simmons (Brian), John Slattery (Kenny), and Lewis J. Stadlen (Milt). The play was first performed at Duke University. Stephen Mailer played Simon's young stand-in Lucas.

Paul Provenza was originally cast as Ira Stone, but was fired prior to opening.

A West End production headed by Gene Wilder opened on October 3, 1996, at the Queen's Theatre, where it ran for five months.

In April and May 2011, Laughter on the 23rd Floor received a newly conceived production in Philadelphia at 1812 Productions. This production took place in repertory with an original comedy, Our Show of Shows, an homage to Sid Caesar's Your Show of Shows. This was the first time Laughter on the 23rd Floor was presented with a companion piece. Neil Simon and Sid Caesar both gave their personal approval for this repertory production, and Eddy Friedfeld, co-author of Sid Caesar's autobiography, Caesar's Hours, served as the dramaturg for both shows. Of the companion piece, Our Show of Shows, Sid Caesar wrote, “To the superb cast and crew of 1812 Productions: Thank you for keeping my legacy alive.”

== Adaptation ==
Lane repeated his role for the 2001 television movie written by Simon and directed by Richard Benjamin. Reviewer John Leonard wrote that the film "captured the neurotic genius of Sid Caesar and all those famous comedy writers for Your Show of Shows, like Simon, Mel Brooks, Woody Allen, Larry Gelbart, and Carl Reiner". Mark Evanier notes that Simon added a new character for the film, Harry Prince, based on Caesar's brother David and the teleplay "[uses] almost none of the play." The cast included Nathan Lane, Saul Rubinek, Victor Garber, Peri Gilpin, Mark Linn-Baker, Ian D. Clark, and Dan Castellaneta.
