= The Dick Emery Show =

British TV comedy series (1963–1981)

- The Dick Emery Show opening title sequence.
- Created by: David Cummings
- Starring: Dick Emery; Pat Coombs; Deryck Guyler; Roy Kinnear; Joan Sims; Josephine Tewson; Arthur English
- Country of origin: United Kingdom
- Original language: English
- No. of series: 18
- No. of episodes: 166(85 missing)

Production
- Running time: 25–50 minutes
- Production company: BBC

Original release
- Network: BBC1 (1963-64, 1969-81); BBC2 (1965-67)
- Release: 13 July 1963 – 7 February 1981

The Dick Emery Show is a British sketch comedy show starring Dick Emery. It was broadcast on the BBC from 1963 to 1981. It was directed and produced by Harold Snoad. The show was broadcast over 18 series with 166 episodes. The show experienced sustained popularity in the 1960s and 1970s. The BBC described the show as featuring 'a vivid cast of comic grotesques'.

Frequent performers included Pat Coombs, Victor Maddern, Deryck Guyler, Roy Kinnear, Joan Sims and Josephine Tewson.

The principal writers of the programme were David Cummings, John Singer and John Warren. Additional contributions were by David Nobbs and Peter Tinniswood. Other writers included Dick Clement, Barry Cryer, Selma Diamond, John Esmonde, Marty Feldman, Lucille Kallen, Bob Larbey and Harold Pinter. The American comedy writers Mel Brooks and Mel Tolkin contributed sketches in the early years of the show. The nature of the show with its rapid sketches was initially inspired by the American sketch show Your Show of Shows starring Sid Caesar that was broadcast between 1950 and 1954 on NBC. Emery later developed his own characters for sketches.

The show became anachronistic with the advent of the 1980s, and has subsequently been perceived as homophobic, racist, and sexist. In an appraisal of The Dick Emery Show the BBC wrote that none of the show's sketches would 'seem out of place' on the 2000s' BBC sketch show Little Britain.

Peri Bradley critiqued the show in the chapter "The Politics of Camp" in British Culture and Society in the 1970s: The Lost Decade. Bradley examined how camp could "operate as a political and liberating force" in the 1970s; and felt that Emery's characters "comprised representations [which] instigated" a "transformation of consciousness" as described by the gender theorist Judith Butler.

Outtakes of corpsing from the series were subsequently included in the show in a section called 'The Comedy of Errors'.

== Characters ==
Characters portrayed by Emery included: Bovver Boy, a hapless skinhead whose father was played by Roy Kinnear; the camp and cheerful Clarence; First World War veteran Lampwick; and Mandy, a 'very friendly' middle-aged blonde bombshell. Some other characters were College (an intellectual tramp); the 'menopausal would-be-maneater' Hetty; and Ton-up Boy, the biker. Hetty and Mandy were both played by Emery in drag.

== Vox pops ==
Contrived vox pops with the show's characters were a notable feature; this would later be featured in the shows of Fry and Laurie. The format was developed by David Cummings and the interviewer was played by Deryck Guyler and later by Gordon Clyde. Each character played by Emery would be asked the same question by the interviewer. The vox pops that featured Mandy, a 'very friendly blonde bombshell', would end with her perceiving a double entendre in the innocuous question of the reporter and then after giving them a 'friendly but over-forceful push' and saying her catchphrase, "Ooh, you are awful, but I like you". The popularity of Mandy's catchphrase would see it included in the Oxford Dictionary of Modern Quotations, described as 'Mandy's habitual protest'.

== Home media ==
An 85-minute compilation titled Comedy Greats: Dick Emery containing the very best sketches from The Dick Emery Show was released on UK PAL VHS by BBC Video on 11 October 1999.

This was re-released on Region 2 DVD on 11 July 2005 by 2 Entertain Video BBC Studios titled: The Best of Dick Emery.
