= Mel Tolkin =

American comedy writer (1913–2007)

- Born: Shmuel Tolchinsky; August 3, 1913; Near Odessa, Russian Empire
- Died: November 26, 2007 (aged 94); Century City, California, U.S.
- Other name: Samuel Tolchinsky
- Occupation: Television comedy writer
- Years active: 1940s–1980s
- Notable work: Your Show of Shows
- Awards: Emmy Award; Humanitas Prize; Peabody Award; Four Writers Guild of America Awards

Mel Tolkin (né Shmuel Tolchinsky; August 3, 1913 – November 26, 2007) was an American television comedy writer best known as head writer of the live sketch comedy series Your Show of Shows (NBC, 1950–1954) during the Golden Age of Television. There he presided over a staff that at times included Mel Brooks, Neil Simon, and Danny Simon. The writers' room inspired the film My Favorite Year (1982), produced by Brooks, and the Broadway play Laughter on the 23rd Floor (1993), written by Neil Simon.

Tolkin, who won an Emmy Award and every other major prize for television writing, was the father of screenwriter-novelist Michael Tolkin and TV writer-director Stephen Tolkin.

== Biography ==
=== Early life and career ===
Mel Tolkin was born Shmuel Tolchinsky (Russian: Тол(ь)чинский, cog. Тульчинский, Ukrainian: Толчинський, Polish: Tolczyński, cog. Tulczyński, means "from Tuľčyn") in a Jewish shtetl near Odessa in the Russian Empire (now Ukraine), the son of Nessie (Cartman) and Mendel "Max" Tolchinsky, a labourer and door-to-door salesman.

A background of anti-Semitic pogroms, shared by other comedy writers of his generation, he noted in 1992, "I'm not happy to have to say ... created the condition where humor becomes anger made acceptable with a joke".

His family moved to Montreal, Quebec, Canada in 1926, where Tolkin became known as Samuel. He studied accounting after graduating from high school, and surreptitiously entered show business by composing songs and sketches for local revues and playing piano in jazz clubs. Fearing his parents would disapprove of what they would see as an impractical career choice, he began using the pseudonym Mel Tolkin.

During World War II, Tolkin did military service in the Canadian Army, playing the glockenspiel in a military orchestra. He moved to New York City, New York, in 1946, and married Edith Leibovitch that year. Teaming with Lucille Kallen, who would become his longtime writing partner, Tolkin began concocting comedy for performers at the Poconos resort Camp Tamiment. In 1949, the duo became the sole writing staff of the NBC television network variety show The Admiral Broadway Revue. By the following year, that series, starring Sid Caesar and Imogene Coca, had evolved into Your Show of Shows.

=== Your Show of Shows ===
Considered by TV historians as a classic of the medium, with Ronald C. Simon, television curator of The Paley Center for Media calling it "a pinnacle of television history", the series presented 90 minutes of comedy live each week for 39 weeks a year, for a total of 160 shows airing February 25, 1950, to June 5, 1954. From its sixth-floor office on West 56th Street in Manhattan, writers including Mel Brooks, Neil Simon, Danny Simon, Larry Gelbart, and Lucille Kallen.

Tolkin, famously fought, argued, quipped, crafted, "paced, muttered, swore, occasionally typed and more than occasionally threw things: crumpled paper cups, cigars (lighted) and much else. The acoustical-tile ceiling was fringed with pencils, which had been flung aloft in a rage and stuck fast; Mr. Tolkin once counted 39 of them suspended there".

The series quickly settled into a starring quartet of Caesar, Coca, Carl Reiner and Howard Morris. Many of its sketches became classics that found a new audience beginning in 1973, when the show's producer-director, Max Liebman, compiled the theatrical film release 10 From Your Show of Shows. Tolkin continued writing on an acclaimed successor series, Caesar's Hour, which ran September 27, 1954, through 1957. He also wrote the theme song for Your Show of Shows, "Stars Over Broadway".

=== Later life and career ===
Tolkin wrote for the 1968–1970 CBS situation comedy The Good Guys (which starred Bob Denver, Herb Edelman, and Joyce Van Patten). For six years in the 1970s, he was a story editor for the landmark CBS sitcom All in the Family, writing several of its scripts. He also wrote for the sequel series Archie Bunker's Place, and for the 1981–1983 Tony Randall sitcom Love, Sidney.

Tolkin died of heart failure at age 94, at his home in Century City, California. Aside from children and grandchildren, he was survived by his wife, Edith, and by a brother, Sol Tolchinsky. He was interred at Hillside Memorial Park Cemetery in Los Angeles, California.

=== Other writing ===
Tolkin also wrote comedy for the standup comics and nightclub entertainers Bob Hope, Jerry Lewis, Danny Kaye, and Danny Thomas, who later became stars.

== Awards ==
Tolkin received a Peabody Award.

Tolkin and co-writers Sam Denoff, Bill Persky, and Carl Reiner shared the 1967 Outstanding Writing Achievement in Variety Emmy Award, for The Sid Caesar, Imogene Coca, Carl Reiner, Howard Morris Special.

With writing partner Larry Rhine, Tolkin shared a 1978 Humanitas Prize for 30 Minute Network or Syndicated Television, for the All in the Family episode "The Brother". Rhine and Tolkin also shared a 1977 nomination in that category, for the All in the Family episode "Archie's Brief Encounter - Part II".

Writers Guild of America Awards :

- 1965: Television: Variety: Series or Special: Musical or Comedy

The Danny Kaye Show (1963-64), shared with Herbert Baker, Sheldon Keller, Saul Ilson, Ernest Chambers, Gary Belkin, Paul Mazursky, and Larry Tucker

- 1966: Television: Variety: Series or Special: Musical or Comedy

The Danny Kaye Show with Art Carney, shared with Sheldon Keller, Gary Belkin, Ernest Chambers, Larry Tucker, Paul Mazursky, Billy Barnes, and Ron Friedman

- 1968: Television: Variety: Series or Special: Musical or Comedy

The Sid Caesar, Imogene Coca, Carl Reiner, Howard Morris Special, shared with Mel Brooks, Sam Denoff, William Persky, and Carl Reiner

- 1978: Television: Episodic Comedy

All in the Family ("Archie Gets the Business - Parts I & II"), shared with Larry Rhine

== Nominations ==
Emmy nominations:

- Best Comedy Writing - 1956

for Caesar's Hour (NBC), shared with Mel Brooks, Selma Diamond, Larry Gelbart, and Sheldon Keller

- Best Comedy Writing - Variety Or Situation Comedy - 1957

for Caesar's Hour (NBC), shared with Gary Belkin, Mel Brooks, Larry Gelbart, Sheldon Keller, Neil Simon, and Mike Stewart

- Best Comedy Writing - 1958

for Caesar's Hour (NBC), shared with Gary Belkin, Mel Brooks, Larry Gelbart, Sheldon Keller, Neil Simon, and Mike Stewart

- Outstanding Writing Achievement in Comedy or Variety - 1964

The Danny Kaye Show (CBS), shared with Herbert Baker, Gary Belkin, Ernest Chambers, Larry Gelbart, Saul Ilson, Sheldon Keller, Paul Mazursky, and Larry Tucker

Writers Guild of America Award nominations:

- 1966: Television: Variety: Series or Special: Musical or Comedy

The Danny Kaye Show with Fred Gwynne, shared with Sheldon Keller, Gary Belkin, Ernest Chambers, Larry Tucker, Paul Mazursky, Billy Barnes, and Ron Friedman

- 1977 Television: Episodic Comedy

All in the Family ("Joey's Baptism"), shared with Larry Rhine and Milt Josefsberg

== Legacy ==
The Your Show of Shows writers' room inspired the film My Favorite Year (1982), produced by Brooks, and the Broadway play Laughter on the 23rd Floor (1993), written by Neil Simon.
