= Marguerite Piazza =

American opera singer and philanthropist

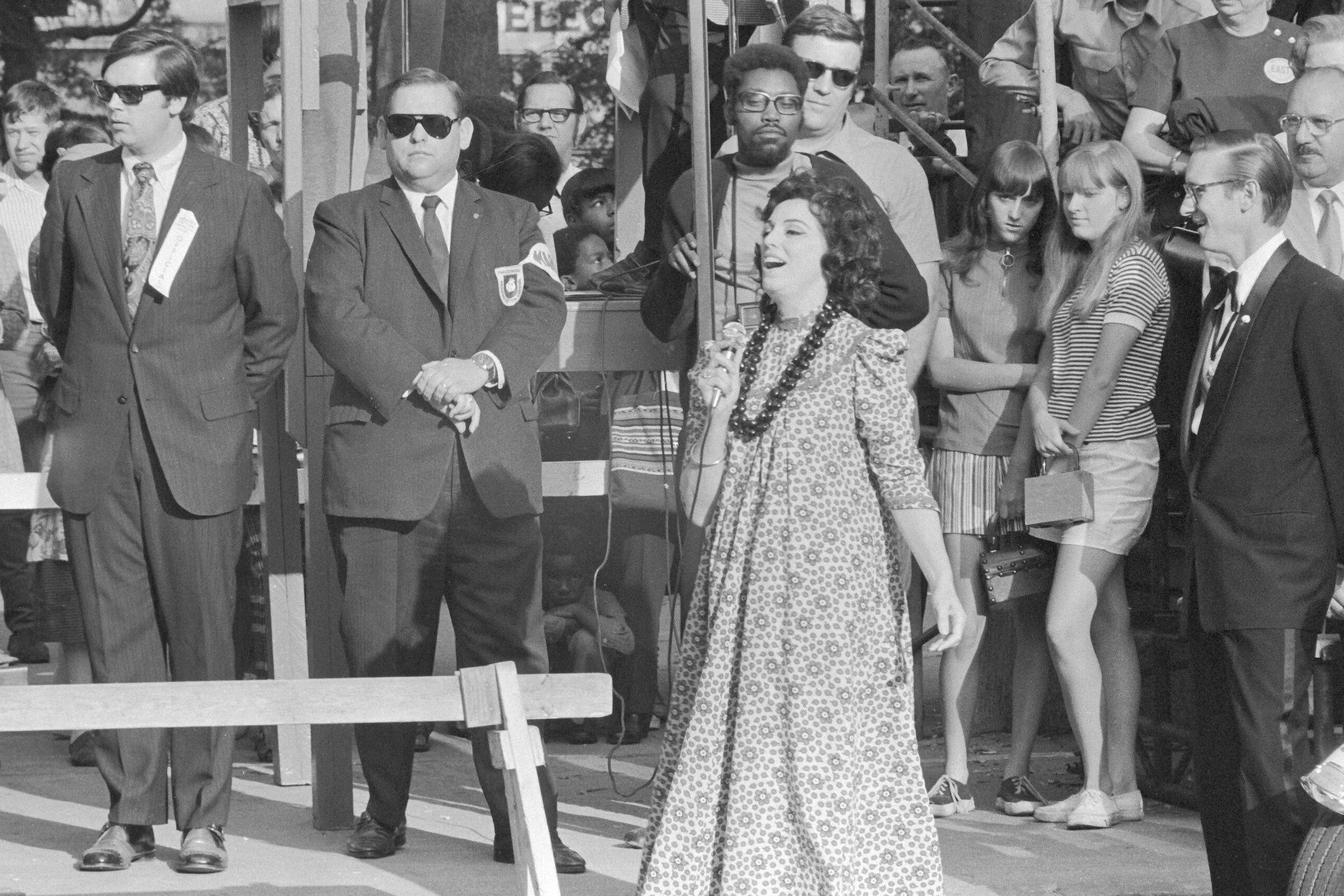
- Marguerite Piazza performing in Memphis, Tennessee, in 1973
- Born: May 6, 1920; New Orleans, Louisiana
- Died: August 2, 2012 (aged 92); Memphis, Tennessee
- Education: Loyola University New Orleans
- Occupations: Opera singer, philanthropist
- Children: 6

Marguerite Piazza (May 6, 1920 – August 2, 2012) was an American soprano, entertainer and philanthropist from New Orleans, Louisiana.

== Early life ==
In 1920, Piazza was born as Marguerite Clair Lucille Luft. Piazza's parents were Albert William Luft, Jr. (c. 1897–September 12, 1923) and Margherita (née Piazza; c. 1900–1958, later known as Margaret), who wed on January 24, 1917. Around 1927, Piazza's mother Margaret Luft wed Reuben Davis Breland, whose surname Marguerite adopted.

== Education ==
In 1940, Piazza earned a degree from Loyola University of the South's College of Music. Piazza attended Louisiana State University, where she was a student of the baritone Pasquale Amato.

== Career ==
Piazza was the first Queen of the Krewe of Virgilians during Mardi Gras in her native New Orleans.

In 1944, she joined the New York City Opera, and was the youngest member of the company. Her first role was Nedda in Pagliacci, and in subsequent seasons appeared in La bohème (as Musetta), Der Zigeunerbaron, Don Giovanni (as Donna Elvira, in Theodore Komisarjevsky's production), and Amelia al ballo (as Amelia). She made her first appearance with the New Orleans Opera Association in Martha (in 1945), followed by Hänsel und Gretel (as Gretel), as well as the title role in Il segreto di Susanna. In 1950, Piazza made her Broadway debut, in Happy as Larry, with Burgess Meredith directing and starring in the title rôle, and Alexander Calder designing.

As a result of that production, the soprano was invited to join the cast of the NBC television program Your Show of Shows, which starred Sid Caesar and Imogene Coca (1950–54). She made her debut at the Metropolitan Opera in 1951, as Rosalinde von Eisenstein in Die Fledermaus. Following the end of Your Show of Shows, she embarked on a career in supper and night clubs, bringing her further acclaim as an entertainer.

Piazza's personal papers are archived at Loyola University New Orleans.

During the nineteen-fifties, Piazza was a paid spokeswoman for Camel cigarettes. In the 1960s she endured three melanoma-related operations, and in the 1970s was treated successfully for uterine cancer. In 1971, the soprano was honored by then President Richard M. Nixon for her courage in fighting the disease.

She performed and was a noted philanthropist in her adopted hometown of Memphis, where she was a longtime supporter of St. Jude Children's Research Hospital. She sang the national anthem at no fewer than twenty-seven Liberty Bowl football games.

Piazza was celebrated for her extensive efforts regarding various charities, especially the annual Marguerite Piazza Gala. On January 15, 1973, the Willis Music Company published Marguerite Piazza's Christmas Carol Sing-Along Party. Piazza's autobiography (co-authored with her daughter, Marguerite Bonnett), Pagliacci Has Nothing on Me!, was published in 2007 (ISBN 978-1-84728-394-8). Piazza was inducted into the Memphis Music Hall of Fame in 2016, becoming the first opera singer to be honored by the organization.

== Personal life ==
On the advice of Armando Agnini, she adopted her mother's maiden name (Piazza) professionally.

Piazza was married four times. She was widowed three times and divorced once. She had six children; one of her sons died by suicide. She was diagnosed with cancer in the 1970s. Marguerite Piazza died in Memphis, Tennessee, on August 2, 2012, aged 92, from congestive heart failure, and was survived by her five children and large extended family.

== Additional sources ==
- Marshall, Keith. (2013), The Devil Made Her: Opera Star Marguerite Piazza and the Virgilians, The "Mardi Gras Guide" (pamphlet).
