= Admiral Broadway Revue =

1949 American television variety show

- Genre: Variety
- Created by: Max Liebman
- Written by: Mel Brooks; Lucille Kallen; Max Liebman; Mel Tolkin
- Directed by: Max Liebman
- Starring: Sid Caesar; Imogene Coca; Marge Champion; Gower Champion
- Country of origin: United States
- No. of episodes: 19

Production
- Producer: Max Liebman
- Camera setup: Multi-camera
- Running time: 52 minutes

Original release
- Network: DuMont; NBC
- Release: January 28 – June 3, 1949

Admiral Broadway Revue is an American live television variety show that ran from January 28 to June 3, 1949. The show was notable for being "television's first full scale Broadway type musical revue."

== Distribution ==
The program was broadcast live on Fridays from 8 to 9 p.m. ET simultaneously on both the NBC and DuMont networks. Live broadcasts were carried by 24 stations in 16 cities. Another 14 stations broadcast kinescope recordings of the live episodes.

The dual-network distribution resulted from Admiral executives' desire to have the program on NBC and to have it seen in Chicago. During the show's time slot, DuMont had sole use of the coaxial cable linking New York City to Chicago. Therefore, the company used both networks.

== Overview ==
Episodes of Admiral Broadway Revue included music, comedy, well-known guest stars and "lavish production numbers". Each episode's dances, sketches, and songs related to a common theme such as cross-country, night life, and Radio City.

The show was telecast from the since-demolished International Theatre (also known as the Park Theatre) at 5 Columbus Circle in New York City. The hour-long series was directed by Max Liebman, hosted by Sid Caesar, and also starred Imogene Coca. Liebman, Caesar, and Coca went on to work on NBC's Your Show of Shows, which debuted February 25, 1950.

The series was sponsored by TV-set manufacturer Admiral, a competitor of NBC's parent company RCA and of DuMont, both of which manufactured TV sets. The cancellation of the series resulted from demand for Admiral's TV sets exceeding the company's manufacturing capacity. Admiral's executives chose to shift the money spent on the program into an increase in manufacturing capabilities.

Its final episode aired June 3, 1949.

== Personnel ==
Admiral Broadway Revue provided the first pairing of Caesar and Coca. Marge and Gower Champion performed dance numbers on the shows. Others appearing on the show included comic Spoonerism monologist Roy Atwell, Mary McCarty, Bobby Van, and Loren Welch. Charles Sanford conducted the orchestra, and Don Walker orchestrated the music. Writers for the program included Lucille Kallen and Mel Tolkin.

== Episode and script status ==
Episodes of Admiral Broadway Revue were made available on videocassettes by Video Dimensions. The Paley Center for Media holds 18 kinescope episodes of the series, and the UCLA Film and Television Archive has one episode.

In 2000, workers who opened an apparently overlooked closet in New York City Center found boxes of papers that belonged to Liebman, including "many scripts" from Admiral Broadway Revue. A contemporary newspaper report indicated that the papers would go to the Library of Congress, where researchers could use them.

== See also ==
- List of programs broadcast by the DuMont Television Network
- List of surviving DuMont Television Network broadcasts
