= 4th Primetime Emmy Awards =

- Date: February 18, 1952
- Location: Cocoanut Grove, Los Angeles, California
- Presented by: Academy of Television Arts and Sciences
- Hosted by: Lucille Ball; Desi Arnaz

Highlights
- Best Comedy Show: The Red Skelton Show
- Best Dramatic Show: Studio One
- Best Variety Show: Your Show of Shows

Television/radio coverage
- Network: KECA

The 4th Emmy Awards, retroactively known as the 4th Primetime Emmy Awards after the debut of the Daytime Emmy Awards, were presented at the Cocoanut Grove in Los Angeles, California on February 18, 1952. The ceremonies were hosted by Lucille Ball and Desi Arnaz.

This was the first year that nominations were considered on a national television network basis. Previously, the Emmys were primarily given out to shows that were produced or aired in the Los Angeles area.

== Winners and nominees ==
Winners are listed first, highlighted in boldface, and indicated with a double dagger (‡).

=== Programs ===
Programs
**Best Comedy Show**: **The Red Skelton Show (NBC)**‡; The George Burns and Gracie Allen Show (CBS); Herb Shriner Show (ABC); You Bet Your Life (NBC); I Love Lucy (CBS)	**Best Dramatic Show**: **Studio One (CBS)**‡; Celanese Theatre (ABC); Philco-Goodyear TV Playhouse (NBC); Pulitzer Prize Playhouse (ABC); Robert Montgomery Presents (NBC)
**Best Variety Show**: **Your Show of Shows (NBC)**‡; All Star Revue (NBC); The Colgate Comedy Hour (NBC); The Fred Waring Show (CBS); Toast of the Town (CBS)

=== Acting ===
Acting
**Best Actor**: **Sid Caesar**‡; Walter Hampden; Charlton Heston; Thomas Mitchell; Robert Montgomery; Vaughn Taylor	**Best Actress**: **Imogene Coca**‡; Helen Hayes; Maria Riva; Mary Sinclair; Margaret Sullavan

=== Hosting ===
Hosting
**Best Comedian or Comedienne**
- **Red Skelton (NBC)**‡
  - Lucille Ball (CBS)
  - Sid Caesar (NBC)
  - Imogene Coca (NBC)
  - Jimmy Durante (NBC)
  - Jerry Lewis and Dean Martin (NBC)
  - Herb Shriner (ABC)
