= James Starbuck =

American ballet dancer and choreographer (1912–1997)

James Starbuck (March 13, 1912, Albuquerque, New Mexico – August 13, 1997, Beverly Hills, California) was an American choreographer, ballet dancer, musical theatre actor, and stage and television director.

He studied modern dance with Martha Graham and ballet with Adolph Bolm, Edward Caton, Vera Nemtchinova, and Anatole Oboukhov. He was a principal dancer with first the San Francisco Opera Ballet from 1935-1938 and then the Ballet Russe de Monte-Carlo from 1938-1944. He was notably the first American man to dance with the latter company. He portrayed roles in the original productions of several Broadway musicals, including both Freddy and Tito in Song of Norway (1944), Ivan Petrofski in Music in My Heart (1947), and Walt in Sleepy Hollow (1948). He also choreographed two Broadway musicals, Michael Todd's Peep Show (1950) and Oh Captain! (1958), and was the associate director of the Broadway play A Thurber Carnival (1960).

A pioneering choreographer in the early years of American television, Starbuck began his career in that medium in 1947 as the resident choreographer for Your Show of Shows; also appearing frequently as a featured dancer on that program in parodies of classic ballets with Imogene Coca as his dance partner. He also choreographed and danced in numbers with guest ballet dancers Alicia Markova, Mia Slavenska, and Maria Tallchief. He was nominated for the Primetime Emmy Award for Outstanding Choreography in 1956 for his work on the programs Max Liebman Presents and Shower of Stars with Ethel Merman. He later won two Emmy Awards for his work as choreographer and director of The Arthur Murray Party and The Andy Williams Show.
