= The Straw Hat Revue =

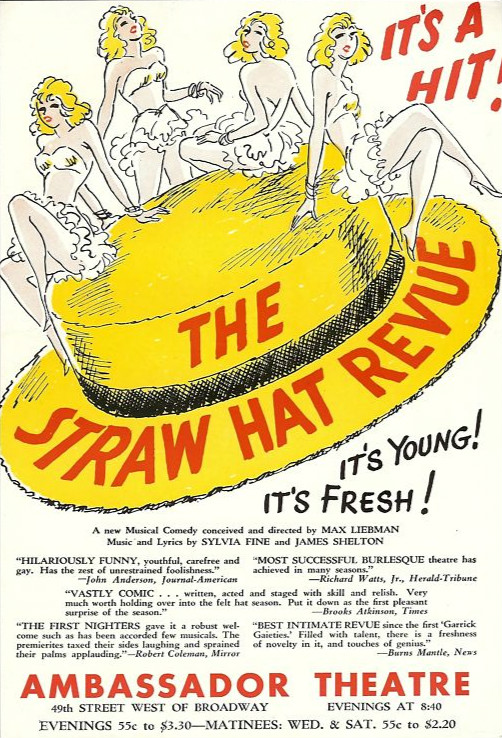
- Poster
- Music: Sylvia Fine and James Shelton
- Lyrics: Sylvia Fine and James Shelton
- Book: Max Liebman and Samuel Locke
- Premiere: Original Broadway Production

The Straw Hat Revue is a musical comedy revue with sketches mostly by Max Liebman and Samuel Locke, and music and lyrics by Sylvia Fine and James Shelton. It was produced on Broadway in 1939.

== Production ==
The Straw Hat Revue started life as a 1939 summer theatre revue at Camp Tamiment, Bushkill, PA. It was discovered by the Broadway producer, Harry Kaufman, and reorganized into a Broadway show produced by Mr. Kaufman and Messrs. Shubert (Lee and J.J.). The Straw Hat Revue premiered on Broadway at the Ambassador Theatre on September 29, 1939, and closed on December 2, 1939, after 75 performances. It was conceived and staged by Max Liebman with choreography by Jerome Andrews, and settings by Edward Gilbert. The orchestra was under the direction of Edward A. Hunt. The cast included Imogene Coca, Danny Kaye, Alfred Drake, Jerome Robbins, Mata & Hari, and James Shelton

== Songs ==
Act I

- “Crashing Thru” (by Sylvia Fine) – Entire Company
- “Four Young People” (by James Shelton) – Alfred Drake, Dorothy Bird, Jerome Andrews, Albia Kavan
- “Anatole of Paris” (by Sylvia Fine) – Danny Kaye and Models
- “Tramping on Life” (by Max Liebman and James Shelton; special music by Glenn Bacon) – Robert Burton, Imogene Coca, James Shelton
- “The Swingaroo Trio” (by Sylvia Fine) – Imogene Coca, Robert Burton, Danny Kaye
- “The Great Chandelier” (by Sylvia Fine) – Robert Burton, Herbert Shepard, James Shelton, Danny Kaye, Imogene Coca, Lee Brody, Boys and Girls

Act II

- “Crazy Cactus” (by Sylvia Fine) – Alfred Drake
- “Our Town” (by James Shelton) – James Shelton and several others
- “Soused American Way” – Alfred Drake
- “Finale” (lyrics by Sylvia Fine) – Entire Company

== Reception ==
Brooks Atkinson of The New York Times said, “. . . a cheerful lark very much worth holding over into the felt hat season. . . . Put it down as the first pleasant surprise of the season. . . . written, acted and staged with skill and relish.”

== Sources ==
- Mantle, Burns (ed.), “The Best Plays of 1939-40”, Dodd, Mead and Company, New York, 1940, p. 400
