= Sol Tolchinsky =

Canadian basketball player (1929–2020)

Solly Tolchinsky (2 January 1929 – 1 December 2020) was a Canadian basketball player who competed in the 1948 Summer Olympics. Born in Montreal, Quebec, he was part of the Canadian basketball team, which finished ninth in the Olympic tournament. His brother was Jewish comedy writer Mel Tolkin.

Tolchinsky died from complications of COVID-19 in Montreal, on 1 December 2020, at the age of 91, during the COVID-19 pandemic in Montreal. He was the son of Nessie Cartman and Mendel "Max" Tolchinsky, a labourer and door-to-door salesman.
