= Happy Times (song) =

Jazz ballad

First sheet of "Happy Times" preserved by the Library of Congress.

"Happy Times" is a jazz ballad written by American lyricist Sylvia Fine. The song was originally created for the 1949 film The Inspector General, which was originally titled Happy Times. Bob Crosby performed the song with his group, the Bob-cats.

== Composition ==
"Happy Times" was created as a ballad with small notes of jazz. The song was an original production by Sylvia Fine (along with two theatrical numbers, “Soliloquy for Three Heads” and “Medicine Show Number”) for the 1949 musical comedy The Inspector General. The song was performed by jazz musician Bob Crosby and his group the Bob-cats.
