= Michael Todd's Peep Show =

Broadway musical revue (1950)

Michael Todd's Peep Show was a 1950 American musical revue produced by Mike Todd, with music by, among others, Jule Styne, Raymond Scott and Bhumibol Adulyadej, the King of Thailand. The book was by comedian Bobby Clark, who did not perform in the show. Peep Show, which opened at Broadway's Winter Garden Theatre on 28 June 1950, was a success, closing on 25 February 1951 after 278 performances. The production was choreographed by James Starbuck.

After the opening performances of Peep Show, the New York City Commissioner of Licenses called a meeting with Todd which led to changes in how the women were presented. In Art Cohn's posthumous biography of Todd, The Nine Lives of Mike Todd, it is revealed that the naked girls featured in the show's mermaid sequence had difficulty getting the blue dye used in the water, out of their pubic hair.

Critic George Jean Nathan wrote that Peep Show emphasized "sex, ferociously".
