= Caesar's Hour =

1954 American television sketch-comedy television program

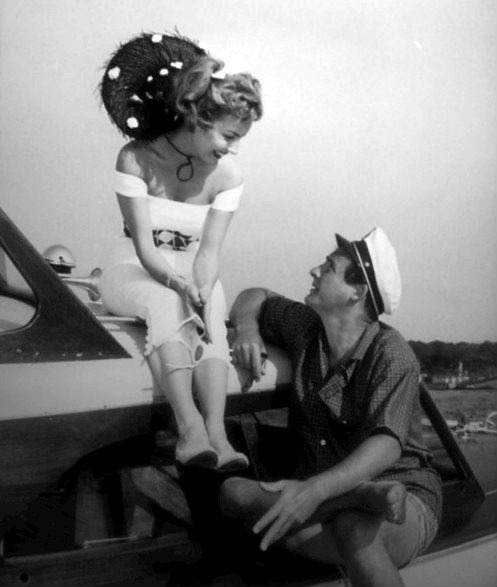
- Janet Blair and Sid Caesar (1956)
- Genre: Sketch comedy
- Directed by: Clark Jones
- Starring: Sid Caesar; Janet Blair; Nanette Fabray; Milt Kamen; Howard Morris; Carl Reiner
- Composers: Sid Caesar; Bernard Green
- Country of origin: United States
- Original language: English
- No. of seasons: 3

Production
- Camera setup: Multicamera
- Running time: 45–48 minutes

Original release
- Network: NBC
- Release: September 27, 1954 – May 25, 1957

Related
- Your Show of Shows

Caesar's Hour is a live, hour-long American sketch-comedy television program that aired on NBC from 1954 until 1957. The program starred, among others, Sid Caesar, Nanette Fabray, Carl Reiner, Howard Morris, Janet Blair, and Milt Kamen, and featured a number of cameo roles by famous entertainers such as Joan Crawford and Peggy Lee.

Widely considered a continuation of Caesar's earlier programs, the Admiral Broadway Revue and Your Show of Shows, Caesar's Hour included most of the same writers and actors, with the notable addition of Larry Gelbart (who went on to co-create the M*A*S*H TV series with Gene Reynolds) in the latter show. Nanette Fabray replaced Imogene Coca, who opted to star in her own TV series in 1954, The Imogene Coca Show.

Caesar's Hour expanded on the format of Your Show of Shows with many sketches running a half-hour or more, including musical parodies such as "There's No Business" and "Towers Trot", and genre parodies such as "Bullets over Broadway" (a gangster film takeoff) and "Aggravation Boulevard" (with Caesar as a Rudolph Valentino/John Gilbert character who fails to make the transition from silents to talkies). Many of the sketches are centered on a domineering star who flames out, prefiguring Caesar's post-series personal and career troubles.

From July to September 1956, NBC ran The Ernie Kovacs Show as a summer replacement series for Caesar's Hour.

The writing staff of the show was reunited in 1996 for an event at the Writers Guild Theater in Los Angeles called Caesar's Hour Revisited, excerpts of which were broadcast on PBS under the title Caesar's Writers. The full two-hour event was available on VHS as a pledge premium from PBS. It was released on DVD for the first time on December 12, 2011. The reunion featured Caesar with Mel Tolkin (head writer), Neil Simon, Danny Simon, Mel Brooks, Carl Reiner, Larry Gelbart, Sheldon Keller, Aaron Ruben, and Gary Belkin. The moderator and researcher was Bob Claster.

== Episode status ==
As with Your Show of Shows, most of the original kinescopes of Caesar's Hour do survive. Complete episodes and segments (of episodes that only exist in partial form) from the series survive at the UCLA Film and Television Archive in Los Angeles and The Paley Center for Media in Manhattan and Beverly Hills, California.
