= Sheldon Keller =

American screenwriter and composer

Sheldon Bernard "Shelly" Keller (August 20, 1923 – September 1, 2008) was an American screenwriter and composer.

== Life and career ==
Keller was born in Chicago and attended University of Illinois, where he began writing comedy with his fraternity brother Allan Sherman. He served in the Pacific Theater with the United States Army Signal Corps during World War II.

After the war, Keller came home and married Bernice "Bitsy" Berkowitz. They had two children, Casey and Jamie. In 1951, he borrowed $500 from his father-in-law and moved the family to New York hoping to become an entertainer and comedian. He soon began writing for television.

On Caesar's Hour, starring Sid Caesar, Keller worked with notable writers Mel Brooks, Carl Reiner, Selma Diamond, Larry Gelbart, Mel Tolkin, Michael Stewart and Gary Belkin. In 1956, 1957 and 1958 the show was nominated for Emmy Award for Best Comedy Writing – Variety or Situation Comedy.

Keller also wrote several episodes of The Dick Van Dyke Show and M*A*S*H, including "For Want of a Boot" and "The Chosen People". His notable screenplays include Buona Sera, Mrs. Campbell (written with Melvin Frank and Denis Norden), which would later become the inspiration for the stage and film musical Mamma Mia!

Keller co-wrote the 1979 film Movie Movie with Gelbart, winning the WGA Award for Best Comedy Written Directly for the Screen. He also wrote the 1973 crime film Cleopatra Jones (with Max Julien).

Keller wrote television specials for Frank Sinatra, Danny Kaye and Carol Channing, winning a 1966 Emmy Award with Hal Goldman and Al Gordon for writing An Evening With Carol Channing.

In the early 1980s, as his writing career was winding down, Keller formed the Beverly Hills Unlisted Jazz Band with friends Conrad Janis and George Segal. Their mix of jazz and comedy made them popular enough to play at Carnegie Hall and on The Tonight Show and led to their own PBS special in 1993, "This Joint Is Jumpin'".

In later life, Keller collaborated with his friend Howard Albrecht on Funny Stuff, a newsletter of jokes for radio DJs and public speakers. Keller died at his home in Valencia, Santa Clarita, California, from complications of Alzheimer's disease.

== Selected filmography ==
- Caesar's Hour (1954–1957) (TV)
- The Art Carney Show (1959) (TV)
- The Dinah Shore Chevy Show (1961) (TV)
- Ensign O'Toole (1962) (TV)
- The Dick Van Dyke Show (1962–1964) (TV)
- An Evening with Carol Channing (1966) (TV)
- Buona Sera, Mrs. Campbell (with Melvin Frank and Denis Norden) (1968)
- The Marty Feldman Comedy Machine (1972) (TV)
- Roll Out (1973) (TV)
- Cleopatra Jones (with Max Julien) (1973)
- M*A*S*H (1973–1974) (TV)
- Movie Movie (with Larry Gelbart) (1978)
- Hizzonner (1979) (TV)
- House Calls (1980) (TV)
- Joan Rivers and Friends Salute Heidi Abromowitz (1985) (TV)
- Side by Side (with Rosemary Edelman) (1988)
