= Michael H. Simon =

American judge (born 1956)

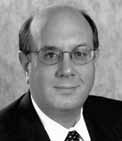

Judge of the United States District Court for the District of Oregon
- Incumbent
- Assumed office June 22, 2011
- Appointed by: Barack Obama
- Preceded by: Ancer L. Haggerty

Personal details
- Born: Michael Howard Simon; December 1, 1956 (age 69) New York City, U.S.
- Spouse: Suzanne Bonamici (m. 1984)
- Children: 2
- Parent(s): Danny Simon; Arlene Friedman
- Relatives: Neil Simon (uncle)
- Education: University of California, Los Angeles (BA); Harvard University (JD)

Michael Howard Simon (born December 1, 1956) is a United States district judge of the United States District Court for the District of Oregon.

== Early life and education ==
Simon was born in New York City in 1956 into a Jewish American family. He was the older of two children born to Danny Simon and Arlene Friedman. Simon's father was a television comedy writer, and his uncle Neil Simon was an acclaimed playwright. Simon earned his Bachelor of Arts, summa cum laude, in 1978 from the University of California, Los Angeles and his Juris Doctor, cum laude, in 1981 from Harvard Law School. He is married to Democratic U. S. Representative Suzanne Bonamici.

== Career ==
From 1981 until 1986, Simon served as a trial attorney at the United States Department of Justice Antitrust Division, in Washington, D.C., where he handled both civil and criminal antitrust matters. During his time with the DOJ, Simon also served in 1985 as a special assistant United States attorney for the Eastern District of Virginia. In 1986, Simon joined the law firm of Perkins Coie, where he specialized in business litigation in both state and federal court and acted as head of litigation for the firm's Portland office. After becoming a partner with the firm in 1990, he handled several high-profile First Amendment cases on a pro bono basis.

=== Federal judicial service ===
On July 14, 2010, President Barack Obama nominated Simon to a seat on the United States District Court for the District of Oregon to fill the seat vacated by Judge Ancer L. Haggerty, who assumed senior status in August 2009. Simon's nomination lapsed at the end of 2010, and Obama renominated him on January 5, 2011. On February 17, 2011, the Senate Judiciary Committee reported Simon's nomination to the full United States Senate by a 14–4 vote. In his committee questionnaire, Simon encountered questions from Republican senators about his past work as a volunteer lawyer for the American Civil Liberties Union. On June 21, 2011, the United States Senate confirmed Simon by a 64–35 vote. He received his commission on June 22, 2011.

=== Notable rulings ===
- On November 2, 2019, Simon issued a temporary restraining order against a Trump administration rule requiring immigrants prove they will have health insurance.
- On July 23, 2020, Simon issued a temporary restraining order preventing federal agents from using force against journalists and legal observers during the George Floyd protests in Portland, Oregon.
- On February 3, 2026, Simon issued a temporary restraining order preventing federal agents from using chemical or projectile munitions against protesters who don't pose any imminent threat of physical harm during the 2025-2026 Portland, Oregon protests at the Portland ICE building.

== See also ==
- List of Jewish American jurists

Legal offices
Preceded by Ancer L. Haggerty	Judge of the United States District Court for the District of Oregon; 2011–present	Incumbent
