= Mary Sinclair =

American actress (1922–2000)

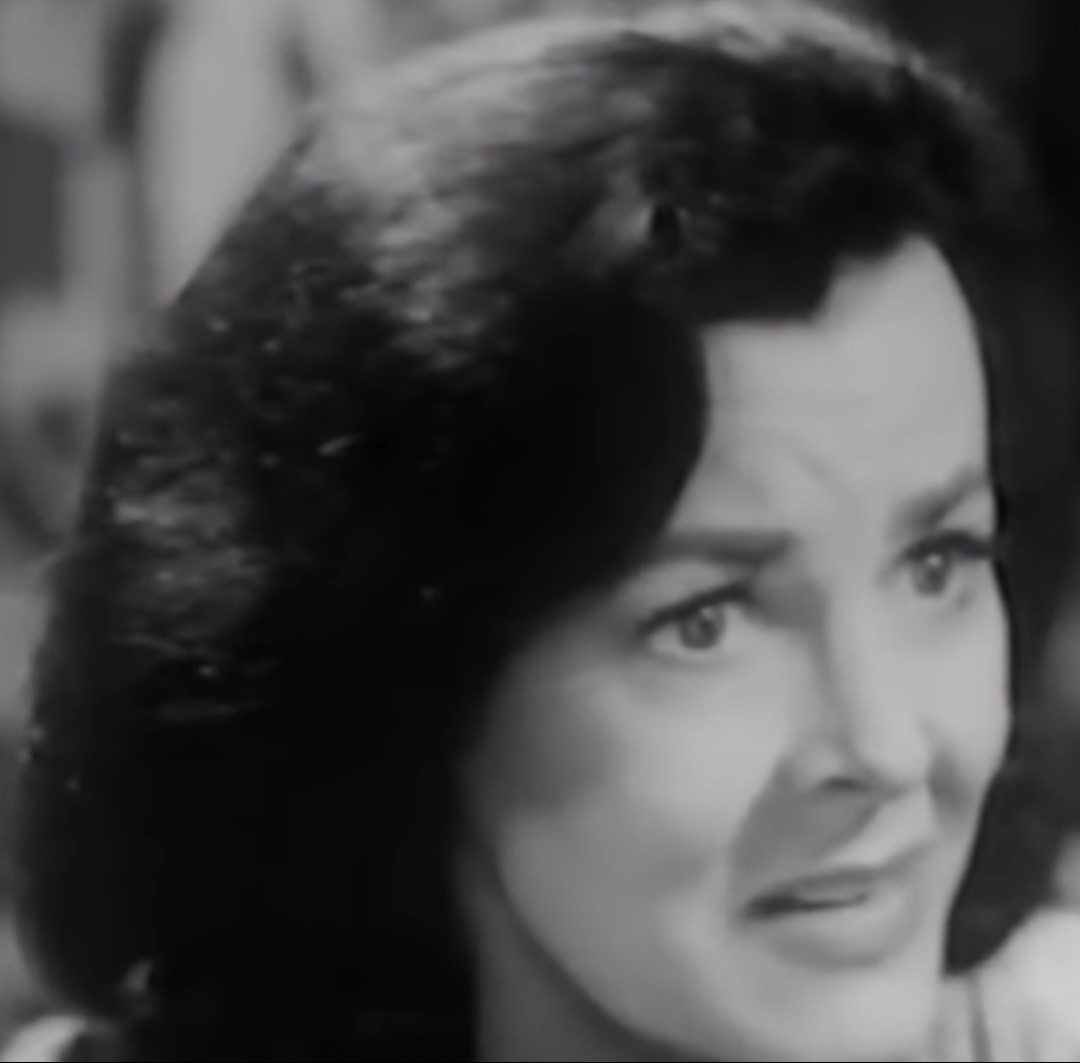
- Sinclair in an episode of One Step Beyond (1961)
- Born: Ella Dolores Cook; November 15, 1922; San Diego, California, U.S.
- Died: November 5, 2000 (aged 77); Phoenix, Arizona, U.S.
- Citizenship: United States
- Occupations: Television, film and stage actress; painter; former Conover model
- Years active: 1949–1987
- Known for: First dramatic actress to be given a long-term television acting contract
- Spouse: George Abbott (m. 1946; div. 1951)
- Children: 2
- Relatives: Candice Bergen (goddaughter)

Mary Sinclair (born Ella Delores Cook; November 15, 1922 – November 5, 2000) was an American television, film and stage actress and “a familiar face to television viewers in the 1950s” as a performer in numerous plays produced and broadcast live during the early days of television. Sinclair was also a painter and had in her youth been a Conover model. Her husband, for a time, was Broadway producer and director, George Abbott.

== Early life and modelling ==
Sinclair was born Ella Delores Cook and raised in San Diego, California. As a young woman she began modelling in Los Angeles, and in 1944, she left Hollywood for Manhattan, where she modelled for the Conover agency and acted in summer stock. "I was the arty type," she recalled in a 1951 interview with The New York Times. "I wanted to go to New York and be a real actress.”

== Acting career ==
In New York City, she became friends with theater producer Hal Prince and theater producer, playwright and director George Abbott, her senior by thirty-five years, whom she married in April 1946 and divorced in 1951. And in the 1940s, she began to acquire experience as a freelance television actress, appearing on 36 programs in two years. But it was CBS board chairman William S. Paley who singled Sinclair out, in 1951, by giving her a seven-year contract with CBS, one of the first acting contracts granted by the network. The New York Times reported that she was the first dramatic actress "to enter video's incubator for hatching its own stars."

=== Television ===
After acting on 36 TV programs in two years as a freelancer, in 1951, Sinclair signed a long-term contract with CBS, becoming the first person to join what an article in The New York Times termed "video's incubator for hatching its own stars."

" Ms. Sinclair usually played sweet, goody-goody characters on television. But not long after signing with CBS, she played quite different parts on three successive evenings: a vicious singer, a spiteful flapper and a libidinous shrew." "She was dazed by the number of men she had to kiss on-screen and said, 'I average two strangers a week.'"

Sinclair starred in the live drama programs popular in the 1950s such as Playhouse 90, Westinghouse Studio One, and The U.S. Steel Hour. She had guest roles on early series including The Untouchables, Peter Gunn, and Woman with a Past. And she starred in productions of Wuthering Heights, The Scarlet Letter and Little Women; also on the Sherlock Holmes television series with British actor, Ronald Howard. On November 14, 1950, Sinclair co-starred in "The Brush Off", an episode of Suspense.

She was nominated for a Primetime Emmy Award in 1951. In total, Sinclair played in more than one hundred and twenty television shows and films during her career.

=== Film ===
The one major motion picture that Mary Sinclair acted in was Arrowhead made in 1953, starring Charlton Heston, Brian Keith and Katy Jurado, with Jack Palance as an Apache chief, in which she played Lela Wilson. Paramount wanted her to appear in other films but she explained that she preferred working in television and returned to New York.

== A shift in focus to painting ==
In the 1960s, as her television career faded, although attending the Actors Studio in Manhattan, headed by Lee Strasberg, and appearing on the stage, Sinclair, in the main, retired from acting, and devoted most of her creative energies to painting. She studied with artist Fleur Cowles and specialized in oil canvases of flowers and animals, and portraits of friends.

== Sojourn in Europe and a return ==
After leaving the U.S. and living in Italy for a few years, in the 1970s she returned to Los Angeles, where she directed local theater productions. Later she moved to Phoenix, Arizona and lived there until her death in 2000 at the age of seventy-seven.

== Filmography ==
Year	Title	Role	Notes
1953	Arrowhead	Lela Wilson	
1974	Alice Goodbody		

== See also ==
- Golden Age of Television
- 4th Primetime Emmy Awards
- Studio One
- Playhouse 90
- CBS
- Memories (The Twilight Zone)
- Sherlock Holmes
- The Web
- List of Tales of the Unexpected episodes
