= Sylvia Fine =

American lyricist and songwriter (1913–1991)

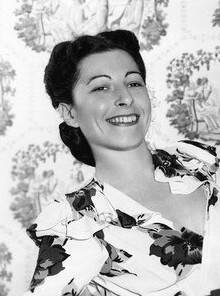
- Fine in 1945
- Born: August 29, 1913; New York City, U.S.
- Died: October 28, 1991 (aged 78); New York City, U.S.
- Occupations: Composer; producer
- Years active: 1934–1991
- Spouse: Danny Kaye (m. 1940; died 1987)
- Children: 1

Sylvia Fine Kaye (August 29, 1913 – October 28, 1991) was an American lyricist, composer, and producer. Many of her compositions and productions were performed by her husband, comedian Danny Kaye. Fine was a Peabody Award-winner and was nominated for two Academy Awards and two Emmys during her career. She won an Emmy award in 1976 for a children's special.

== Early life ==
Sylvia Fine was born in Brooklyn, New York, the youngest of three children of a Jewish dentist, and raised in East New York. She attended Thomas Jefferson High School and studied music at Brooklyn College, where she wrote the music for the school's alma mater, with lyrics from the poet Robert Friend.

== Career and Danny Kaye ==
She was working as an audition pianist when she met Danny Kaye; both were working on a short-lived Broadway show, The Straw Hat Revue. Fine wrote the lyrics and music for the show. Although the pair had never met before, they discovered some things in common. They were both born in Brooklyn, and Kaye had once worked for Fine's father, watching his office while the dentist went to lunch. Dr. Fine had fired his future son-in-law for doing woodworking with his dental drills.

He proposed on the telephone while working in Florida; Fine was in New York. She made the trip to Fort Lauderdale where they were married on January 3, 1940.

She took a direct role in managing her husband's career and wrote many of his songs for him, both in film and recordings. Those for the film The Court Jester were co-written with Sammy Cahn. She was an associate producer of some of the films. Fine received a Peabody Award in 1980, and during her career she was also nominated for two Oscars and two Emmys. She began working in television production with her husband's 1960s television shows.

The New York Times reported, "In the 1970s, [Fine] embarked on a separate career as a television producer and teacher. She began teaching musical comedy at the University of Southern California in 1971 and at Yale in 1975. She produced and narrated the course as a 90-minute PBS program Musical Comedy Tonight (eventually a three-part series), earning her a Peabody Award in 1979.

In 1975 she was executive producer for the television special "Danny Kaye: Look in at the Metropolitan opera."

She produced and edited Assignment Children, a UNICEF film that starred her husband. In the last three years of her life, she had been writing a book about her life with Kaye, Fine and Danny, for Knopf Books.

== Personal life ==
Fine and Kaye had a daughter, Dena (born December 17, 1946). They separated in September 1947, attributing the separation to "two people working very hard." They reunited seven months later, and remained married until his death in 1987. In 1992, her daughter Dena Kaye was quoted in a newspaper article, recalling Fine's advice to her and the influence it had in her life. Both Fine and Kaye were determined not to influence their daughter's choices as she grew up. In a 1954 interview, Kaye stated that "Whatever she (Dena) wants to be she will be without interference from her mother nor from me." Dena grew up to become a journalist.

== Death ==
Sylvia Fine Kaye died of emphysema at the age of 78 in her Manhattan apartment in 1991. She is buried with her husband at Kensico Cemetery in Valhalla, New York.

== Legacy ==
The careers of Fine and Kaye are documented in The Danny Kaye and Sylvia Fine Collection at the Library of Congress. The materials preserved in the collection include manuscripts, scores, scripts, photographs, sound recordings, and video clips.

The Sylvia and Danny Kaye Playhouse at Hunter College in New York opened in 1988, with a $1 million gift from Sylvia Kaye.

== Selected list of Sylvia Fine songs ==
- "Anatole of Paris" from The Secret Life of Walter Mitty (1947)
- "The Inspector General" and "Happy Times" (Johnny Green, Sylvia Fine) from The Inspector General (1949)
- "The Moon Is Blue" (Herschel Burke Gilbert, Sylvia Fine) from The Moon Is Blue (1953) - Oscar nominee, Best Original Song
- "Knock on Wood" from Knock on Wood (1954)
- "(You'll Never) Outfox the Fox" (Sammy Cahn, Sylvia Fine) from The Court Jester (1956)
- "The Five Pennies" from The Five Pennies (1959) - Oscar nominee, Best Original Song
- "Lullaby in Ragtime," also from The Five Pennies
