= Max Liebman =

American theater and television producer (1902–1981)

Max Liebman (August 2, 1902 – July 21, 1981) was a director, producer and writer for both Broadway theater and television.

Sometimes called the "Ziegfeld of TV". he helped establish early television's comedy vocabulary with Your Show of Shows. He additionally helped bring improvisational comedy into the mainstream as the producer of From the Second City, a 1961 Broadway revue that originated from the improvisational comedy troupe The Second City.

== Early life and education ==
Max Liebman was born in Vienna, Austria, and emigrated to the United States during childhood. He attended Boys High School in Brooklyn, New York City. where his extracurricular activities included the debating society and school theater, including shows with classmate Arthur Schwartz, the future Broadway composer.

== Career ==
In 1920, Liebman entered vaudeville as a sketch-comedy writer, and in 1924 or 1925 became social director at Camp Log Cabin or the Log Tavern in Pennsylvania. In 1932, or 1933 he was named theater director at Tamiment, a Pocono Mountains resort, where he would remain for fifteen years.

Concurrently, he made his Broadway theatre debut as a sketch writer, alongside others, including The Little King comic-strip cartoonist Otto Soglow, of the musical revue The Illustrators' Show. It ran five performances, January 22–25, 1936, at the 48th Street Theatre. Undaunted by the short run, he went on to co-write, with Allen Boretz, the comedy play Off to Buffalo, featuring Hume Cronyn. This ran seven performances beginning February 21, 1939, at the Ethel Barrymore Theatre.

Back at the Tamiment Playhouse, Liebman recalled, "I was doing all the writing myself" until 1938, when he began working with Sylvia Fine. Fine introduced Liebman to her future husband, comedian Danny Kaye, whose talent Liebman immediately realized.

He placed Kaye and comedian Imogene Coca in a Tamiment musical, The Straw Hat Revue, which moved to Broadway's Ambassador Theatre on September 29, 1939, where it ran seventy-five performances through December 2. Liebman wrote the musical's book and is credited directorially under "staging". The cast included Coca, Kaye and Jerome Robbins. Yet another Tamiment discovery was Carol Channing, who said of Liebman: "He was the oracle. If he approved, you were in show business."

In 1948, he directed the sketches for the revue, Make Mine Manhattan, starring Sid Caesar in his Broadway theatre debut and later a star of Liebman's Your Show of Shows. Under his longtime guidance, Caesar emerged as one of TV's first superstars, a "comic genius." And as biographer David Margolick has written, "More than anyone else, Max Liebman made Sid Caesar Sid Caesar." Liebman also introduced to Broadway such Poconos performers as Betty Garrett and Jules Munshin, and the choreographer Lee Sherman, with whom he worked on Make Mine Manhattan.
