= Lucille Kallen =

American novelist

- Born: May 28, 1922; Los Angeles, California, U.S.
- Died: January 18, 1999 (aged 76); Ardsley, New York, U.S.
- Occupations: American novelist; screenwriter; composer; lyricist

Lucille Kallen (May 28, 1922, Los Angeles, California – January 18, 1999, Ardsley, New York) was an American writer, screenwriter, playwright, composer, and lyricist. Born in Los Angeles, she moved to Canada at the age of 3 and grew up in Toronto.

She was best known for being one of only two women in the most famous TV writers' room, the one that created Sid Caesar's Your Show of Shows from 1950 to 1954, along with Selma Diamond. She also worked extensively on Broadway, was a long-time writing partner of Mel Tolkin, and published six novels, including a series of mysteries featuring the character C.B. Greenfield. The Mystery Fancier discussed and reviewed her books, and one was quoted in English Historical Syntax and Morphology.

Sid Caesar's writer's room has been fictionally recreated many times. Neil Simon, one of the writers, memorialized it in his play Laughter on the 23rd Floor; it formed the centerpiece of the 1982 film My Favorite Year, and most famously, it was the office in which Rob Petrie worked in The Dick Van Dyke Show. Kallen and Selma Diamond, who were composited to make Rose Marie's character, Sally, were the only women writers on Your Show of Shows and Caesar's follow-up show, Caesar's Hour.

== Bibliography ==
- Outside There, Somewhere!: A Novel (1964) later republished as Gentlemen Prefer Slaves (1973).
- Introducing C.B. Greenfield (1981)
- C.B. Greenfield: The Piano Bird (1984)
- C.B. Greenfield: No Lady in the House (1984)
- C.B. Greenfield: The Tanglewood Murder (1985)
- C.B. Greenfield: A Little Madness (1986)
