= Sid Caesar =

American comic actor and writer (1922–2014)

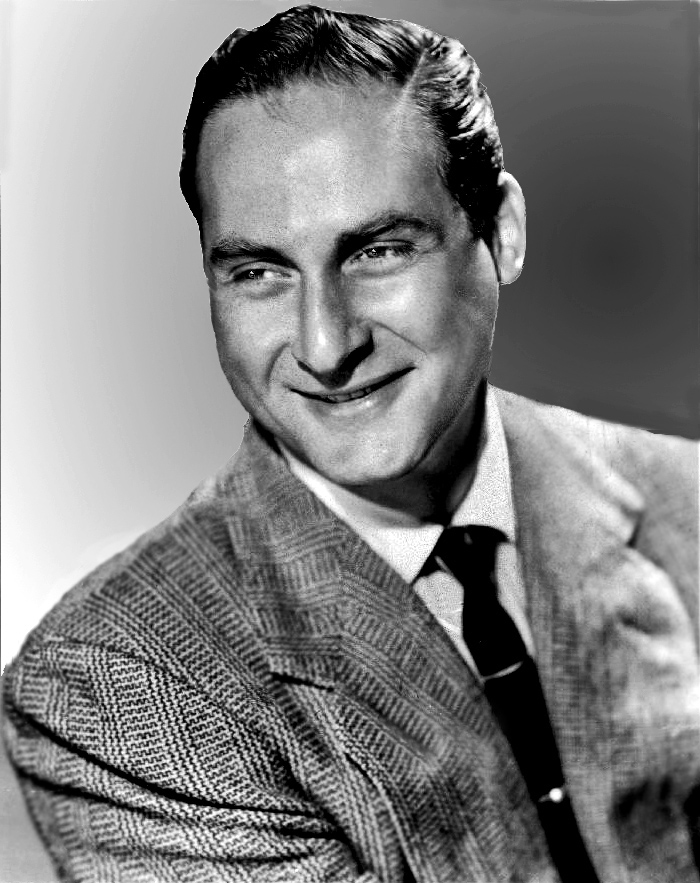
- Caesar in 1961
- Born: Isaac Sidney Caesar; September 8, 1922; Yonkers, New York, U.S.
- Died: February 12, 2014 (aged 91); Beverly Hills, California, U.S.
- Resting place: Mount Sinai Memorial Park
- Occupations: Actor; comedian; writer
- Years active: 1941–2005
- Spouse: Florence Levy (m. 1943; died 2010)
- Children: 3

Isaac Sidney Caesar (September 8, 1922 – February 12, 2014) was an American comic actor and comedian. With a career spanning 60 years, he was best known for two pioneering 1950s live television series: Your Show of Shows (1950–1954), which was a 90-minute weekly show watched by 60 million people, and its successor, Caesar's Hour (1954–1957), both of which influenced later generations of comedians. Your Show of Shows and its cast received seven Emmy nominations between 1953 and 1954 and tallied two wins. He also acted in films; he played Coach Calhoun in Grease (1978) and its sequel Grease 2 (1982) and appeared in the films It's a Mad, Mad, Mad, Mad World (1963), Silent Movie (1976), History of the World, Part I (1981), Cannonball Run II (1984), and Vegas Vacation (1997).

Caesar was considered a "sketch comic" and actor, as opposed to a stand-up comedian. He also relied more on body language, accents, and facial contortions than simply dialogue. Unlike the slapstick comedy which was standard on TV, his style was considered "avant garde" in the 1950s. He conjured up ideas and scene and used writers to flesh out the concept and create the dialogue. Among the writers who wrote for Caesar early in their careers were Mel Brooks, Neil Simon, Larry Gelbart, Carl Reiner, Michael Stewart, Mel Tolkin, Lucille Kallen, Selma Diamond, and Woody Allen. "Sid's was the show to which all comedy writers aspired. It was the place to be," said Steve Allen.

His TV shows' subjects included satires of real life events and people, and parodies of popular film genres, theater, television shows, and opera. Compared to other comedy shows at the time, the dialogue was considered sharper, funnier, and more adult-oriented. He was "best known as one of the most intelligent and provocative innovators of television comedy," who some critics called "television's Charlie Chaplin" and The New York Times refers to as the "comedian of comedians from TV's early days."

Honored in numerous ways over 60 years, he was nominated for 11 Emmy Awards, winning twice. He was also an accomplished saxophonist, having played the saxophone since he was eleven years old, and was the author of several books, including two autobiographies in which he described his career and later struggle to overcome years of alcoholism and addiction to barbiturates.

== Early life ==
Isaac Sidney Caesar was born in Yonkers, New York, to a Jewish family. His father was born Max Ziser (1874–1946) and his mother was Ida (née Raffel; 1887–1975). They were probably from Dąbrowa Tarnowska, Poland. It is often claimed that the surname "Caesar" was given by an immigration official at Ellis Island, but there are no documented cases of names changed at Ellis Island.

Max and Ida ran a restaurant, a 24-hour luncheonette. Being in this environment, their son absorbed the distinct accents, rhythms, and mannerisms of a diverse clientele. He later used these observations to pioneer his signature double-talk technique — a comedic style where he improvised convincing gibberish that perfectly mimicked the sound and feel of real foreign languages, which he used throughout his career. He first tried double-talk with a group of Italians, his head barely reaching above the table. They enjoyed it so much that they sent him over to a group of Poles to repeat his native-sounding patter in Polish, and so on with Russians, Hungarians, Frenchmen, Spaniards, Lithuanians, and Bulgarians. Sid Caesar's older brother, David, was his comic mentor and "one-man cheering section." They created their earliest family sketches from movies of the day like Test Pilot and the 1927 silent film Wings.

As a boy, Caesar took saxophone lessons and played in small bands to make money during the Great Depression. When he was 14, Caesar went to the Catskill Mountains as a tenor saxophonist in the Swingtime Six band and occasionally performed in sketches in the Borscht Belt.

== Career ==
=== Stage and film ===
After graduating from Yonkers High School in 1940, Caesar left home, intent on a musical career. He arrived in Manhattan and worked as an usher and then a doorman at the Capitol Theater. He was ineligible to join the American Federation of Musicians in New York City until he established residency, but he found work as a saxophonist at the Vacationland Hotel, a resort located in the Catskill Mountains of Sullivan County, New York. Mentored by Don Appel, the resort's social director, Caesar played in the dance band and learned to perform comedy, doing three shows a week. He audited classes in clarinet and saxophone at the Juilliard School of Music. In 1940, he enlisted in the United States Coast Guard, and was stationed in Brooklyn, New York, where he played in military revues and shows. Caesar was discharged from the service in 1945. Vernon Duke, the composer of "Autumn in New York", "April in Paris", and "Taking a Chance on Love", was at the same base and collaborated with Caesar on musical revues.

During the summer of 1942, Caesar met his future wife, Florence Levy, at the Avon Lodge in the Catskills village of Woodridge, New York. They were married on July 17, 1943, and had three children: Michele, Rick and Karen. After joining the musicians' union, he briefly played with Shep Fields, Claude Thornhill, Charlie Spivak, Art Mooney and Benny Goodman. Later in his career, he performed "Sing, Sing, Sing" with Goodman for a TV show.

Still in the military, Caesar was ordered to Palm Beach, Florida, where Vernon Duke and Howard Dietz were putting together a service revue called Tars and Spars. There he met the civilian director of the show, Max Liebman. When Caesar's comedy got bigger applause than the musical numbers, Liebman asked him to do stand-up bits between the songs. Tars and Spars toured nationally, and became Caesar's first major gig as a comedian. Liebman later produced Caesar's first television series.

After finishing his military service in 1945, the Caesars moved to Hollywood. In 1946, Columbia Pictures produced a film version of Tars and Spars in which Caesar reprised his role. The next year, he acted in The Guilt of Janet Ames. He turned down the lead of The Jolson Story as he did not want to be known as an impersonator, and turned down several other offers to play sidekick roles. He soon returned to New York, where he became the opening act for Joe E. Lewis at the Copacabana nightclub. He reunited with Liebman, who guided his stage material and presentation. That job led to a contract with the William Morris Agency and a nationwide tour. Caesar also performed in a Broadway revue, Make Mine Manhattan, which featured The Five Dollar Date—one of his first original pieces, in which he sang, acted, double-talked, pantomimed, and wrote the music. He won a 1948 Donaldson Award for his contributions to the musical.

=== Television ===
Caesar's television career began with an appearance on Milton Berle's Texaco Star Theater in the fall of 1948. In early 1949, Caesar and Liebman met with Pat Weaver, vice president of television at NBC, which led to Caesar's first series, Admiral Broadway Revue with Imogene Coca. The Friday show was simultaneously broadcast on NBC and the DuMont network, and it was an immediate success. However, its sponsor, Admiral, an appliance company, could not keep up with the demand for its new television sets, so the show was canceled after 26 weeks—ironically, on account of its runaway success.

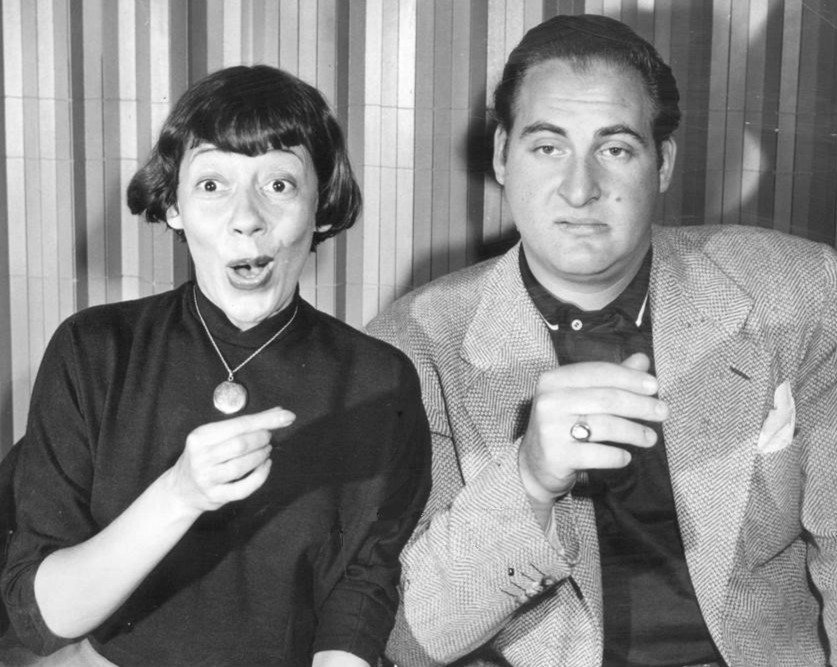
Imogene Coca and Caesar in Your Show of Shows (1952)

On February 25, 1950, Caesar appeared in the first episode of Your Show of Shows, initially the second half of the two-hour umbrella show Saturday Night Review; at the end of the 1950–51 season, Your Show of Shows became its own, 90-minute program from the International Theatre at 5 Columbus Circle and later The Center Theatre at Sixth Avenue and 49th Street. Burgess Meredith hosted the first two shows, and the premiere featured musical guests Gertrude Lawrence, Lily Pons and Robert Merrill. The show was a mix of sketch comedy, movie and television satires, Caesar's monologs, musical guests, and large production numbers. Guests included: Jackie Cooper, Robert Preston, Rex Harrison, Eddie Albert, Michael Redgrave, Basil Rathbone, Charlton Heston, Geraldine Page, Douglas Fairbanks Jr., Pearl Bailey, Fred Allen, Benny Goodman, Lena Horne and many other stars of the time. It was also responsible for bringing together the comedy team of Caesar, Coca, Carl Reiner, and Howard Morris. Many writers also got their break creating the show's sketches, including Lucille Kallen, Mel Brooks, Neil Simon, Michael Stewart, Mel Tolkin and Sheldon Keller. Sid Caesar won his first Emmy in 1952. In 1951 and 1952, he was voted the United States' Best Comedian in Motion Picture Daily's TV poll. The show ended after almost 160 episodes on June 5, 1954.

A few months later, Caesar returned with Caesar's Hour, a one-hour sketch/variety show with Morris, Reiner, Bea Arthur and other members of his former crew. Nanette Fabray replaced Coca, who had left to star in her own short-lived series. Ultimate creative and technical control was now in Caesar's hands, originating from the Center Theater and the weekly budget doubled to $125,000. The premiere on September 27, 1954, featured Gina Lollobrigida. Everything was performed live, including the commercials.

Caesar's Hour was followed by ABC's short-lived Sid Caesar Invites You from January 26 to May 25, 1958. It briefly reunited Caesar, Coca, and Reiner, with Simon and Brooks among the writers.

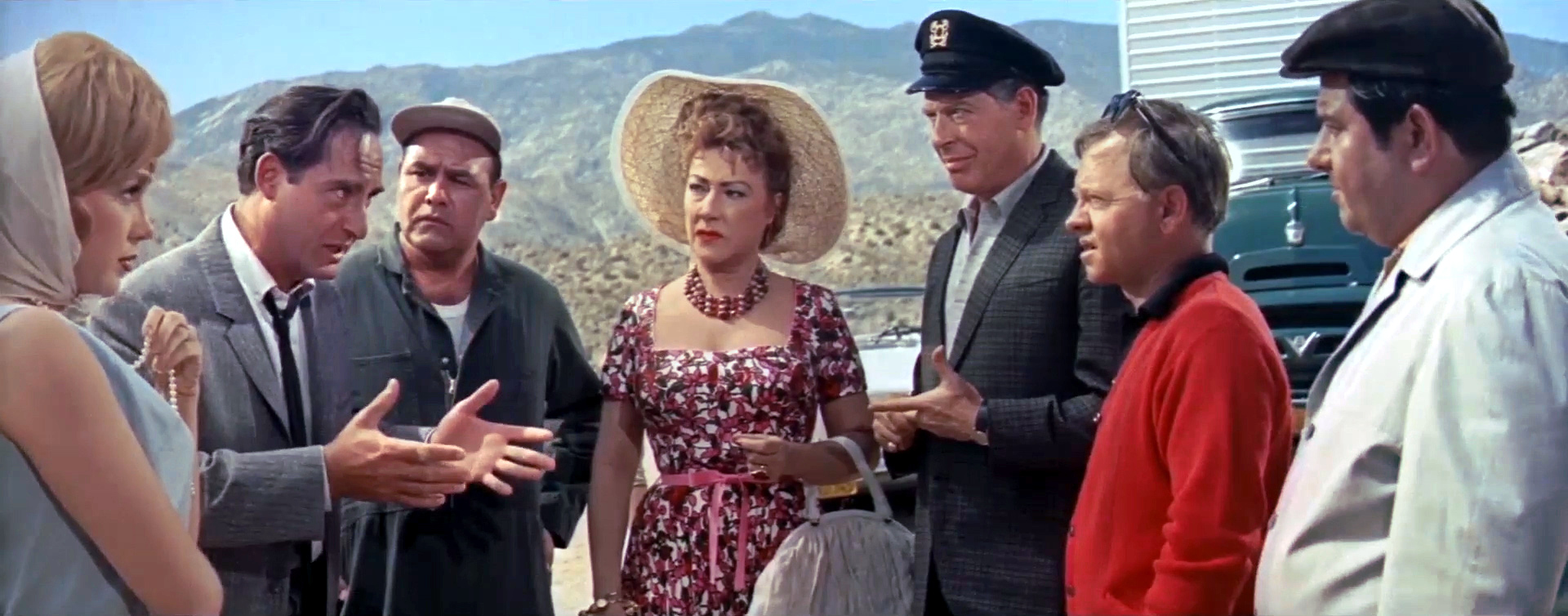
L–R: Edie Adams, Caesar, Jonathan Winters, Ethel Merman, Milton Berle, Mickey Rooney and Buddy Hackett in It's a Mad, Mad, Mad, Mad World

In 1963, Caesar appeared on television, on stage, and in films. Several As Caesar Sees It specials evolved into the 1963–64 Sid Caesar Show (which alternated with Edie Adams in Here's Edie). He starred with Virginia Martin in the Broadway musical Little Me, with book by Simon, choreography by Bob Fosse, and music by Cy Coleman. Playing eight parts with 32 costume changes, he was nominated in 1963 for a Tony Award for Best Leading Actor in a Musical. On film, Caesar and Adams played a husband and wife drawn into a mad race to find buried loot in Stanley Kramer's comedy ensemble It's a Mad, Mad, Mad, Mad World (1963) which became a box office success and earned six Academy Award nominations.

=== Style and technique ===
Caesar was not a stand-up comedian but a "sketch comic, and actor," wrote one historian. "He conjured up ideas and enhanced scenes, but never wrote a word," and thereby depended on his writers for dialogue. Caesar was skilled at pantomime, dialects, monologs, foreign language double-talk and general comic acting.

Caesar in 1972

His sketches were often long, sometimes 10 or 15 minutes, with numerous close-ups showing the expressions on the faces of Caesar and other actors. Caesar relied more on body language, accents, and facial contortions than simply spoken dialogue. Unlike slapstick comedy, which was standard on TV, his style was considered avant garde. Caesar "...was born with the ability to write physical poetry," notes comedian Steve Allen, a technique like that used for a silent film comedian. An example of this "silent film" style is a live sketch with Nanette Fabray, where they both pantomime an argument choreographed to the music of Beethoven's Fifth Symphony.

Writer Mel Tolkin stated that Caesar "didn't like one-line jokes in sketches because he felt that if the joke was a good one, anybody could do it. One-liners would take him away from what drove his personal approach to comedy." Larry Gelbart called Caesar's style theatrical, and called him "...a pure TV comedian." In describing his control during the live performances, actress Nanette Fabray recalled that unlike most comedians, such as Red Skelton, Bob Hope or Milton Berle, Caesar always stayed in character: "He was so totally into the scene he never lost it."

Caesar was able to pantomime a wide variety of things: a tire, a gumball machine, a lion, a dog, a punching bag, a telephone, an infant, an elevator, a railroad train, a herd of horses, a piano, a rattlesnake and a bottle of seltzer. On the Dick Clark show in 1978, he played a chewing gum machine and a slot machine. He was also able to create imaginary characters. Alfred Hitchcock compared him to Charlie Chaplin, and critic John Crosby felt "he could wrench laughter out of you with the violence of his great eyes and the sheer immensity of his parody." In an article in The Saturday Evening Post in 1953, show business biographer Maurice Zolotow noted that "Caesar relies upon grunts and grimaces to express a vast range of emotions."

Of his double-talk routines, Carl Reiner said, "His ability to doubletalk every language known to man was impeccable," and during one performance Caesar imitated four different languages but with almost no real words. Despite his apparent fluency in many languages, Caesar could actually speak only English and Yiddish. In 2008, Caesar told a USA Today reporter, "Every language has its own music ... If you listen to a language for 15 minutes, you know the rhythm and song." Having developed this mimicry skill, he could create entire monologs using gibberish in numerous languages, as he did in a skit in which he played a German general.

=== Subjects ===
Among his primary subjects were parodies and spoofs of various film genres, including gangster films, westerns, newspaper dramas, spy movies and other TV shows. Compared to other comedy shows at the time, the dialogue on his shows was considered sharper, funnier and more adult oriented. In his sketches for Your Show of Shows and Caesar's Hour, he would also typically "skewer the minutiae of domestic life" along with lampooning popular or classic movies.

Contemporary movies, foreign movies, theater, television shows and opera were targets of satire by the writing team. Often the publicity generated by the sketches boosted the box office of the original productions. Some notable sketches included: "From Here to Obscurity" (From Here to Eternity), "Aggravation Boulevard" (Sunset Boulevard), "Hat Basterson" (Bat Masterson), and "No West for the Wicked" (Stagecoach).

They also performed some recurring sketches. "The Hickenloopers", television's first bickering-couple sketch, predated The Honeymooners. As "The Professor", Caesar was the daffy expert who bluffed his way through his interviews with earnest roving reporter Carl Reiner. In its various incarnations, "The Professor" could be Gut von Fraidykat (mountain-climbing expert), Ludwig von Spacebrain (space expert), or Ludwig von Henpecked (marriage expert). Later, "The Professor" was inspiration for Mel Brooks' "The Two Thousand Year Old Man". The most prominent recurring sketch on the show was "The Commuters", which featured Caesar, Reiner, and Morris involved with everyday working and suburban life situations. Years later, the sketch "Sneaking through the Sound Barrier", a parody of the British film The Sound Barrier, ran continuously as part of a display on supersonic flight at the National Air and Space Museum in Washington, D.C.

=== Working with writers ===
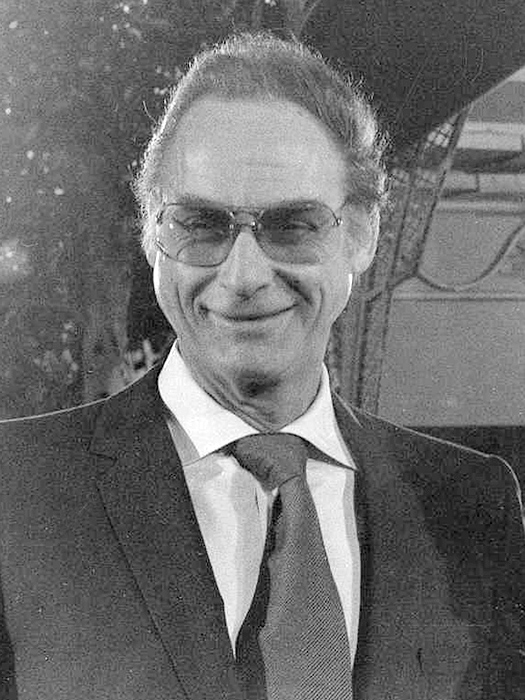
Caesar in 1980

Steve Allen claimed, "Sid's was the show to which all comedy writers aspired. It was the place to be." While Caesar did not write his dialogue, he made all final decisions. His writers, such as Mel Brooks, felt they "had a great instrument in Caesar that we could all play, and we played it very well." As for Caesar, Nachman describes him basically as an "inspired idea man who allowed the writers to take more risks" than other TV shows. Woody Allen remembers that "...you wrote situations," instead of jokes, as in "This Is Your Story" with Carl Reiner, a parody of the popular TV show This Is Your Life. That April 1954 sketch was said to be "Caesar's personal favorite." Even more, though it aired seventy-two years ago, it's claimed to have "produced what is probably the longest and loudest burst of laughter—genuine laughter, neither piped in nor prompted—in the history of television."

In many cases, sketch dialogue was not even written down, but simply indicated by describing a scene, as in, "Sid does man coming home from business mad." Sometimes, said Larry Gelbart, it was "organized chaos," and when watching the writers create from offstage, felt, "...it was a religious experience." To Mel Brooks, "it was a zoo. Everyone pitched lines at Sid. Jokes would be changed fifty times." Naturally there were some explosive episodes: "Mr. Caesar once dangled a terrified Mr. Brooks from an 18th-story window until colleagues restrained him. With one punch, he knocked out a horse that had thrown his wife off its back, a scene that Mr. Brooks replayed in his movie Blazing Saddles."

Neil Simon recalled that after writing out a sketch and giving it to Caesar, "Sid would make it ten times funnier than what we wrote. Sid acted everything out, so the sketches we did were like little plays." Simon also remembered the impact that working for Caesar had on him: "The first time I saw Caesar it was like seeing a new country. All other comics were basically doing situations with farcical characters. Caesar was doing life."

Some of his writers, like Woody Allen, initially didn't like being among the large team of writers coming up with routines for Caesar, feeling it was too competitive and contributed to hostility among writers. An Allen biographer wrote that Allen "...chafed under the atmosphere of inspired spontaneity", although Allen did say that, "Writing for Caesar was the highest thing you could aspire to—at least as a TV comedy writer. Only the presidency was above that." Neil Simon noted that "we were competitive the way a family is competitive to get dad's attention. We all wanted to be Sid's favorite." As part of the competitive atmosphere in The Writer's Room, as it was called, friendship was also critical. Larry Gelbart explained:

We were able to be urbane. Between us we read every book. Between us we saw every movie. Between us we saw every play on Broadway. You could make jokes about Kafka or Tennessee Williams. We also had dinner together. We went to movies together. We were all friends. And that was very important. We appreciated each other a lot.

=== Impact on television ===
Nachman concludes that "the Caesar shows were the crème de la crème of fifties television," as they were "studded with satire, and their sketches sharper, edgier, more sophisticated than the other variety shows." Likewise, historian Susan Murray notes that Caesar was "...best known as one of the most intelligent and provocative innovators of television comedy."

According to actress Nanette Fabray, who acted alongside Caesar, "He was the first original TV comedy creation." His early shows were the "...gold standard for TV sketch comedy." In 1951, Newsweek noted that according to "the opinion of lots of smart people, Caesar is the best that TV has to offer," while Zolotow, in his 1953 profile for The Saturday Evening Post, wrote that "in temperament, physique, and technique of operation, Caesar represents a new species of comedian."

However, his positive impact on television became a negative one for Broadway. Caesar fans preferred to stay home on Saturday nights to watch his show instead of seeing live plays. "The Caesar show became such a Saturday-night must-see habit—the Saturday Night Live of its day," states Nachman, that "...Broadway producers begged NBC to switch the show to midweek." Comedy star Carol Burnett, who later had her own hit TV show, remembers winning tickets to see My Fair Lady on Broadway: "I gave the tickets to my roommate because I said, Fair Lady's gonna be running for a hundred years, but Sid Caesar is live and I'll never see that again."

=== Faded success and personal problems ===
After nearly 10 years as a prime-time star of television comedy with Your Show of Shows followed by Caesar's Hour, his stardom ended rapidly and he nearly disappeared from the spotlight. Nachman describes this period:

Caesar slid into a personal and career abyss ... [he] had no interest in movies ... He would live and die by the tube. His career was short-circuited by alcohol and pills ... The pressures of sudden stardom, of headlining and co-producing a weekly hit show, crushed him.

Caesar himself felt, "It had all come too fast, was too easy, and he didn't deserve the acclaim." Writer Mel Brooks, who also became his close friend, said, "I know of no other comedian, including Chaplin, who could have done nearly ten years of live television. Nobody's talent was ever more used up than Sid's. He was one of the greatest artists ever born. But over a period of years, television ground him into sausages."

In 1977, after blacking out during a stage performance of Neil Simon's The Last of the Red Hot Lovers in Regina, Saskatchewan, Caesar gave up alcohol "cold turkey". In his 1982 autobiography, Where Have I Been?, and his second book, Caesar's Hours, he chronicled his struggle to overcome his alcoholism and addiction to sleeping pills.

=== Later years ===
Throughout the 1970s and 1980s, Caesar continued to make occasional television and theatrical appearances and starred in several movies including Silent Movie and History of the World, Part I (both reuniting him with Mel Brooks), Airport 1975, and as Coach Calhoun in Grease and its sequel Grease 2 in 1982. In 1971, he starred opposite Carol Channing and a young Tommy Lee Jones in the Broadway show Four on a Garden.

In 1973, Caesar reunited with Imogene Coca for the stage play The Prisoner of Second Avenue, written in 1971 by Neil Simon. Their play opened in Chicago in August 1973. That same year, Caesar and Max Liebman mined their own personal kinescopes from Your Show of Shows (NBC had lost the studio copies) and they produced the feature film Ten From Your Show of Shows, a compilation of some of their best sketches. In 1974, Caesar said, "I'd like to be back every week" on TV and appeared in the NBC skit-based comedy television pilot called Hamburgers.

Caesar as guest on The Big Show with host Steve Allen in 1980

In 1980, he appeared as a double-talking Japanese father for Mei and Kei's Pink Lady and opposite Jeff Altman in the Pink Lady and Jeff show.

In 1983, Caesar hosted an episode of Saturday Night Live, where he received a standing ovation at the start of the show and was awarded a plaque at the conclusion of the show declaring him an honorary cast member. He released an exercise video, Sid Caesar's Shape Up!, in 1985. In 1987–89, Caesar appeared as Frosch the Jailer in Die Fledermaus at the Metropolitan Opera in New York. In 1987, Caesar starred in the David Irving film The Emperor's New Clothes with Robert Morse as the Tailor. Caesar remained active by appearing in movies, television and award shows, including the movie The Great Mom Swap in 1995.

In 1996, the Writers Guild of America, West reunited Caesar with nine of his writers from Your Show of Shows and Caesar's Hour for a two-hour panel discussion featuring head writer Mel Tolkin, Caesar, Carl Reiner, Aaron Ruben, Larry Gelbart, Mel Brooks, Neil Simon, Danny Simon, Sheldon Keller, and Gary Belkin. The event was taped, broadcast on PBS in the United States and the BBC in the UK, and later released as a DVD titled Caesar's Writers.

In 1997, he made a guest appearance in Vegas Vacation and, the following year, in The Wonderful Ice Cream Suit based on a Ray Bradbury novel. Also that year, Caesar joined fellow television icons Bob Hope and Milton Berle at the 50th anniversary of the Primetime Emmy Awards. Billy Crystal also paid tribute to Caesar that night when he won an Emmy for hosting that year's Oscar telecast, recalling seeing Caesar doing a parody of Yul Brynner in The King & I on Your Show of Shows. Caesar performed his double-talk in a "foreign dub" skit on the November 21, 2001, episode of Whose Line Is It Anyway?

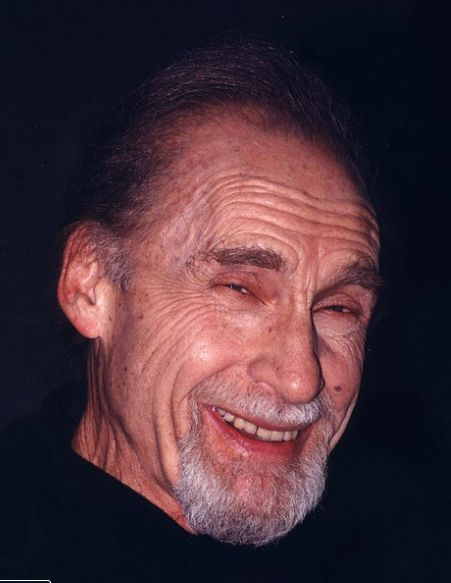
Caesar attending Mark Twain Prize for American Humor in 2000

On September 7, 2001, Caesar, Carl Reiner and Nanette Fabray appeared on CNN's live interview program Larry King Live along with actor, comedian and improvisationist Drew Carey.

In 2003, he joined Edie Adams and Marvin Kaplan at a 40th anniversary celebration for It's a Mad, Mad, Mad, Mad World. In 2004, Caesar's second autobiography, Caesar's Hours, was published, and in 2006, Billy Crystal presented Caesar with the TV Land Awards' Pioneer Award. In what TV Land called "...a hilarious, heartfelt, multilingual, uncut acceptance speech," Caesar performed his double-talk for over five minutes.

In a November 2009 article in the Toluca Lake, California, Tolucan Times, columnist Greg Crosby described a visit with Caesar and his wife Florence at their home. Of the couple's meeting, Florence said, "Well, I thought he was nice for the summer ... I thought he would be just a nice boyfriend for the summer. He was cute-looking and tall, over six feet.... I was in my last year at Hunter College; we were still dating when Sid went into the service, the Coast Guard. Luckily he was stationed in New York so we were able to continue seeing each other, even though my parents weren't too happy about it. They never thought he would amount to anything, that he'd never have a real career or make any money. But we were married one year after we met, in July of 1943." She also pointed out, "You know, he's not funny all the time. He can be very serious." At the time of the interview, the couple had been married for 66 years. Florence Caesar died on March 3, 2010, aged 88.

== Personal life ==
Caesar was married to Florence Levy for 67 years until her death in 2010. Caesar asserted that he was "proud to be Jewish" and that "Jews have a good sense of humor. Jews appreciate humor because in their life it's not too funny. We've been trodden down for a long time, thousands of years. So we've had to turn that around because if you take it all too seriously you're going to eat yourself. And we're very good at being self-deprecating. Either we do it or somebody's going to do it for us. We might as well do it first."

== Death ==
Caesar died on February 12, 2014, at his home in Beverly Hills, California, at the age of 91, after a short illness.

On Caesar's death, Carl Reiner said, "He was the ultimate, he was the very best sketch artist and comedian that ever existed." Mel Brooks commented, "Sid Caesar was a giant, maybe the best comedian who ever practiced the trade. And I was privileged to be one of his writers and one of his friends." And as Brooks very often said: "No Sid Caesar, no Mel Brooks." Woody Allen stated, "He was one of the truly great comedians of my time". Jon Stewart and The Daily Show paid tribute to Caesar at the show's close on February 12, 2014. Vanity Fair republished a brief tribute written by Billy Crystal in August 2005, in which he said of Caesar and his contemporaries:

I get nervous when I am with these giants. I always feel like I want to say, Thank you. I am blessed to have grown up in their time of perfection, to have witnessed the utter force of Sid. Live, uncut, daring but not risqué. Never stooping beneath themselves, Sid and this team of icons put forth a raucous, hilarious, and truthful brand of comedy that, 50 years later, is still funny and inspiring, and makes me think ... What kind of comedy would I be doing if I hadn't seen Sid Caesar? Would I be a comedian at all?

Yet, Mel Brooks, a major source in David Margolick's 2025 biography, while highly praising it, also sadly warned in its epigraph, "People are going to say...'Just one question...Who's Sid Caesar?' You're going to get that. 'Who was Sid Caesar.'"

His interment was at Mount Sinai Memorial Park Cemetery. He was predeceased by his wife, Florence (2010) and survived by his children Karen, Michelle, and Rick, and two grandsons. His son, Dr. Richard (Rick) Caesar died several months after his father on July 16, 2014.

== Filmography ==
=== Film ===
Year	Title	Role	Notes
1946	Tars and Spars	Chuck Enders	
1947	The Guilt of Janet Ames	Sammy Weaver	
1963	It's a Mad, Mad, Mad, Mad World	Melville Crump	
1966	The Mouse That Roared	Duchess / Mountjoy / Tully	Television film
1967	The Busy Body	George Norton	
1967	A Guide for the Married Man	Man at Romanoff's	
1967	The Spirit Is Willing	Ben Powell	
1968	The Lucy Show. Lucy and Sid Caesar	Himself	
1973	Ten from Your Show of Shows	Unknown	Also writer
1974	Airport 1975	Barney	
1976	Silent Movie	Studio Chief	
1977	Flight to Holocaust	George Beam	Television film
1977	Fire Sale	Sherman	
1977	Curse of the Black Widow	Lazlo Cozart	Television film
1978	The Cheap Detective	Ezra Dezire	
1978	Grease	Coach Calhoun	
1978	Barnaby and Me	Leo Fisk	Television film
1980	The Fiendish Plot of Dr. Fu Manchu	Joe Capone	
1980	Thanksgiving in the Land of Oz	Wizard / U.N. Krust	Voice
1981	The Munsters' Revenge	Dr. Dustin Diablo	Television film
1981	History of the World: Part I	Chief Caveman	
1982	Grease 2	Coach Calhoun	
1984	Over the Brooklyn Bridge	Uncle Benjamin	
1984	Cannonball Run II	Fisherman No. 2	
1985	Love Is Never Silent	Mr. Petrakis	Television film
1985	Alice in Wonderland	The Gryphon	Television film
1986	Stoogemania	Doctor Fixyer Mindyer	
1986	Christmas Snow	Snyder	Television film
1987	The Emperor's New Clothes	The Emperor	
1988	Freedom Fighter	Max	Television film
1988	Side by Side	Louis Hammerstein	Television film
1995	The Great Mom Swap	Papa Tognetti	
1997	Vegas Vacation	Mr. Ellis	
1998	The Wonderful Ice Cream Suit	Sid Zellman	
2000	Globehunters	Jacob	Voice; Television film
2004	Comic Book: The Movie	Old Army Buddy	(final film role)

=== Television ===
Year	Title	Role	Notes
1949	Admiral Broadway Revue	Regular Performer	19 episodes
1950–54	Your Show of Shows	Himself (Regular Performer)	139 episodes
1954	Producers' Showcase	Napoleon Bonaparte / Himself	Episode: "Dateline"
1954–1957	Caesar's Hour	Himself (Host)	70 episodes
1958	Sid Caesar Invites You	Himself	13 episodes
1958	The All-Star Christmas Show	Himself	Television special
1959	Some of Manie's Friends	Himself	Television special
1959	The United States Steel Hour	Unknown	2 episodes
1961	General Electric Theater	Nick Lucifer	Episode: "The Devil You Say"
1961	Checkmate	Johnny Wilder	Episode: "Kill the Sound"
1962	As Caesar Sees It	Himself	Television special
1963–1964	The Sid Caesar Show	Himself (Host)	
1966–1970	The Hollywood Palace	Himself (Host)	
1965–1973	The Dean Martin Show	Himself	4 episodes, also composer
1967	The Sid Caesar, Imogene Coca, Carl Reiner, Howard Morris Special	Himself (Co-host)	Television special
1967	The Carol Burnett Show	Himself	Season 1, episodes 2 & 14
1967	The Danny Thomas Hour	Gregory	Episode: "Instant Money"
1968	That Girl	Marty Nickels	Episode: "The Drunkard"
1969–1971	Love, American Style	Bert / John Smith	2 episodes
1975	When Things Were Rotten	Marquis de la Salle	Episode: "The French Dis-connection"
1976	Good Heavens	Herman Meltzer	Episode: "Herman Meltzer"
1978	Vega$	The General	Episode: "Mother Mishkin"
1978–1984	The Love Boat	Bert Multon / Michael Harmon	2 episodes
1979	Intergalactic Thanksgiving	King Goochi	Voice; television special
1981	The Misadventures of Sheriff Lobo	The Bomber	Episode: "Another Day, Another Bomb"
1982	Matt Houston	Prince Sergei Polansky	Episode: "Recipe for Murder"
1983	Saturday Night Live	Host	Episode: "#8.12"
1985	Amazing Stories	Lou Bundles	Episode: "Mr. Magic"
1986	Sesame Street	Himself	Episode: "#18.19"
1995	Love & War	Mr. Stein	2 episodes
1997	Life with Louie	Marty Kazoo	Voice
1997	Mad About You	Uncle Harold	Episode: "Citizen Buchman"
2001	Whose Line Is It Anyway?	Himself	Season 4 Episode 15

== Awards and nominations ==
Year	Award	Category	Project	Result	Ref..
1948	Donaldson Award	Male Debut in a Musical	—N/a	Won	
1951	Primetime Emmy Award	Most Outstanding Personality	—N/a	Nominated	
1951	Primetime Emmy Award	Best Actor	—N/a	Nominated	
1951	Look magazine	Best Comedian on TV	—N/a	Won	
1952	Primetime Emmy Award	Best Actor	—N/a	Won	
1952	Primetime Emmy Award	Best Comedian or Comedienne	—N/a	Nominated	
1953	Primetime Emmy Award	Best Comedian	—N/a	Nominated	
1954	Primetime Emmy Award	Best Male Star of Regular Series	Your Show of Shows	Nominated	
1956	Primetime Emmy Award	Best Comedian	—N/a	Nominated	
1956	Look magazine	Best Comedian on TV	—N/a	Won	
1957	Primetime Emmy Award	Best Actor in a Comedy Series	Caesar's Hour	Won	
1958	Primetime Emmy Award	Best Actor in a Comedy Series	Caesar's Hour	Nominated	
1963	Tony Award	Best Actor in a Musical	Little Me	Nominated	
1987	British Comedy Awards	Lifetime Achievement Award in Comedy	—N/a	Honored	
1995	Primetime Emmy Award	Outstanding Guest Actor - Comedy Series	Love & War	Nominated	
1997	Primetime Emmy Award	Outstanding Guest Actor - Comedy Series	Mad About You	Nominated	
2001	Television Critics Association	Career Achievement Award	—N/a	Honored	
2006	TV Land Award	Pioneer Award	—N/a	Honored	
2011	Television Critics Association	Lifetime Achievement Award	—N/a	Honored	

=== Honors ===
- 1960: Caesar was awarded a star on the Hollywood Walk of Fame
- 1985: Caesar was inducted into the Television Academy Hall of Fame

In 2005, The Humane Society of the United States honored Caesar by establishing the "Sid Caesar Award for Television Comedy" among the Genesis Awards given annually to individuals in major news and entertainment media who produce outstanding works that raise public awareness of animal issues. In announcing the 2014 Genesis Award winners on February 14, 2014, the Society paid special homage to Caesar, whom the Society credited as one of its most dedicated supporters.
