= Gary Belkin =

American television writer

- Born: April 24, 1926 or 1927; The Bronx, New York, U.S.
- Died: July 28, 2005; West Hollywood, California, U.S.
- Occupation: Television writer
- Years active: 1954–1996

Gary Belkin (April 24, 1926 or 1927 – July 28, 2005) was an American television writer. He won two Primetime Emmy Awards and was nominated for six more in the category Outstanding Writing for his work on the television programs Caesar's Hour, The Danny Kaye Show, The Doris Mary Anne Kappelhoff Special, The Carol Burnett Show and The Tonight Show Starring Johnny Carson. Reportedly, Belkin also wrote some of Muhammad Ali's "lesser doggerel."
