= Your Show of Shows =

American variety television program (1950-1954)

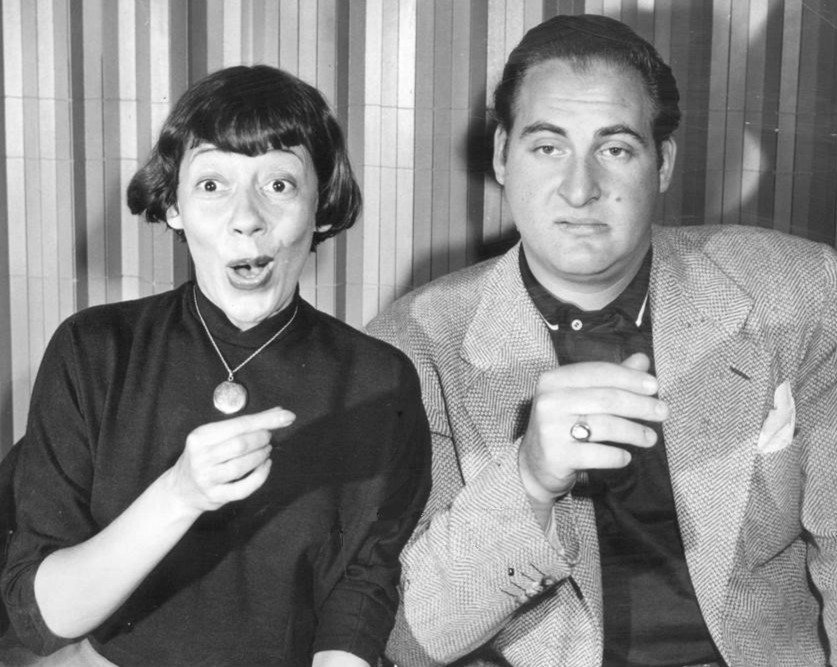
- Imogene Coca and Sid Caesar in 1952
- Genre: Variety show
- Created by: Sylvester L. Weaver Jr.
- Directed by: Bill Hobin; Max Liebman
- Creative director: Charles Sanford (music)
- Starring: Sid Caesar; Imogene Coca; Howard Morris; Carl Reiner; James Starbuck
- Narrated by: Ed Herlihy (announcer)
- Theme music composer: Mel Tolkin; Clay Warnick; Max Liebman
- Opening theme: "Stars Over Broadway"
- Composers: Bernard Green; Irwin Kostal; Johnny Mandel; Alex North
- Country of origin: United States
- Original language: English
- No. of seasons: 4
- No. of episodes: 160

Production
- Producer: Max Liebman
- Camera setup: Multi-camera
- Running time: 90 minutes
- Production company: Max Liebman Productions

Original release
- Network: NBC
- Release: February 25, 1950 – June 5, 1954

Your Show of Shows is a live, 90-minute, variety show that was broadcast weekly in the United States on NBC from February 25, 1950, through June 5, 1954, featuring Sid Caesar and Imogene Coca. Other featured performers were Carl Reiner, Howard Morris, Bill Hayes, baritone singer Jack Russell, Judy Johnson, the Hamilton Trio, and soprano Marguerite Piazza. José Ferrer made several guest appearances on the series.

The show has been featured in several lists of the greatest television series. Most of the series has been preserved to some extent, but only some sketches have been released on home video.

After the program ended, Imogene Coca starred in The Imogene Coca Show (which lasted one season), and Sid Caesar starred in Caesar's Hour, which retained many of the cast and staff of Your Show of Shows.

== Production ==
The 90-minute, live series was produced by Sylvester "Pat" Weaver and directed by Max Liebman, who had been producing musical revues at the Tamiment resort in the Pocono Mountains for many years prior. Caesar, Coca, and Liebman had worked on Admiral Broadway Revue from January to June 1949.

Your Show of Shows originated as the second half of a two-and-a-half-hour umbrella package, Saturday Night Revue, with the one-hour first portion (The Jack Carter Show) hosted by comedian Jack Carter in Chicago, Illinois, and the remainder telecast from the since-demolished International Theatre (also known as the Park Theatre) at 5 Columbus Circle and the Center Theatre in Manhattan, New York City. The Jack Carter portion moved to New York for the 1950–51 season, and then was dropped, with The All-Star Revue becoming the new Saturday night companion to Your Show of Shows.

Writers for the series included Mel Brooks, Neil Simon, Danny Simon, Mel Tolkin, Lucille Kallen, Selma Diamond, Joseph Stein, Michael Stewart, Tony Webster (the only Gentile among the show's writers), and Carl Reiner, who though a cast member, also worked with the writers. The series is historically significant for the evolution of the variety genre by incorporating situation comedies (sitcoms) such as the running sketch "The Hickenloopers"; this added a narrative element to the traditional multiact structure. James Starbuck was the resident choreographer for the show, and he often appeared as a featured dancer opposite Coca in parodies of classic ballets of his creation.

As author Ted Sennett described them, stars Caesar, Coca, Reiner, and Howard Morris

appeared in a series of superbly written sketches that poked fun at human foibles and pretensions. Alone onstage, Caesar would depict a befuddled Everyman trying to cope with life, or a blustering Germanic "professor" being interviewed at an airport and vainly trying to conceal his abysmal stupidity. Alone onstage (or with a partner), Imogene Coca would make us laugh at a passion-ridden torch singer, or a daffy ballerina, or a sweet, wistful tramp. Together, Caesar and Coca would take us through the hilarious marital tribulations of Doris and Charlie Hickenlooper, or show us two strangers exchanging clichés when they meet for the first time.

Coca recalled,

There was a special chemistry to Your Show of Shows, I think, because [producer-director] Max [Liebman] wasn't afraid to throw out material at the last minute. And I think when you do live television — well, we stopped for nothing. We had no cue cards, no TelePrompTers, and no ad-libbing on the air, because Max would have died if anybody had ad-libbed. It would have been utter disgrace, and you would have been drummed right out of the corps. ... Nobody ever forgot a line, and that was the amazing part of it.

A common misconception is that Larry Gelbart wrote for Your Show of Shows; in fact, he wrote for its successor program, Caesar's Hour, which was broadcast from 1954 to 1957. Likewise, Woody Allen did not write for Your Show of Shows, as he only worked on several Sid Caesar TV series and specials from 1956 forward.

Carl Reiner has stated that the time he spent on Your Show of Shows was the inspiration for The Dick Van Dyke Show. Your Show of Shows also inspired the 1982 movie My Favorite Year produced by Mel Brooks and the 1993 play Laughter on the 23rd Floor written by Neil Simon.

The series was noted for its array of glamorous dancers, including Joy Langstaff, Pauline Goddard, and Virginia Curtis.

By the 1953–1954 season, although the ratings had slipped a little, Your Show of Shows remained extremely popular with viewers. However, in the spring of 1954, network management decided to break up the comedy team of Caesar and Coca, and beginning in the fall of 1954, sign them to star in their own individual variety series on NBC. As a result, Your Show Of Shows ended its network run on June 5, 1954. At the end of that episode, NBC president "Pat" Weaver came out at the curtain call to congratulate the cast on their four-year, four-month run and personally to wish Caesar and Coca great success in their future endeavors.

The summer replacement for Your Show of Shows in 1953 and 1954 was Saturday Night Revue.

== Sketches ==
The show featured several regular musical sketches, such as the mock rock group the Three Haircuts (Caesar, Reiner, and Morris), a vocal trio who always sang in unison and usually bellowed the lyrics. In 1955, RCA Victor recorded and rush-released two songs from the show, "You Are So Rare to Me" and "Goin' Crazy", accompanied by Joe Reisman and his orchestra.

== Preservation ==
The kinescopes of the series were retained by Max Liebman; from those shows, a 1973 theatrical film titled Ten from Your Show of Shows was compiled, which featured 10 sketches. In 1976, this was followed by a half-hour syndicated series.

The Paley Center for Media in Manhattan and Beverly Hills holds an almost complete set of the series and a set of master tapes of the 1976 syndicated series.

In 2000, a cache of original scripts from the show was found in a closet of producer Max Liebman, in the City Center building in New York City. The find made the front page of The New York Times. A former employee of Liebman, Barry Jacobsen, told The New York Times he had left the scripts in the closet and was holding onto the key until he could come back to decide how to dispose of them.

== Syndication and DVD release ==
Reruns of the 1976 syndicated "best of" series were aired on Comedy Central during the early 1990s. Skits from the series from Sid Caesar's personal collection are available on The Sid Caesar Collection DVD set.

== Reception ==
=== Peak ratings ===
- 1950–1951: #4
- 1951–1952: #8
- 1952–1953: #19

=== Best-of lists ===
In 2002, Your Show of Shows was ranked number 30 on TV Guide's 50 Greatest TV Shows of All Time. In 2013, it was ranked number 37 on TV Guide's 60 Best Series of All Time. In 2007, TIME placed Your Show of Shows on its unranked list of "100 Best TV Shows of All-TIME." In 2013, Your Show of Shows was ranked #10 on Entertainment Weekly’s Top 100 Greatest TV Shows of All Time. In 2013, the Writers Guild of America ranked Your Show of Shows number 41 on its list of the "101 Best Written TV Series of All Time."
