= Selma Diamond =

Canadian writer and actress (1920–1985)

- Diamond in 1961
- Born: August 5, 1920; London, Ontario, Canada
- Died: May 13, 1985 (aged 64); Los Angeles, California, U.S.
- Resting place: Hillside Memorial Park, Culver City
- Education: New York University
- Occupations: Comedian; actress; writer
- Years active: 1943–1985

Selma Diamond (August 5, 1920 – May 13, 1985) was a Canadian and American comedienne, actress, and radio and television writer, known for her high-range, raspy voice and her portrayal of Selma Hacker on the first two seasons of the NBC television comedy series Night Court. Diamond was also the main inspiration for the character of Sally Rogers on the series The Dick Van Dyke Show.

== Early life ==
Diamond was born on August 5, 1920, in London, Ontario, Canada, to a tailor and his wife. Diamond's grandmother was a suffragette. When Diamond was a young girl, they moved to Brooklyn, New York.

Diamond attended high school in Brooklyn and graduated from New York University.

== Career ==
Diamond published cartoons and humor essays in The New Yorker. Later, she moved to the West Coast and hired an agent. She worked in radio and, eventually, television. Her first radio writing credit was in 1943 on Blue Ribbon Town with Groucho Marx. That initial credit turned into a 65-week tenure with Marx's show and a longer friendship with him. She also wrote for the Camel Caravan with Jimmy Durante and Garry Moore, The Drene Show with Rudy Vallee, Duffy's Tavern, and The Kenny Baker Show.

Diamond wrote for the radio version of The Adventures of Ozzie and Harriet for 20 weeks. She left that show in 1950 and became one of the staff hired by comedy writer Goodman Ace (who had previously hired her for some work on Danny Kaye's 1940s radio show) for The Big Show (1950–1952), the 90-minute weekly program hosted by actress Tallulah Bankhead. In 1951-1952, Diamond collaborated with cartoonist Gill Fox, writing for his "Jeanie" comic strip that ran daily in the New York Herald Tribune.

Diamond moved to television as one of the writers for Sid Caesar and Imogene Coca's Your Show of Shows. While writing for another Caesar vehicle, Caesar's Hour, Diamond earned an Emmy nomination. She also worked for Ace once again, writing for Perry Como's Kraft Music Hall television series. In 1961, Diamond said about being the only female in a group of five writers for the Como show: "They feel handicapped, not me." At another time, she said, "It's like being Red China. I'm there. They just don't recognize me." Carl Reiner said that he had Diamond in mind when he created Sally Rogers as a character in The Dick Van Dyke Show.

In 1953, she wrote for Milton Berle's TV show. In 1960, she released a comedy album based on her humorous conversational style, Selma Diamond Talks...and Talks and Talks and Talks... (Carleton LPX 5001). In 1970, she wrote the book Nose Jobs for Peace, published by Prentice-Hall (ISBN 9780136238270).

By the 1960s and 1970s, Diamond was familiar as a frequent guest on The Jack Paar Show and The Tonight Show Starring Johnny Carson, and she made numerous film appearances, including Stanley Kramer's comedy It's a Mad, Mad, Mad, Mad World (as the unseen telephone voice of Spencer Tracy's wife, Ginger Culpepper), Bang the Drum Slowly (as hotel switchboard operator Tootsie), and All of Me (as Margo). In 1982, she appeared in My Favorite Year with a memorable small role as wardrobe mistress for King Kaiser's Comedy Calvalcade, a fictional show which clearly echoed the time and venue of her work for Sid Caesar. She was also a semi-regular for four seasons of the Ted Knight comedy series Too Close For Comfort.

In addition to her writing, Diamond performed as an actress, making her debut in a summer touring version of Bye, Bye Birdie. Her other work in summer stock productions included Come Blow Your Horn and Barefoot in the Park. On television, she portrayed Selma Hacker on Night Court in 1984 and 1985 for which she received her second Emmy nomination.

== Death ==
Diamond died of lung cancer on May 13, 1985, at Cedars-Sinai Medical Center in Los Angeles, aged 64, with no known family members.

She is buried in Hillside Memorial Park in Culver City.

== Filmography ==
=== Film ===
Year	Title	Role	Notes
1963	It's a Mad, Mad, Mad, Mad World	Ginger Culpeper	Voice
1973	Bang The Drum Slowly	Tootsie	
1982	My Favorite Year	Lil	
1983	Lovesick	Harriet Singer, M.D.	
1983	Twilight Zone: The Movie	Mrs. Weinstein	Segment: "Kick the Can"
1984	All of Me	Margo	

=== Television ===
Year	Title	Role	Notes
1963	Jackie Gleason: American Scene Magazine	American Scene Magazine Reporter	Episode: "#1.17"
1972	Arnie	Selma	Episode: "Wilson Tastes Like a Good Candidate Should"
1972	McMillan & Wife	Gas Station Attendant	Episode: "An Elementary Case of Murder"
1972	Magic Carpet	Mrs. Vogel	Television Film
1977	The Edge of Night	Mrs. Yoast	Unknown Episodes
1978	Flying High	Woman in beauty salon	Episode: "Swan Song for an Ugly Duckling"
1980 - 1984	Too Close for Comfort	Mildred Rafkin	08 Episodes
1983	Archie Bunker's Place	Mrs. Isaacson	Episode: "Three Women"
1983	The Other Woman	Aunt Jeanette	Television Film
1983	Nine to Five	Selma	Episode: "The Phantom"
1983	Trapper John, M.D.	Martha	Episode: "What a Difference a Day Makes"
1984	The Ratings Game	Francine's Mother	Television Film (voice only)
1984 - 1985	Night Court	Bailiff Selma Hacker / Selma Hacker	36 Episodes
1985	The Jetsons	Di Di	Episode: "Elroy in Wonderland" (voice)
1989	Night Court	Bailiff Selma Hacker	Archive Footage / Episode: "Clip Show: Part 1"
