= Imogene Coca =

American comic actress (1908–2001)

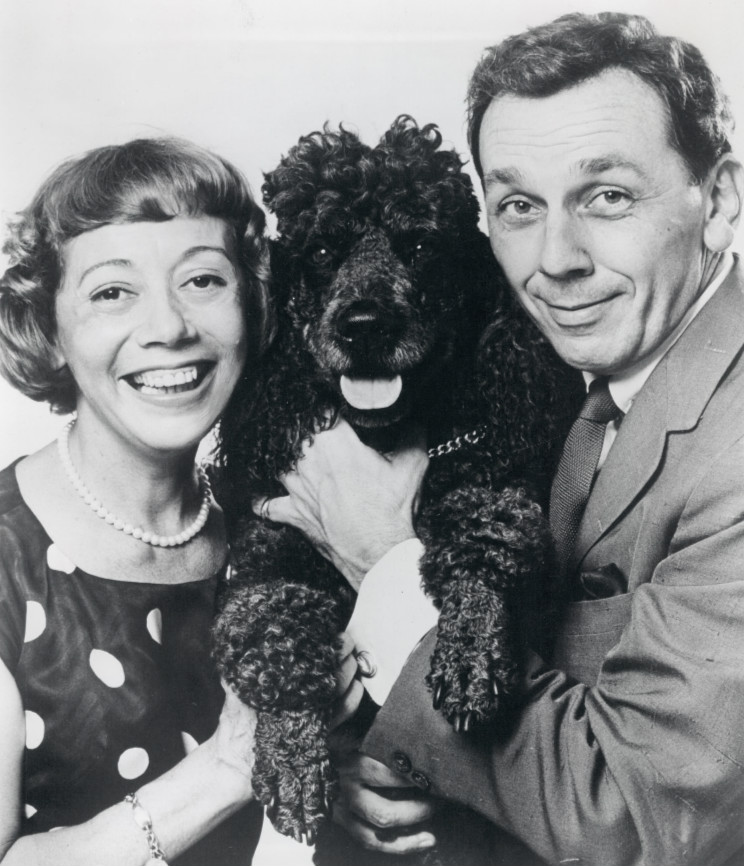
- Coca (left) with her husband King Donovan in 1968
- Born: Emogeane Coca; November 18, 1908; Philadelphia, Pennsylvania, U.S.
- Died: June 2, 2001 (aged 92); Westport, Connecticut, U.S.
- Occupation: Actress
- Years active: 1925–1996
- Spouses: Robert Burton (m. 1935; died 1955) King Donovan (m. 1960; died 1987)

Imogene Coca (born Emogeane Coca; November 18, 1908 – June 2, 2001) was an American comic actress best known for her role opposite Sid Caesar on Your Show of Shows. Starting out in vaudeville as a child acrobat, she studied ballet and pursued a serious career in music and dance, graduating to decades of stage musical revues, cabaret, and summer stock. In her 40s, she began a celebrated career as a comedian on television, starring in six series and guest-starring on successful television programs from the 1940s to the '90s.

She was nominated for five Emmy Awards for Your Show of Shows, winning Best Actress in 1951 and singled out for a Peabody Award for excellence in broadcasting in 1953. Coca was also nominated for a Tony Award in 1978 for On the Twentieth Century and received a sixth Emmy nomination at the age of 80 for an episode of Moonlighting.

She possessed a "rubbery" face capable of the broadest expressions — Life magazine compared her to Beatrice Lillie and Charlie Chaplin and described her characterizations as taking "people or situations suspended in their own precarious balance between dignity and absurdity, and push(ing) them over the cliff with one single, pointed gesture". The magazine noted a "particularly high-brow critic" as observing "The trouble with most comedians who try to do satire is that they are essentially brash, noisy, and indelicate people who have to use a sledge hammer to smash a butterfly. Miss Coca, on the other hand, is the timid woman who, when aroused, can beat a tiger to death with a feather". Aside from vaudeville, cabaret, film, theater, and television, she voiced children's cartoons and was even featured in the 1984 MTV music video "Bag Lady" by the band EBN-OZN, ultimately working well into her 80s. In a 1999 interview, Robert Ozn said that during the shoot, she was required to sit on the sidewalk in snow for hours during a blizzard with 15-degree (F) temperatures. "While the rest of us 20-somethings were moaning about the weather, warming ourselves by a heater, this little 75-year-old lady never once complained — put us all to shame. She was the most professional artist I've ever worked with".

== Early life ==
Imogene Coca was born Emogeane Coca in Philadelphia in 1908 to a Spanish family. She was the only child of Joseph F. Coca Jr. (his surname was originally Fernández y Coca), a violinist and vaudeville orchestra conductor, and Sarah "Sadie" Brady, a dancer and magician's assistant. During her childhood, she took lessons in piano, dance, and voice as a child and moved from Philadelphia to New York City during her teenage years to become a dancer. In 1925, she got her first job in the chorus of the Broadway musical When You Smile. She became a headliner in Manhattan nightclubs with music arranged by her first husband, Bob Burton.

She gained prominence when she combined music with comedy; her first critical success was in New Faces of 1934. A well-received part of her act was a comic striptease, during which Coca made sultry faces and gestures but would manage to remove only one glove. She committed this routine to film in the Educational Pictures comedy short The Bashful Ballerina (1937). She received excellent notices for her Educational short Dime a Dance. In a review headlined "Swell Comic Scores", Film Daily wrote: "A real comedienne who will wow the cash customers with her zany antics, Imogene Coca is in a class all by herself, and her style of comedy does not suggest that of any other funster on the screen". Three other newcomers to films — Danny Kaye, June Allyson, and Barry Sullivan — were featured in the short, filmed at Educational's New York studio.

== Television ==
Coca was one of network television's first comics. She starred in an early ABC series, Buzzy Wuzzy, which lasted four episodes in 1948. She played opposite Sid Caesar on The Admiral Broadway Revue (January to June 1949), and then in the sketch comedy program Your Show of Shows (1950 to 1954), which was immensely popular, winning the Emmy for Outstanding Variety Series in 1952 and 1953. The 90-minute show was aired live on NBC every Saturday night in prime time. In addition to performing with Caesar on this program, she frequently starred in parodies of classic ballets opposite dancer and choreographer James Starbuck. She won the second-ever Primetime Emmy Award for Best Actress in 1952 (before genre-specific acting categories were created) and was nominated for four other Emmys for her work in the show. She won a 1953 Peabody Award for excellence in broadcasting. The Caesar-Coca partnership might have continued, but the network tried to generate more revenue by spinning off Coca into her own series. The Imogene Coca Show ran for one year (1954 to 1955).

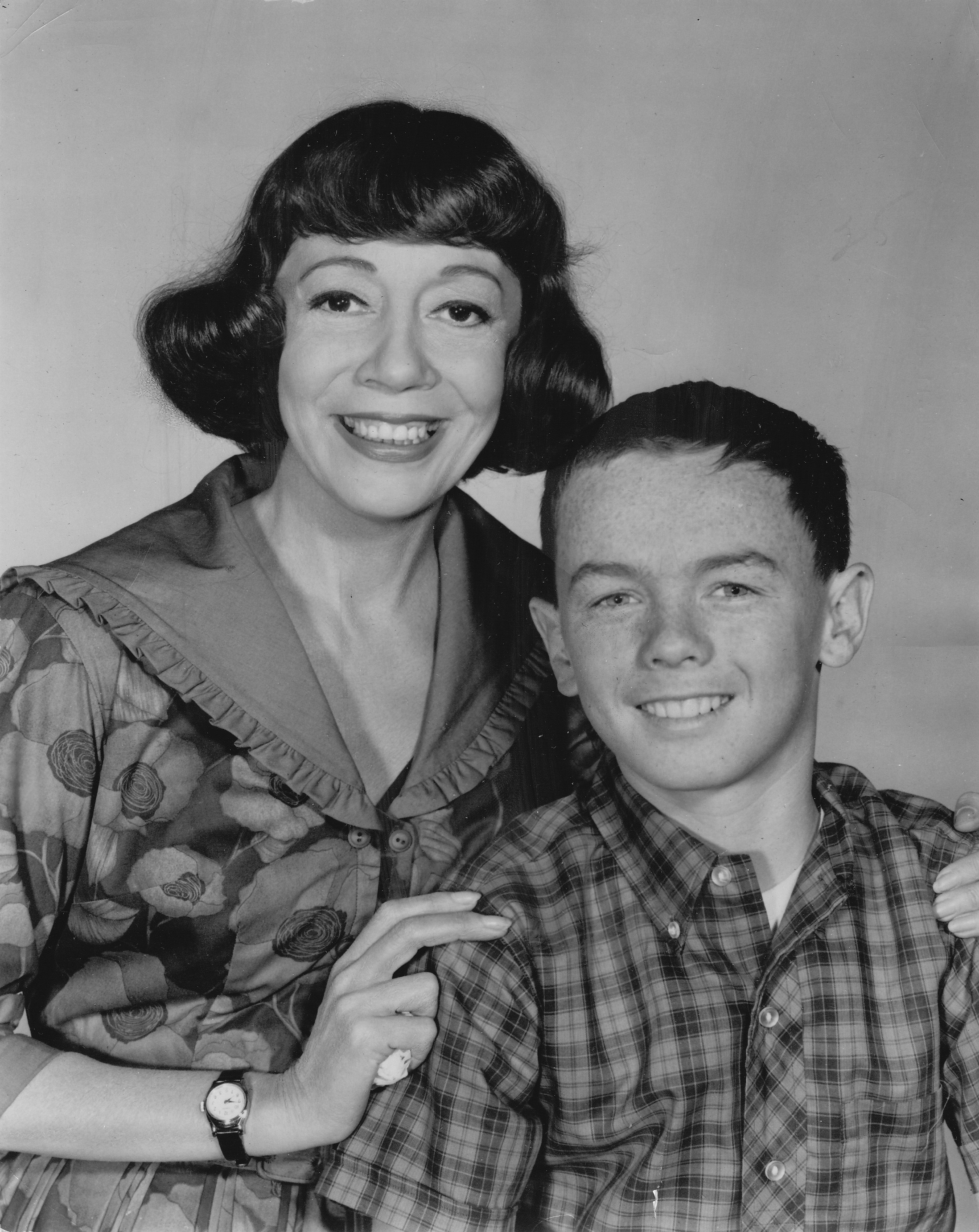
With Billy Booth in the NBC comedy series Grindl, circa 1964.

In 1963 and 1964, Coca portrayed a comic temporary helper in the NBC sitcom Grindl. It competed with the second half of The Ed Sullivan Show and lasted only one season. Coca later starred as a cavewoman with Joe E. Ross in the 1966–67 time-travel satire sitcom It's About Time.

She continued to appear on comedy and variety series from the 1950s to the 1980s, including several appearances each on The Carol Burnett Show, The George Gobel Show, The Hollywood Palace, Ed Sullivan's Toast of the Town, and Bob Hope specials. She appeared on other shows and specials by Dean Martin, Jackie Gleason, Jerry Lewis, Dick Clark, Danny Kaye, and Andy Williams. The Sid Caesar, Imogene Coca, Carl Reiner, and Howard Morris Special won a 1967 Emmy for Outstanding Variety Special. She made memorable guest appearances on sitcoms, including appearances on Bewitched, The Brady Bunch, and Mama's Family. She appeared with Milton Berle and Your Show of Shows co-star Howard Morris in "Curtain Call", a 1983 episode of Fantasy Island.

Coca appeared in a number of literary adaptations for children. In 1960, she was Miss Clavel in Sol Saks' adaptation of Ludwig Bemelmans' Madeline for Shirley Temple's Storybook. In 1972, she voiced the character of Princess Jane Klockenlocher in The Enchanted World of Danny Kaye, a Rankin/Bass version of Hans Christian Andersen's The Emperor's New Clothes. In 1978, she appeared in A Special Sesame Street Christmas. In 1985, she played The Cook in Alice in Wonderland, an all-star TV miniseries adaptation of the book by Lewis Carroll. Among her final roles was voicing characters in Garfield and Friends.

In 1988, Coca appeared as the mother of Allyce Beasley's Agnes in the Moonlighting episode "Los Dos Dipestos", written by David Steinberg. She received her sixth Emmy nomination, as Outstanding Guest Performer in a Drama Series, for the role. The same year she was the female recipient of the Lifetime Achievement Award in Comedy at the second annual American Comedy Awards, alongside male recipient George Burns.

Coca appeared only sporadically in films such as The Incredible Incident at Independence Square, filmed in her hometown of Philadelphia, as well as Under the Yum Yum Tree (1963), Nothing Lasts Forever, Papa Was a Preacher, Buy & Cell, and National Lampoon's Vacation (1983) as Aunt Edna.

After having appeared in several Broadway musical comedy revues and plays between the 1930s and the 1950s, Coca returned to Broadway at the age of 70 with a Tony Award-nominated performance as religious zealot Letitia Primrose in On the Twentieth Century, a 1978 stage musical adapted from the film Twentieth Century (1934). Her role, that of a religious fanatic who plasters decals onto every available surface, had been a male in both the film and the original stage production, and was rewritten specifically as a vehicle for Coca. She appeared in the Broadway run with Kevin Kline and Madeline Kahn, continued with the national tour starring Rock Hudson and Judy Kaye, and returned for a later tour revival in the mid-1980s with Kaye and Frank Gorshin. She also co-starred with singer Maxine Sullivan in My Old Friends and touring productions, including musicals such as Once Upon a Mattress and Bells Are Ringing and plays such as The Prisoner of Second Avenue and Luv. She rejoined Sid Caesar in 1961–62, 1977, and 1990–91 for a traveling stage revue and made an appearance with Caesar and Howard Morris at Comic Relief VI in 1994.

One of Coca's early stock characters on the Caesar series blended comedy with socially conscious pathos as a bag lady and she was frequently asked to reprise the role, including by Carol Burnett for her '60s series and by Red Skelton as love interest to one of his own familiar characters in the 1981 TV special Freddie the Freeloader's Christmas Dinner. New wave group Ēbn-Ōzn featured Coca as the title character in the music video to their song "Bag Lady (I Wonder)", which was a top-40 dance hit in 1984.

== Personal life and legacy ==
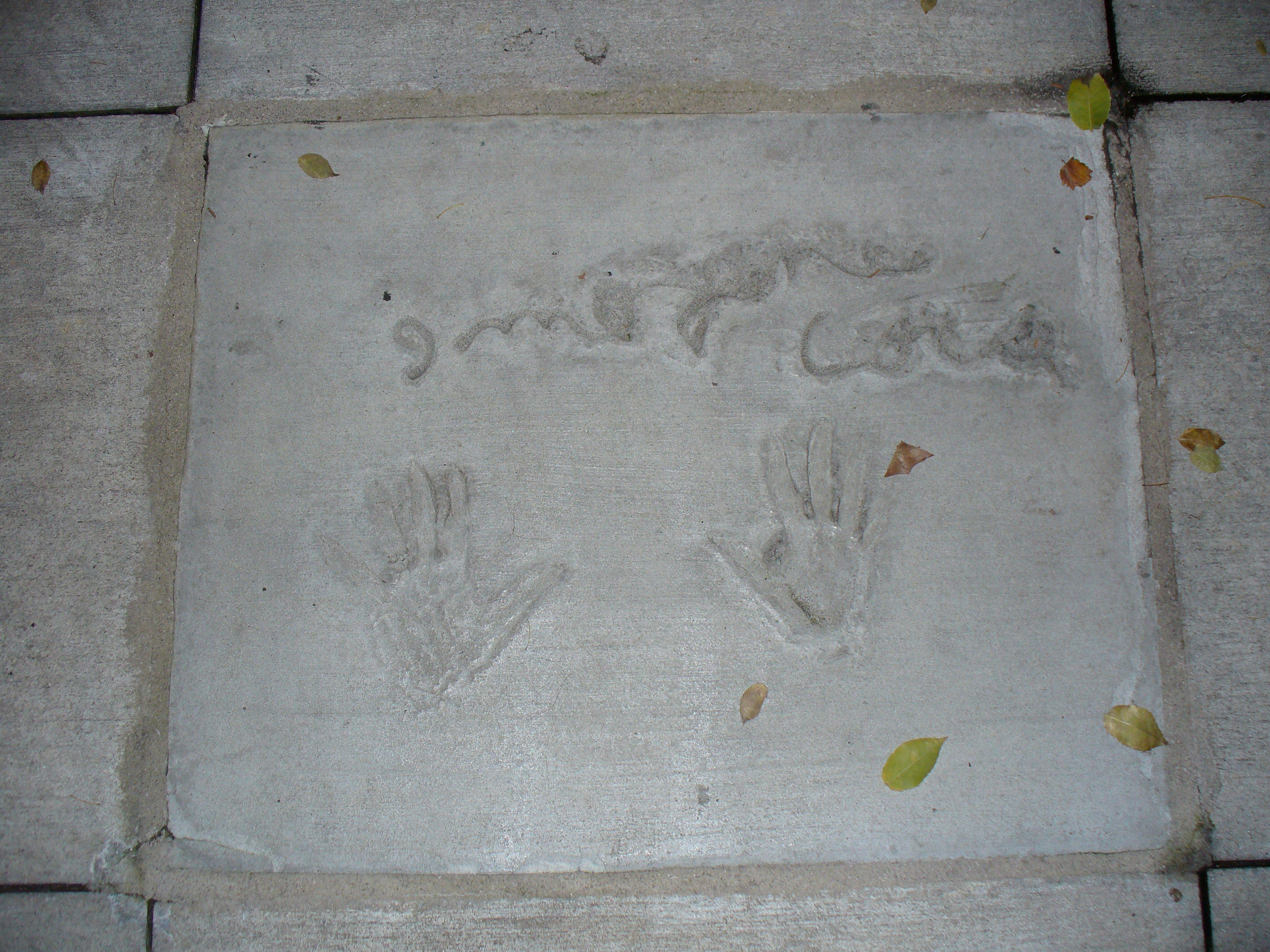
The handprints of Coca in front of Hollywood Hills Amphitheater at Walt Disney World's Disney's Hollywood Studios theme park

Coca had no children, but was married twice: for 20 years to Bob Burton, from 1935 until his death in 1955, and later for 27 years to King Donovan, from 1960 until his death in 1987. Burton's death came only one month after her mother had died. Coca was a practicing Roman Catholic.

Hours after Coca and Donovan completed their New Year's Eve 1972 performance of "Fourposter" at the Showboat Dinner Theater in St. Petersburg, Florida, they were involved in a serious auto accident. They had been driving in foggy weather to their home in Clearwater, Florida when Donovan collided with another car driven by 19-year-old Cheryl Lynn Rice. Rice was unharmed, but Donovan sustained a slight leg injury, and the rear-view mirror entered Coca's right eye, smashing her cheekbone. Transported to the Manhattan Eye, Ear and Throat Hospital, Coca underwent plastic surgery and a cosmetic lens covered her blind eye for the rest of her career, which resumed with her long stint in Broadway's On the Twentieth Century beginning in 1978.

Performers citing Coca as an influence include Carol Burnett, Lily Tomlin, Whoopi Goldberg and Tracey Ullman. Your Show of Shows is considered a television classic and was the basis for a well-received 1982 film, My Favorite Year. A 1992 musical version of the film ran on Broadway, in which comedic actress Andrea Martin won a Tony Award for her portrayal of Alice Miller.

In 1995, Coca was honored with the second annual Women in Film Lucy Award, honoring women's achievements in television and named after Lucille Ball.

== Death ==
On June 2, 2001, Coca died at her home in Westport, Connecticut at the age of 92 from natural causes incidental to Alzheimer's disease. She was cremated and her ashes were scattered.

== Filmography ==
=== Television ===
- Buzzy Wuzzy (1948; ran for four weeks)
- The Admiral Broadway Revue (1949–1950)
- Your Show of Shows (139 episodes 1950–1954)
- The Imogene Coca Show (1954–1955)
- Playhouse 90 ("Made in Heaven" 1956)
- General Electric Theater ("Cab Driver" 1957)
- Sid Caesar Invites You (1958, U.S.)
- Sid Caesar Invites You (1958, UK [BBC])
- The George Gobel Show (4 episodes 1959–1960)
- Shirley Temple's Storybook: Madeline (1960)
- Grindl (32 episodes 1963–1964)
- It's About Time (18 episodes 1966–1967)
- The Sid Caesar, Imogene Coca, Carl Reiner, Howard Morris Special (1967)
- The Carol Burnett Show (4 episodes 1967–1969)
- Love, American Style (2 episodes 1970, 1972)
- Bewitched (2 episodes 1971)
- Rod Serling's Night Gallery (The Merciful)- with husband, King Donovan.
- The Enchanted World of Danny Kaye: The Emperor's New Clothes (1972)
- The Brady Bunch ("Aunt Jenny" - 1972)
- The Incredible Incident at Independence Square
- Trapper John, M.D. ("Quarantine" 1980)
- Freddie the Freeloader's Christmas Dinner (1981)
- Return of the Beverly Hillbillies (1981)
- Fantasy Island ("Curtain Call" 1983)
- Mama's Family ("Aunt Gert Rides Again" 1983)
- One Life to Live (cast member from 1983–1984)
- As the World Turns (cast member in 1983)
- Alice in Wonderland (1985)
- Moonlighting ("Los Dos Dipestos" 1988)
- Monsters ("The Face" 1989)
- Garfield and Friends (Voice, 14 episodes 1994)
- Comic Relief VI (1994)

=== Film ===
- Bashful Ballerina (1937)
- Dime a Dance (1937)
- They Meet Again (1941)
- Promises! Promises! (1963)
- Under the Yum Yum Tree (1963)
- 10 from Your Show of Shows (1973)
- Rabbit Test (1978)
- National Lampoon's Vacation (1983)
- Nothing Lasts Forever (1984)
- Papa Was a Preacher (1985)
- Buy & Cell (1987)
- Hollywood: The Movie (1996)
- Her Alibi (1989) uncredited in court room

=== Broadway ===
- When You Smile (1925) Imogene
- Garrick Gaieties (1930)
- Shoot the Works (1931)
- Flying Colors (1932–1933) Jo-Jo, Miss Maris
- New Faces of 1934 (1934, with Henry Fonda)
- Fools Rush In (1934–1935)
- New Faces of 1936 (1936)
- Who's Who (1938)
- The Straw Hat Revue (1939, with Danny Kaye, Jerome Robbins)
- All In Fun (1940) Dancer, Esther, Mrs. Burton, Nymph, The Derelict
- Concert Varieties (1945)
- Janus (1955–1956) Jessica
- The Girls in 509 (1958–1959) Mimsy
- On The Twentieth Century (1978–1979) Letitia Primrose

=== Music video ===
- Bag Lady (1984 EBN-OZN)) The Bag Lady

=== Selected regional theater, national tours ===
- Bubbling Over (1926)
- Queen High (1928)
- Up to the Stars (1935)
- Calling All Men (1937)
- A Night at the Folies Bergere (1940)
- Happy Birthday (1948)
- Wonderful Town (1954) Ruth
- The Great Sebastians (1957)
- Once Upon a Mattress (1960–61)
- A Thurber Carnival (1961–62)
- Caesar-Coca Revue (1961–62)
- Bells Are Ringing (1962)
- Luv (1967)
- You Know I Can't Hear You When the Water's Running (1968–69)
- Why I Went Crazy (1969)
- A Girl Could Get Lucky (1970)
- The Rivals (1972) Mrs. Malaprop
- The Prisoner of Second Avenue (1973–74, with husband King Donovan)
- "Plaza Suite" ( c. 1976 Tidewater Dinner Theatre of The Stars, with King Donovan)
- Makin' Whoopee (1981, with Mamie Van Doren)
- The Gin Game (1984)
- My Old Friends (1985)
- On the Twentieth Century (1986–87) Letitia Primrose
