= Danny Simon =

American screenwriter (1918–2005)

Danny Simon

Daniel Simon (December 18, 1918, The Bronx, New York – July 26, 2005, Portland, Oregon) was an American television writer and comedy teacher. He was the inspiration for the character of Felix Unger in his brother Neil Simon's play, The Odd Couple.

== Biography ==
The older brother of playwright Neil Simon, he wrote comedy with his brother in the 1940s and 1950s.

As a writing team the brothers wrote for Buddy Hackett, Jan Murray and Phil Silvers and also wrote for radio and television shows such as Broadway Open House, The Red Buttons Show, The Jackie Gleason Show and Your Show of Shows until 1954 when Neil left the partnership to write plays.

As a solo writer, Danny became head writer of The Colgate Comedy Hour and then Make Room for Daddy. He also wrote for The Phil Silvers Show, Kraft Music Hall, My Three Sons, The Mac Davis Show, The Carol Burnett Show, Diff'rent Strokes, and The Facts of Life and also wrote jokes for Joan Rivers for her appearances as guest host of the Tonight Show Starring Johnny Carson. He later became a comedy teacher.

Danny Simon came up with the idea for The Odd Couple from his own experience from 1961 to 1963 when, while divorcing his wife, he shared an apartment with Hollywood agent Roy Gerber, whose wife had left him. Struggling after writing 14 pages of a first draft, he asked his brother Neil, who had expressed interest in the idea, to write it instead. Danny Simon received one-sixth of the royalties but was irritated at not receiving a "from an idea by Danny Simon" credit. Its success caused the brothers to become estranged for a decade.

Danny Simon also directed several Off-Broadway productions of his brother's plays and was the inspiration for characters in various Neil Simon plays such as Come Blow Your Horn, The Odd Couple, Plaza Suite, Chapter Two, Brighton Beach Memoirs and Broadway Bound, leading him to joke “There have been more plays written about me than about Abraham Lincoln, Joan of Arc and Julius Caesar all put together." He also contributed sketches to the Broadway stage revues New Faces of 1956 and Catch a Star.

== Quotations ==
Woody Allen said about Simon, "I've learned a couple of things on my own since and modified things he taught me, but everything, unequivocally, that I learned about comedy writing I learned from him".

Jimmy Boyd, "Being around Danny always makes me and everyone else happy. He is always up and positive, and he sees humor in absolutely everything. It is endless funny one-liners. In rehearsal I could read the same comedy line a hundred times, and Danny would be laughing".

== Personal life and death ==
Simon was married to Arlene Friedman from 1953 to 1962. The couple had two children, Michael Howard Simon and Valerie Jeanne Simon (died 2009). In 2011, Michael Simon was appointed by President Barack Obama to be a judge on the United States District Court for the District of Oregon.

Danny Simon died of heart failure in 2005 at age 86 at the Robison Jewish Health Center in Portland, Oregon. He had also suffered a stroke.
