= Brown's Hotel (Catskills) =

Resort in upstate New York

Coordinates: 41°46′48.6″N 74°40′58.6″W

Brown's Hotel in 1977

Brown's Hotel was a nationally known resort complex located in the Borscht Belt area of Upstate New York, in the Catskill Mountains. It was one of the largest and most elaborate establishments of its kind during an era when the entire region prospered as a tourist destination.

From the 1940s to the 1980s, the hotel was a popular vacation destination for many upper-middle-class families living in the New York City metropolitan area. Jewish-American families were welcomed and even catered to specifically by the hotels in the Borscht Belt during a time period when anti-semitism was prevalent in the hospitality industry. Filling a niche, the area quickly became a mecca for Jewish-American families. Brown's Hotel was located in the hamlet of Loch Sheldrake in the town of Fallsburg, Sullivan County, New York.

== History ==
Charles and Lillian Brown in 1977

By the 1940s, Sullivan County, New York became a popular resort area in the Catskill Mountains north of New York City frequented primarily by middle and upper-class Jewish families living in the Northeast. The area became known as the Borscht Belt or the Jewish Alps.

In 1944, in the hamlet of Loch Sheldrake, New York within the town of Fallsburg, Charles Brown, owner of several hotels, purchased the Black Appel Inn from the Appel family for US $70,000. The Appels had built the hotel in the early 1920s. After making an additional $100,000 in renovations, the 473-room hotel opened as Charles and Lillian Brown's Hotel and Country Club with the phone number Hurleyville 150. The resort became known for the wealthy patrons it attracted, competing against the larger establishments in the area. Without the advantage of having a golf course, the owners concentrated their capital on the finest food and big names in entertainment to entice tourists. The hotel's Brown Derby night club would book big names like comedians Bob Hope, Buddy Hackett. Jackie Mason, Woody Allen, and George Burns and musicians Sammy Davis, Jr., Tony Bennett, Harry Belafonte, and Liberace. The hotel also welcomed its share of celebrity guests such as Hollywood starlet Jayne Mansfield and boxer Jack Dempsey. Not only did the area attract families and celebrities, but Italian and Jewish gangsters as well. During the 1940s the bodies of their numerous victims would turn up in Loch Sheldrake, a lake less than two miles east of the hotel. By the 1950s, the mobsters had shifted their focus to Las Vegas and Cuba.

Room 533 in 1977

During the 1950s and 1960s, the resort became one of the Catskills’ signature hotels, among the three most popular in the area along with Grossinger's and The Concord. It was a luxurious establishment known for being family-friendly. As with modern-day cruise lines, tourists were enticed by unlimited food and entertainment at these establishments and Brown's Hotel lured their guests with the slogan “There’s More of Everything” and “A bit of California at your doorstep." The hotel would open in April each year and close in early November for the season. In the summer of 1954, Jerry Lewis arranged for Brown's Hotel to host the world premiere of his Hollywood film Living It Up without telling co-star Dean Martin. An ensuing argument, among other factors, caused America's most popular comedy duo to end their decade-long partnership. The movie ultimately premiered in Atlantic City on July 15, 1954.

For almost 20 years, Brown's Hotel hosted the annual Louis Tannen's Magic Jubilee.

== Decline ==
Charles Brown died in Miami, Florida on November 29, 1978, age 80. That summer, Bob Hope was paid $50,000 to make his sole appearance at a Catskills venue. At that point Lillian Brown, who owned 100% of the company, began gifting small shares of stock to her grandson Bruce. Because of societal changes that affected all Borscht Belt hotels, Sullivan County's heyday had passed and Brown's Hotel would struggle to stay afloat.

Brown's outdoor pool in 1977

In 1985, Brown's Hotel, the Pines Hotel, and Kutsher's (which were still run by first, second, and third generation family members) made an attempt at a renaissance. The three resorts began constructing residences for families seeking second homes in the mountains, living on the grounds of once great hotels and, for an additional fee, enjoying their athletic and entertainment amenities. Model luxury townhouses opened in early December of that year with cathedral ceilings and fireplaces. Investors included Hotels International, which had just purchased Grossinger's in November, one of Upstate New York's most popular resorts of the mid-20th century. The financers intended to build 250 units initially and eventually several thousand homes in the area. Hotel officials were optimistic that the target demographic of a second-home buyer was different from a hotel vacationer and thus hotel business would not suffer. Bruce Turiansky, the grandson of Lillian Brown, was at this time serving as vice president and general manager of Brown's Hotel and felt hopeful.

In 1986, suffering from financial trouble, accountant Bernard Lipsky convinced Lillian Brown to step down as president of Brown's Hotel so that her grandson Bruce could take over. This would give investors the appearance that the company was headed in a different direction. In 1988, after the plan failed to work, Lillian Brown was forced to file for bankruptcy protection. A deal in which the owner of the Tamarack Lodge in the Catskills would purchase Brown's Hotel fell through.

On May 30, 1997 at the age of 93, Lillian Brown died in Miami Beach, Florida. The memorial service was held in Monticello, New York, 14 miles south of the old Brown's Hotel property. By this time, fewer than ten of the 926 hotel/resorts in Sullivan and Ulster Counties remained.

== Rumors and myths ==
Some sources state that Brown's Hotel was among the resorts that served as the inspiration for "Kellerman’s Resort" in the 1987 motion picture Dirty Dancing. Some sites have mistakenly claimed that Brown's was featured in the actual movie. The film's script was inspired by screenwriter Eleanor Bergstein's childhood during which she spent summers with her parents in the Catskills, but the character Johnny Castle (played by Patrick Swayze) was based on dance instructor Michael Terrace who worked at nearby Grossinger's Resort. The Catskills resorts in general influenced the atmosphere of the motion picture, but as film production began in 1986 Grossinger's Hotel had just closed its doors for the last time. Because most of the area's hotels had shut down by the mid-1980s, the movie was instead filmed in Virginia and North Carolina. Another key figure in the film, the character of Penny Johnson, was loosely based on entertainment icon Jackie Horner who was also a dance instructor at Grossinger's. It has been rumored that parts of the 1976 Woody Allen film The Front and the 1974 Dustin Hoffman film Lenny were filmed at Brown's. However, at least according to one source (which often contains incomplete information about older movies), The Front was shot in Manhattan and, although comedian Lenny Bruce had performed at Brown's, the film itself was shot in Miami Beach. Both films do contain sequences in the Catskills and contain scenes with locations that bear a striking resemblance to Brown's.

== Jerry Lewis association ==
Brown's Hotel entrance, Jerry Lewis playing in 1978

The myth that Brown's Hotel employed comedic legend Jerry Lewis as a waiter has proliferated on the Internet. Prior to owning Brown's, Charles and Lillian ran the 38-room Hotel Arthur where Jerry Lewis worked as an emcee and a tea boy, returning to perform even after achieving Hollywood fame. The family also opened the Ambassador Hotel in Fallsburg where Lewis first performed as a comedian in 1942. Rather than a restaurant worker, Jerry Lewis was employed as an entertainer. Charles and Lillian Brown opened Brown's Hotel in 1944 and would eventually name the lounge The Jerry Lewis Theatre Club in honor of the notable comedian and family friend. Billboards along the highway encouraged motorists to “Do a Jerry Lewis - Come to Brown’s” as the celebrity was featured heavily in an advertising campaign that would contribute to the success of the resort. A large cartoon caricature of Lewis on another billboard stated “Brown’s is my favorite resort.” Jerry Lewis’ father Danny, a former vaudeville entertainer, also performed emcee duties at the lounge. For years during his famous telethon, Lewis would appeal to viewers to ask “Uncle Charles and Aunt Lillian” to donate to the fight against muscular dystrophy and would give out the number to Brown's Hotel.

Jerry Lewis never performed professionally either at the Hotel Arthur or Brown's Hotel until he returned to Brown's to promote a Martin & Lewis movie. Brown's Hotel did not have a lounge, but it did have two nightclubs. The smaller was The Brown Derby, and the main night club was originally known as "The Playhouse." The name was changed to The Martin & Lewis Playhouse when Jerry arranged for the debut of the M&L movie, Living it Up (1954). Dean Martin never showed up so Jerry did a solo. That was the first time Jerry performed at Brown's Hotel. The night club was then renamed "The Jerry Lewis Theater Club." Jerry Lewis never asked people to implore Charles & Lillian Brown to donate to the muscular dystrophy Association. Brown's Hotel was an official location where people in the Catskill region would call to make donations, and on the network feed of the Telethon, the phone number would be inserted on the screen, only to be seen in the New York market.

== Bankruptcy and condominium conversion ==
The Brown's Hotel was unable to survive the economic downturn. In July 1988, Lillian Brown filed for Chapter 11 bankruptcy citing US $11.7 million in debt and assets of US $21.5 million. The Times Herald-Record, a local newspaper in the Tri-State area, gave an optimistic report in early September 1988 heralding the Catskills’ best summer in years. Catskills Resort Association president Paul Carlucci predicted that Brown's would rebound from its difficulties. Brown's Hotel president Bruce Turiansky was equally encouraged. The hotel that had blossomed into a 570-room mountain retreat closed for the season on November 11, 1988. It would never reopen. Eighteen days later, all buildings on the property were sold at a foreclosure auction with 160 acres of land for US $5.3 million to Brooklyn-based Vista Environments Inc. President Rubin Margules, a real-estate developer, had planned to continue operating the facility as a hotel. The sale was used to pay a US $5.2 million mortgage debt. Renovation finally began in 1997. The resort was converted into the 396-unit Grandview Palace condominiums. The swimming pools, tennis courts, miniature golf course, chapel, synagogue, and the bar were all preserved. Even the Jerry Lewis theater remained intact, but the former hotel's restaurant remained closed. The property attracted a diverse crowd of inhabitants, some seeking weekend residences and others moving in for good as the renovation seemed promising with nearly 75% of the units being sold in the first few years.

== Building fire ==
In March 2012, the city of Fallsburg had threatened to condemn the condominium due to numerous violations including inoperable sprinklers, fire alarms, and fire doors, but the owners promised to fix the issues. Because of the fire safety issues, security personnel were ordered to patrol the grounds every 30 minutes in the event that a fire started. On Saturday, April 14, 2012, a guard on routine patrol noticed a wood-burning smell near an old boiler room at 5:05 p.m. but could not locate any smoke. A tenant smelled something burning at 5:20 p.m. and observed smoke rising from the main building but it was not deemed serious enough to call authorities. Around 6:00 p.m., the guard who initially smelled smoke unlocked the boiler room after reports of more smoke, he observed heavy smoke and flames leaping from the room at this time. The initial call came in at 6:06 p.m. but Loch Sheldrake fire chiefs, typically stationed just 1.1 miles east of the condominiums, were out of town for the weekend. The Hurleyville Fire Department five miles south of the property was called into action. The sizable inferno with 20 to 30-foot high flames eventually drew over 43 fire companies and 300 firefighters in what is believed to be the largest fire in Catskills history. Even forest rangers were brought in to battle fires that had burned nearly 20 acres of the Catskills’ characteristic pine forests. The blaze swept through the century-old wooden-frame structure destroying seven of the nine buildings of the complex aided by adjoining hallways between buildings and fueled by propane tank explosions. Over 100 residents were evacuated with no one seriously injured, many victims being relocated to the sports complex at Sullivan County Community College less than two miles southeast of the property. Four firefighters were slightly injured and by Sunday morning the fire had finally been extinguished. Fallsburg town supervisor Steven Vegliante believed that all fire code violations had been resolved before the blaze but insurance companies disagreed. On May 24, it was confirmed by officials that the fire began in the condominium's main building that had completely collapsed, initiating in a boiler room no longer in use in what was once the basement of the Brown's Hotel. The damage was so severe that the county's public safety commissioner Dick Martinkovic stated “We’ll never be able to go in there and put our finger on one specific thing and say that’s what it is.”

== Insurance and legal issues ==
In July 2011, Grandview Palace had obtained fire insurance, in addition to another existing policy, through Hartford Insurance Company, but the well-known financial group dropped its coverage less than two months later due to fire code violations. A replacement policy was then made through Illinois Union Insurance. Several abandoned resorts have burned in the vicinity under suspicious circumstances, including the former Heiden Hotel in May, 2008 and the former Tamarack Lodge in April, 2012: just one week prior to the Grandview Palace fire. In fact, since the 1940s, over 100 area hotels have been destroyed by fire. So many former residents of the Grandview Palace attended the subsequent Town Board session seeking answers that the meeting had to be adjourned and relocated down the street to a community center. A unanimous vote by the board condemned the entire property, as the two remaining buildings were uninhabitable. Only Building F, surviving intact, and one wing of Building I were structurally safe to enter after the incident. Building B was the second unit unscathed by fire, but a crumbling wall made it unsafe to enter. Portions of the building were found to contain asbestos, a substance no longer used in building construction because of the dangers of cancer. The condominium board was given sixty days to demolish the structure.

The Grandview Palace had two insurance policies totaling US $30 million but the insurance companies Illinois Union and Great American Insurance refused to make payments, citing falsification of information by the Grandview Palace, whose board members allegedly claimed there were no existing code violations nor a lack of automatic sprinklers. In November 2012, a meeting convened between the condominium board and condo owners; renters were not invited. It was revealed that Grandview Condo Board president Anthony Ambrogio had been replaced by John O’Neill. Owners who had missed several of the $90 monthly maintenance fees after the blaze were not allowed to ask questions, and others who had not paid any fees since the fire were banned altogether. A case pitting Grandview Palace against both insurance companies went to court in December, 2012. The legal process continued and, eventually, all four insurance claims by the Grandview Palace were combined into a single case. In November 2017, the New York State Court of Appeals (its highest court) ruled that Grandview had failed to maintain fully-functional sprinkler coverage in all buildings, as required by both of its insurance policies, and thus did not meet the requirements for coverage.

In 2020, the town of Fallsburg proposed taking over the Grandview site by eminent domain in order to clear the property for redevelopment. In February 2022, the town canceled the scheduled public hearing on the matter because there was no developer and the costs of asbestos abatement and demolition would have had to be borne by the local taxpayers.
