= Michael H. Nash =

American historian (1946–2012)

Michael Harold Nash (1946 – July 24, 2012) was an American labor historian, librarian, and archivist. Nash was the Director of the Tamiment Library and Robert F. Wagner Archives at New York University throughout the early years of the 21st Century until the time of his death. Nash is best remembered for the key role he played in first obtaining and then integrating the archives of the Communist Party USA into Tamiment Library's holdings, in addition to other acquisition projects.

== Biography ==
=== Early years ===
Nash was born in 1946, in The Bronx. Nash was raised as a red diaper baby as both his parents were schoolteachers with radical political views. His father Julius Nash, a science teacher, suffered job discrimination during the Cold War of anti-communism, having been removed from his teaching job in 1955 as part of a far reaching purge and blacklist of Communist and former Communist teachers in the New York City School system.

This purge, similar in form to policies implemented in other places in the United States presented their subjects with an irresolvable conflict: If one refused to sign a "loyalty oath" indicating that the signer had never been a communist, the individual was fired and blacklisted. If one signed such an oath and admitted that were or had been a member of the Communist Party USA, one was fired and blacklisted. If one signed such an oath and the "little McCarthys" administering the purge determined the signer had lied, the signer would be fired and blacklisted. Thus barred from the public schools, the elder Nash went on to manage a toy store, also teaching in a local yeshiva. His mother, Ruth Nash, taught business and was a union activist.

As a young boy, Nash was not driven by scholarly pursuits, instead being more interested in collecting comic books, baseball cards, and following the exploits of the local baseball team, the New York Yankees.

Nash attended Harpur College, today known as Binghamton University, in Vestal, New York, from which he graduated with a B.A. degree in History in 1968. Nash then enrolled in Columbia University in New York City, earning a M.A. in American History in 1969. Nash began work on a PhD in labor history, beginning a study of the political behavior of coal miners and steel workers during the Progressive Era. Nash was discouraged both by the magnitude of the project he visualized and the job market for labor historians, however, so he took steps towards becoming a professional archivist, earning a Master of Library Science degree in 1974.

Upon completion of his MLS, Nash returned to Binghamton University to complete his PhD in American Labor History under the tutelage of historian Melvyn Dubofsky, earning the degree in 1975. More years would pass before his dissertation subject, an attempt to demonstrate the emergence of American workers in heavy industry "into something resembling a class-conscious proletariat," would find print. This work, Conflict and Accommodation: Coal Miners, Steel Workers, and Socialism, 1890-1920, was published by Greenwood Press in 1982.

=== Career ===
With his scholarly writing occupying his free time, Nash began his career as an archival specialist at the New York Public Library in 1974, a position in which he remained for six years. Nash subsequently moved to assume a position as Assistant Archivist at Cornell University in Ithaca, New York. At Cornell Nash worked in the library of School of Industrial and Labor Relations, a position which lost its funding in 1982, forcing another change of employment.

Unable to find a position as a labor historian or archivist, Nash spent the next two decades of his career at the Hagley Museum and Library in Wilmington, Delaware, a facility specializing in collections dealing with the history of business and technology.

Nash came to New York University in the middle of 2002 to take a position as Director of the Tamiment Library and Robert F. Wagner Labor Archives, a specialized labor history collection housed at the university. Nash regarded this as "the dream job of his life" and remained in this position until the time of his death in 2012.

Nash was instrumental in the organization and expansion of this collection, which had its roots in the collection of the Socialist Party's Rand School of Social Science until its acquisition by NYU in 1963.

In March 2007 Nash was instrumental in arranging the transfer of the Reference Center for Marxist Studies (RCMS), the archive and library of the Communist Party USA, to NYU. Included in this material were some 20,000 books, 5,000 magazines, a complete run of party newspaper The Daily Worker, every party pamphlet ever produced, and the 1 million image photo archive of The Daily Worker and its successor publications.

Other collections garnered by Nash for Tamiment Library included the papers of Victor Navasky of The Nation magazine, Central Intelligence Agency defector and whistle blower Philip Agee, left wing civil rights and civil liberties attorney William Kunstler, and those of radical historian Howard Zinn.

According to Michael Stoller, Director of Collections and Research Services at NYU, Nash was particularly effective in obtaining key collections for Tamiment Library due to his sincerity, optimism, and likability. More importantly, Nash was also successful because of the respect that he earned by his achievements as a labor historian, his professionalism, and his knowledge of what was important and what was not important

In addition to his professional duties, Nash was the founder and co-director of the Center for the United States and the Cold War and the Frederic Ewen Center for Academic Freedom. Nash was an expert on the Spanish Civil War who periodically taught undergraduate courses on that topic at NYU. He was also a board member of the Abraham Lincoln Brigade Archives, an organization whose holdings are also housed at Tamiment Library at NYU, and a member of the Historians of American Communism.

=== Death and legacy ===
Michael Nash died on July 24, 2012, aged 66, of a pulmonary embolism. In his later life, he was working with the Occupy Wall Street movement in both safeguarding their developing collections for history and encouraging and using his knowledge of peoples movements to advise them on strategy and tactics. His legacy lives on in his work, the ongoing work of the Tamiment Library, and the deep affection that so many people felt for him over the decades. Few individuals combined the personal and the political as positively as Michael Nash. Few have really been scholars, teachers and activists as he had been.

== Works ==
- Conflict and Accommodation: Coal Miners, Steel Workers, and Socialism, 1890-1920. Westport, CT: Greenwood Press, 1982.
- "Business History and Archival Practice: Shifts in Sources and Paradigms," in James O'Toole (ed.), The Records of American Business. Chicago: Society of American Archivists, 1997.
- "Communist History at the Tamiment Library," American Communist History, vol. 3, no. 2 (December 2004), pp. 265–285.
- The Good Fight Continues: World War II Letters from the Abraham Lincoln Brigade. (Edited with Peter N. Carroll.) New York: New York University Press, 2006.
- How to Keep Union Records. (Edited with Debra E. Bernhardt.) Chicago: Society of American Archivists, 2010.
- Red Activists and Black Freedom: James and Esther Jackson and the Long Civil Rights Revolution. (Edited with David L. Lewis and Daniel J. Leab.) London: Routledge, 2010.
