= List of Borscht Belt comedians =

Comedians who got their start or regularly performed in Borscht Belt resorts include:

- Abbott & Costello
- Joey Adams
- Woody Allen
- Morey Amsterdam
- Bea Arthur
- Sandy Baron
- Benny Bell
- Jack Benny
- Milton Berle
- Shelley Berman
- Joey Bishop
- Mel Blanc
- Victor Borge
- Mel Brooks
- Lenny Bruce
- Burns & Allen
- Pesach Burstein
- Red Buttons
- Sid Caesar
- Jean Carroll
- Jack Carter
- Myron Cohen
- Billy Crystal
- Bill Dana
- Rodney Dangerfield
- Phyllis Diller
- Totie Fields
- Mickey Freeman
- Betty Garrett
- Estelle Getty
- George Gobel
- Shecky Greene
- Buddy Hackett
- George Jessel
- Mickey Katz
- Danny Kaye
- Alan King
- Robert Klein
- Harvey Korman
- Jack E. Leonard
- Mal Z. Lawrence
- Sam Levenson
- Jerry Lewis
- Richard Lewis
- The Marx Brothers
- Jackie Mason
- Lou Menchell
- Corbett Monica
- Howard Morris
- Zero Mostel
- Jan Murray
- Freddie Prinze Sr.
- Carl Reiner
- Don Rickles
- Joan Rivers
- Freddie Roman
- Rowan & Martin
- Mort Sahl
- Soupy Sales
- Dick Shawn
- Allan Sherman
- Phil Silvers
- Arnold Stang
- David Steinberg
- Jerry Stiller
- The Three Stooges
- Jackie Vernon
- Gene Wilder
- Jonathan Winters
- Ed Wynn
- Henny Youngman

== See also ==
- Borscht Belt
