= Tamiment =

Resort in Pike County, Pennsylvania, U.S.

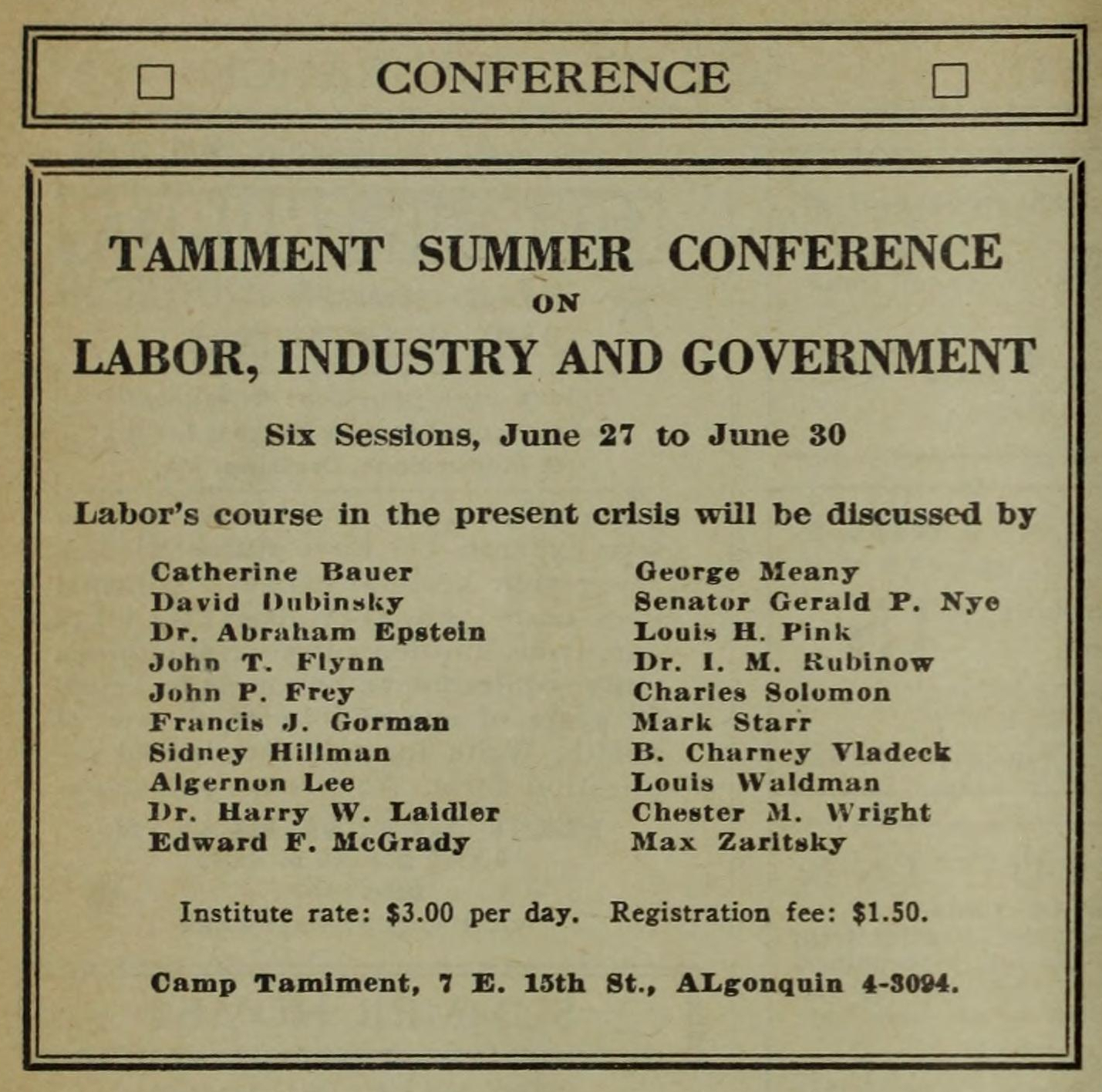
Advertisement in The Nation for a summer conference on labor, industry and government at Camp Tamiment featuring several prominent socialist and labor leaders as speakers, 1935

Tamiment, first known as Camp Tamiment, was an American resort located in the Pocono Mountains of Pike County, Pennsylvania, which existed from 1921 through 2005.

Originally established by the Rand School of Social Science in New York City as a Socialist camp and summer school, Tamiment developed into a regular resort and later fell under private ownership. The Tamiment Playhouse entertained guests with weekly revues and served as a training ground for many prominent Broadway and TV performers and writers. Playhouse alumni have included Danny Kaye, Imogene Coca, Jerome Robbins, Carol Burnett, Woody Allen, Neil Simon, and many others. Tamiment was a popular resort for Jewish singles and has been referred to as "a progressive version of the Catskills" and "a pillar of the Poconos tourist industry.

The Tamiment golf course, designed by Robert Trent Jones, was ranked among the top 200 U. S. golf courses by Golf Digest magazine. The resort was liquidated in 2005 to make room for a residential condominium development.

== History ==
=== Background ===
The Rand School of Social Science was a Socialist institution in New York City, founded in 1906 and governed by the American Socialist Society. The school enrolled five thousand students annually between 1910 and 1920 but often did not have enough capital to cover operating costs. The Lusk Committee, led by New York state senator Clayton Lusk, was investigating what it regarded as "subversive activities" and attempted to close the Rand School by injunction.

The school fought and won a costly two-year battle to remain open but, in 1920, its operating capital was at an all-time low. Bertha Howell Mailly, executive secretary of the Rand School, held many fundraisers and was credited for keeping the school afloat. She conceived of the idea of establishing a summer school and camp that would generate enough revenue to support both itself and the Rand School.

In the summer of 1919 Mailly had visited Unity House in Bushkill, Pennsylvania, a resort operated by a local chapter of the International Ladies' Garment Workers' Union (ILGWU). While she was there she learned that an adjoining 2,100 acre property was for sale, promptly made a deposit, and successfully raised the money to buy the land and establish a new camp. The facility was named Tamiment, an old Native American word for the area, and would be located less than one hundred miles from New York City.

=== Establishment and development ===
Camp Tamiment opened on June 21, 1921, and its first visitors were 65 members of Local Allentown, a Socialist party. The camp was designed "to diffuse a general knowledge of literature, art and science through the medium of lectures, publications, and dramatic performances." It earned an operating profit in its first year and became self-sustaining after 1923. Between 1937 and 1956, Camp Tamiment funded between half and three-quarters of the Rand School's annual operating budget.

In December 1922, Mailly referred to the camp as a "great aid and inspiration" for the Rand School. She said, "It enabled us to give the young men and women the thing they need, the joy of living to which they are entitled. They study with us. We teach them how to think in the right direction and in their leisure hours, we prove to them that we know how to play."

Camp Tamiment was described as "...the first attempt of Socialists and working people to make for themselves a place for rest, recreation and vacationing." A corporation identified as the People's Educational Camp Society (PECS) was created for the purpose of operating the camp.

Author Martha LaMonaco wrote, "Legally, the camp had been established as a separate entity from the school, but the two organizations shared both a common political and social ideology and numerous board members." The PECS board had envisioned Camp Tamiment as a country summer school, but Mailly and manager Ben Josephson chose to turn the facility into a regular resort. Political subjects were progressively downplayed while swimming, tennis, and calisthenics became the most popular activities.

Tamiment served as a destination for Jewish singles from the working and emerging middle class and would be referred to as "a progressive version of the Catskills..." The facility included a 90-acre lake and, in 1947, Tamiment opened an 18-hole golf course designed by Robert Trent Jones.

The golf course has been ranked among the top 200 U. S. courses by Golf Digest magazine and, beginning in 1959, it was the site of an annual golf tournament hosted by prominent entertainer Danny Kaye. Josephson described the Tamiment facility as "a summer resort that has attained top rank in the field, outranking by far many of the privately owned vacation places in both beauty and business."

The camp did not consider itself just a recreational enterprise as it had educational and cultural programs. All of the profits were reinvested in the camp or donated to charitable or educational institutions. These factors allowed Camp Tamiment to have tax-exempt status, which significantly contributed to its success.

Author Lawrence Squeri wrote, "Once Tamiment became a money-making resort, it also became a paradox. Ostensibly an institution devoted to the undermining of capitalism, it sought to make money in the best capitalist tradition." In the 1950s, resort guests might not have been aware of Tamiment's political agenda as it was sponsoring seminars offsite in New York City.

=== Later years and dissolution ===
The government took notice of Tamiment's tax exemption and would later characterize it as "one of the largest, most modern, and most profitable resorts in the Commonwealth of Pennsylvania." In 1956 the Internal Revenue Service (IRS) revoked Tamiment's tax-exempt status, ruling that the People's Educational Camp Society's main business was running a summer resort for profit and that its social agenda was secondary. The camp decided to acquire the title to the Rand School's library, the Meyer London Memorial Library and Reading Room, in order to continue its tax exemption. On March 29, 1956, the PECS acquired the title and full ownership of both the Rand School and its library. (The PECS dissolved the Rand School while its library, renamed the Tamiment Institute Library, moved into the Bobst Library at New York University in 1973.)

After multiple court appeals, the PECS lost its case for tax-exemption, and in 1963 Tamiment's parent corporation had a tax bill of almost ninety thousand dollars. On September 18, 1963, Josephson recommended to the PECS board that the resort be sold, and on June 28, 1965, Camp Tamiment was acquired by a Delaware corporation in a multimillion-dollar deal. Squeri wrote, "Once PECS lost the encumbrance of a commercial enterprise, it quickly regained its tax free status." At the time of the sale, Tamiment was described as "one of the largest resort hotels in the country..." and included over 150 buildings, over 300 employees, a theater that could seat 1,000 people, and a dining room that could seat 1,200.

During the 1970s and 1980s, stars Joan Rivers, Frankie Valli, Gladys Knight and the Pips, Alan King, and Donny and Marie Osmond performed at Tamiment. Las Vegas entertainer Wayne Newton purchased the resort in 1982 for a reported $15 million and planned to make it the flagship property in a national chain of timeshare hotels. He sold Tamiment in 1987. Lawrence Squeri wrote in 2002 that the facility "no longer has the New York liberal Jewish flavor that made it unique."

In March 2005 Tamiment owner Suong Hong sold the resort for $64 million to developers Greystone Capital Partners of Paoli, Pennsylvania. The firm started auctioning off Tamiment's contents on May 14 with the intention of demolishing the resort buildings. As of 2011, Greystone was planning to build over 200 residential condominiums on the 2,200 acre property. At the time of its sale, Tamiment was considered "...a pillar of the Poconos tourist industry."

== Tamiment Playhouse ==
The original Tamiment Playhouse was a multi-purpose facility in the 1930s while a new theater opened on July 5, 1941. LaMonaco wrote, "From all accounts, the theatre was not only beautiful but commodious, with 1,200 seats on a raked main floor and balcony. It was constructed almost entirely of wood cut at Pike County sawmills, with local fieldstone used on part of the exterior." Max Liebman became theater director at Tamiment in 1933 and created an original stage revue every Saturday night during the 10-week summer season. His shows combined music and dance with comedy, and the people Liebman hired included Danny Kaye, Sylvia Fine, Imogene Coca, Betty Garrett, Jules Munshin, Herbert Ross, and Jerome Robbins. The Broadway musical The Straw Hat Revue was based on his Tamiment revues from the 1939 season and had a large cast of Tamiment players. Liebman's last season at the playhouse was 1949 and, during the 1950s, he directed the TV variety show Your Show of Shows, utilizing his Tamiment experience to put on a weekly live revue. He stated, "I was really preparing myself for television at Tamiment. I was doing what you might call television without cameras..."

Tamiment Playhouse was referred to as the "Poconos boot camp for Broadway writers and performers." Broadway and TV producers watched the shows there and recruited new talent. Performers Barbara Cook, Carol Burnett, Bea Arthur, Larry Kert, and others gained experience at Tamiment. Cook considered the playhouse to be a "very important step" for her, as she developed the confidence to perform on Broadway. Noted choreographer Robbins learned the importance of timing and acquired the skill to quickly assemble material at Tamiment. Composer Jerry Bock spent three summers there, which he said helped prepare him for the experience of reworking a musical in pre-Broadway tryouts. Bock stated, "…How do you get to Broadway? Practice, at Tamiment!" Neil Simon's first theater work were the sketches he wrote with his brother Danny Simon for Tamiment Playhouse shows. "Getting the job at Tamiment was my first exposure to writing for the stage," Neil recalled, "and I knew as soon as I did that, it was what I wanted to do for the rest of my life."

Woody Allen acted and directed for the first time at Tamiment, where he also went from writing jokes to writing sketch comedy. Authors Willis Hall and Keith Waterhouse wrote, "Allen bemoaned the fact that he was not able to sell any of his Tamiment material, yet many of the ideas and themes formulated at Tamiment were seminal in terms of his later work..."

Once Upon A Mattress was originally presented as a one-act musical at the Tamiment Playhouse in August 1958. The show had been written by resident Tamiment writers and was designed to accommodate the lead players there. After being a hit with hotel guests, Once Upon A Mattress was significantly expanded for Off-Broadway, later moved to Broadway, and became one of the most frequently produced musicals in the United States.

The Tamiment Playhouse presented weekly summer revues until 1960, when audiences were dwindling. The theater was razed in 1976 to make space for meetings rooms and indoor tennis courts.
