= Nevele Grand Hotel =

Former Hotel in New York

Nevele Grande Hotel
- The tower and pool in 1977
- Interactive map of the Nevele Grande Hotel area

General information
- Status: Abandoned
- Type: Hotel
- Location: 1 Nevele Road, Ellenville, New York, United States
- Coordinates: 41.701°N 74.403°W
- Opened: 1901
- Closed: July 4, 2009; 16 years ago
- Owner: Mitchell Wolff, Joel Hoffman

Technical details
- Floor count: 10

Other information
- Number of rooms: 430

The Nevele Grande Hotel (NEV-uh-lee) was a high rise resort hotel located in Wawarsing, New York, United States, just outside Ellenville, New York; it closed in 2009. The Nevele dated back to the days of the Borscht Belt, opening in 1901. “Nevele” is “Eleven” spelled backward — according to lore — after the eleven nineteenth-century schoolteachers who discovered a waterfall within the present-day property. Also (according to family lore), the founder, Charles Slutsky, had eleven children from 1880 to 1906 and the name might have come from that instead.

The hotel closed in 2009. A June 2020 report indicated that the "buildings remain, falling apart and with no future of reuse ... there are plans to tear down the remaining structures on the property and turn it into a sports complex." The property included a once-highly-regarded 18-hole golf course and a 9-hole golf course. The 18-hole course has fallen into disrepair, while the 9-hole is being operated by Honors Haven as the Fallsview Golf Course.

Fires in March 2024 and January 2025 destroyed or damaged some of the remaining buildings on the property.

== History ==
Nevele lobby in 1978

The Nevele Country Club was established in 1901 by Charles Slutsky (1861-1931), who named the first accommodation the Nevele Falls Farm House. Following the Catskill hotel fashion of Mission Revival architecture, new wings were built in that style in the 1920s and 1930s. The Slutsky family also operated the adjoining Fallsview hotel, which was merged with the Nevele for a time. In the 1950s and 1960s, the Nevele was greatly expanded in the modern style that had come to prevail in the Catskills by then. Architect Sydne Schleman designed the Vacationer Wing and the Waikiki Indoor Pool in 1954. These were followed by architect Herbert D. Phillips' Golden Gate and Empire wings from 1956, linked to adjoining buildings by tunnels. Phillips also designed new lobbies in a style that followed the influential hotel designs of his former employer, Morris Lapidus, who had worked at other Catskill resorts. By 1964, Phillips was a partner at the New York firm Viola, Bernard & Phillips, who designed the ten-story dodecagonal Nevele Tower. The nearly-circular building was intended to counter the excessive corridor lengths that plagued more traditional Catskill hotels. President Lyndon B. Johnson stayed at the Nevele in 1966 to dedicate a new hospital in Ellenville.

=== Later years and closure ===
Originally simply named Nevele, the resort was renamed the Nevele Grande when it again merged with the adjacent Fallsview resort after the Nevele was sold by the Slutsky family in 1997. By 2006, the Nevele Grande had fallen on hard times and the Fallsview property was sold. The Fallsview has since reopened as the Honors Haven Resort and Spa. The original Nevele property, containing a distinctive high-rise, remained open for several years after the split as the Nevele Grande resort. Owners Mitchell Wolff and Joel Hoffman struggled financially and failed to pay taxes; they would eventually shut down the resort without notice after the 2009 Fourth of July weekend.

On September 1, 2009, an auction of the property was cancelled the day before it was to occur because a buyer was allegedly found. However, by the time the auction was scheduled, the property had fallen into a state of disrepair, including "musty staircases and rooms, big and small, with odd smells wafting out of them." The hotel remained unsold months later, although Hoffman was still attempting to generate revenue with a deal to sell timber on 100 acres (0.40 km^{2}) of property. He also renewed an agreement to let Nextel put cell phone antennas atop one of the buildings.

Room 1613 in 1977

On March 26, 2010, New York State Supreme Court Judge Mary Work granted Wolff ownership of the hotel in light of Hoffman's failure to pay Wolff an earlier $2 million judgment. The initial dispute arose when Wolff sold Hoffman 99% control of the hotel in exchange for lifetime health benefits, a deal on which Hoffman almost immediately reneged. Judge Work described Hoffman's mismanagement of the hotel as "staggering" and upbraided him in court for failure to be forthcoming.

=== Redevelopment efforts ===
In May 2012, Nevele Investors LLC, a subsidiary of Claremont Partners Ltd. (which had purchased the resort), announced that the Nevele Grande would undergo a $500 million redevelopment to turn it into a resort and casino, subject to approval of state legislation to allow casino gaming. The 1966 tower and entrance lobby, ice skating rink, and golf course would be retained in the new complex. Although the state rejected the proposal to bring gambling to the project in 2014, a developer planned to incorporate the hotel into new mega sports complex with construction to begin in 2017. In March 2019, the developer said that funding had not been secured and that there was no timetable regarding the planned project’s future. It never materialized and the property continued to deteriorate. By January 2022, a New York-based property developer was proposing to redevelop the site for hotel and residential use.

On September 29, 2023, the Nevele was sold for $5 million to 1100 Arrow LLC as part of plans by New York City-based developer Somerset Partners to demolish remnants of the former Borscht Belt hotel in favor of a new facility with lodging, accompanied by a 126-unit housing development. The former golf course is to be transformed into "...a low maintenance landscape with focused native planting..."

On the night of March 19, 2024, a fire broke out within the winter lodge, the oldest building on the property, taking over 15 hours to tame. The source of the fire was unknown at the time. As of August 2024, the property was reported to still be in a state of neglect and abandonment.

On the morning of Saturday, January 11, 2025, a two-alarm fire consumed a majority of the main building, including the lobby and dining room.

== Description ==
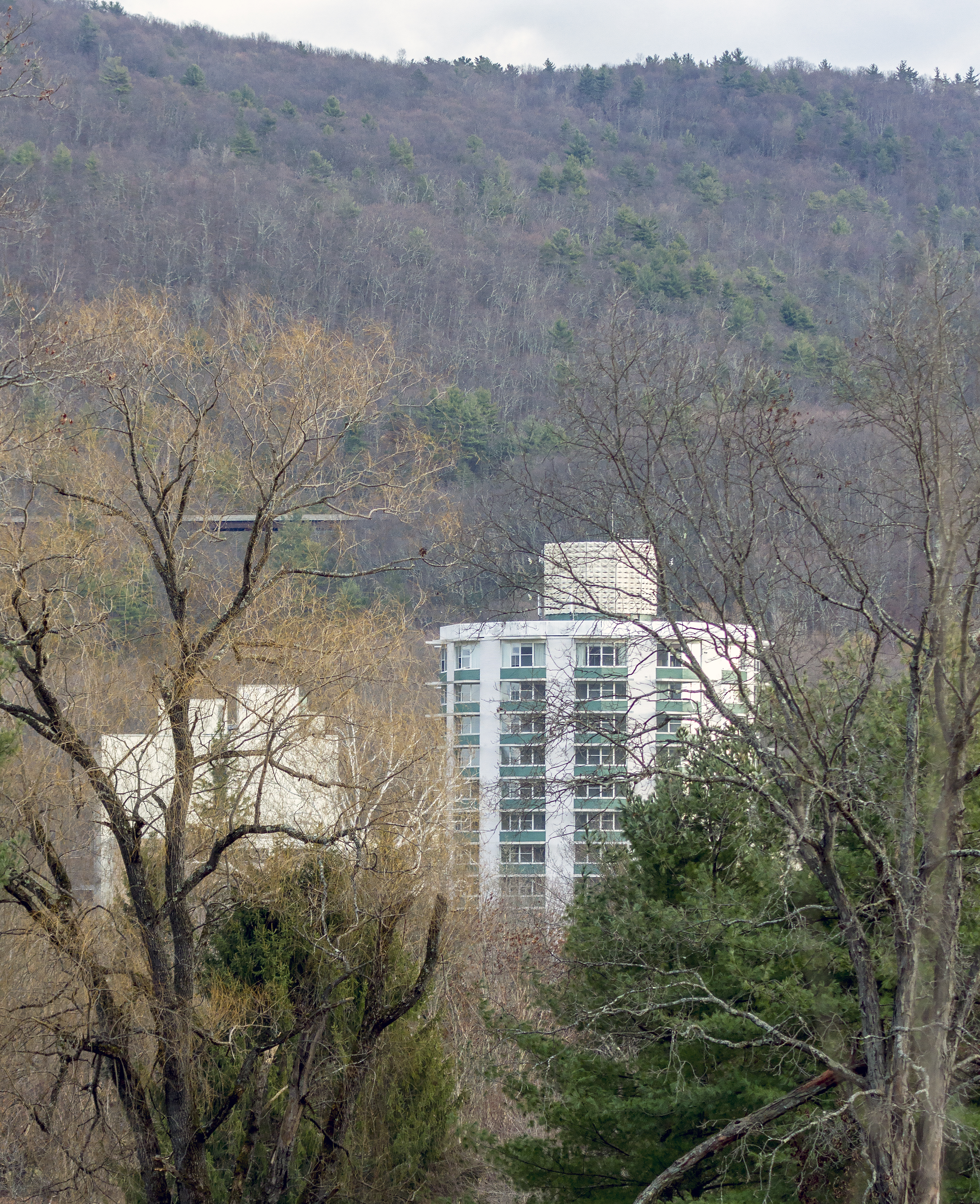
Nevele Hotel tower in 2015

The Nevele property is located in a valley just to the west of the Shawangunk Mountains, between two small lakes. The complex was dominated by the Nevele Tower at the main entrance drive. The Empire Wing was to the east and contained the main lobby. The Stardust and Safari Lounges connected the tower and the Empire wing. Other wings included the Colonnades and the Pennsylvanian. Conference facilities, unusually extensive for a Catskills resort, surrounded the guest wings. The Nevele had a total of 430 rooms at its height. Renovations in the 1990s have obscured the notable design features of the 1960s interiors. The Waikiki Indoor pool and health club were the easternmost components, beyond which lied the ski chalet and ski slope. The 1970 ice skating rink was designed by Dennis Jurow using glulam wood beams that sweep upward to a line of skylights. The resort also included an 18-hole golf course, with nine more holes available on the Fallsview resort, designed by Robert Trent Jones and Tom Fazio.
