= Bertha Howell Mailly =

American educator (1869–1960)

- Mailly, from a 1912 publication
- Born: February 2, 1869; Chicago, Illinois, U.S.
- Died: August 14, 1960 (aged 91); Laguna Beach, California, U.S.
- Occupations: Educator, camp director, suffragist, journalist, politician
- Spouse: William Mailly

Bertha Howell Mailly (February 2, 1869 – August 14, 1960) was an American educator, journalist, suffragist, and politician. She was executive secretary of the Rand School of Social Science in New York City from 1909 to 1937, and director of the Tamiment summer resort in the Pocono Mountains from 1921 to 1947. She was married to Socialist Party of America leader William Mailly from 1898 until his death in 1912.

== Early life and education ==
Howell was born in Chicago, Illinois, the daughter of John Cunningham Howell and Jeannette "Jennie" Bryden Williamson Howell. She graduated from Cornell University in 1894. She was a member of Phi Beta Kappa. She pursued further studies during a year in Florence.

== Career ==
Mailly traveled to Colorado in 1904 to report on striking miners there. She was a librarian at the New York Public Library in 1907. She was active in the women's suffrage movement, and in the Women's Trade Union League in New York. She was one of the WTUL activists sued in 1910, after a shirtwaist makers' strike.

Mailly was executive secretary of the Rand School of Social Science in New York City from 1909 to 1937. In 1914, she was a Socialist Party delegate to the New York Constitutional Convention. She was the unsuccessful Socialist Party candidate for New York State Senate in 1917, and for the New York State Assembly in 1919. In 1919 she was ejected from a state legislative committee hearing for refusing to testify. She was a member of the national executive committee of the Socialist Party of America in 1920. In 1921 she founded Tamiment, a mountain resort in Pike County, Pennsylvania, to raise funds for the Rand School. She was Tamiment's director until she retired in 1947. A meeting hall at Tamiment was named for her.

== Publications ==
- "In the Strike Region" (1904)
- "From Birth to Death" (1904)
- "The Coal Miners' Strike in Colorado" (1904)

== Personal life ==
Howell married socialist leader and writer William Mailly in 1898. He died from cancer in 1912, and she died in 1960, at the age of 91, in Laguna Beach, California.
