= Rand School of Social Science =

School in New York City, United States (1906–1935)

- Former building
- Successor: Tamiment Library and Robert F. Wagner Archives
- Formation: 1906 (120 years ago)
- Dissolved: 1935 (91 years ago)
- Headquarters: People's House, 7 East 15th Street, New York City, New York, U.S.
- Coordinates: 40°44′12″N 73°59′32″W
- Subsidiaries: Rand School Press
- Affiliations: Socialist Party of America, Amalgamated Clothing Workers Union, International Ladies' Garment Workers' Union
- Remarks: Known as the Tamiment Institute and Library after 1935

The Rand School of Social Science was formed in 1906 in New York City by adherents of the Socialist Party of America. The school aimed to provide a broad education to workers, impart a politicizing class consciousness, and additionally served as a research bureau, a publisher, and the operator of a summer camp for socialist and trade union activists.

The school changed its name to the Tamiment Institute and Library in 1935 and was closely linked to the Social Democratic Federation after the 1936 split of the Socialist Party. Its collection became a key component of today's Tamiment Library and Robert F. Wagner Archives at New York University in 1963.

== Institutional history ==
=== Forerunners ===
The idea of conceiving new schools for the promotion of socialist ideas in the United States emerged at the end of the 19th century, when a group of Christian socialists, organized as the Social Reform Union, established the correspondence school, College of Social Science in Boston in 1899. Another similarly short-lived institution called the "Karl Marx School" was established in the city at the same time. Neither managed to leave much of a mark upon the historical record.

A more successful effort at worker education was made in England with the establishment of Ruskin College in Oxford, England, also in 1899. Three Americans were instrumental in the formation of this entity, Mr. and Mrs. Walter Vrooman and Charles A. Beard, the latter a young graduate student at Oxford University. The trio soon returned to America, where they continued their interest in and activity related to adult worker education, although none of the three were directly responsible for the establishment of the Rand School.

Shortly after the establishment of the Socialist Party of America in August 1901 an effort was made to establish an institution called the Workmen's Educational League in New York City. This was soon renamed the Socialist Educational League, but the change of moniker did nothing to aid the school's survival and it, too, soon passed from the scene without leaving more than the faintest trace in the contemporary socialist press.

A more serious and official effort at establishing a New York socialist training school came late in 1904, when the City Central Committee of Local Greater New York announced that between the first of the year and May 30, 1905 a socialist school would be established "especially for the instruction of speakers."

Established through the initiative of party founders Morris Hillquit and Henry L. Slobodin, party newspaper editor Algernon Lee, and ex-Haverhill, Massachusetts mayor John C. Chase, the training school conducted evening courses in history, economics, and philosophy over a 21-week period, offering lectures one night per week. Secretary of this "Board of Instructors" was prominent socialist writer John Spargo, who used his home in Yonkers as the corresponding office for this 1905 effort.

=== Formation ===
The idea of a permanent socialist school in New York City, which took form as the Rand School of Social Science, began with the Christian socialist minister, George D. Herron, and his mother-in-law and financial patron, the widowed lumber heiress Caroline (Carrie) A. Rand. After marrying Mrs. Rand's daughter (also named Carrie) in 1901 — regarded as scandalous owing to his divorce and abandonment of his first wife and family — the Herrons moved to New York City, where George became a prominent figure in the fledgling Socialist Party.

The school was established in 1906, made possible by a $200,000 endowment by Mrs. Rand at the time of her sudden death in 1905. The fund was administered by Rand's daughter, Carrie Rand Herron, and Morris Hillquit. A total of about 250 students were enrolled for courses during the school's first year.

In a letter to Morris Hillquit, Herron harmonized the use of the Rand fortune to finance the New York socialist school with the thinking of the elder Carrie Rand back in Iowa in the 1890s:

Mrs. Rand originally had under consideration the establishment of school of Social Science in connection with Iowa College. But when she became aware that it would be impossible to establish such foundation, especially following my enforced resignation, she gave up the thought of what she had in mind at Iowa College ... The school is, in fact, some such thing as Mrs. Herron and I had planned and talked about for many years, and to which I expected at the time, to give my own life personally, as a teacher and organizer of the same.

Operations of the Rand School were governed by an entity called the American Socialist Society, which included as board members Algernon Lee, Job Harriman, Benjamin Hanford, William Mailly, Leonard D. Abbott, and Henry Slobodin. Formal direction of the school was conducted by a Secretary, originally author and publicist W. J. Ghent.

Ghent was succeeded late in 1909 by Algernon Lee. A reorganization in about 1911 replaced the position of Secretary with an Education Director and an Executive Secretary, both responsible to the Board of Directors. Lee was retained in the former role, while Cornell University graduate Bertha Howell Mailly was employed in the latter position.

=== Development ===
Advertisement for the Rand School Restaurant from the debut issue of The Masses magazine, January 1911.

In its early years, the school conducted regular lectures and night courses. The first location of the school was at 112 East 19th Street — a one family house converted to use as a school. To help reduce overhead costs some of the rooms of this dwelling were rented out to tenants. The school remained in this brownstone for six years, before losing the lease and being forced to move to a similar building down the block at 140 East 19th Street in 1912.

Beginning in 1911–12, the Rand School implemented a full-time training course, in which students devoted themselves to the study of history, economics, public speaking, and socialist theory without interruption for a period of six months. During the first four years of the existence of the full-time course, 38 men and 8 women completed the program, with 15 others withdrawing before graduation.

The Rand School maintained a close relationship not only with the Socialist Party of America proper, but also with the Intercollegiate Socialist Society and such trade unions as the Amalgamated Clothing Workers Union and the International Ladies' Garment Workers' Union. The school's Labor Research Department declared:

"The school had a very definite object — that of providing an auxiliary or specialized agency to serve the Socialist and Trade Union Movement of the United States in an educational capacity — to offer to the outside public an opportunity for studying the principles, purposes, and methods of this movement; and to offer to the adherents of the movement instruction and training along the lines calculated to make them more efficient workers for the Cause."

Starting in 1913, the Rand School established a Correspondence Department, conducting coursework by mail with socialists and sympathetic unionists around the country. Some 5,000 people took courses by mail from the Rand School by 1916. In addition to classes and public lectures, the Rand School also maintained a reading library.

Instructors and occasional lecturers at the school included Algernon Lee, Scott Nearing, Morris Hillquit, Charles A. Beard, John Spargo, Lucien Sanial, James Maurer, David P. Berenberg, Anna A. Maley, and August Claessens.

In the fall of 1917, with the assistance of a significant financial gift from international gem merchant A.A. Heller, the Rand School moved into a new headquarters facility located a 7 East 15th Street in Manhattan's Union Square neighborhood — a building which it purchased from the YWCA. The new "People's House," as it was called, was a six-storey rectangular building about 75 feet wide by 100 feet long. The lease was formally held by the Society of the Commonwealth Center, which sublet all of the 2nd and 3rd floors, as well as parts of the 1st, 4th, 5th, and 6th floors to the school.

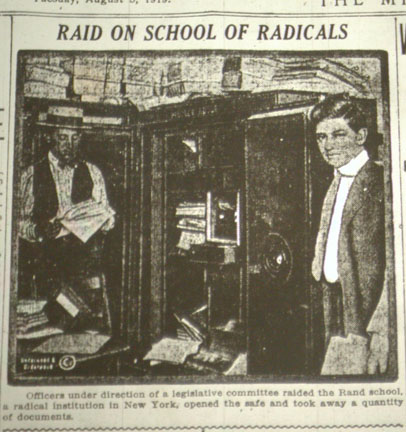
The Lusk Committee raided the Rand School in the summer of 1919 and seized documents to fuel its investigations

A restaurant and a bookstore said to be the largest radical bookstore in New York City were closely affiliated with the project, with proceeds from each churned back into the school to help offset its expenses. In 1918 the bookstore did more than $50,000 in gross sales, thereby generating a profit for the school of about $10,000. The size and success of the bookstore allowed the school to enter the market as a publisher of political books and pamphlets, launching a labor almanac called the American Labor Year Book in 1916 and publishing material by Morris Hillquit, Scott Nearing, Louis Waldman, Harry W. Laidler, Albert Rhys Williams, and N. Lenin among others.

The school also sought to expand participation through the opening extension offices in the Bronx and Brownsville as well as across the Hudson River in Newark, New Jersey during this period.

The Rand School's annual operating budget for the 1918-19 academic year was approximately $45,000, of which tuition and fees covered about half. Business operations, donations, and the small and diminishing legacy of Carrie Rand covered the rest of the deficit, which was further minimized by comparatively low rates of compensation for teachers and staff.

Beyond its general educational purposes, the Rand School was envisioned as a mechanism for the training of dedicated cadres for the Socialist and trade union movements. An article in the Socialist New York Call likened the school to a "sociological seminary" in which "men and women prepare themselves to be evangelists of a new faith" in which they would go forth "not to fat parishes and prosperous careers, but to hardship, maybe to martyrdom." As such, the school drew close scrutiny during the years of World War I as part of government efforts to suppress opposition to the European war effort.

American participation in World War I did not dampen the level of participation in the Rand School. The institution saw a record enrollment of about 4,000 students for one or more classes in the 1918 academic year and an additional gain of up to 50% was projected by Executive Secretary Bertha Mailly for 1919-20. Of these all but 30 were part-time students, with an additional 70 taking a full complement of courses spread out over a longer period, attending classes only 2 or 3 nights a week.

=== Mob attacks ===
Following the end of hostilities in Europe on November 7, 1918, the Rand School was the target of a series of four mob attacks involving demobilized soldiers. The first such incident came on November 25, 1918, during which a Canadian soldier led an organized group of his uniformed fellows in an effort to gain control of the building. Windows in the building were broken in the assault, which followed a mass rally at Madison Square Garden calling for the freedom of radical California labor leader Tom Mooney. The violent raiders were ultimately halted and dispersed by police reserves.

Two more lesser incidents followed, neither of which gained sufficient critical mass to seriously threaten the building and its occupants.

The fourth and final mob incident, and one of the most serious, occurred on May Day 1919. Several hundred demobilized soldiers, many of whom were in uniform, attacked a series of Socialist Party and Industrial Workers of the World headquarters buildings in New York City, including among their targets the Rand School. Doors to the building were locked against them, but raiders ascended the fire escapes outside and entered the 2nd floor Rand School library through the windows. Those who had gained entrance were dissuaded from violence by those inside the building and they peacefully exited without further incident.

=== Lusk Committee raid and prosecution ===
Full page magazine ad published in August 1919 soliciting funds for the legal defense of the Rand School of Social Science following the Lusk Committee raid.

On June 21, 1919, mob action was replaced by a legal raid on the Rand School premises, in which representatives of New York's Lusk Committee, appointed by the state legislature to investigate radicalism in the state, obtained a search warrant that was served by 10 members of the state constabulary, assisted by 55 former members of the American Protective League. A large number of books, papers, and documents were removed by the raiders — material which served to further the course of the Lusk Committee's investigation. Two days later, police officials returned and drilled open the safe belonging to the Commonwealth Center, Inc., owners of the Rand School building, and removed additional documents contained therein.

The Rand School was prosecuted for alleged violation of the Espionage Act for publishing the radical anti-militarist pamphlet, "The Great Madness," written by Scott Nearing. In a sensational trial, conducted in 1919 after conclusion of the war itself, Nearing was acquitted of the charges against him, but the Rand School was found guilty for having distributed Nearing's work and was fined $3,000.

The Rand School was also raided in the summer of 1919 by the New York State Legislature's Lusk Committee, searching for evidence of connection to the Communist Party of America. No prosecution followed from this raid although records were seized providing the names of students through the years.

=== Post-war development ===
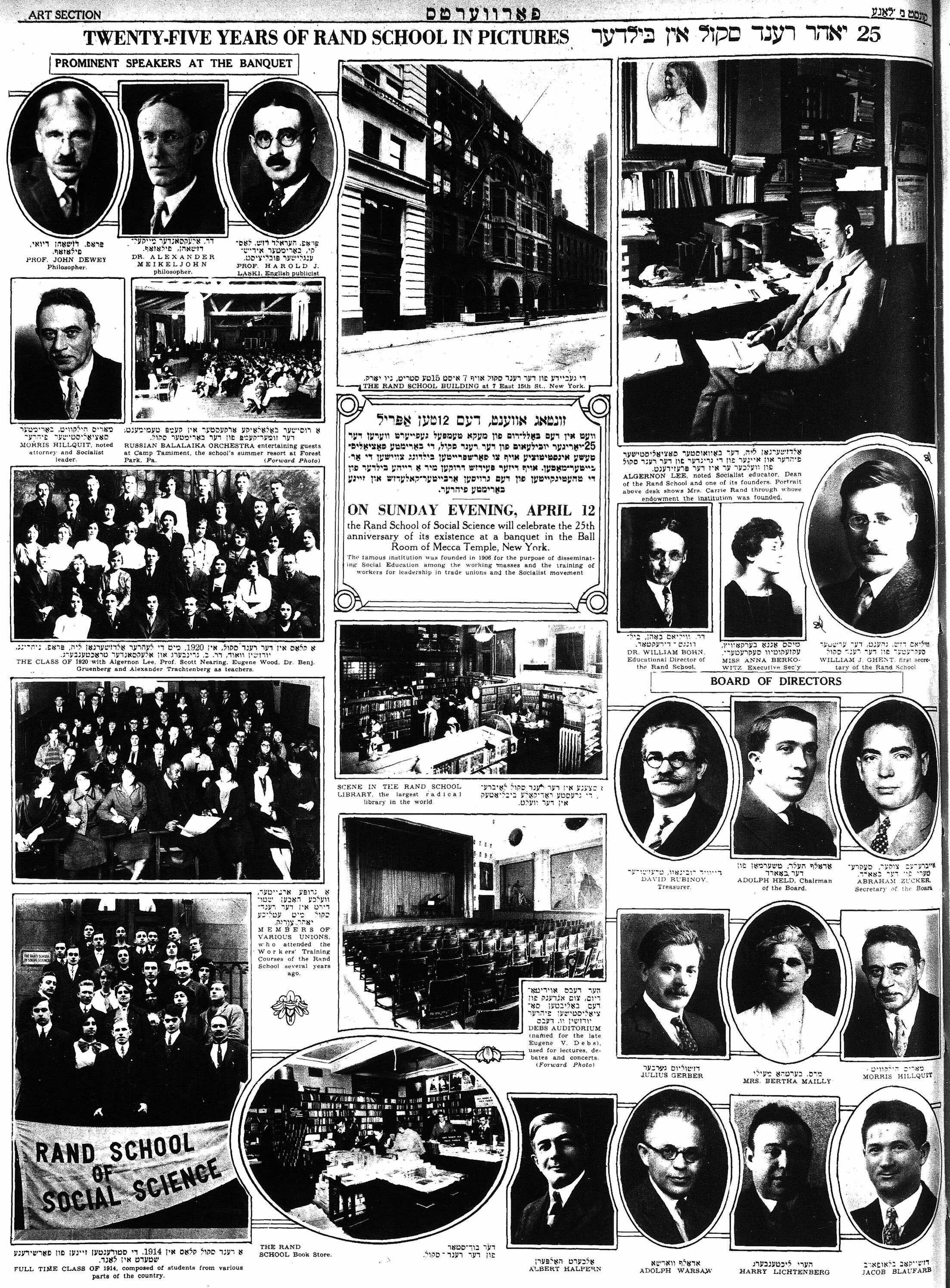
Page from the Jewish Daily Forward's art section celebrating the Rand School's 25th anniversary, March 29, 1931

In 1921, individuals close to the Rand School opened a summer school in the Pocono Mountains of Pennsylvania called "Camp Tamiment." The summer camp idea, pioneered by the Fabian socialist movement in Great Britain, allowed socialists and trade unionists the opportunity to escape the summer heat in the city and to attend courses with their fellows in a pastoral setting. Among those teaching classes at Camp Tamiment over the years were Norman Thomas, Jessie Wallace Hughan, and Stuart Chase.

By 1924, the Rand School boasted a library with over 6,000 bound volumes, as well as a wide array of pamphlets, magazines, and newspapers. The school was responsible for the publication of an annual almanac of the labor movement entitled The American Labor Year Book and was instrumental in the establishment of the Labor Education Council, together with the Furrier's Union, the Amalgamated Knit Goods Workers, and other unions centered in New York.

In 1935, the Rand School changed its name to the "Tamiment Institute and Library," although it continued to use the imprint "Rand School Press" for its printed publications.

=== The Rand School after the 1936 split ===
During the Socialist Party split of 1936, the Rand School of Social Science followed the Old Guard faction out of the party and into the new Social Democratic Federation. During this final interval the school was supported by an increasing percentage of the profits generated by Camp Tamiment, the SDF's country summer camp for trade union workers. by the late 1930s more than half of the Rand School's operating expenses were generated from the proceeds of Camp Tamiment, rising to more than 75% during the last years of the school's existence. Indeed, as one historian of the Rand School has noted, "the School's continued existence was possible only as long as the Camp continued to pay the bills.:

=== Termination and legacy ===
In 1956, the economically failing school was purchased by the operators of Camp Tamiment, who formally terminated its educational operations while continuing to maintain its library, renamed after the camp's managing director, Ben Josephson. This status ended in 1963, when the Josephson Library was made a part of the special collections library at New York University, known today as the Tamiment Library and Robert F. Wagner Archives.

== Teachers ==
=== Instructors and lecturers (1915–1916) ===
The pamphlet The Rise and Decline of Christian Civilization by Scott Nearing includes mention of "Instructors and Lecturers. 1915–1916":

- Samuel E. Beardsley
- Louis B. Boudin
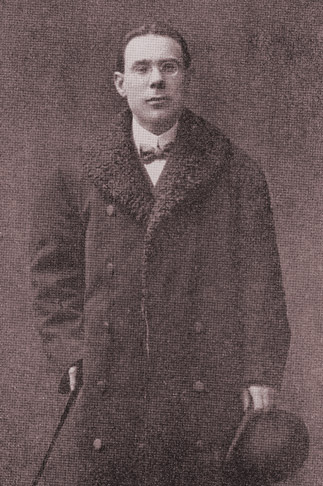
  Louis B. Boudin (1907)
- August Claessens
- Morris Hillquit
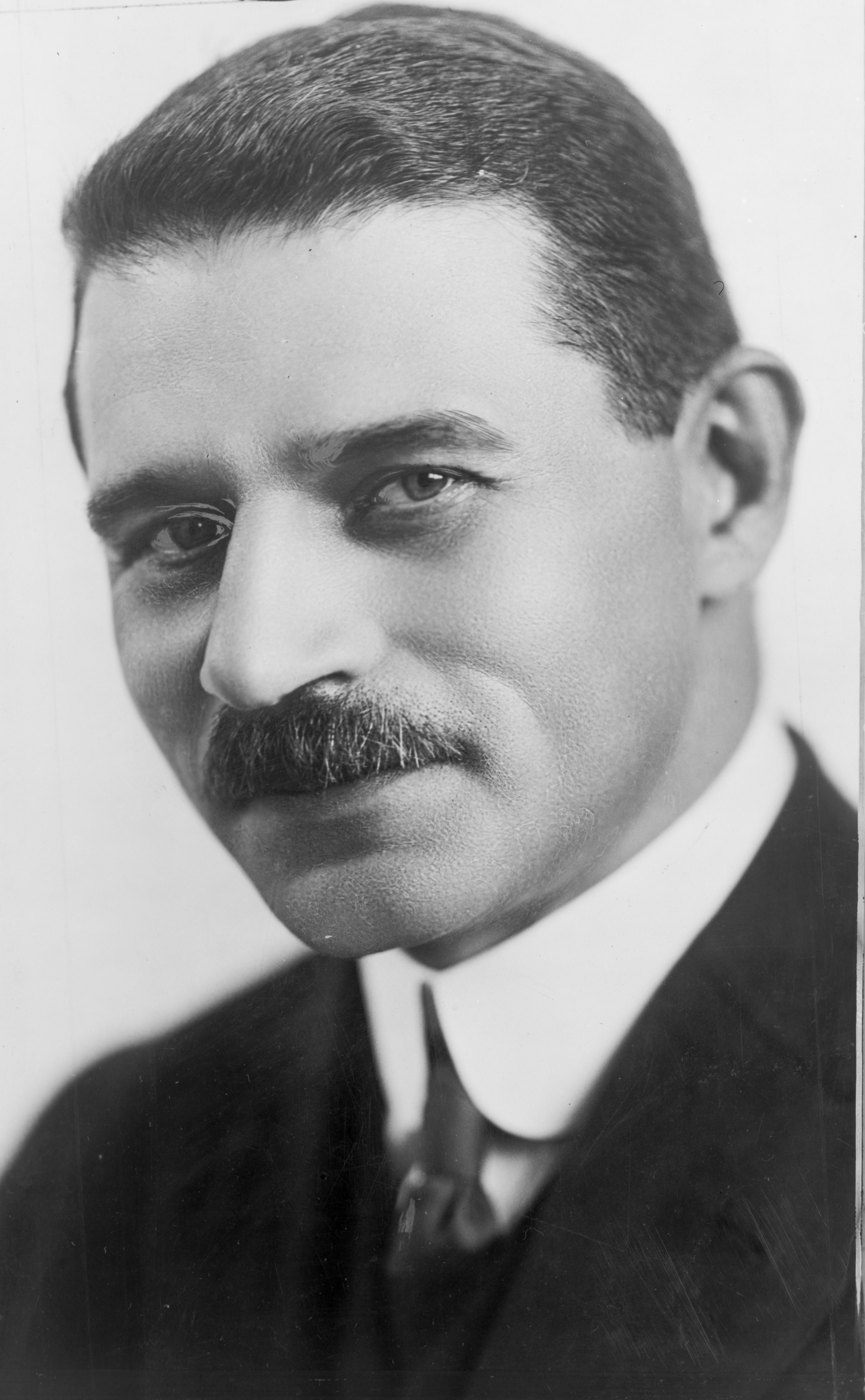
  Morris Hillquit, founder of the Socialist Party of America
- Scott Nearing
- Juliet Stuart Poyntz
- I. M. Rubinow
- James T. Shotwell
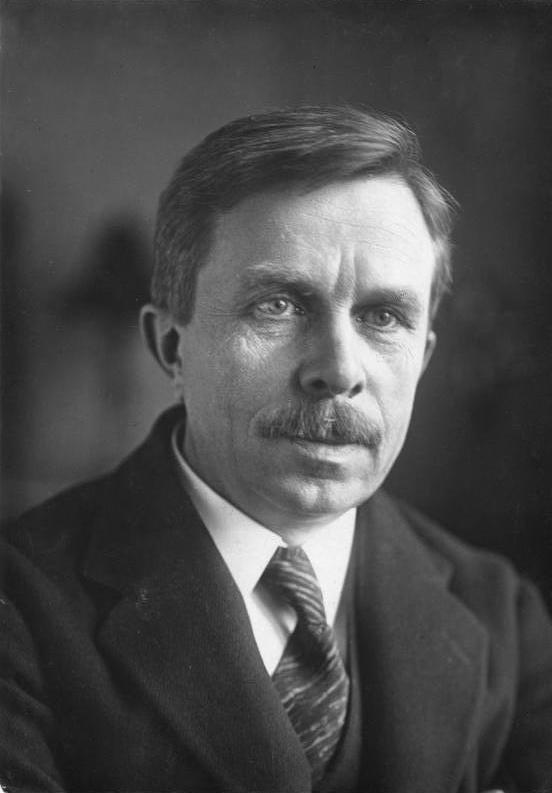
  James T. Shotwell
- John Spargo
- N. I. Stone

=== Noted lecturer and teachers (1919) ===
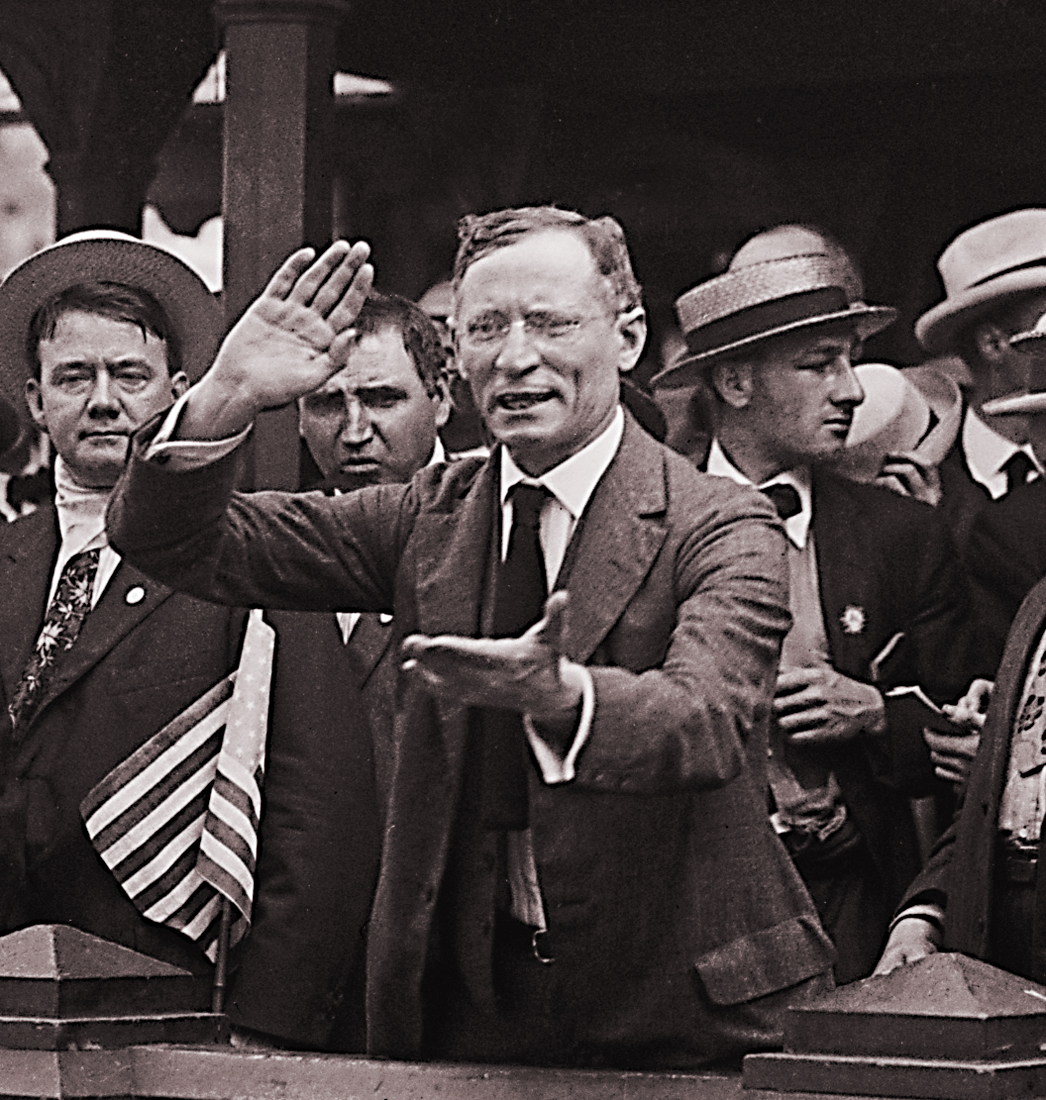
Congressman Meyer London at rally for striking Brooklyn streetcar workers (1916)

The Case for the Rand School (July 26, 1919) lists the following "noted lecturers and teachers":

- From the United States House of Representatives:
  - Meyer London (New York 12th district: Socialist)
- New York Municipal Court:
  - Judge Jacob Panken
- New York Assembly:
  - August Claessens, member
  - Abraham I. Shiplacoff, member
- From the New York Board of Aldermen:
  - B. C. Vladeck, member
- From the Pennsylvania State Federation of Labor:
  - James H. Maurer, President
- From Columbia University:
  - Charles A. Beard, historian ... now of the Bureau of Municipal Research
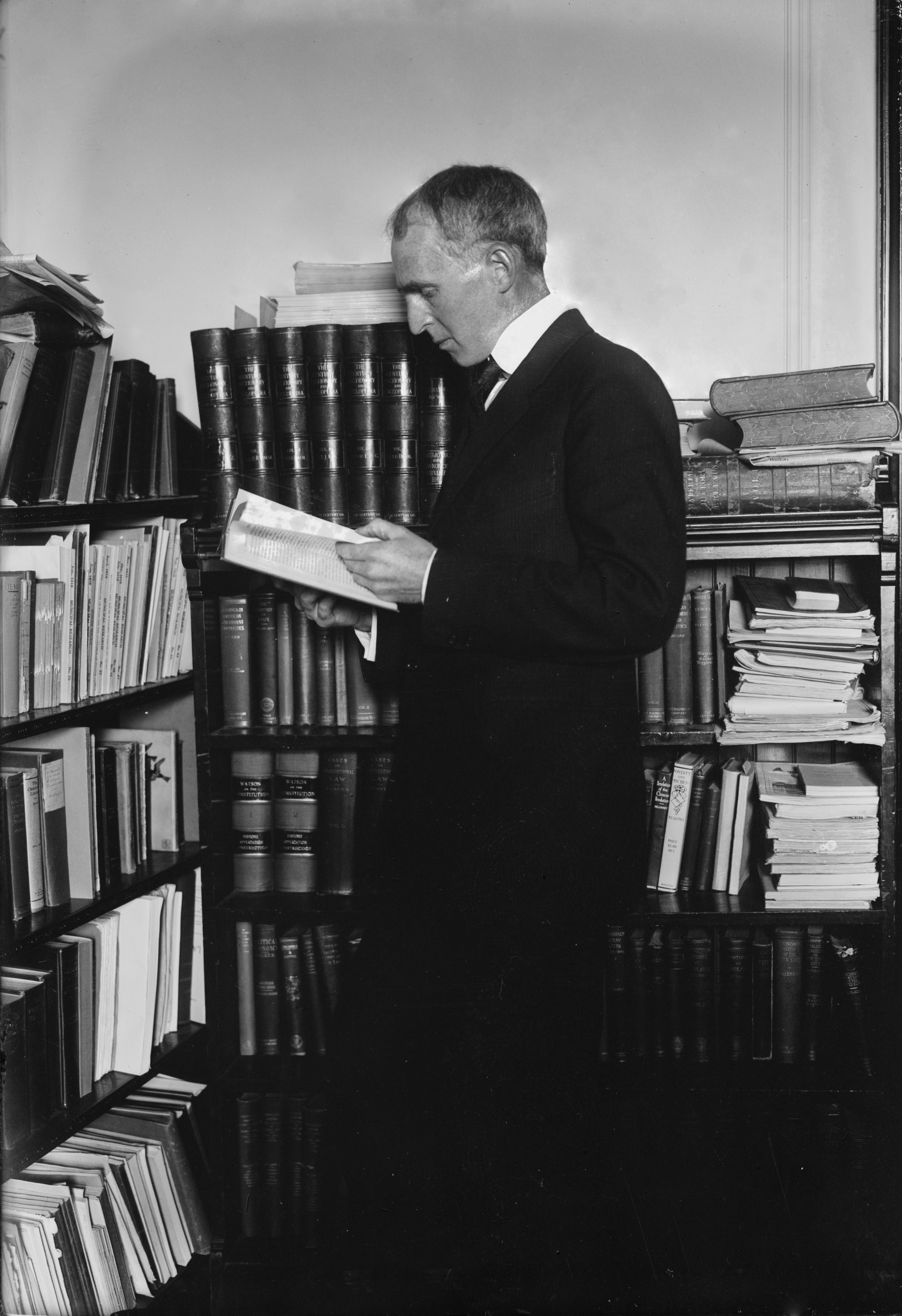
    Charles A. Beard, historian (1917)
  - Franklin H. Giddings
  - Alexander Goldenweiser
  - Benjamin B. Kendrick
  - William P. Montague
  - David Saville Muzzey
  - James Harvey Robinson
  - E. M. Sait
  - James T. Shotwell
  - Harry W. L. Dana
  - Dorothy Brewster of the Teachers' College
  - George R. Kirkpatrick of Albion College
- From Brown University:
  - Lester F. Ward, sociologist
- From Stanford University:
  - David Starr Jordan, biologist
- From New York University
  - Willard C. Fisher, economist
- From Wellesley College:
  - Ellen Hayes
  - Vida D. Scudder
- From Chicago University:
  - Charles Zueblin, lecturer and writer on municipal affairs
- From Barnard College:
  - Juliet Stuart Poyntz
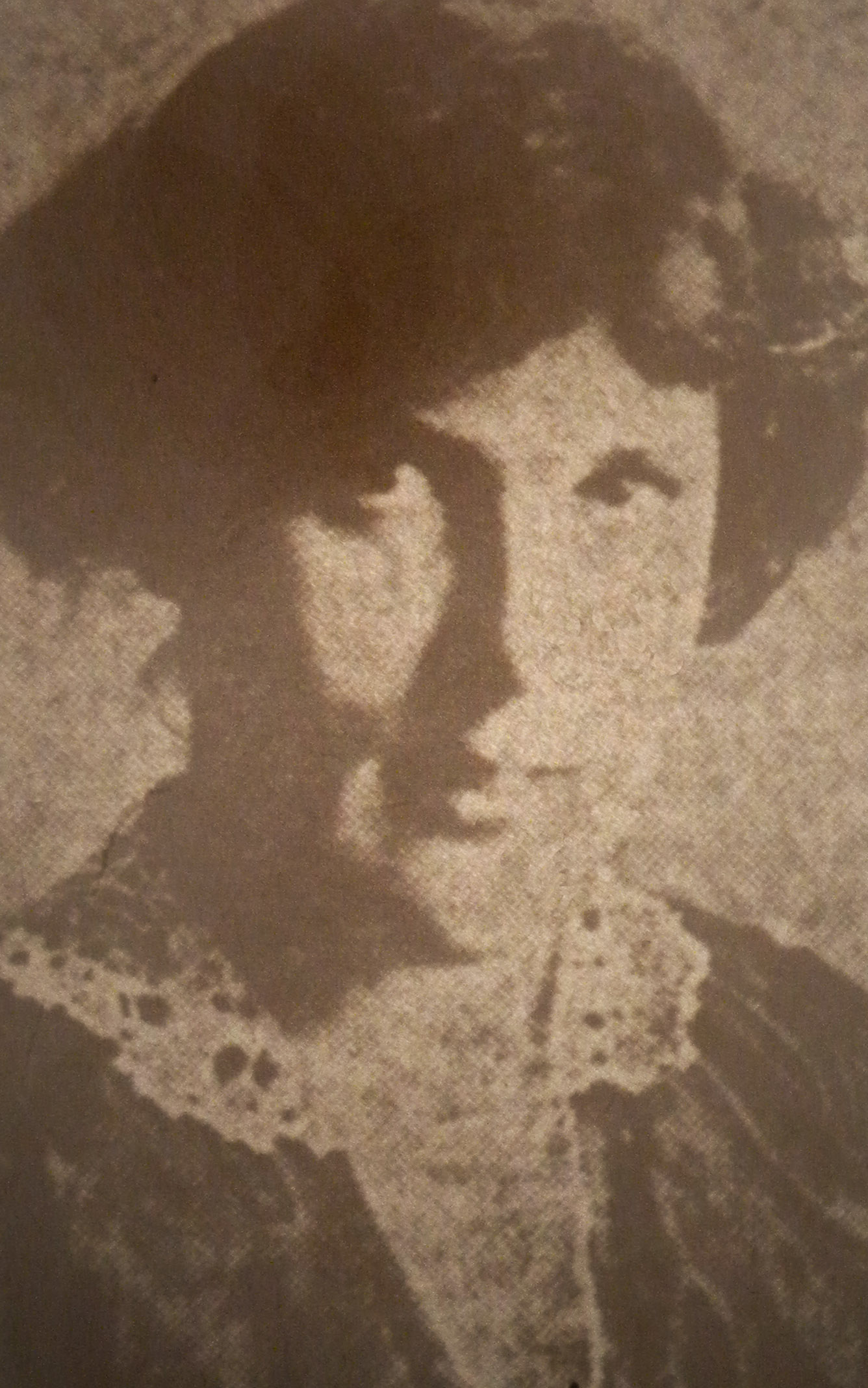
    Juliet Stuart Poyntz (1918) became a Soviet spy, who "disappeared" in New York City in 1937
- From Princeton University:
  - Evans Clark, specialist in municipal affairs
- From Dartmouth College:
  - Dr. G. B. L. Arner, statistician
- From the American Museum of Natural History:
  - Dr. Robert Lowie, anthropologist
- From the New York School of Philanthropy:
  - John Fitch, industrial expert
- From the Rockefeller Institute:
  - Dr. Phoebus A. Levene, physiological chemists
- From the Joint Board of Sanitary Control in the Garment Industry:
  - Dr. George M. Price, authority on industrial hygiene
- From the United States Commissioner of Immigration:
  - Dr. Frederic C. Howe, authority on municipal affairs
- Illinois State Federation of Labor:
  - Duncan McDonald, President
- Women's Trade Union League:
  - Alice Henry
- From the Amalgamated Clothing Workers of America:
  - Joseph Schlossberg, General Secretary
- From the International Association of Machinists:
  - James H. Duncan
- From the International Jewelry Workers' Union:
  - Samuel E. Beardsley
- From the National Consumers' League:
  - Florence Kelley
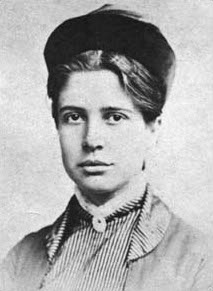
    Florence Kelley of the National Consumers' League
- From the National Child Labor Committee:
  - Owen R. Lovejoy
- From the British Steel Workers' Union:
  - John Jones
- From the British Women's Trade Union League:
  - Mary Macarthur
- From the United States Children's Bureau:
  - Helen L. Sumner (formerly of the American Association for Labor Legislation)
- From the Brooklyn Ethical Culture Society:
  - Dr. Henry Neumann
- From the Cooperative League of America:
  - Dr. James P. Warbasse, President* From the Belgian Senate:
  - Henri La Fontaine, member
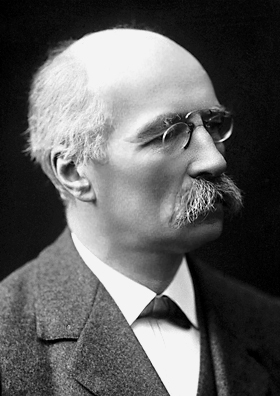
    Henri La Fontaine
- Others:
  - Dr. I. M. Rubinow, statistician and authority on Social Insurance
  - Dr. N. I. Stone, statistician and authority on tariffs and wage-rates
  - Dr. I. A. Hourwich, statistician and authority on immigration and on Russian economic conditions
  - Dr. Alexander Fichandler
  - Dr. B. C. Gruenberg
  - Jessie Wallace Hughan
  - Miss Alma Kriger
  - Dr. Gabriel R. Mason
  - Max Schonberg
  - Walter N. Polakov, prominent consulting engineer
  - Dr. John Dillon, formerly New York State Commissioner of Food and Markets
  - Morris Hillquit, lawyer, publicist, and authority on scientific Socialism
  - Dr. W. E. B. DuBois, writer and lecturer on Negro affairs
  - Lajpat Rai, Indian educator and publicist
  - Francis Sheehy-Skeffington, Irish publicist and historian
  - William Butler Yeats, Irish litterateur
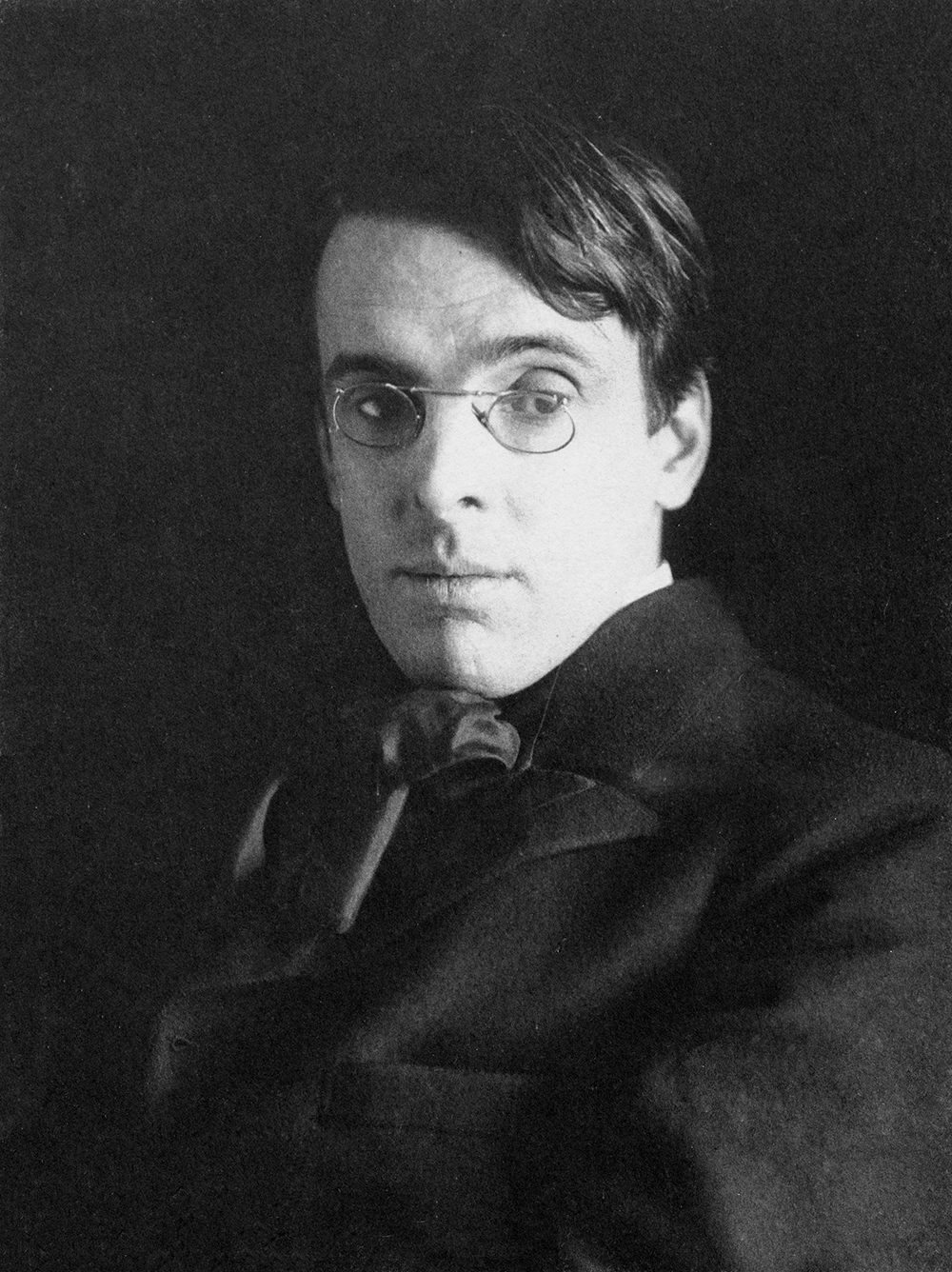
    William Butler Yeats, portrait Alice Boughton (1913)
  - Padraic Colum, Irish litterateur
  - Louis B. Boudin, lawyer and writer on scientific Socialism
  - John Spargo, writer and lecturer on scientific Socialism
  - Rev. John Haynes Holmes of the Church of the Messiah
  - Oswald Garrison Villard, publisher of The Nation
  - Robert Ferrari, lawyer and criminologist
  - Robert W. Bruere, writer on labor questions
  - Jack London, novelist
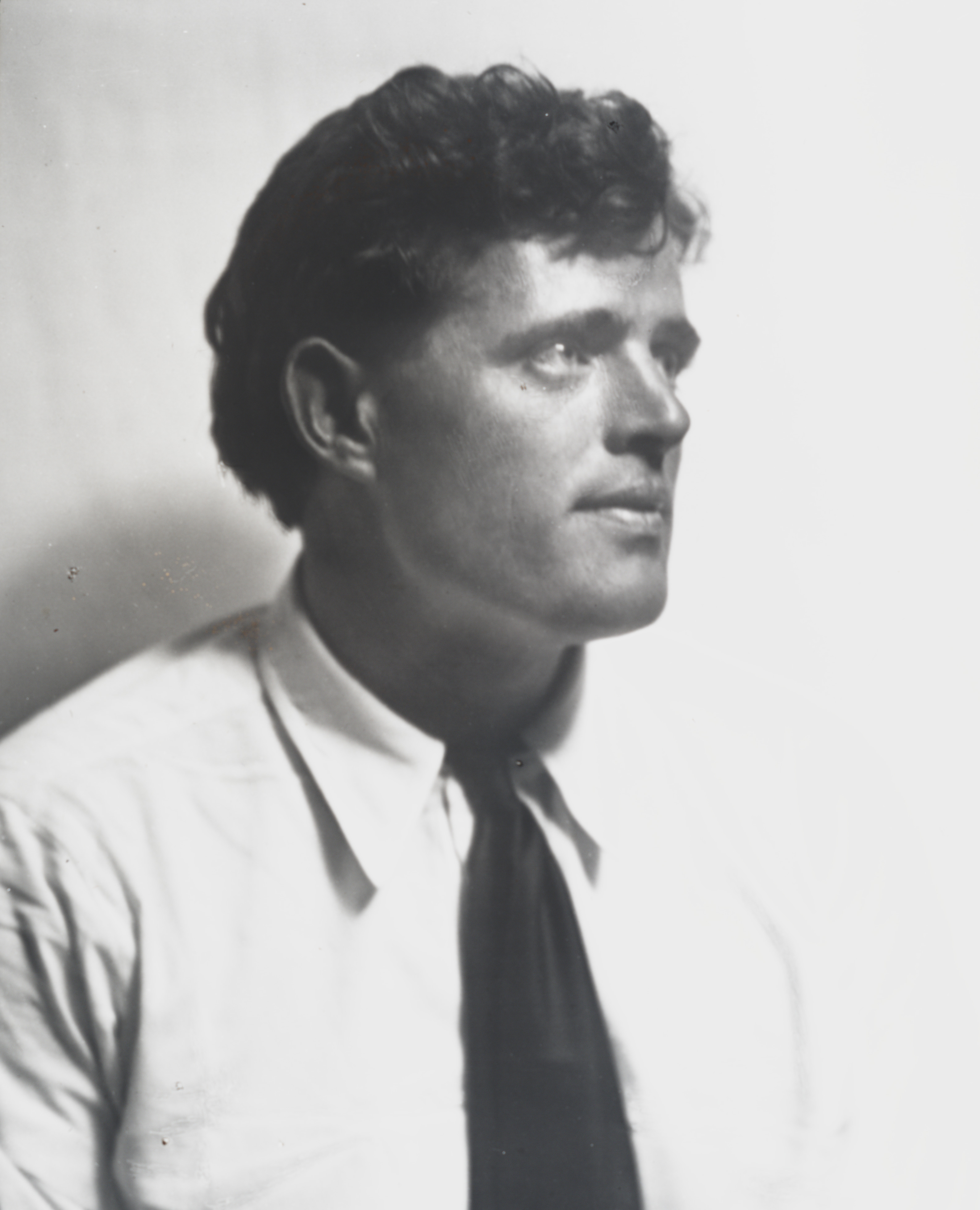
    Jack London (circa 1906-1916)
  - John D. Barry
  - Max Eastman
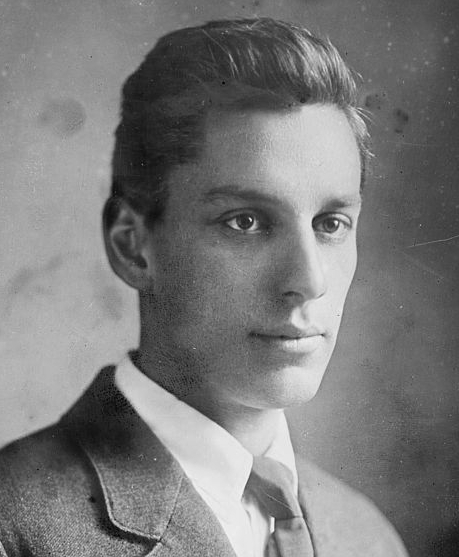
    Max Eastman
  - Charlotte Perkins Oilman
  - Muriel Hope
  - Fola La Follette
  - John Ward Stimson
  - Marion Craig Wentworth
  - Eugene Wood
  - Herman Epstein, composer and musical critic
  - Eugene Schoen, architect and lecturer on art
  - Mme. Aino Malmberg, authority on Finnish Affairs

== Disambiguation ==
The Rand School is not related to the:

- New School for Social Research, a separate and unaffiliated institution of higher learning also located in New York City
- RAND Corporation, a non-profit global-policy think tank

== See also ==
- Rose Gollup Cohen
- George D. Herron
- Camp Tamiment
- Workers Defense Union
- Work People's College (1907)
- Brookwood Labor College (1921)
- New York Workers School (1923):
  - New Workers School (1929)
  - Jefferson School of Social Science (1944)
- Highlander Research and Education Center (formerly Highlander Folk School) (1932)
  - Commonwealth College (Arkansas) (1923–1940)
  - Southern Appalachian Labor School (since 1977)
- San Francisco Workers' School (1934)
  - California Labor School (formerly Tom Mooney Labor School) (1942)
- Continuing education
- Los Angeles People's Education Center
