= Shawanga Lodge =

Hotel in Highview, New York (1887–72)

Shawanga Lodge (stylized as the Sha-Wan-Ga Lodge), was a hotel and resort in the Highview section of the town of Mamakating, Sullivan County, New York. Located on the namesake Shawanga Lodge Road east of State Route 17, the hotel operated from 1895 to 1973 as part of the Borscht Belt, a group of summer resorts in the Catskill Mountains that catered to American Jewish residents from New York City.

In September 2021 the lodge site was acquired by a land conservation group, Open Space Initiative, which stated that is intends to transfer ownership to the New York State Department of Environmental Conservation (NYSDEC).

== History ==
A fire started on the morning of November 22, 1926 in the main hotel building's fireplace. With the four-story wooden building on fire, firemen from Middletown and other nearby communities reported to put out the blaze. However, geographical limitations made it impossible to pump water from the lodge's lake to help douse the flames. The firemen stated that the entire structure would probably burn to the ground within a few hours. By 12:00 p.m., the top of the lodge was aflame and the fire reached the north side of the lowest floor. The entire building burned. The caretaker of the building, Fred Dunn, was not immediately available, resulting in concern that he had perished in the fire or left for a trip to Middletown. All other buildings at the resort were spared due to the easterly winds. Losses for the building were estimated to $150,000 (1926 USD).

== 1957 renovation ==
Construction began after the 1957 season and proceeded during the winter. Previously the hotel catered to singles, after the renovation, the hotel catered to families.
