= Tamiment Library and Robert F. Wagner Archives =

Library and archive at New York University

Coordinates: 40.7295°N 73.9973°W

The Tamiment Library is a research library at New York University that documents radical and left history, with strengths in the histories of communism, socialism, anarchism, the New Left, the Civil Rights Movement, and utopian experiments. The Robert F. Wagner Archives, which is also housed in Bobst Library at NYU, documents American labor history. Together the two units form an important center for scholarly research on labor and the left.

The Tamiment Library has a non-circulating collection of about 50,000 books, focusing on politics, political theory, labor, and radical literature and art movements. There are approximately 15,000 non-current periodical titles, including proceedings of labor union conventions, underground newspapers, internal bulletins of radical organizations, and scholarly journals. In addition, the library has a collection of about one million pamphlets and ephemera, including broadsides, leaflets, manifestos, reports, and other documents. The Tamiment Library and Wagner Archives together hold archival collections on organizations and individuals in the labor movement and left history, with special strengths in the New York City region.

== History ==
=== Tamiment Library ===
The Tamiment Library was founded in 1906 as a part of the Rand School of Social Science, a worker-education school sponsored by the American Socialist Society and modeled after the workers’ school at Ruskin College, Oxford, England. The Library was named the Meyer London Library after the long-time Socialist who represented the Lower East Side of Manhattan, and only acquired its current name in the late 1970s.

From its first days, Camp Tamiment, a theater summer camp established in 1921 in the Poconos by people associated with the School, began to support the New York institution. Between 1937 and 1956, the Camp paid from 50 to 75 percent of the School's expenses. In 1956, Camp Tamiment purchased the School, then closed it and attempted to integrate its educational and cultural programs into the Tamiment Institute. The Library remained open and was renamed the Ben Josephson Library, after the Camp's managing director.

In 1963, the Tamiment Library was donated to New York University (NYU) following the revocation of tax-exempt status of Camp Tamiment by the Internal Revenue Service. NYU saw the addition of the Tamiment collection as a means to expand its scope as a research library. Through the early 1970s the collection was housed in a brick building owned by the Machinists' Union on Manhattan's West 15th Street. By the late 1970s the location of the collection had moved to Elmer Holmes Bobst Library of NYU.

The first professional librarian to be associated with the Tamiment collection was Louise Heinze, who would be succeeded by Dorothy Swanson late in the 1960s. Swanson would remain in this position for 27 years, expanding the collection greatly by actively seeking out and obtaining the papers of political activists and organizations of both the historic as well as the emerging New Left. Staff hiring was broadly ecumenical, including collection assistants Ethel Lobman, a longtime member of the Trotskyist Socialist Workers Party and Peter Filardo, formerly an employee of the Communist Party-associated American Institute for Marxist Studies, founded by historian Herbert Aptheker. These two archivists were instrumental in obtaining major additions to NYU's collection from these seminal "Old Left" organizations.

=== Robert F. Wagner Labor Archives ===
The idea for a single archive to preserve the records of New York City's vibrant trade union movement was first advanced in the early 1970s by Stephen Charney Vladeck, son of Socialist trade union activist Baruch Charney Vladeck. Vladeck, a prominent labor lawyer, was concerned about inadequate scholarship and teaching about the history of the labor movement and saw the need for establishment of a central repository for historical documents. Vladeck was able to make use of personal connections to convince the New York Central Labor Council (CLC) and the Tamiment Institute, still headed by Ben Josephson, to co-sponsor the creation of the new labor archive.

In 1977, New York University was brought on board and together the three entities established the new labor archive, named after Senator Robert F. Wagner Sr. of New York, sponsor of the National Labor Relations Act of 1935, legislation which guaranteed workers the basic right to organize trade unions.

The Central Labor Council's support was especially critical to the success of the Robert F. Wagner Labor Archives as was the use of the Wagner name, as it gave mainstream legitimacy to the effort and helped to motivate several fairly conservative unions to provide document accessions to the collection. The "Tamiment" name had been closely associated with the Socialist Party and New York University was not perceived as friendly to the interests of organized labor – a pair of potential stumbling blocks which were neatly alleviated by the alternative name and official support of the CLC.

The Wagner Labor Archive hired its first employee, Larry Cary, in 1978 and made use of grant money from the Rockefeller Foundation and the National Endowment for the Humanities to help launch the project. Succeeding Cary at the helm of the Labor Archive was labor historian Debra Bernhardt, who later took over for Dorothy Swanson as head of the combined Tamiment Library and Robert F. Wagner Archives. Bernhardt died in 2001 at the age of 47 and was in turn succeeded, following an extensive search, by labor historian and archivist Michael H. Nash in 2002. Nash was responsible for acquiring the archives of the Communist Party USA for preservation.

=== Major acquisitions ===
The Abraham Lincoln Brigade Archives (ALBA) collection, formerly located at Brandeis University, was acquired by the Tamiment Library in 2001. The collection is the largest and most important resource for the study of the participation of American volunteers in the Spanish Civil War. It includes the papers of more than 200 volunteers, oral histories, films, photographs, posters, and selections of the microfilmed records of the International Brigades that were taken to the Soviet Union after the Spanish Civil War.

In March 2007, the archives of the Communist Party USA were donated to the library. The massive donation came in over 2,000 cartons, and included 20,000 books and pamphlets – some of which dated from the founding of the party – as well as thousands of photographs from the archives of the Daily Worker. The library also holds a copy of the microfilmed archive of Communist Party documents from Russian State Archives of Social and Political History held by the Library of Congress.

Also notable was the acquisition of the papers of former Central Intelligence Agency officer Philip Agee, a defector to Cuba, as well as the papers of black civil rights activists Esther and James Jackson, Nation magazine editor Victor Navasky, and papers of radical lawyer William Kunstler and historian Howard Zinn.

=== Collection in the 21st century ===
As of 2013, the collection of the Tamiment Library and Robert F. Wagner Archives included more than 100,000 pamphlets, as well as other radical ephemera.

== See also ==
- Rand School of Social Science
