= Lou Menchell =

American comedian and emcee

Lou Menchell was an American comedian and emcee who used Yiddish humor in his impersonations, songs, and standup.

== Career ==
Menchell began most of his comedic standup in the Borscht Belt, what is now known as the Catskills, a destination of mostly New York City Jews from the 1920s to the 1970s. The Catskills acted as a sanctuary for Jewish people who had the option to either become Americanized or embrace and preserve their Jewishness. Jewish-American humor grew in the Catskills, where any Jewish comedian worth a laugh got his or her start, in which Menchell became very familiar with. The retreat was formerly branded as Borscht Belt due to the performers representing their comedy often with self-deprecating with rapid-fire style. Borscht Belt provided various forms of entertainment from burlesque to nightclub to broadway. Along with Menchell, comedians such as Buddy Hackett, Sid Caesar, and Jerry Lewis got their start in Borscht Belt—along with lesser but still popular comics such as Mal Lawrence, Corbett Monica, Freddy Roman, and London Lee. Up in the Catskills, Menchell delivered the song “Love is Great” in which he ridicules himself for being married while channeling the talents of the late musician, Ben Bernie. The Catskills gave comedians such as Menchell grounds to perform and master their craft. The comedians delivered Yiddish humor to a customized Jewish crowd that would always accept and react kindly to the punch lines.

Menchell continued to use his Jewish religion as an advantage throughout his career. Thinking critically about Jewish or “Yiddish” humor, it can be categorized as “one of self-criticism or inwardly directed ridicule.” Menchell demonstrates this stereotyped humor in many of his comic songs such as 1954’s “All I Want for Chanukah is Marilyn Monroe.” Menchell jokingly uses lyrics such as “If you wanna make me look good/ And show I’m not just John Doe/ Well all I want for Hanukah is Marilyn Monroe” and “If you wanna raise my prestige/And let me show that I’m no schmo/ Well all I want for Hanukah is Marilyn Monroe.” In a 1955 issue of Billboard, the song gets an honorable mention for being on the spotlight and is described as a “Yiddish type piece of material that is cleverly written and neatly performed. [The song] Could do business in major population centers where there is a large Yiddish clientele for disk shops. It is also important to note that Lou Menchell credits The Mambonicks as a featured artist in this song. Mambonicks were a “toned down version of mambo, without acrobatics and was taught at dance studios, resort hotels, and nightclubs. Mambo allowed the opportunity for people of different ethnicities and socio-economic backgrounds to dance as one and it is said to have brought Afro-Americans, Irish, Italians, and Jews together. By incorporating his own version of Mambonicks, Menchell is reaching a wider audience and attempting to target more than just his typical Jewish people. Menchell continues to incorporate Yiddish humor in songs such as “She Was Out With A Mambo,” which is a “parody on the Vaughn Monroe click. Through Menchell’s songs and humor he has reached a wide audience and made a name for himself in the rise of comedy.

== Personal life ==
Lou Menchell married Vicki Stuart, a British music-hall singer. Together, they had two children, son Ivan--a Hollywood producer known for The Nanny--was born in November of 1960 and Son Roland who is living in Los Angeles, their son Andrew died from crib death at ten weeks old in 1967.

== Legacy ==
Lou Menchell died in 1979 although his legacy still lives on through his sons. Ivan Menchell has become an established playwright in the present entertainment field. His 1994 play, “Smiling Through,” was created specifically for his mother, Vicki after she stopped performing due to Lou’s death. The play mirrors Stuart’s real life as it depicts the story of a woman who resumes her career after a hiatus inspired by her husband’s death. Ivan Menchell granted his mother with the ability to go back to performing in front of a large audience, something that she used to do with her husband, Lou.

Lou Menchell was among the few greats that catapulted off of using Yiddish humor to make a name for themselves. From starting in the Catskills fixating on Borscht Belt humor, Menchell was able to become a household name to a wide Jewish audience. He incorporated his humor into songs and musical numbers where he would ridicule his Jewishness in a comical way. Menchell is in a category of the greats and has allowed future comedians and performers to craft his skills and talents for himself.
