= Rose Gollup Cohen =

American writer

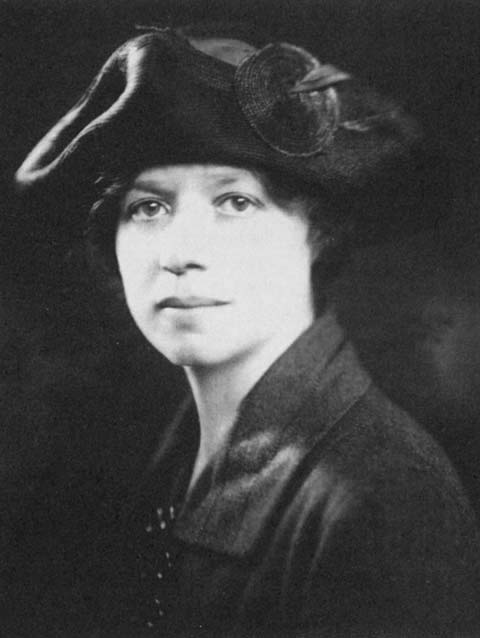

Rose Gollup Cohen (1880–1925) was a writer. She grew up in a village in the Russian Empire, immigrated to America with her aunt Masha in 1892 to join her father, and lived on New York City's Lower East Side. She worked in a garment sweatshop, joined a union, and also worked as a domestic servant. She suffered from poor health, and was at one point visited by Lillian Wald, who sent her to uptown Presbyterian Hospital, where she met people who sponsored summer outings for immigrant children. She then worked summers at a Connecticut retreat. Wald also referred her to a cooperative shirtwaist shop directed by Leonora O'Reilly, and when O'Reilly began teaching at the Manhattan Trade School for Girls in 1902, she recruited Cohen as her assistant.

Cohen attended classes at Breadwinners' College at the Educational Alliance, the Rand School of Social Science, and University Extension at Columbia University.

In 1918 Cohen published her autobiography, Out of the Shadow: A Russian Jewish Girlhood on the Lower East Side, which was well-received and appeared in French and Russian as well as English. She also wrote five short pieces published in New York literary magazines, and three published in Philadelphia magazines, between 1918 and 1922. One short story of hers, "Natalka's Portion," was reprinted six times, and appeared in Best Short Stories of 1922. In 1923 and 1924 Cohen met Lilla Cabot Perry and Edwin Arlington Robinson while attending the MacDowell Colony.

She died under mysterious circumstances, perhaps a suicide, and Anzia Yezierska wrote a thinly veiled short story about her, called Wild Winter Love (1927), that ended in suicide.
