= William Mailly =

American socialist political functionary, journalist and trade union activist

Will Mailly was an early National Executive Secretary of the Socialist Party of America.

William Mailly (November 22, 1871 – September 4, 1912) was an American socialist political functionary, journalist, and trade union activist. He is best remembered as the second National Executive Secretary of the Socialist Party of America and as the first managing editor of the socialist daily newspaper, the New York Call.

== Biography ==
=== Early years ===
William Mailly was born November 22, 1871, in Pittsburgh, Pennsylvania. Mailly's parents emigrated to Liverpool, England when the boy was 2, and so the American-born Mailly was raised in English schools—an extremely rare pattern of emigration for an American radical activist. He worked in Liverpool from a very early age as an errand boy.

Mailly returned to the United States in July 1889, working briefly in a brickyard and on a railway before moving to Alabama in 1890 to take up work as a coal miner. Mailly became involved in the trade union movement as a member of the United Mine Workers of America in 1893.

Mailly took part in a coal strike in 1894, an activity which resulted in his blacklisting from the Alabama coal mines.

=== Political career ===
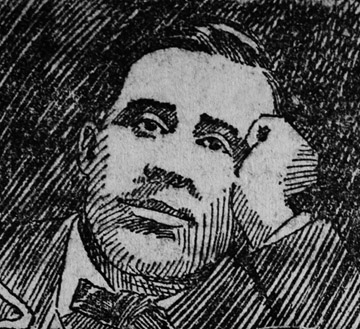
William Mailly as he appeared in a drawing in the Appeal to Reason in 1903.

Following his blacklisting from the mines, Mailly began to work as an organizer on behalf of the UMWA and the Socialist Party of America.

Mailly was first a member of the People's Party, serving as a delegate to the Alabama state convention of that party and to its national convention in 1894.

Mailly turned his hand to labor journalism, taking a job as associate editor of the Birmingham Labor Advocate in May 1895 and serving at that post for about a year. Thereafter, he moved to Nashville, Tennessee. In 1896, he joined the Socialist Labor Party of America (SLP), but his stay in that organization proved to be short-lived, as he left the SLP in July of the subsequent year to join the Social Democracy of America, an organization which included Victor L. Berger and Eugene V. Debs. Mailly organized a branch of the Social Democracy in July 1897 and was a delegate from Alabama to the 1898 Convention of this organization.

From there Mailly moved to the socialist enclave of Haverhill, Massachusetts, where he served as secretary of the SDP's state and municipal campaign committees. Mailly also worked as the editor of the Haverhill Social Democrat in 1898. He was elected State Secretary of the Socialist Party of Massachusetts in 1902.

After his time in Massachusetts, Mailly moved on to New York City, remaining engaged in politics there. He was a founding member of the Socialist Party of America (SPA) in 1901. That same year he attended the Annual Convention of the American Federation of Labor.

Will Mailly in 1904.

The January 1903 meeting of the governing National Committee of the SPA elected Mailly as the new Nati Secretary of the party, and he assumed these duties the following month. The same meeting moved the headquarters of the party to Omaha, Nebraska, and so Mailly moved there forthwith. Mailly was reelected as National Secretary of the Socialist Party in 1904 and continued in that position until 1905.

After declining to run for national secretary in 1905, Mailly went to work for the Left Wing Socialist Hermon F. Titus as Business Manager of The Socialist, Titus' weekly, which he had recently relocated to Toledo, Ohio from Washington state. Mailly left that publication sometime around the first of June 1906, thereafter moving to New York City. Mailly also served as a member of the National Executive Committee of the SPA from 1905 to 1906.

Mailly finished up his life back in New York City, first as associate editor of the socialist weekly The Worker (1906–1907) before becoming managing editor of its successor the New York Call (1908–1909). He then moved to the mass-circulation monthly The Metropolitan Magazine where he was to contribute an article each month on the topic of socialism.

=== Death and legacy ===
Shortly after his move to The Metropolitan Magazine, Mailly's health began to fail.

Mailly died September 4, 1912, at the age of 40. He was survived by his wife, Bertha Howell Mailly, whom he married in 1898.

== Works ==
- "The Movement from January 1 to July 1, 1903," Appeal to Reason [Girard, KS], whole no. 405 (Sept. 5, 1903), pg. 2.
- "The Socialist Movement in the United States," in F.W. Pethick Lawrence and Joseph Edwards (eds.), The Reformers' Year Book: 1904 (vol. 10). London: The Echo, 1904; pp. 70–71.
- "Trade Union and Socialist Movement in the United States," in F.W. Pethick Lawrence and Joseph Edwards (eds.), The Reformers' Year Book: 1905 (vol. 11). London: The Echo, 1905; pp. 156–158.
- "The Socialist View," in "Lessons of the Election: A Symposium," To-Morrow: A Monthly Hand-Book of the Changing Order, vol. 1, no. 1 (January 1905), pp. 39–40.
