= Tannen's Magic Shop =

Magic shop in New York City

Coordinates: 40°44′58.64″N 73°59′13.25″W

Tannen's Magic Shop is the oldest operating magic shop in New York City. It was founded by Louis Tannen in 1925. The shop sponsors Tannen's Magic Camp, a summer camp for young magicians held since 1974, Tannen's Magic Shop Jubilee convention, where the LOUIE award is given and Tannen's Magic School in New York City.
