= Borscht Belt =

Cultural region of New York, US

- Cultural region
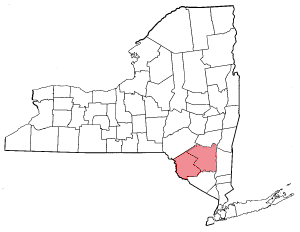
- Map of New York State with the counties that constituted the Borscht Belt highlighted
- Country: United States
- State: New York

The Borscht Belt, or Yiddish Alps, is a region of the U.S. state of New York that had summer resorts catering to American Jewish vacationers, especially residents of New York City. The resorts, most later defunct, were located in the southern foothills of the Catskill Mountains in parts of Sullivan and Ulster counties, bordering the northern edges of the New York metropolitan area.

A 2019 review of the history is more specific: "in its heyday, as many as 500 resorts catered to guests of various incomes." These resorts, as well as the Borscht Belt bungalow colonies, were a popular vacation spot for New York City Jews from the 1920s through the 1960s. By the late 1950s, many began closing, with most gone by the 1970s, but some major resorts continued to operate, a few into the 2010s.

== Name ==
The name comes from borscht, a soup of Ukrainian origin, made with beets as the main ingredient, giving it a deep reddish-purple color, that is popular in many Central and Eastern European countries and brought by Ashkenazi Jewish and Slavic immigrants to the United States. The alliterative name was coined by Abel Green, editor of Variety starting in 1933, and is a play on existing colloquial names for other American regions, such as the Bible Belt and Rust Belt. An alternate name, the Yiddish Alps, was used by Larry King and is satirical: a classic example of borscht belt humor.

== History ==
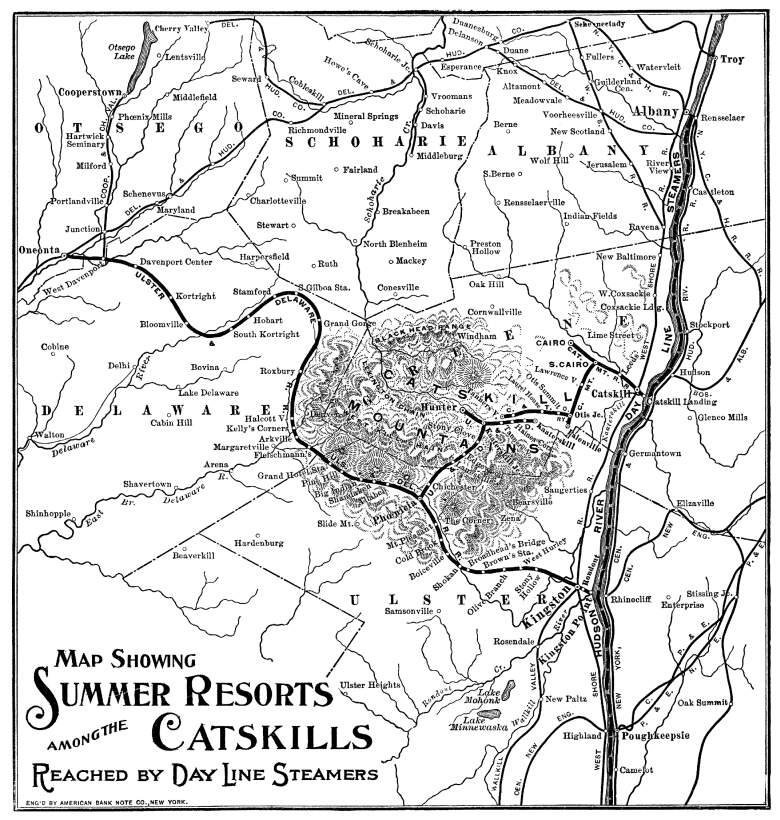
The rail network in the Catskills with summer resorts, ca. 1901

After the expansion of the railway system including the tracks Ontario and Western as well as the Ulster and Delaware Railroad, the area of the Catskill Mountains became a tourist destination because of the beauty of the landscape, which impressed the painters of American Romanticism, and because of the rising popularity of fly fishing in its trout-rich rivers. As New York City streets would bake in the summer and air-conditioning was not yet available, people flocked to the Catskills.

In the early 1900s, some hotels' and resorts' advertisements refused to accept Jews and indicated "No Hebrews or Consumptives" in their ads. This discrimination led to a need for alternative lodging that would readily accept Jewish families as guests. Visits to the area by Jewish families were already underway "as early as the 1890s ... Tannersville ... was 'a great resort of our Israelite breathren [sic]' ... from the 1920s on [there were] hundreds of hotels." The larger hotels provided "Friday night and holiday services as well as kosher cooking", thus supporting religious families to take a vacation in accordance to their customs.

=== Rise ===
Borscht Belt hotels, bungalow colonies, summer camps, and kuchaleyns (kuch-alein, literally: "Cook it yourself", a Yiddish name for self-catered boarding houses) flourished. The bungalows usually included "a kitchen/living room/dinette, one bedroom, and a screened porch" with entertainment at the communal center, called the casino, being simple: bingo or a movie. The kuchaleyns were often visited by lower middle-class and working-class Jewish New Yorkers. Because of the many Jewish guests, this area was nicknamed the Yiddish Alps or Solomon County, a malapropism of Sullivan County, by many people who visited there.

The Concord Hotel, Kiamesha Lake, dining room, 1978

A sufficient choice of Jewish cuisine was an important feature of the hotels in the Borscht Belt, and "too much was not enough" developed as a notion. Jonathan Sarna wrote: "To understand the emphasis on food, one has to understand hunger. Immigrants had memories of hunger, and in the Catskills, the food seemed limitless." The singles scene was also important; many hotels hired young male college students to attract single girls of a similar age. One book on the era contended that "the Catskills became one great marriage broker."

Borscht Belt resorts stood in towns such as Liberty, Fallsburg, Mamakating, Thompson, Bethel and Rockland in Sullivan County as well as Wawarsing and Rochester in Ulster County. Such resorts included Avon Lodge, Brickman's, Brown's, Butler Lodge, The Concord, Grossinger's, Granit, the Heiden Hotel, Irvington, Kutsher's Hotel and Country Club, the Nevele, Friar Tuck Inn, the Laurels Hotel and Country Club, the Pines Resort, Raleigh Hotel, the Overlook, the Tamarack Lodge, Shady Nook Hotel and Country Club, Stevensville, Stier's Hotel, and the Windsor. Some of these hotels originated from farms that Jewish immigrants had established in the early part of the 20th century.

Two of the larger hotels in High View, just north of Bloomingburg, were the Shawanga Lodge and the Overlook. One of the high points of Shawanga Lodge's existence came in 1959 when it was the site of a conference of scientists researching laser beams. The conference marked the start of serious research into lasers. The hotel burned to the ground in 1973. The Overlook, which offered rooms in the main building as well as bungalows, spiced up with entertainment, was operated by the Schrier family.

Impressions from the late 1970s by John Margolies

A view from the Granit hotel,
Kerhonkson, 1977

The Nevele hotel lobby,
Ellenville, 1978

A room at Kutcher's,
Monticello, 1977

Brickman's pool area,
South Fallsburg, 1977

Grossinger's ping pong,
Liberty, 1977

Folk dancing at Menges' Lakeside,
Livingston Manor, 1977

=== Decline ===
The Borscht Belt reached its peak in the 1950s and 60s with over 500 resorts, 50,000 bungalows, and 1,000 rooming houses. By the late 1960s, the start of a decline was apparent. "Railways began cutting service to the area, the popularity of air travel increased, and a younger generation of Jewish-Americans chose other leisure destinations." A secondary factor was that "anti-Semitism declined, so Jews could go other places." Official Sullivan County historian John Conway blames the decline on "the three ‘A’s: air conditioning, assimilation, and airfare".

Access to the area improved with the opening of the George Washington Bridge and upgrade of old travel routes such as old New York State Route 17. On the other hand, passenger train access ended with the September 1953 termination of passenger trains on the Ontario and Western Railway mainline from Roscoe at the northern edge of Sullivan County, through the Borscht Belt, to Weehawken, New Jersey. A 1940 vacation travel guide published by the railroad listed hundreds of establishments that were situated at or near the railway's stations.

In 1941, the New York Central ceased running passenger trains on its Catskill Mountain Branch. The area suffered as a travel destination in the late 1950s and especially by the 1960s. Another source confirms that "cheap air travel suddenly allowed a new generation to visit more exotic and warmer destinations." More women remained in the workforce after marriage and could not take off for the entire summer to relocate to the Catskills.

A Times of Israel article specifies that "the bungalow colonies were the first to go under, followed by the smaller hotels. The glitziest ones hung on the longest" with some continuing to operate in the 1980s and even in the 1990s. Bungalow colonies fell into disrepair or many of the nicer ones have been converted into a housing co-op. The Concord Resort Hotel, which outlasted most other resorts, went bankrupt in 1997 but survived until 1998 and was subsequently demolished for a possible casino site. By the early 1960s, some 25 to 30 percent of Grossinger's Catskill Resort Hotel visitors were not Jewish; nevertheless it closed in 1986.

The Stevensville Hotel in Swan Lake was located on the shores of an artificial reservoir of the West Branch Mongaup River which had fed a tannery since the 1840s. It was commissioned in 1924 and managed by the Dinnerstein and Friehling families until around 1990. It reopened as Swan Lake Resort Hotel in 1999, offering Asian cuisine plus tennis and golf facilities and survived until 2007. In 2015, the ultra-Orthodox Congregation Iched Anash bought the property for $2.2 million and began to operate the Satmar Boys Camp, a religious summer school (yeshiva gedolah).

In 1987, New York City mayor Ed Koch proposed buying the Gibber Hotel in Kiamesha Lake to house the homeless. The idea was opposed by local officials and the hotel instead became the religious school Yeshiva Viznitz.

The Granit Hotel and Country Club, located in Kerhonkson, boasted many amenities, including a golf course. It closed in 2015 and was renovated and turned into the Hudson Valley Resort and Spa, which closed in 2018. The property was sold in May 2019 to Hudson Valley Holding Co. LLC. The company did not announce its plans for the hotel.

== 21st century ==
As of the 2010s, the region was a summer home for many Orthodox Jewish families. Some of the hotels have been converted into rehab centers, meditation centers or Orthodox Jewish hotels and resorts. The former Homowack Lodge in Phillipsport was converted into a summer camp for Hasidic girls. Officials of the state Department of Health ordered the property evacuated in July 2009, citing health and safety violations. The camp owners initially resisted, but left for good that August. The property was unoccupied for many years and the main lodge burned down in 2023. The Flagler Hotel, Nemerson, Schenk's and Windsor Hotels in South Fallsburg, and the Stevensville Hotel in Swan Lake, were converted into Jewish religious summer camps.

In Fleischmanns, Oppenheimer's Regis Hotel serves an Orthodox clientele in a building dating back to the heyday of the Borscht Belt.

In 1984, the Catskills division of Hatzalah was founded which covers the Borscht Belt and served the needs of a growing Orthodox clientele. As of 2020 a volunteer force of 450 rescue workers and paramedics is operating a fleet of 18 ambulances. Although financially independent from the other chapters, it cooperates in day-to-day business with Central Hatzalah of NYC as the 17. neighborhood and with State Forces (police, forest rangers, emergency medical services, fire departments).

Many Buddhist and Hindu retreat centers have been constructed on the land or in the restored buildings of former camps or resorts to serve adherents in New York City, the establishment of which has then drawn even more temples and centers to the area. This led to the coining of the nicknames "Buddha Belt," "Bhajan Belt" and "Buddhist Belt" to refer to the area's revival.

Despite the region's decline as a cultural epicenter, a handful of traveling acts, such as the Doox of Yale, a Yale University acappella group, continued to regularly tour the Borscht Belt as recently as 2015.

On August 7, 2025, the Yamim Ba’im music festival, starring Orthodox Israeli superstar Ishay Ribo, took place at Bethel Woods Center for the Arts, the same site as the 1969 Woodstock Festival.

Abandoned hotel buildings

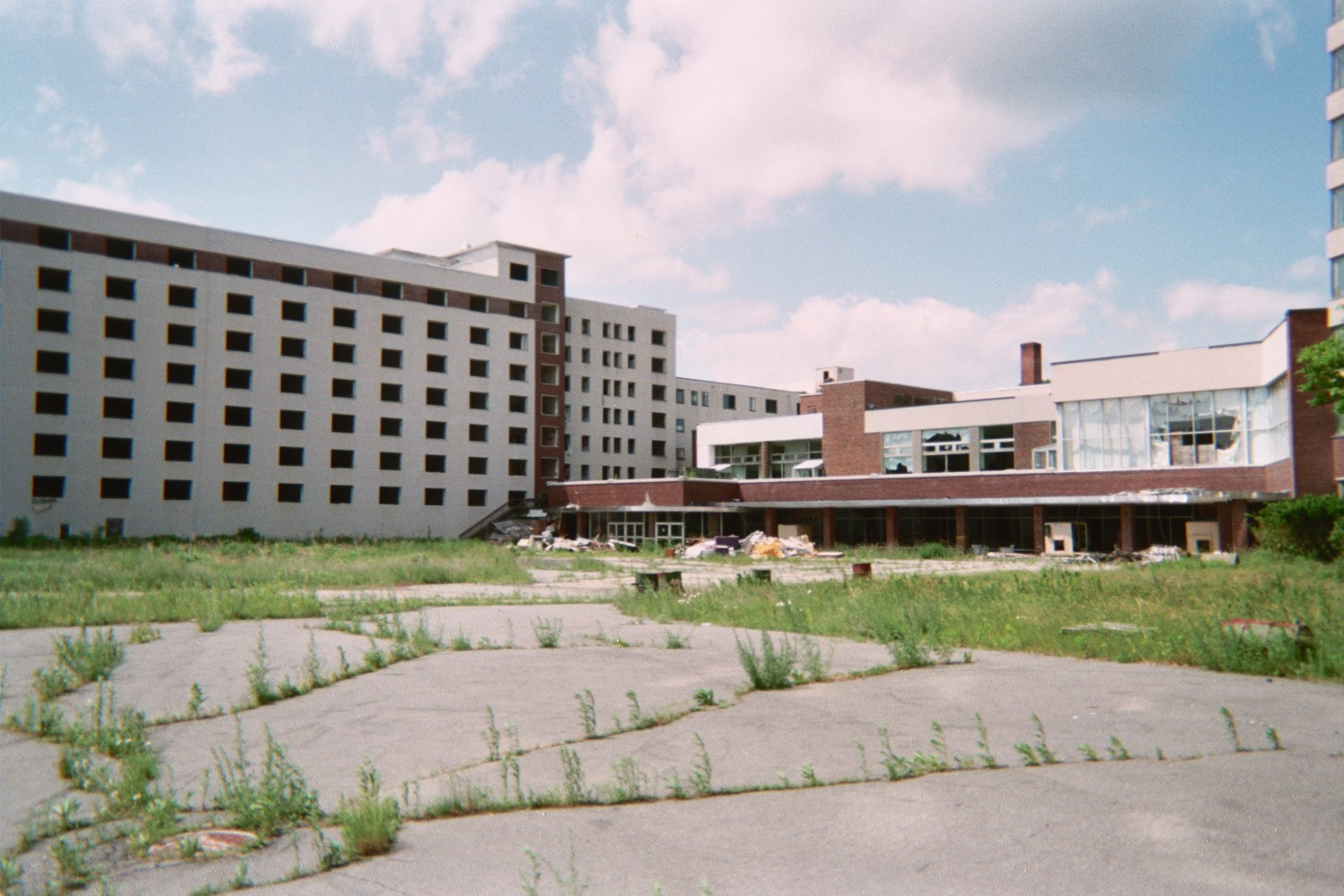
The Concord hotel, 2005

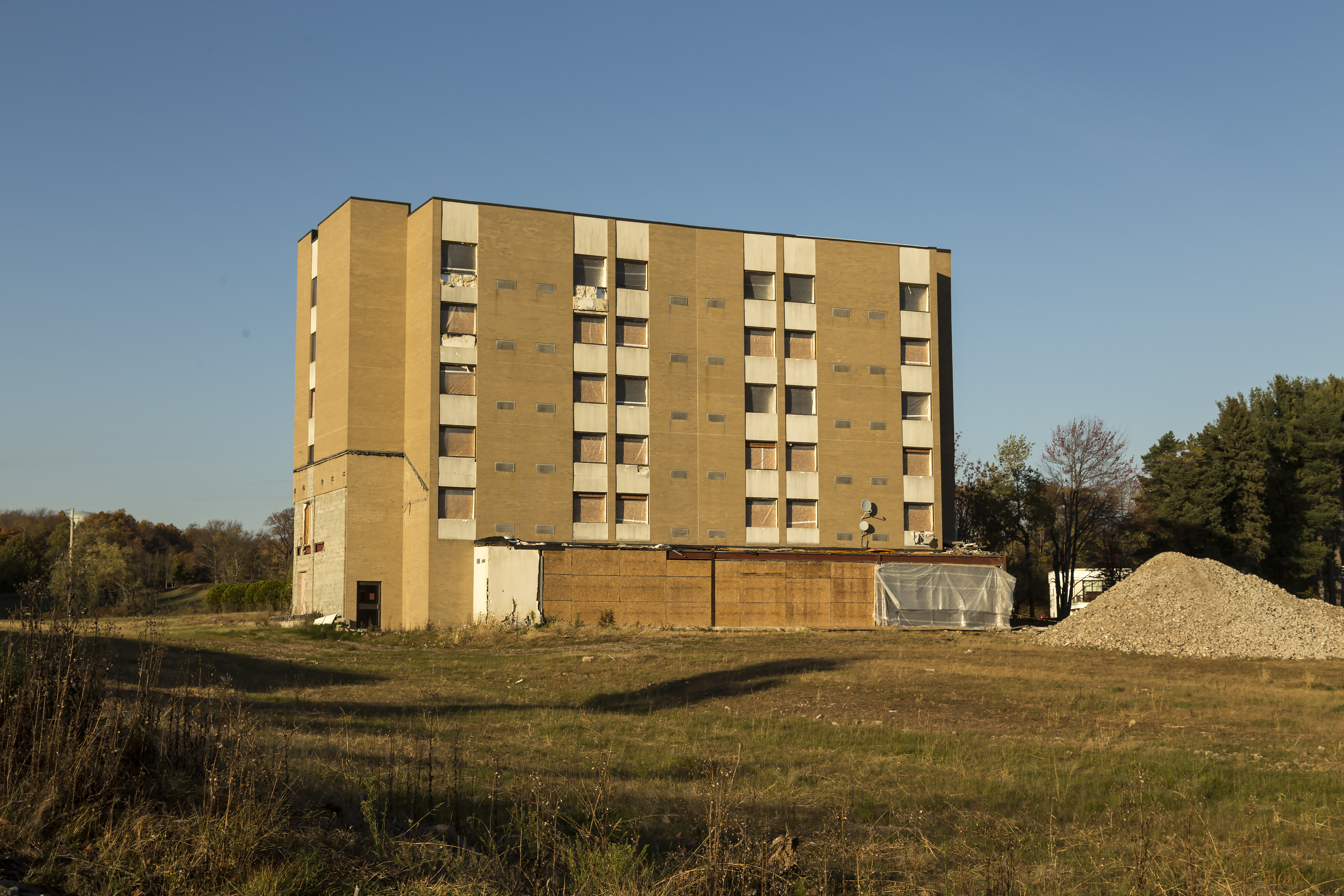
Kutsher's hotel, 2015

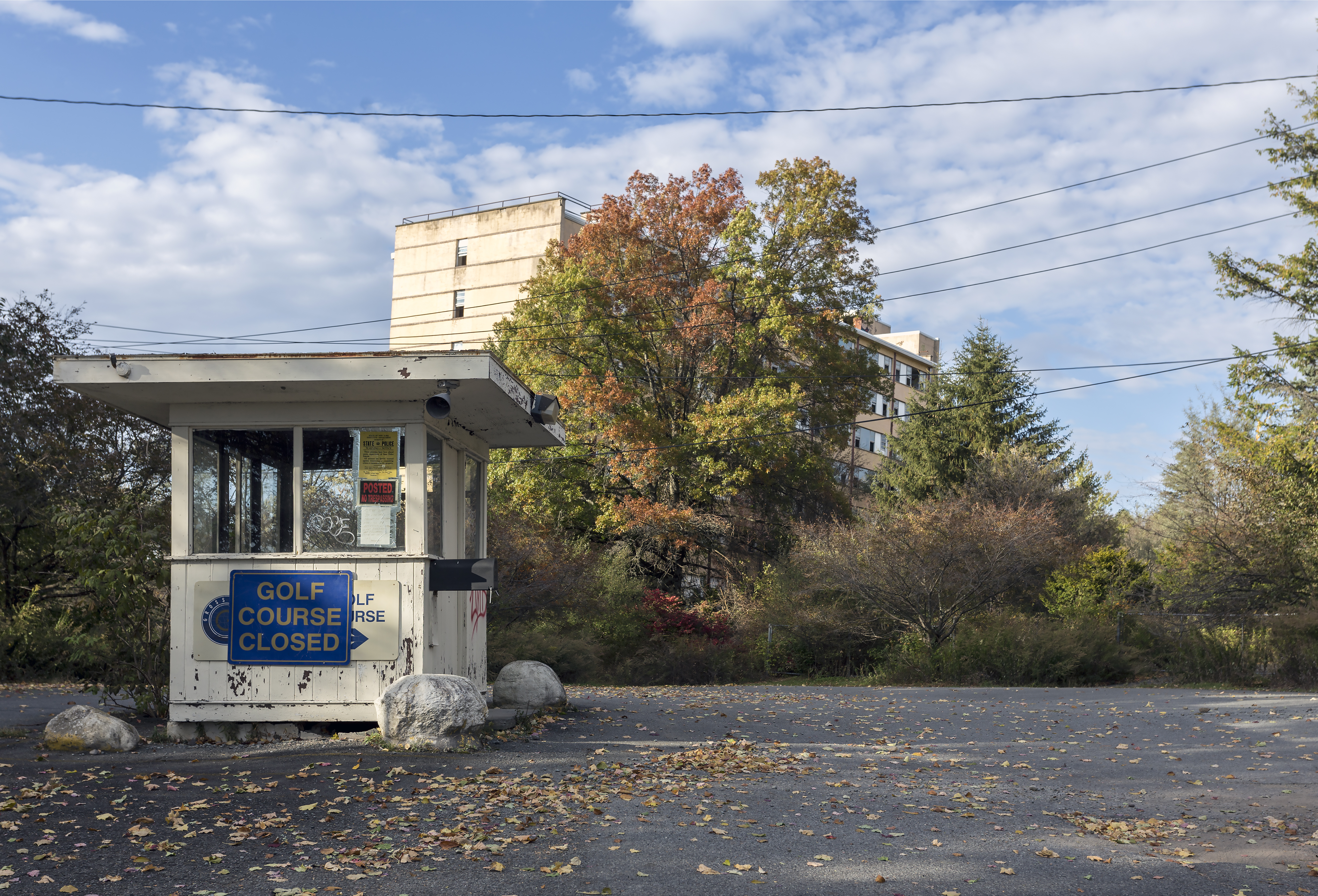
Grossinger's resort, 2015

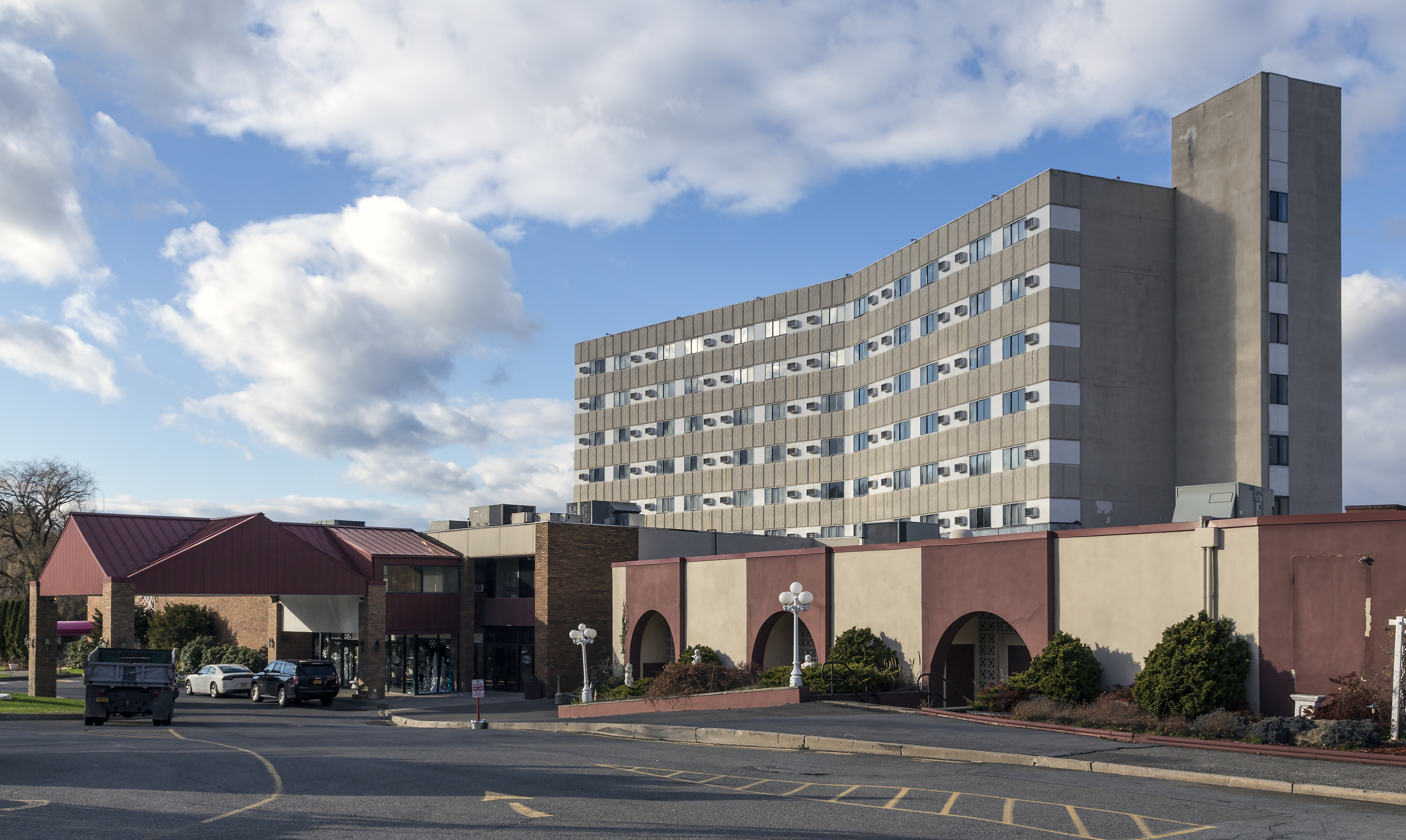
The Granit resort, 2015

Between 2013 and 2018, the decaying state of the abandoned resorts was captured by several ruins photographers:

- Grossinger's Catskill Resort Hotel; the Grossinger's complex partially was demolished in 2018 and a new owner planned to build a hotel, homes and other amenities. A remaining structure on the property was destroyed by fire in August 2022.
- Kutsher's Hotel and Country Club; a wellness club was built on the site and opened in June 2018. The original Kutcher's nightclub is all that remains of the original hotel. The Kutcher's Hotel front electric sign was donated to the Sullivan County Historical Museum.
- The Pines Hotel closed in 1998. The dilapidated main building and surrounding structures remained in a state of decay until it was destroyed in a fire in June 2023. The Pines Hotel golf course has been converted into a Jewish religious summer camp.
- The former Gilbert's Hotel and Brickman Hotel are now part of the Siddha Yoga SYDA complex. A gift shop remains open at the sites, which are not in current active use.
- Nevele Grand Hotel
- The Vegetarian Hotel
- White Lake Mansion House
- Homowack Lodge
- Lesser Lodge
- Tamarack Lodge
- Concord Resort Hotel. In February 2018, Resorts World Catskills opened on the site of the old hotel.
- Shawanga Lodge

=== Current status ===
By the 2020s, the Hasidic presence in the Catskills had grown into a substantial year-round phenomenon. Families from Brooklyn and other New York City Orthodox communities had increasingly settled permanently in towns such as South Fallsburg, Kiamesha Lake, Monticello, and Woodbourne, drawn by affordable real estate and proximity to established kosher infrastructure including synagogues, schools, and kosher stores and restaurants. The COVID-19 pandemic accelerated this trend, as remote schooling and work-from-home arrangements enabled many summer residents to remain in their bungalows and summer homes beyond the traditional season. During the summer months, Sullivan County's population swells dramatically due to the influx of Hasidic families, who largely stay in private kosher rental homes and bungalow colonies rather than the grand hotels of the Borscht Belt era.

== Comedic legacy ==
A roadside billboard with Jerry Lewis for Brown's Hotel, 1977

Eddie Shaffer at the Granit Hotel in 1977

The tradition of Borscht Belt entertainment started in the early 20th century with the Paradise Garden Theatre constructed in Hunter, New York by Yiddish theater star Boris Thomashefsky. A cradle of American Jewish comedy since the 1920s, the Borscht Belt entertainment circuit has helped launch the careers of many famous comedians and acted as a launchpad for those just starting out.

Many of these performers and writers had a rapid-fire, often self-deprecating style. Typical themes include:

- Bad luck: "I told the doctor I broke my leg in two places. He told me to quit going to those places." (Henny Youngman)
- Puns: "Sire, the peasants are revolting!" "You said it. They stink on ice." (Harvey Korman as Count de Monet and Mel Brooks as King Louis XVI, in History of the World Part I)
- Physical complaints and ailments (often relating to bowels and cramping): "My doctor said I was in terrible shape. I told him, 'I want a second opinion.' He said, 'All right, you're ugly too!'" (Rodney Dangerfield); "I told my doctor, 'This morning when I got up and saw myself in the mirror, I looked awful! What's wrong with me?' He replied, 'I don't know, but your eyesight is perfect!'" (Dangerfield)
- Aggravating relatives and nagging wives: "My wife and I were happy for twenty years. Then we met." (Dangerfield); "Take my wife—please!" (Henny Youngman); "My wife drowned in the pool because she was wearing so much jewelry." (Don Rickles); "My wife ain't too bright. One day our car got stolen. I said to her, 'Did you get a look at the guy?' She said, 'No, but I got the license number.'" (Dangerfield); "This morning the doorbell rang. I said 'Who is it?' She said 'It's the Boston Strangler.' I said 'It's for you dear!'" (Youngman)

== Historical Marker Project ==
The Borscht Belt Historical Marker Project was founded by Marisa Scheinfeld, a noted Borscht Belt historical photographer, author, and Borscht Belt documentarian, in 2022. Scheinfeld had photographed the detritus of the former Borscht Belt hotels, bungalows, and historically important sites. She recognized the complete absence of any historical interpretive roadside markers documenting the sites of the former Borscht Belt.

The Borscht Belt Historical Marker Project initiated a unique program to place 20 vertical interpretive highway markers strategically sited to tell the story of the Borscht Belt and interpret the specific locations. The markers are enhanced with QR pegs for more in-depth explanations. A self-guided audio tour system is being developed.

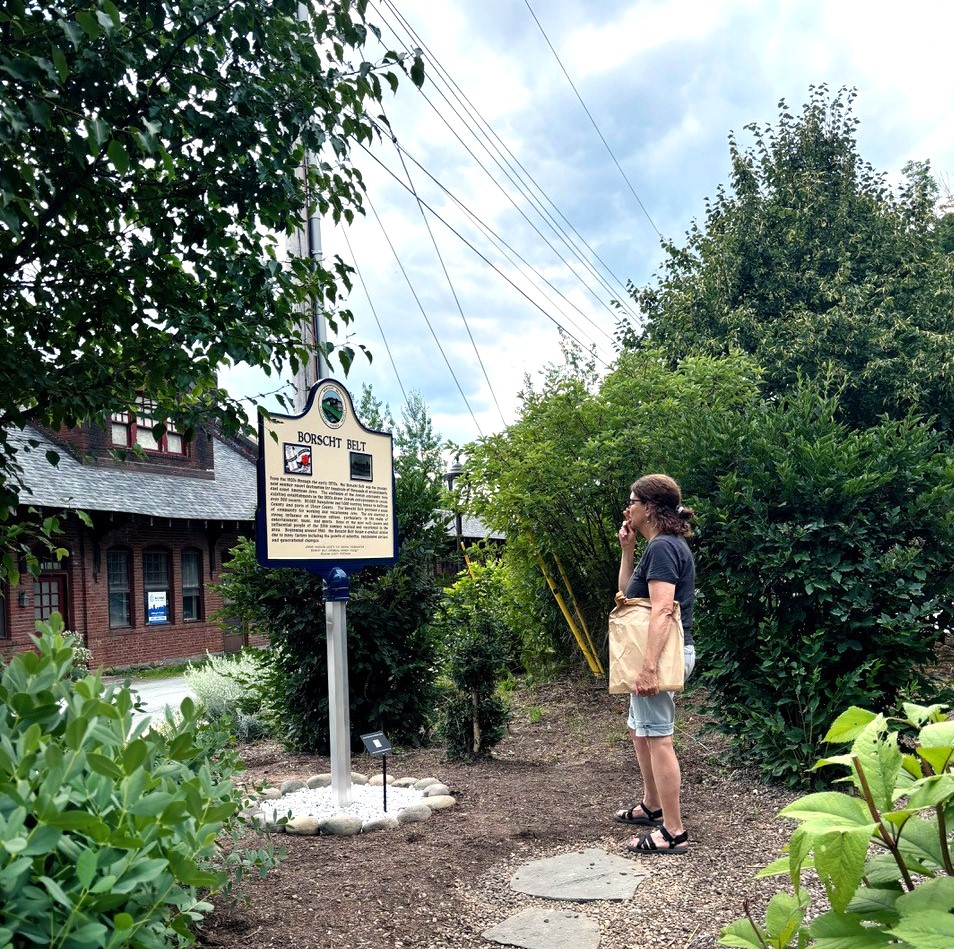
Borscht Belt Historical Marker Project - Hurleyville

The markers are double-sided with representative images. All carry an interpretive text about the specific area on one side and the following common text about the Borscht Belt on the other side: "From the 1920s through the early 1970s, the Borscht Belt was the preeminent summer resort destination for hundreds of thousands of predominantly East Coast American Jews. The exclusion of the Jewish community from existing establishments in the 1920s drove Jewish entrepreneurs to create over 500 resorts, 50,000 bungalows and 1,000 rooming houses in Sullivan County and parts of Ulster County. The Borscht Belt provided a sense of community for working and vacationing Jews. The era exerted a strong influence on American culture, particularly in the realm of entertainment, music, and sports. Some of the most well-known and influential people of the 20th century worked and vacationed in the area. Beginning around 1960, the Borscht Belt began a gradual demise due to many factors including the growth of suburbia, inexpensive airfare, and generational changes."

As of 2024, the Program has completed and sited nine markers in Sullivan County - Monticello, Mountain Dale, Swan Lake, Fallsburg, Kiamisha Lake, South Fallsburg, Hurleyville, Bethel, and Woodridge. Loch Sheldrake, Parksville, Livingston Manor, and Ellenville are being prepared for 2025. Six additional markers are planned for 2026. The Borscht Belt Historical Marker Project is funded by the Jewish American Society for Historic Preservation.

== In popular culture ==
The Heiden Hotel in South Fallsburg was the film location of the 1987 movie Sweet Lorraine starring Maureen Stapleton. It was destroyed by fire in May 2008 while no longer hosting guests.

In 1987, the movie Dirty Dancing replayed the heyday of the Borscht Belt in an upscale resort. The plot was inspired by the screenwriter's experience as a teenager in the summertime community at Grossinger's.

In the 1991 graphic novel Maus: A Survivor's Tale, Art Spiegelman's father Vladek spends the summer in a bungalow settlement in the Catskills and visits with his son at the nearby The Pines resort.

Pamela Gray wrote the 1999 film A Walk on the Moon inspired by her experiences at Borscht Belt bungalow colonies between 1959 and 1971.

In the second season of the series The Marvelous Mrs. Maisel (2017–23), both the Weissman and Maisel families spend a summer vacation at Steiner's Resort in the Catskills, depicted by Scott's Family Resort on Oquaga Lake in Deposit, New York.

Jason Reitman's 2024 historical dramedy film, Saturday Night, depicts the chaos surrounding the 1975 telecast production hassles of Lorne Michaels (Gabriel LaBelle) and the ensemble cast during the series premiere of Saturday Night Live. In one scene, Brad Garrett plays an unidentified Borscht Belt stand-up comedian whose routine is bombing, but whose Borscht-esque humor is being transcribed by writer Alan Zweibel (portrayed by Josh Brener).

Elyssa Friedland's 2021 novel, Last Summer at the Golden Hotel, tells the story of the Goldmans and the Weingolds and their beloved but dilapidated Golden Hotel, once the crown jewel of the Catskills.

== See also ==
- History of the Catskill Mountains
- Chitlin' Circuit – Venues central to Black American culture in the 1930s–'70s
- Sawdust trail – Temporary buildings used for revival meetings
