= The Desert Song (disambiguation) =

The Desert Song is a 1926 operetta.

The Desert Song may also refer to:

== Film and television ==
- The Desert Song (1929 film), based on the operetta
- The Desert Song (1939 film), a German drama film
- The Desert Song (1943 film), based on the operetta
- The Desert Song (1953 film), based on the operetta
- "The Desert Song" (Max Liebman Presents), a 1955 episode of the American TV musical variety series

== Music ==
- "Desert Song", a song by Def Leppard from the 1993 album Retro Active
- "Desert Song", a song by My Chemical Romance from the 2006 album Life on the Murder Scene
- "Desert Song", a song from Hillsong Worship's 2008 live album This Is Our God
- "Desert Song", a song by Stanley Clarke from the 1976 album School Days
- "A Horse with No Name", originally titled "Desert Song", a 1971 song by America
