= Buck Warnick =

American musician

Henry Clay Warnick, Jr., also known as Buck Warnick, Clay Warnick, and H. Clay Warnick, (born, December 14, 1915, Tacoma, Washington — died February 8, 1995, West Orange, New Jersey) was an American composer, arranger, lyricist, conductor, and musical director. He had an active career on Broadway from 1942 through 1963, and was also a prolific composer of jingles for advertisements on radio and television with the Young and Rubicam (Y & R) agency. From 1950 to 1954 he was the music director of the television program Your Show of Shows.

== Life and career ==
Born Henry Clay Warnick, Jr. in Tacoma, Washington, Warnick was given the nickname "Buck" by his father as a baby because he would "buck" in his crib every time he heard music playing. His undergraduate education was from Colgate University where he was a member of Phi Beta Kappa and Delta Epsilon. After graduating in 1935, he pursued graduate studies at the Juilliard School in New York City where he was a pupil of Tibor Serly (composition and conducting). While a student at Juilliard he arranged music for his first Broadway show, the Ziegfeld Follies of 1936. He graduated from Juilliard in 1937.

Warnick worked as a vocal arranger for many musicals on Broadway during the 1940s. These included Banjo Eyes (1941), By Jupiter (1942), Count Me In (1942), Early to Bed (1943), My Dear Public (1943), A Connecticut Yankee (1943), and Jackpot (1944). He also contributed original material to the 1950 musical revue Tickets, Please!. In addition to his work on Broadway, he composed and arranged music for the Ice Capades.

Warnick composed the music for the 1955 musical adaptation of the children's book Heidi which starred Wally Cox and Jeannie Carson and was broadcast on the Max Liebman Spectaculars. He co-composed the score for the 1956 television musical The Adventures of Marco Polo with Mel Pahl, which was broadcast nationally on CBS with stars Doretta Morrow and Alfred Drake. He was musical director of Your Show of Shows from 1950 through 1954. He also served as musical director or arranger for numerous television programs including Caesar's Hour, The United States Steel Hour, and Your Hit Parade.

With Y & R, Warnick produced music for more than 10,000 spots on radio and television. Some of his more famous jingles include "The Dogs Kids Love to Bite" for Armour Hot Dogs. and "Should a gentleman offer a tiparillo to a lady?" for Tiparillo Cigars. The latter song won Warnick a Clio Award in 1974. His best known song is "Number One To The Sun" which he composed for Eastern Airlines. That song was performed and recorded by the New York Philharmonic.
