= Naughty Marietta (Max Liebman Presents) =

- Max Liebman Presents episode
- Episode no.: Season 1 Episode 10
- Directed by: Max Liebman
- Written by: William Friedberg; Neil Simon; Will Glickman
- Based on: Naughty Marietta; 1910 operetta by Rida Johnson Young
- Original air date: January 15, 1955
- Running time: 77 minutes

Guest appearances
- Patrice Munsel; Alfred Drake; John Conte; Gale Sherwood

Episode chronology
| ← Previous "Good Times" | Next → "Variety show" |

"Naughty Marietta" is an American television episode of the 1910 operetta Naughty Marietta. The music for the operetta was composed by Victor Herbert. The book and the lyrics were written by Rida Johnson Young. First telecast live in the United States on January 15, 1955, the conductor for the production was Charles Sanford. The television version, which is slightly different from the operetta, as well as different from the film, was made twenty years after the film version with Jeanette MacDonald and Nelson Eddy. "Naughty Marietta" marked the first musical television appearance by Alfred Drake.

== Plot ==
When American Captain Richard Warrington asks New Orleans Governor, Le Grange, for help in finding the pirate Bras Piqué, who has been robbing American ships, the Governor orders him and his men to leave New Orleans. This is hardly surprising because Governor Le Grange is actually the pirate himself.

Marietta, who is really the Countess d'Altena, has fled from France as a casquette girl, to escape a forced marriage with an aged Duke. When the ship's captain tells the governor her actual identity, Le Grange is determined to marry her, even though he and Marietta have never met. This was to enable Bras Piqué, as the husband of a countess, to get a pardon from the French king for his being a pirate. Le Grange announces his forthcoming marriage to an unwilling and very upset Marietta. Richard Warrington, who has fallen in love with Marietta, tries to save her from a loveless marriage with the governor by saying that he (Warrington) and Marietta were engaged because he saw her first, but Governor Le Grange disputes this, saying that marriage with a casquette girl only applies to French people.

Also wanting to stop the marriage is Yvonne, who loves the governor. Governor Le Grange loves Yvonne but won't listen to anything she says because his expected pardon, if he marries the Countess, is more important to him than marriage with the woman he loves.

At a ball to celebrate the coming marriage between Marietta and the governor, Warrington is able to unmask Governor Le Grange as the pirate Bras Piqué.

Although they love each other, Richard Warrington hesitates to consider marrying Marietta after Le Grange reveals her true status (as a countess) to him. However, Marietta is able to convince Richard to marry her, so all ends happily for Marietta and Richard. And, as Marietta has promised Yvonne that she would help to save Bras Piqué's life, there is a happy ending for Yvonne and Bras Piqué as well.

== Cast members ==
- Marietta (Countess d'Altena) — Patrice Munsel (soprano)
- Captain Richard Warrington — Alfred Drake (baritone)
- Lieutenant Governor Le Grange — John Conte (baritone)
- Yvonne — Gale Sherwood (soprano)
- Louis D'Arc — Donn Driver
- Captain of Ship — Robert Gallagher
- Rudolfo — William LeMassena
- Dancers — Bambi Linn and Rod Alexander (dancer)
- Charles Dagmar and his Punch & Judy

== Songs ==
1. "Tramp! Tramp! Tramp!" — Warrington, Ensemble
2. "We're the Love of Old New Orleans" — Yvonne, Ensemble
3. "Naughty Marietta" — Marietta, Ensemble
4. "It Never Can Be Love" — Warrington, Marietta
5. "Neath the Southern Moon" — Yvonne, Le Grange
6. "I'm Falling In Love With Someone" — Warrington, Marietta
7. "Italian Street Song" — Marietta, Ensemble
8. "Marry a Marionette" — Le Grange, Ensemble
9. "Ah! Sweet Mystery of Life" — Warrington, Marietta

== DVD release ==
The live telecast was released on DVD on November 11, 2003, by VAI (Video Artists International). The format of the DVD is 4:3 Black and White, the aspect ratio: is 1.33.1 and the Region Code is 0 (all regions). The DVD number is ASIN B0000E1WJ4. The DVD Production Coordinator was Robert Scott.

== Sources ==
- The source of the information was the DVD of the operetta.
