= The Desert Song (1929 film) =

1929 film by Roy Del Ruth

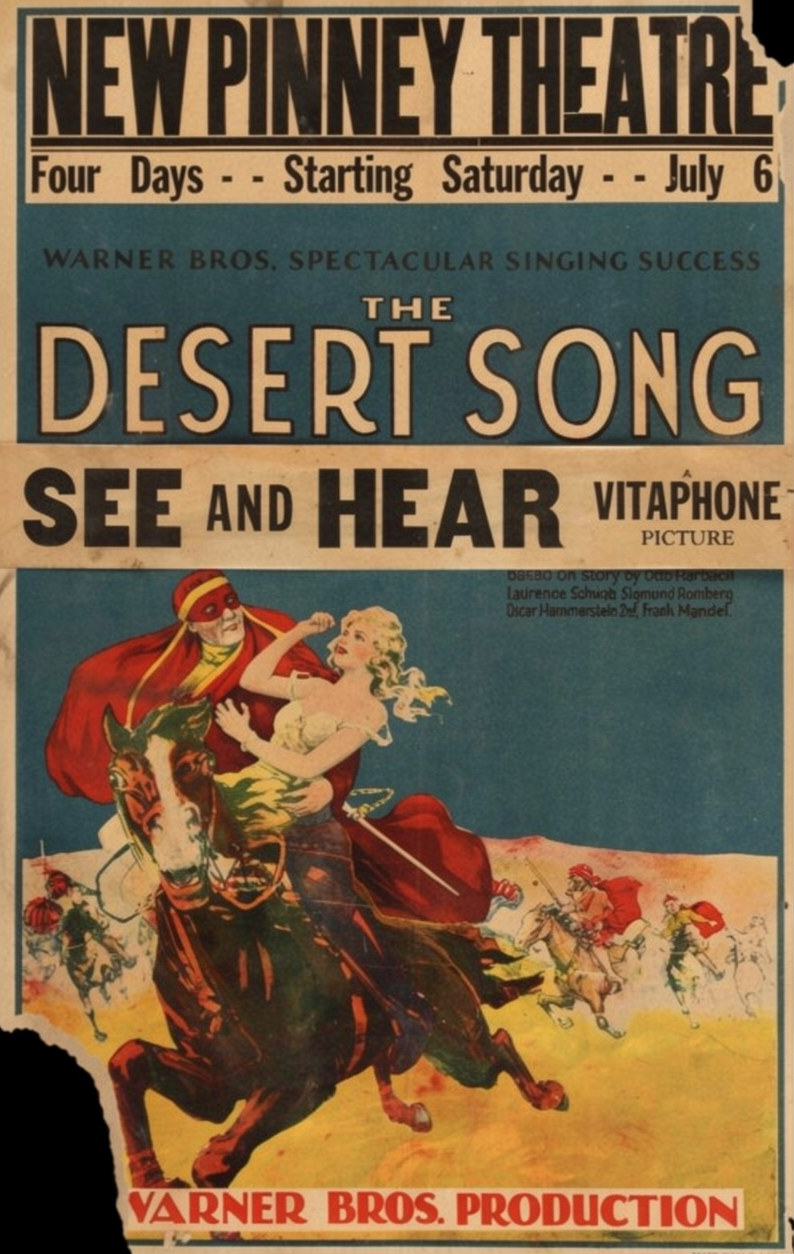
- Theatrical release poster
- Directed by: Roy Del Ruth
- Screenplay by: Harvey Gates
- Story by: Otto A. Harbach; Oscar Hammerstein II; Frank Mandel
- Based on: The Desert Song; 1926 play/book by Oscar Hammerstein II; Otto A. Harbach; Frank Mandel; Laurence Schwab
- Starring: John Boles; Carlotta King; Louise Fazenda; Myrna Loy
- Cinematography: Barney McGill (part-Technicolor)
- Edited by: Ralph Dawson; Furusawa
- Music by: Sigmund Romberg; Lyrics: Oscar Hammerstein II; Otto A. Harbach
- Production company: Warner Bros. Pictures
- Distributed by: Warner Bros. Pictures
- Release date: April 8, 1929 (New York City)
- Running time: 125 minutes
- Country: United States
- Language: English
- Budget: $354,000
- Box office: $3,022,000

The film as it survives now

The Desert Song is a 1929 American pre-Code sound (All-Talking) operetta film directed by Roy Del Ruth and starring John Boles, Carlotta King, Louise Fazenda, and Myrna Loy. It was photographed partly in two-color Technicolor, the first film released by Warner Bros. Pictures to include footage in color. The film included a 10-minute intermission during which music was played. A 30-minute version of the film titled “The Red Shadow” (1930) aired on TCM in November 2026.

It was based on the hit musical play with music by Sigmund Romberg and book and lyrics by Oscar Hammerstein, Otto Harbach, and Frank Mandel, which opened at the Casino Theatre on Broadway on November 30, 1926, and ran for a very successful 471 performances.

Although some of the songs from the show have been omitted, the film is otherwise virtually a duplicate of the stage production and extremely faithful to it.

On the basis of the success of The Desert Song, Warner Bros. quickly cast John Boles in an all-color musical feature called Song of the West, which was completed by June 1929 but had its release delayed until March 1930.

== Plot ==
French General Birabeau has been sent to Morocco to root out and destroy the Riffs, a band of Arab rebels, who threaten the safety of the French outpost in the Moroccan desert. Their dashing, daredevil leader is the mysterious "Red Shadow". Margot Bonvalet, a lovely, sassy French girl, is soon to be married at the fort to Birabeau's right-hand man, Captain Fontaine. Birabeau's son Pierre, in reality the Red Shadow, loves Margot, but pretends to be a milksop to preserve his secret identity. Margot tells Pierre that she secretly yearns to be swept into the arms of some bold, dashing sheik, perhaps even the Red Shadow himself. Pierre, as the Red Shadow, kidnaps Margot and declares his love for her.

To her surprise, Margot's mysterious abductor treats her with every Western consideration. When the Red Shadow comes face to face with General Birabeau, the old man challenges the rebel leader to a duel. Of course Pierre will not kill his own father, so he refuses to fight, losing the respect of the Riffs. Azuri, the sinuous and secretive native dancing girl, might be persuaded to answer some of these riddles if only she can be persuaded by Captain Fontaine. Meanwhile, two other characters, Benny (a reporter) and Susan provide comic relief. Eventually, the Red Shadow's identity is discovered, a deal is struck with the Riffs, and Pierre and Margot live happily ever after.

=== Pre-Code sequences ===
The original 1929 version was a pre-Code production which contained content such as sexual innuendo, lewd suggestive humor, and open discussion of themes such as homosexuality (e.g. Johnny Arthur plays a character who is obviously gay). A cleaned-up remake was released in 1943, with a third version following in 1953.

== Cast ==
- John Boles (tenor) as Pierre Birabeau / the Red Shadow
- Carlotta King (soprano) as Margot Fontaine
- Louise Fazenda as Susan
- Myrna Loy as Azuri, an Arabian dancing girl
- Johnny Arthur as Benny Kidd
- Edward Martindel as General Birabeau
- John Miljan as Captain Fontaine
- Marie Wells as Clementina
- Jack Pratt (bass) as Ali Ben Ali, a Moroccan Pasha, ruler of many Riff tribes
- Otto Hoffman as Hasse
- Roberto E. Guzmán (tenor) as Sid El Kar (the Red Shadow's second in command)
- Del Elliott as Rebel

== Music ==
=== Act I ===
1. Overture
2. The Riff Song - Red Shadow, Riffs
3. Girls, Girls, Girls - Margot, women's chorus
4. French Military Marching Song - Margot, combined men's/women's chorus
5. Then You Will Know - Pierre, Margot
6. Romance (end of song only) - Margot
7. Why Waste Your Time - Red Shadow
8. The Desert Song - Red Shadow, Margot
9. Soft as a Pigeon Lights Upon the Sand - Sid El Kar, chorus (accompanying "Azuri's Dance" with Azuri, dancers)
10. French Military Matching Song (music only)
11. The Riff Song (music only)
12. The Desert Song (reprise) - Red Shadow, Margot, Riffs

=== Act II ===
1. My Little Castagnette (the song accompanying "Spanish Dance") - Clementina, women's chorus, dancers
2. Song of the Brass Key - Clementina
3. The Riff Song (music only)
4. Let Love Go - Ali Ben Ali, Riffs
5. One Flower Grows Alone in Your Garden - Sid El Kar, Riffs
6. One Alone - Red Shadow, Riffs (including Sid El Kar, Ali Ben Ali)
7. My Little Castagnette (reprise) - Margot, women's chorus
8. I Find the Simple Life Entrancing - Margot, Red Shadow
9. The Sabre Song - Margot
10. You Love Me / The Desert Song (reprise) - Red Shadow, Margot
11. One Alone (reprise) - Red Shadow
12. French Military Marching Song (music only)
13. One Alone (reprise) - Margot, Pierre

== Reception ==
According to Warner Bros records the film earned $1,549,000 domestically and $1,473,000 foreign.

Film critic Violet LeVoit observes on TCM.com:

If Warner Brothers had not sat on the completed reels of this two-strip Technicolor musical for five inexplicable months, it would have beat MGM's Broadway Melody (1929) into theaters and enjoyed the distinction of being the first all-talkie (all-singie?) musical. But while the considerably stiff and stodgy Broadway Melody won Best Picture in 1929, modern audiences find more to love in this Moroccan desert operetta... not only because of the Oscar Hammerstein lyrics but the snappy direction of Roy Del Ruth, the shadowy, sensuous cinematography by Barney McGill, and how stars John Boles and Carlotta King can (belt) out the bold music with more power than other wispy singers in the early days of amplified sound.

== Preservation status ==
A complete 35mm nitrate print of the film is held by the BFI archive. A 16mm black and white print also exists from which all circulating collector prints have been made. The film elements from this 16mm source are missing a small portion of one of the musical numbers but the complete soundtrack survives intact on Vitaphone disks.

The 2 1/4 hour pre-code version of the film is available on the Internet Archive.

== See also ==
- List of early color feature films
- List of early sound feature films (1926–1929)
