= William LeMassena =

American actor (1916–1993)

- LeMassena in 1967
- Born: May 23, 1916; Glen Ridge, New Jersey, U.S.
- Died: January 19, 1993 (aged 76); New Suffolk, New York, U.S.
- Other names: Billy LeMassena; William Le Massena
- Education: New York University
- Occupation: Actor
- Years active: 1940–1992

William LeMassena (May 23, 1916 – January 19, 1993) was an American actor. He was best known for his roles in Broadway and off-Broadway productions, the film All That Jazz (1979), and the soap opera As the World Turns (1985–1992).

== Early life and career ==
LeMassena was born in Glen Ridge, New Jersey, on May 23, 1916, the son of Margery L. (1883–1942) and William Henry LeMassena (1874–1944). He graduated from New York University.

LeMassena made his acting debut in the 1940 Broadway production of The Taming of the Shrew, starring Alfred Lunt and Lynn Fontanne. He then became a regular part of the Lunt's unofficial rep company of actors, including Sydney Greenstreet, Thomas Gomez, and Montgomery Clift, with whom he appeared in There Shall Be No Night and Mexican Mural.

In the later part of his career, LeMassena did several seasons of regional work at Meadowbrook Theatre in Rochester, Michigan, and also had a long run in Broadway's Deathtrap. He appeared in Broadway's first all nude play, Grin and Bare It in 1970, which closed in less than three weeks.

He appeared as the Heavenly Friend who serves as a guide to Gordon MacRae on his return trip to Earth in the 1956 film version of Rodgers and Hammerstein's Carousel. LeMassena appeared in other roles, however, including a stint towards the end of his life as Ambrose Bingham, on the daytime soap opera As the World Turns.

He also appeared throughout the 1960s in several television adaptations of stage plays on the Hallmark Hall of Fame, including a 1960 production of Shakespeare's The Tempest, starring Maurice Evans, Lee Remick, Roddy McDowall, and Richard Burton (LeMassena was Antonio), as well as a 1967 production of Bernard Shaw's Saint Joan, starring Geneviève Bujold in her American television debut as Joan of Arc, and featuring LeMassena as Jean d'Estivet.

He also appeared in the first (and so far, the only) television production of the operetta Naughty Marietta, in the role of Rudolfo.

== Personal life and death ==
LeMassena served with the United States Army, 1942–1946.

LeMassena was a close friend of Montgomery Clift, with whom he was in a relationship for three years during the early 1940s. Although Clift publicly dated Phyllis Thaxter, he and LeMassena continued to see each other privately during the run of There Shall Be No Night. The relationship ended when LeMassena left to serve overseas. LeMassena said of his relationship with Clift, "…over the course of three years we bared our souls, and found out everything about each other." "Our affair was for me the most beautiful experience in my life."

He died of lung cancer at his home in New Suffolk, New York, on January 19, 1993, at age 76.

== Filmography ==
=== Film ===
Year	Title	Role	Notes
1956	Carousel	Heavenly Friend	
1956	The Wrong Man	Sang	Uncredited
1964	The World of Henry Orient		
1970	Where's Poppa?	Judge	
1979	All That Jazz	Jonesy Hecht	
1985	Stephen King's Golden Tales	Charles Pennywell	Direct-to-video; Segment: "Do Not Open This Box"
1989	See You in the Morning	Mr. Livingstone	

=== Television ===
Year	Title	Role	Notes
1955	Max Liebman Spectaculars		Episode: "Good Times"
1955	Naughty Marietta	Rudolfo	Television film
1955	Studio One		Episode: "The Voysey Inheritance"
1957	Stanley	Francisco	Episode: "Stanley and Mr. Phillips' Plot"
1957	Stanley	J.B. King	Episode: "Married Friends"
1957	On Borrowed Time	Dr. Evans	Television film
1958	Armstrong Circle Theatre	James M. Hermann	Episode: "The House of Flying Objects"
1960	The Tempest	Antonio	Television film
1962	The Defenders	Mr. Graham	Episode: "The Point Shaver"
1962	Golden Showcase	Poliakoff	Episode: "Tonight in Samarkand"
1962	Naked City	Mr. Hanley	Episode: "The Multiplicity of Herbert Konish"
1962	The Teahouse of the August Moon	Capt. McLean	Television film
1963	Naked City	Dr. Thomanini	Episode: "Howard Running Bear Is a Turtle"
1963	The Patriots	Col. Humphreys	Television film
1963	Route 66	Mr. Spofford	Episode: "Come Home Greta Inger Gruenschaffen"
1964	The Patty Duke Show	Mr. Cameron	Episode: "The Continental"
1965	Inherit the Wind	Radio Man	Television film
1967	Saint Joan	Jean D'Estivet	Television film
1974	Lincoln	Senator Remley	Episode: "Mrs. Lincoln's Husband"
1982	Rascals and Robbers: The Secret Adventures of Tom Sawyer and Huckleberry Finn	Judge Thatcher	Television film
1982	One More Try	Judge	Television film
1988	Tales from the Darkside	Charles Pennywell	Episode: "Do Not Open This Box"
1985–1992	As the World Turns	Ambrose Bingham	Recurring role Final role
