= The Adventures of Marco Polo (television musical) =

The Adventures of Marco Polo is a 90 minute long television musical with music by Clay Warnick, lyrics by Edward Eager, and a book by William Friedberg and Neil Simon. The work was created for the NBC Television's musical anthology series Max Liebman Presents; premiering on that program on April 14, 1956. Produced and directed by Max Liebman, the show was choreographed by James Starbuck. Frederick Fox designed the sets for the production and served as the show's art director, and Paul Du Pont designed the costumes.

The cast of The Adventures of Marco Polo was led by Alfred Drake in the title role and Doretta Morrow as the Beggar Girl with the intent of reuniting the two performers who had recently been tremendously successful with the public performing opposite one another in Kismet. Others in the cast included Paul Ukena as Kubla Khan, Arnold Moss as Nicole, George Mitchell as Mario, and Ross Martin as the Baron. Beatrice Kraft was a featured dancer in the show. A cast album of the musical was released on Columbia Records.
