= The Desert Song (Max Liebman Presents) =

- Max Liebman Presents episode
- Episode no.: Season 1 Episode 15
- Directed by: Max Liebman
- Written by: William Friedberg; Neil Simon; Will Glickman
- Based on: The Desert Song by Sigmund Romberg
- Original air date: May 7, 1955
- Running time: 75 minutes

Guest appearances
- Nelson Eddy; Gale Sherwood; Otto Kruger; John Conte; Earl William; Salvatore Baccaloni; Viola Essen

"The Desert Song" is the fifteenth episode of the American television musical variety series Max Liebman Presents, adapted from the 1926 operetta The Desert Song, which was based on a true event—an uprising of the Riff tribes against French colonial rule in Morocco in 1925.

The music for the operetta was composed by Sigmund Romberg. The book and the lyrics were written by Oscar Hammerstein II, Otto Harbach, Frank Mandel, and Laurence Schwab. Writers for the television adaptation were William Friedberg, Will Glickman and Neil Simon. First telecast live in the United States on May 7, 1955, on NBC. The conductor for the production was Charles Sanford—while the choreographer for all of the dances and musical segments was Rod Alexander. Due to the time constraints for the live telecast, the television version had to be abridged and adapted and it is therefore slightly different from the original operetta. NBC broadcast the live telecast two years after the film version of The Desert Song with Gordon MacRae and Kathryn Grayson was made.

The television version features the only surviving footage of Nelson Eddy in a complete live musical.

== Plot ==
French efforts to turn Morocco into a modern colony are balked by a native Riff rebellion, led by the mysterious Red Shadow. Unknown to all, including his own father, the daring and fearless rebel leader is none other than Pierre, the unassuming son of the French commanding officer, General Birabeau. At the French military outpost, Pierre effectively conceals his Red Shadow identity by assuming a timid and meek persona.

Pierre loves the lively and adventurous Margot. However Margot, who is engaged to Captain Paul Fontaine, wants excitement and romance in her life, and only thinks of the likable, mild-mannered Pierre as a friend. When the wedding date of Margot's and Paul's marriage is suddenly brought forward, Pierre, in his disguise as the Red Shadow, kidnaps Margot and takes her to the desert fortress of his friend, Ali Ben Ali, Caid of the Riff tribe. It is here that the Red Shadow declares his love for Margot, and where Margot falls in love with the Red Shadow, despite not knowing who he really is.

When the Red Shadow refuses to fight a duel with General Birabeau, he loses the respect of his men and is banished to the desert without food, without a horse, and with only a broken sword to defend himself.

Later, when Pierre's secret identity as the Red Shadow is revealed to the surprised General and Margot, all ends happily.

== Cast members ==
- Nelson Eddy (lyric baritone) as Pierre Birabeau / Red Shadow, fearless leader of the Riffs
- Gale Sherwood (soprano) as Margot Bonvalet
- Otto Kruger as General Birabeau
- John Conte (baritone) as Captain Paul Fontaine
- Earl William (tenor) as Hassi (the Red Shadow's second in command)
- Salvatore Baccaloni (bass) as Ali Ben Ali, Caid of the Riff tribe
- Viola Essen as Azuri, an Arabian dancing girl
- Bambi Linn and Rod Alexander as the dancers in "The Desert Song" ballet
- Felisa Conde as a Castagnette Dancer
- Lee Bowman, the announcer who gives information about the operetta, immediately following the opening credits of the telecast

== Songs and Music ==
=== Act I ===
1. Overture
2. Sound Test - Nelson Eddy singing the end of The Desert Song, accompanied by the orchestra
3. Ho! Bold Men of Morocco — Red Shadow, Riffs
4. The Riff Song — Red Shadow, Riffs
5. Why Did We Marry Soldiers? — soldiers' wives
6. French Military Marching Song — soldiers and wives
7. O! Pretty Maid of France / Margot — Paul, Margot, soldiers
8. Romance — Margot, women's ensemble
9. Soft as a Pigeon Lights Upon the Sand — Hassi
10. Then You Will Know — Pierre, Margot
11. Romance (reprise - last part of song, only) — Margot
12. The Desert Song — Red Shadow, Margot

=== Act II ===
1. My Little Castagnette - women's chorus (sung off-stage, accompanying the "Spanish Dance")
2. Let Love Go — Ali Ben Ali
3. One Flower Grows Alone In Your Garden — Hassi
4. One Alone — Red Shadow
5. One Flower Grows Alone in Your Garden (music only)
6. The Sabre Song — Margot
7. Farewell / One Alone (reprise) — Red Shadow (with Riffs at the end)
8. French Military Marching Song (reprise) — Paul, soldiers and wives
9. The Desert Song (reprise) — Pierre, Margot
10. One Alone (reprise) — sung by the entire company during the closing credits

== Dances ==
=== Act 1 ===
- Arabian dance - woman dancer (title of music and name of the dancer unknown)
- French dance - French wives or girlfriends dancing with Moroccan men (title of music unknown)
- Azuri's Arabian Dance - Azuri and her Moroccan dance troupe (of six men and six girls) (music: "Soft as a Pigeon Lights Upon the Sand")
- The Desert Song Ballet - Pas de deux by Rod Alexander & Bambi Linn, as the Red Shadow & Margot (music: "The Desert Song")

=== Act 2 ===
- My Little Castagnette - ("Spanish Dance") - Spanish Castagnette dance troupe (of seven girls). The dance is accompanied by the women's chorus (sung offstage)
- Another Azuri Arabian dance - Azuri and her Moroccan dance troupe (of six men and six girls) (music: "One Flower Grows Alone In Your Garden")

== Broadcast ==
The live operetta was originally telecast on May 7, 1955, on NBC.

== Home media ==
A DVD-version was published by Video Artists International.

A complete CD soundtrack of the telecast, which includes the added feature of an interview with Gale Sherwood (who starred as Margot in the live telecast), was also published by Video Artists International.

The photo, shown on the front covers of both the DVD and CD, was courtesy of Gale Sherwood, according to Video Artists International (the publisher of both the DVD and CD).

== Reception ==
A retrospective review wrote, "The picture is a kinescope (a camera filming a television screen) and the sound is obviously not up to today's standards. But it is such fun and a must for lovers of the old romantic times when Romberg gave the people what they wanted."
