= The Desert Song =

Operetta by Sigmund Romberg

- Original Sheet Music (cropped)
- Music: Sigmund Romberg
- Lyrics: Otto Harbach and Oscar Hammerstein II
- Book: Oscar Hammerstein II, Otto Harbach and Frank Mandel
- Productions: 1926 Broadway; 1987 New York City Opera

The Desert Song is an operetta with music by Sigmund Romberg and book and lyrics by Oscar Hammerstein II, Otto Harbach and Frank Mandel. It was inspired by the 1925 uprising of the Riffs, a group of Berber fighters, against French colonial rule in Morocco. It was also inspired by stories of Lawrence of Arabia aiding native guerrillas. Many tales romanticizing Saharan North Africa were in vogue, including Beau Geste and The Son of the Sheik.

Originally titled "Lady Fair", after successful out-of-town tryouts in Wilmington, Delaware, and Boston, Massachusetts, the original Broadway production opened at the Casino Theatre on November 30, 1926, and ran for 471 performances. The piece enjoyed a London production and was revived on Broadway in 1946 and 1973. In the 1980s, it was played regularly by the Light Opera of Manhattan and revived by the New York City Opera. It is a popular piece for community light opera groups.

The story is a version of plots such as The Scarlet Pimpernel, Zorro and later Superman, where a hero adopts a mild-mannered disguise to keep his true identity a secret. He loves a beautiful and spirited girl, who loves his hero persona but does not know his real personality, which he keeps hidden under the milquetoast facade.

== Productions and film versions ==
The original Broadway production opened at the Casino Theatre on November 30, 1926, and ran for 471 performances. It starred Vivienne Segal as Margot Bonvalet and Edmund Elton as General Birabeau. The leading man was Scottish baritone Robert Halliday. It was directed by Arthur Hurley and choreographed by Bobby Connolly, who was later to choreograph the 1939 film The Wizard of Oz. In the 1927 London production at the Theatre Royal, Drury Lane the leading roles were taken by Harry Welchman and Edith Day, and numerous excerpts were recorded with the London cast supported by the Drury Lane orchestra and chorus under conductor Herman Finck. The show was briefly revived on Broadway in 1946 (at New York City Center) and 1973.

In the 1970s and 1980s, the Light Opera of Manhattan mounted the operetta several times. To celebrate the centennial of Romberg's birth in 1987, New York City Opera staged a lavish production with Richard White and Linda Michele. The Desert Song is still occasionally performed and has been made into a motion picture four times, though the second version was a short subject, rather than a feature-length film. All film versions were made by Warner Brothers.

In 1929, a lavish film with Technicolor sequences starred John Boles as the Red Shadow and Carlotta King as Margot, and featured Myrna Loy as Azuri. This version was scrupulously faithful to, and captured the spirit of, the original Broadway production and became a hit. By the 1940s, the 1929 film could not be shown in the United States because of its Pre-Code content, which included sexual innuendo, suggestive humor and open discussion of themes such as homosexuality. Apparently, the Technicolor sequences have survived only in black-and-white. To capitalize on the success of the original picture, in 1932 Warner Bros. released The Red Shadow, a 19-minute black-and-white short consisting chiefly of musical numbers. This film, which has been restored, was directed by Roy Mack, and starred Alexander Gray and Bernice Claire.

A second feature film was made in 1943. The plot was altered to have the hero fighting the Nazis. Filmed entirely in three-strip Technicolor, it starred Dennis Morgan and Irene Manning. A third color feature version was made in 1953, with most of the adult themes and humor being removed or "sanitized". This version altered the plot to make General Birabeau the father of Margot, rather than the father of the Red Shadow, as in the play. It starred Kathryn Grayson and Gordon MacRae, and featured Allyn McLerie as Azuri. Both the 1943 and the 1953 films changed the hero's name from the Red Shadow to El Khobar. In the 1953 version, El Khobar's disguise was that of a mild-mannered Latin teacher who tutored Margot and had to fend off her amorous advances (which were fairly discreet by modern standards). Also in 1953, all the singing was done by El Khobar, Margot and the male chorus. None of the other characters in the film sing.

Another sanitized version was adapted for live television in 1955 (with Nelson Eddy, Gale Sherwood and Salvatore Baccaloni as Ali Ben Ali). One of the writers brought in to shorten and modernize some risque dialogue was the young Neil Simon.

== Roles ==
- Sid El Kar (tenor)
- Hassi (baritone)
- Mindar
- Benjamin Kidd (comic baritone)
- Captain Paul Fontaine (baritone or tenor)
- Azuri (mezzo-soprano)
- Margot Bonvalet (soprano)
- General Birabeau (baritone)
- Pierre Birabeau/Red Shadow (lyric baritone)
- Susan (soprano or mezzo-soprano)
- Ali Ben Ali (bass)
- Clementina
- Hadji
- Chorus of Riffs, soldiers and inhabitants of the fortress

== Synopsis ==
French General Birabeau has been sent to Morocco to root out and destroy the Riffs, a band of desert rebels, who threaten the safety of the French outpost in the Moroccan desert. Their dashing, daredevil leader is the mysterious "Red Shadow", a Frenchman. The Red Shadow, his Berber lieutenant, Sid El Kar, and their wealthy host, Ali Ben Ali, discuss the relative merits of the Eastern tradition of love for a harem of women (like having a garden full of fragrant flowers), and the Western ideal of loving one woman for life. Margot Bonvalet, a lovely, sassy French girl, is soon to be married at the French fort to Birabeau's right-hand man, Captain Fontaine. Birabeau's son Pierre, in reality the Red Shadow, loves Margot, but pretends to be a milksop to preserve his secret identity. Meanwhile, Benny, a reporter, and Susan, the girl who loves him, provide comic relief.

Margot tells Pierre that she secretly yearns to be swept into the arms of some bold, dashing sheik, perhaps even the Red Shadow himself. Pierre, as the Red Shadow, kidnaps Margot and declares his love for her. To her surprise, Margot's mysterious abductor treats her with every Western consideration. Benny and Susan are captured too. When the Red Shadow comes face to face with General Birabeau, the old man challenges the rebel leader to a duel. Of course Pierre will not kill his own father, so he refuses to fight, losing the respect of the Riffs. Azuri, a sinuous and secretive native dancing girl, who knows the secret of the Red Shadow's true identity, might be persuaded to reveal the information if she could capture the attention of Captain Fontaine. Eventually, the Red Shadow's identity is discovered, a deal is struck with the Riffs, and Pierre and Margot live happily ever after.

== Musical numbers ==
Act I

- High on a Hill – Sid and Riffs
- The Riff Song – Pierre, Sid and Riffs
- Ho, Bold Men of Morocco – Sid and Riffs (not in original Broadway production)
- Margot – Paul and Soldiers
- I'll be a Buoyant Girl – Susan
- Why Did We Marry Soldiers? – Girls
- French Military Marching Song – Margot and Chorus
- Romance – Margot and Girls
- Then You Will Know – Pierre and Margot
- I Want a Kiss – Paul, Margot, Pierre and Chorus
- It – Susan, Bennie and Girls (lyrics by Edward Smith)
- The Desert Song – Pierre and Margot
- Finale – Ensemble (includes Azuri's Dance)

Act II

- My Little Castagnette – Clementina and Girls
- Song of the Brass Key – Clementina and Girls
- One Good Boy Gone Wrong – Benny and Clementina (lyrics by Edward Smith)
- Eastern and Western Love
  - a) Let Love Go – Ali and Riffs
  - b) One Flower in Your Garden – Sid and Riffs
  - c) One Alone – Pierre and Men
- The Sabre Song – Margot
- You Love Me – Pierre and Margot (not in original Broadway production)
- Farewell and reprises – Pierre and Men
- All Hail to the General – Margo, Paul, Birabeau and Girls
- Let's Have a Love Affair – Susan, Bennie and Girls
- Finale – Ensemble

Early versions of the show also included "Dreaming In Paradise", "Ali-Up", and "Love's Dear Yearning". A couple of Romberg's songs like "It" with comic lyrics by Edward Smith referencing Elinor Glyn were interpolated.

Two songs from The Desert Song are among the operetta and Broadway musical songs lampooned in the 1959 musical Little Mary Sunshine. "The Riff Song" and "The Desert Song" are the respective targets of "The Forest Rangers" (it also parodies several other "gallant warriors" songs, such as "Stout-Hearted Men"). "The Desert Song," a hero-sings-to-heroine waltz, is parodied by "You're the Fairest Flower," another hero-sings-to-heroine waltz.

== Recordings ==
1944 studio album cover

No original Broadway cast recording was made, but the 1927 London cast recorded eight selections for EMI. These 78-RPM records have been transferred to CD on the Pearl Label. Decca made an album in 1944 with Kitty Carlisle, Felix Knight and Wilbur Evans, covering 10 selections from the score. This was released on CD, paired with The New Moon. Earl Wrightson starred in Al Goodman's 1948 recording for RCA Victor. This has not been released on CD.

A more complete recording starring Nelson Eddy was made by Columbia Records in 1953. This was the preferred recording of this score on LP until the end of the vinyl era. It was re-released on compact disc. Around the same time, Gordon MacRae and Lucille Norman recorded a 10-inch LP of the score for Capitol [L-351], which was reissued on 12-inch LPs in 1968 [MFP-1184 (UK)] and re-released on CD in 2010 [Hallmark 707902]. This recording is also available on CD paired with Roberta. Kathryn Grayson recorded selections with Tony Martin on a 10-inch record for RCA Victor in 1952. A mostly complete 1958 studio cast album with Giorgio Tozzi and Kathy Barr, conducted by Lehman Engel, was released by RCA Victor and is available on CD. A 1959 British studio cast album stars Edmund Hockeridge and June Bronhill. It has also been reissued on CD. Victor also recorded Mario Lanza in highlights from the score. Released in 1959 shortly after the singer's death, it became one of his best-selling LPs and is available on CD, paired with The Student Prince.

In 1963 as part of a series of stereo recordings of classic operettas, Capitol released a recording of the score with MacRae and Dorothy Kirsten. Most of it can be heard on the 1990 EMI CD Music of Sigmund Romberg, along with selections from The Student Prince and The New Moon. Also in 1963, Reader's Digest included a selection in their album A Treasury of Great Operettas. Artists included Anna Moffo and William Lewis. This stereo recording is also available on CD.
