= Ever in My Heart =

1933 film

- Theatrical release poster
- Directed by: Archie Mayo
- Screenplay by: Bertram Millhauser
- Story by: Beulah Marie Dix; Bertram Millhauser
- Produced by: Hal B. Wallis
- Starring: Barbara Stanwyck; Otto Kruger; Ralph Bellamy
- Cinematography: Arthur L. Todd
- Edited by: Owen Marks
- Music by: Bernhard Kaun
- Distributed by: Warner Bros. Pictures, Inc.
- Release date: October 28, 1933
- Running time: 68 minutes
- Country: United States
- Language: English
- Budget: $243,000

Ever in My Heart is a 1933 American pre-Code drama film directed by Archie Mayo and starring Barbara Stanwyck, Otto Kruger, and Ralph Bellamy. It portrays the tragic consequences of the virulent propaganda that spread false stories of atrocities and stigmatized anything German during the Great War.

== Plot ==
In 1909 in the town of Archedale, Mary Archer, an American girl from the prominent Archer family, meets Hugo Wilbrandt, a German chemist who knows her cousin and childhood sweetheart Jeff. It had been assumed for years that Mary and Jeff would marry someday, but Mary falls in love with Hugo and he with her. They soon marry and start a family.

Hugo enthustically adopts his new country and becomes an American citizen on the eve of World War I. Allied propaganda soon promotes anti-German sentiment, which eventually costs Hugo his professorship at the local university. Hard times fall on the family, and the Wilbrandts' young son Teddy dies. Even worse, the small German Dachshund they got is killed by a local group of boys. Hugo convinces Mary to return to her parents' home, with a promise that he will soon follow.

Hugo later sends Mary a letter stating that although he is now a citizen, he is not being accepted as an American. He also informs her at the end of the letter that he is returning to Europe to fight for his people. Mary is devastated and divorces Hugo.

Mary volunteers her time in a USO-like organization supporting the American war effort. Mary goes to France where she meets two new arrivals, Martha Sewell and Serena Honeywell, who are petrified that they will be taken prisoner and ravaged by the Germans. Martha even brings along a pistol for protection and poison pills to take if she is captured. Mary quickly confiscates them.

The U.S. Army is just about to kick off their Meuse-Argonne Offensive, but there are rumors that nearby there is a German spy who is collecting information. In a canteen, Mary recognizes Hugo dressed in a US Army uniform and urges him to escape because she realizes she still loves him. Hugo leaves just as Jeff arrives looking for the spy. Knowing that Jeff would immediately recognize Hugo, Mary diverts Jeff's attention long enough for Hugo to get away safely.

Upon returning to her room, Mary finds Hugo there and they share a night together. As Hugo prepares to leave, Mary is torn between her love for Hugo and her duty to protect the lives of hundreds of American soldiers. She asks Hugo to delay his departure until dawn and to have a glass of wine with her before he goes. Mary prepares two glasses of wine but secretly drops poison pills in each. They toast their love for each other while troops outside march off to battle.

== Cast ==
- Barbara Stanwyck as Mary Archer Wilbrandt
- Otto Kruger as Hugo Wilbrandt
- Ralph Bellamy as Jeff
- Ruth Donnelly as Lizzie
- Laura Hope Crews as Grandma Caroline Archer
- Frank Albertson as Sam Archer
- Ronnie Cosby as Teddy Wilbrandt
- Clara Blandick as Anna
- Elizabeth Patterson as Clara Tuttle, canteen worker
- Willard Robertson as Kennel Caretaker
- Nella Walker as Martha Sewell
- Harry Beresford as Eli
- Virginia Howell as Serena Honeywell
- Ethel Wales as Miss Honeywell, canteen worker
- Wallis Clark as Enoch Sewell (uncredited)
- Frank Reicher as Dr. Hoffman (uncredited)

== Production ==
Star Barbara Stanwyck did not look back with favor on the five films she made under contract to Warner Bros. Pictures, which were generally referred to as "women's programmers" or "weepers", although it has been noted that "[s]ome of Stanwyck's finest performances come from [those] early pictures."

Beulah Marie Dix, who co-wrote the story Ever in My Heart was based on, and whose career as a screenwriter bridged the silent and sound eras, founded the screenplay department of the Famous Players–Lasky studio with Cecil B. DeMille's brother William DeMille.

== Reception ==
TCM writer Greg Ferrara observed that "Ever in My Heart has fallen into obscurity but deserves a revival of interest. It covers difficult subject matter in a surprisingly straightforward and honest manner and though its story takes place during World War I, it has much to say about some of the very things that affect so many people today, all over the world. It remains relevant and most importantly, remains one of Barbara Stanwyck's best early efforts."

== See also ==
- National Recovery Administration (NRA), the logo displayed at start of film
