= Specter of the Rose =

1946 film by Ben Hecht

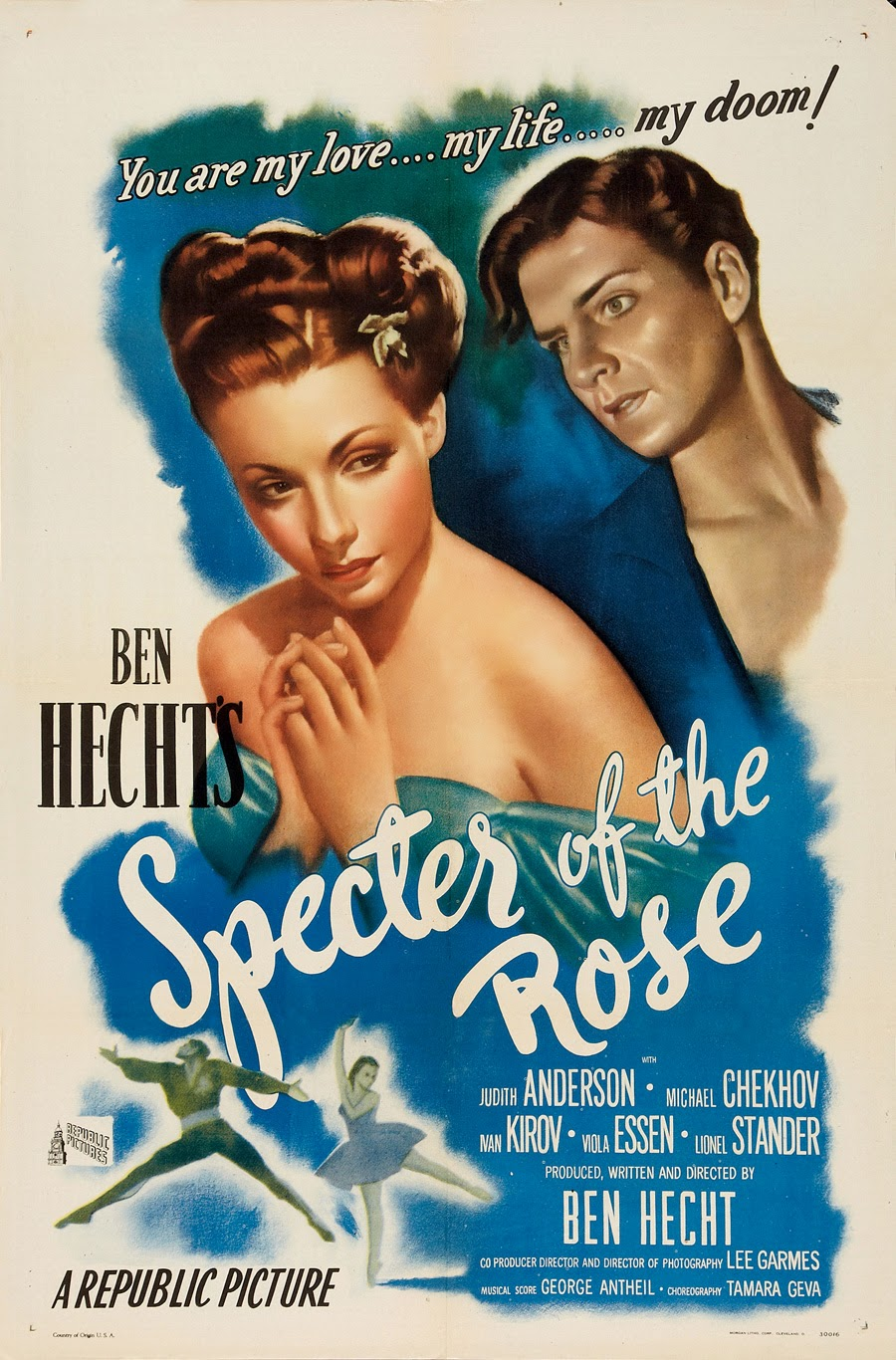
- Theatrical release poster
- Directed by: Ben Hecht
- Screenplay by: Ben Hecht
- Produced by: Ben Hecht
- Starring: Judith Anderson; Michael Chekhov; Ivan Kirov; Viola Essen; Lionel Stander
- Cinematography: Lee Garmes
- Edited by: Harry Keller
- Music by: George Antheil
- Production company: Ben Hecht Productions
- Distributed by: Republic Pictures
- Release date: July 5, 1946 (United States)
- Running time: 90 minutes
- Country: United States
- Language: English

Specter of the Rose is a 1946 American film noir thriller film written and directed by Ben Hecht and starring Judith Anderson, Ivan Kirov, Viola Essen, Michael Chekhov, and Lionel Stander, with choreography by Tamara Geva, and music by George Antheil.

== Plot ==
A male ballet superstar is suspected of murdering his first wife (his former ballet partner) and now possibly threatening his new wife and ballet partner.

Andre Sanine has not performed since his wife's death on stage. He has been haunted by Le Spectre de la Rose, the music being played when she collapsed. But he is willing to attempt a comeback arranged by impresario Max "Poli" Polikoff, who tries to persuade ballet instructor Madame La Sylph that the time has come for Sanine, her former student, to return.

Sanine is to perform with Haidi, the company's new prodigy. As they rehearse, they also fall in love. La Sylph cautions her that she saw Sanine's rage in person before Nina's death. Haidi attempts to keep Sanine by her side for several days, concerned over signs of a relapse in his behavior.

Hearing the music, Sanine picks up a knife and places it at the throat of the sleeping Haidi, the woman he loves. He comes to his senses at the last possible second, then sacrifices himself for her sake.

== Cast ==
- Judith Anderson as Madame La Sylph
- Michael Chekhov as Max Polikoff
- Ivan Kirov as Andre Sanine
- Viola Essen as Haidi
- Lionel Stander as Lionel Gans
- Charles Marshall as Specs McFarlan
- George Shdanoff as Kropotkin
- Billy Gray as Jack Jones
- Juan Panalle as Jibby
- Lew Hearn as Mr. Lyons
- Ferike Boros as Mamochka
- Bert Hanlon as Margolies
- Constantine as Alexis Bloom
- Fred Pollino as Giovanni
- Polly Rose as Olga

== Background ==
Excerpts from the ballet Le Spectre de la Rose, which uses Carl Maria von Weber's piano piece Invitation to the Dance as orchestrated by Hector Berlioz, are featured in the film.

== Adaptation ==
The screenplay was adapted for the radio series Inner Sanctum Mysteries on August 19, 1946. Ben Hecht appeared and the script was adapted by the playwright and Broadway stage actor Robert Sloane.

== Reception ==
When the film was released, Variety magazine gave the film a mixed review. The staff wrote, "Ben Hecht, to say the least, has done the expected by coming up with the unusual. Specter of the Rose was obviously a conscious attempt by Hecht to prove on how small a budget he could produce an acceptable picture. Reports are that it cost in the neighborhood of $160,000. The serious defect production wise is a general lack of polish that is at times disturbing ... Hecht’s direction and dialog give the acting a stylized artificiality that grows on the spectator as the picture progresses. Satire of the characterizations makes many of the film’s people virtually caricatures."
