= The Desert Song (1943 film) =

1943 film

- Theatrical release poster
- Directed by: Robert Florey
- Screenplay by: Robert Buckner
- Based on: The Desert Song; 1926 play by Oscar Hammerstein II; Otto A. Harbach; Frank Mandel
- Produced by: Robert Buckner
- Starring: Dennis Morgan; Irene Manning; Bruce Cabot
- Cinematography: Bert Glennon
- Edited by: Frank Magee
- Music by: Leo F. Forbstein
- Color process: Technicolor
- Distributed by: Warner Bros. Pictures
- Release date: December 17, 1943
- Running time: 90 minutes
- Country: United States
- Language: English
- Budget: $1,148,000
- Box office: $4,595,000

The Desert Song is a 1943 American musical film. It was directed by Robert Florey and starred Dennis Morgan, Irene Manning and Bruce Cabot. It is based on the 1926 operetta with music by Sigmund Romberg. It was nominated for an Academy Award for Best Art Direction (Charles Novi, Jack McConaghy).

This film version of the operetta was, like the 1929 film version, almost never seen after its original release due to content and copyright issues, which made the film hard to find or view. In 2014, it was remastered, restored and released on DVD by Warner Bros. Pictures.

The film is more sophisticated technically than the earlier film due to its large budget and advances in both sound and color. This is the first film version to be made in full three-strip Technicolor. It tries to make the operetta topical in terms of World War II, by having the outlaw hero with a dual identity fight the Nazis as well as leading the Riffs. As in the 1953 version, the hero's name is changed to El Khobar, rather than the Red Shadow.

The 1943 Desert Song is perhaps the only instance in which a stage operetta of the 1920s has been updated to reflect topical concerns of the 1940s. In fact, the United States Office of War Information held up release of the film for over a year because of pre-Code content and the shifting political positions of Vichy France. Nonetheless, it was a success at the box office earning over $4.5 million.

== Plot ==
In 1939, the efforts of Moroccan Caid Yousseff to build a private railroad to Dakar are continually interrupted by attacks by the native Riffs under the leadership of the mysterious El Khobar, who is actually American Paul Hudson, a veteran of the Spanish Civil War. When Johnny Walsh, an American journalist stationed in Morocco, tries to make the attacks public, his efforts are blocked by the French censor. Some time later, a raid led by El Khobar frees the Riffs who have been forced to work in the desert building the railroad, and destroys part of the railroad. El Khobar's men also capture Tarbouch, a native who has helped enslave the Riffs. Later, Paul, who is also a café piano player, informs French singer Margot that the Riffs oppose Yousseff but not France.

The following day, Yousseff meets with Colonel Fontaine, who is his partner in the railroad deal, which is financed by the Nazi government. Yousseff suggests that Fontaine search for El Khobar in the native cafés where his spies are thought to congregate, taking Margot along to hide his real purpose. At café Père Fan Fan, Fontaine and Margot encounter Johnny and Paul. As soldiers approach the café, natives sing out a musical warning and Paul then plays the notes on the piano. By the time the soldiers arrive at the café, all the Arabs have disappeared. Later Paul learns that some captured Riffs are being tortured and plans their rescue. Because Margot is friendly with Fontaine, Paul invites her to the desert, where he plans to question her, and she discovers that he is El Khobar. After spending the day with the Riffs, Margot is converted to the cause and agrees to help Paul, with whom she has fallen in love.

As El Khobar, Paul delivers a message to Yousseff, offering to trade Tarbouch for the captured Riffs. Fontaine, who is with Yousseff, chases the rebel, but when he reaches Père Fan Fan, he finds only Paul, playing the piano. Made suspicious by the dust on Paul's boots, Fontaine questions him closely, but Paul has a ready explanation. Later, Johnny discovers that an ambush is planned and tells Margot, who informs Johnny as to Paul's secret identity and explains that he is meeting with Riff chieftains to draft a peace plan that he will take directly to Paris. Johnny hurries into the desert to warn Paul, but the attack has already started when he arrives, and so he instead gives Paul his horse so that he can escape. Johnny is then captured by the French, who think that he is El Khobar.

That night Fontaine tells Margot that he has captured El Khobar and proposes to her. In rejecting his proposal, Margot accidentally reveals the rebel's real identity. When Paul comes to say goodbye, Fontaine plans to arrest him until he learns that the railroad is being built with German, not French money. Fontaine then joins Paul in capturing Yousseff and promises that the Riffs will be treated fairly. Paul then rejoins his men in hiding where, over the radio, they hear that France has taken over the railroad and all rights have been granted to the Riffs. Reunited with Paul, Margot joins the celebration.

== Cast ==
- Dennis Morgan (tenor) as Paul Hudson / El Khobar
- Irene Manning (soprano) as Margot Bendits
- Bruce Cabot as Col. Fontaine
- Lynne Overman as Johnny Walsh
- Gene Lockhart as Pere FanFan
- Faye Emerson as Hajy
- Victor Francen as Caid Yousseff
- Curt Bois as François
- Jack La Rue as Lt. Bertin
- Marcel Dalio as Tarbouch
- Cee Pee Johnson as Drummer in Moroccan cafe sequence (uncredited)

== Music ==
Paul is a piano player and singer, while Margot is a stage performer.

1. Overture
2. Song (title unknown) - Moroccan men
3. Music - Paul (no words sung)
4. French song and dance - singers/dancers
5. Gay Parisienne - Margot, chorus (music by Serge Walter and lyrics by Jack Scholl)
6. Romance (part of the song only) - Margot
7. * Azuri's Dance - Azuri, dancers (dance is accompanied by drums only)
8. One Alone - Paul, Margot
9. The Desert Song - Paul, Margot
10. Long Live the Night - Paul
11. One Flower Grows Alone in Your Garden (music only)
12. French Military Marching Song - Margot, singers/dancers
13. The Riff Song - Paul, chorus

== Box office ==
The film earned $2,561,000 domestically and $2,034,000 foreign.
