= Otto Kruger =

American actor (1885–1974)

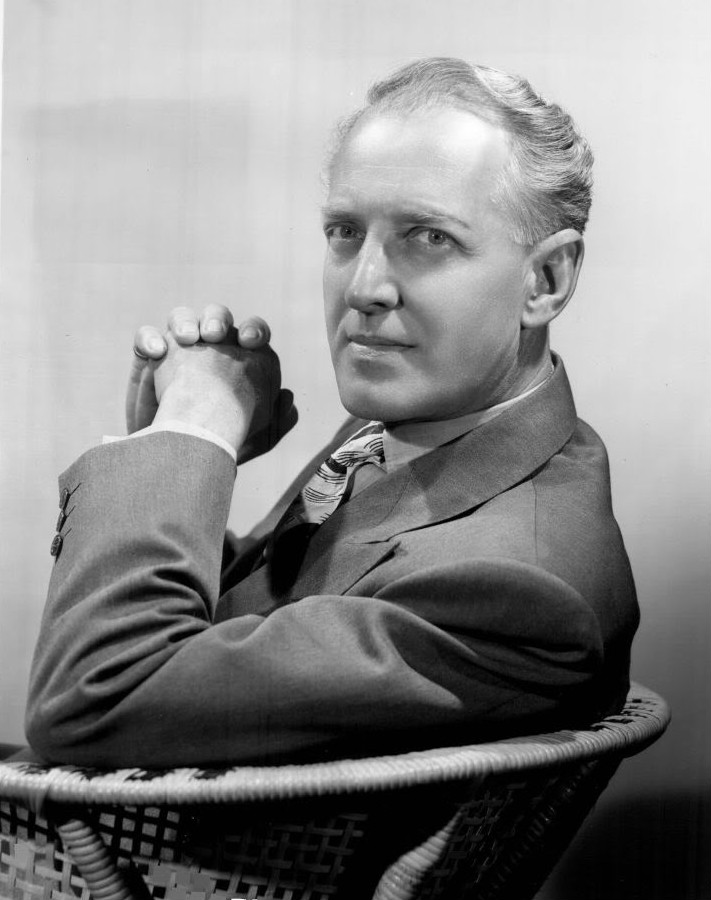
- Kruger in 1955
- Born: September 6, 1885; Toledo, Ohio, U.S.
- Died: September 6, 1974 (aged 89); Woodland Hills, California, U.S.
- Resting place: Forest Lawn Memorial Park Cemetery in Hollywood Hills, California
- Education: University of Michigan; Columbia University
- Years active: 1915–1965
- Spouse: Sue Kruger (née MacManamy) (m. 1919)
- Children: 1
- Relatives: Gayne Rescher (son-in-law); Paul Kruger (great-uncle)

Otto Kruger (September 6, 1885 – September 6, 1974) was an American actor. Originally a Broadway matinée idol, he established a niche as a charming villain in films, such as in Alfred Hitchcock's Saboteur (1942) and Douglas Sirk's Magnificent Obsession (1954). He appeared in more than 120 film, television and stage roles between 1915 and 1965.

== Early life and education ==
Kruger was born in Toledo, Ohio, the son of Bernard Alben Kruger and Elizabeth Winers Kruger. His family was of German and South African descent; he was the grandnephew of South African president Paul Kruger.

Kruger was musically trained, but switched careers and became an actor after studying engineering at the University of Michigan, completing his studies at Columbia University.

== Career ==
Making his Broadway debut in 1915, Kruger quickly became a matinee idol. He played the leading man in Adam and Eva, which ran the entire 1919-1920 season on Broadway. Though he started to get noticed in the early 1920s, it was the 1930s when his career was at its height. His sound film debut came in Turn Back the Clock (1933) and he made an appearance in the film Chained (1934).

Though he played the hero on occasion, for most of his career, he played the main villain or a charming or corrupt businessman. One of his best known roles was in the Douglas Sirk film Magnificent Obsession (1954). Kruger played the supporting role of Judge Percy Mettrick, who unsuccessfully urges Will Kane to leave town in High Noon (1952). Kruger is also remembered for playing the villain Tobin in Alfred Hitchcock's spy film Saboteur (1942) and mob boss Stevens in the film noir 711 Ocean Drive (1950).

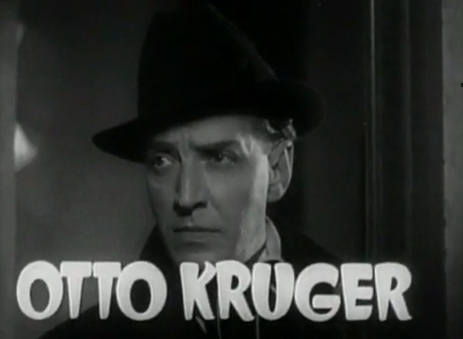
Kruger in Dracula's Daughter (1936)

His television roles included those of Dr. Mumford in the 1959 episode "Experiments in Terror" of the NBC science fiction/adventure series The Man and the Challenge, as Ben Tully in "Gun City" of the ABC western series, The Rebel, as Franklyn Malleson Ghentin in the 1961 episode "A Fool for a Client" of James Whitmore ABC's legal drama, The Law and Mr. Jones, and as Karl in the episode "Quite a Woman" of the short-lived 1961 CBS series The Investigators starring James Franciscus.

Kruger made four guest appearances on CBS's Perry Mason. In his first two appearances, "The Case of the Grumbling Grandfather" (1961) and "The Case of the Counterfeit Crank" (1962), he was cast as Mason's client, and in both episodes was the title character. In his final appearance, he played Judge Norris in "The Case of the Missing Button" (1964).

In 1955, he appeared in the live telecast of The Desert Song as General Birabeau.

== Personal life ==
On September 30, 1919, Kruger married Broadway actress Susan "Sue" MacManamy. The marriage was kept secret until publicly reported on March 20, 1920. Their daughter, Ottilie Kruger (1926–2005), was also an actress and was the first wife of cinematographer Gayne Rescher. Ottilie portrayed Esther in Queen Esther: A Story from the Bible (1947).

In 1960, Kruger suffered a stroke. He continued his career, with some difficulty, for another four years before retiring from acting.

Kruger supported Thomas Dewey in the 1944 United States presidential election.

== Death ==
Kruger died at the Motion Picture and Television Country House in Woodland Hills, California, on his 89th birthday.

== Filmography ==
=== Film ===
Year	Film	Role	Director	Notes
1915	A Mother's Confession	Harold Patterson	Ivan Abramson	
1923	Under the Red Robe	Henri de Cocheforet	Alan Crosland	
1933	Turn Back the Clock	Ted Wright	Edgar Selwyn	
1933	Beauty for Sale	Mr. Sherwood	Richard Boleslawski	
1933	Ever in My Heart	Hugo Wilbrandt	Archie Mayo	
1933	The Prizefighter and the Lady	Willie Ryan	W. S. Van Dyke	
1933	Gallant Lady	Phillip Lawrence	Gregory La Cava	
1933	The Women in His Life	Kent 'Barry' Barringer	George B. Seitz	
1934	The Crime Doctor	Dan Gifford	Charles Kerr	
1934	Men in White	Dr. Levine	Ryszard Bolesławski	
1934	Paris Interlude	Sam	Edwin L. Marin	
1934	Treasure Island	Dr. Livesey	Victor Fleming	
1934	Springtime for Henry	Henry Dewlip	Frank Tuttle	
1934	Chained	Richard I. Field	Clarence Brown	
1935	Vanessa: Her Love Story	Ellis Herries	William K. Howard	
1935	Two Sinners	Henry Vane	Arthur Lubin	
1936	Living Dangerously	Dr. Stanley Norton	Herbert Brenon	
1936	Dracula's Daughter	Jeffrey Garth	Lambert Hillyer	
1937	The Barrier	Stark	Lesley Selander	
1937	Glamorous Night	King Stefan	Brian Desmond Hurst	
1937	They Won't Forget	Gleason	Mervyn LeRoy	
1937	Counsel for Crime	William Mellon	John Brahm	
1938	Housemaster	Charles Donkin	Herbert Brenon	
1938	Star of the Circus	Garvin	Albert de Courville	
1938	I Am the Law	Eugene Ferguson	Alexander Hall	
1938	Exposed	William Reardon	Harold D. Schuster	
1938	Thanks for the Memory	Gil Morrell	George Archainbaud	
1939	Disbarred	Tyler Craden	Robert Florey	
1939	The Gang's All Here	Mike Chadwick	Thornton Freeland	
1939	Black Eyes	Ivan Ivanovich Petroff	Herbert Brenon	
1939	The Zero Hour	Julian Forbes	Sidney Salkow	
1939	Scandal Sheet	Jim Stevenson	Nick Grinde	
1939	A Woman Is the Judge	Steven Graham	Nick Grinde	
1939	Another Thin Man	Van Slack	W. S. Van Dyke	
1940	Dr. Ehrlich's Magic Bullet	Dr. Emil von Behring	William Dieterle	
1940	Seventeen	Sylvanus Baxter	Louis King	
1940	The Man I Married	Heinrich Hoffman	Irving Pichel	
1940	A Dispatch from Reuter's	Dr. Magnus	William Dieterle	
1941	Mercy Island	Dr. Sanderson	William Morgan	
1941	The Men in Her Life	Victor	Gregory Ratoff	
1942	Saboteur	Charles Tobin	Alfred Hitchcock	
1942	Friendly Enemies	Anton Miller	Allan Dwan	
1943	Hitler's Children	Albert Pasavy	Edward Dmytryk	
1943	Power of the Press	Howard Rankin	Lew Landers	
1943	Corregidor	Dr. Jan Stockman	William Nigh	
1943	Night Plane from Chungking	Colonel Henkel	Ralph Murphy	
1943	Stage Door Canteen	Himself	Frank Borzage	
1943	Tarzan's Desert Mystery	Paul Hendrix	Wilhelm Thiele	
1944	Knickerbocker Holiday	Roosevelt	Harry Joe Brown	
1944	Cover Girl	John Coudair	Charles Vidor	
1944	Storm Over Lisbon	Alexis Vanderlyn	George Sherman	
1944	They Live in Fear	Matthew Van Camp	Josef Berne	
1944	Murder, My Sweet	Jules Amthor	Edward Dmytryk	
1945	Escape in the Fog	Paul Devon	Budd Boetticher	
1945	The Great John L.	Richard Martin	Frank Tuttle	
1945	Wonder Man	District Attorney	H. Bruce Humberstone	
1945	The Chicago Kid	John Mitchell	Frank McDonald	
1945	Jungle Captive	Mr. Stendahl	Harold Young	
1945	On Stage Everybody	James Carlton	Jean Yarbrough	
1945	Allotment Wives	Whitey Colton	William Nigh	
1945	The Woman Who Came Back	Rev. Jim Stevens	Walter Colmes	
1946	The Fabulous Suzanne	Hendrick Courtney Sr.	Steve Sekely	
1946	Duel in the Sun	Mr. Langford	King Vidor	
1947	Love and Learn	Andrew Wyngate	Frederick de Cordova	
1948	Smart Woman	D.A. Bradley Wayne	Edward A. Blatt	
1948	Lulu Belle	Harry Randolph	Leslie Fenton	
1948	Romance on the High Seas	Wedding Guest	Michael Curtiz	Uncredited
1950	711 Ocean Drive	Carl Stephans	Joseph M. Newman	
1951	Payment on Demand	Ted Prescott	Curtis Bernhardt	
1951	Valentino	Mark Towers	Lewis Allen	
1952	High Noon	Judge Percy Mettrick	Fred Zinnemann	
1953	Schlagerparade	Remer	Erik Ode	
1954	Magnificent Obsession	Edward Randolph	Douglas Sirk	
1954	Black Widow	Gordon Ling	Nunnally Johnson	
1955	The Last Command	Stephen F. Austin	Frank Lloyd	
1958	The Colossus of New York	Dr. William Spensser	Eugène Lourié	
1959	The Young Philadelphians	John Marshall Wharton	Vincent Sherman	
1960	Cash McCall	Will Atherson	Joseph Pevney	
1962	The Wonderful World of the Brothers Grimm	The King	Henry Levin, George Pal	
1964	Sex and the Single Girl	Dr. Anderson	Richard Quine	
1964	Della	Walter Garrick	Robert Gist	

=== Television ===
- The Nash Airflyte Theater (November 23, 1950) in "Suppressed Desires"
- Lights Out (1951) as Carlton Dane
- The Desert Song (1955) as General Birabeau
- Lux Video Theatre (1955–1956) as Host
- The Rebel (1959) as Ben Tully
- Perry Mason (1961–1964) as Judge Norris/Timothy Balfour Sr./August Dalgran/J. J. Gideon
- The Law and Mr. Jones (1961) as Franklyn Malleson Ghent
- Frontier Circus (1961) as General Frederic Jellich
- The Investigators (1961) as Karl (episode "Quite a Woman")
- Thriller (1962) as Bert Farrington
- Checkmate (1962) as George Emory
- Dr. Kildare (1962) as Louis Conrad
- Bonanza (1963) as Judge Whitaker

== Partial list of appearances on radio ==
Kruger appeared as Mr. Hardecker in "After Dinner Story" (airdate October 26, 1943; story by Cornell Woolrich) from the Suspense radio program series.

== Awards and honors ==
Kruger was honored with two stars on the Hollywood Walk of Fame; one for TV and one for film.
