= Viola Essen =

American dancer

- Born: Violeta Colchagoff; August 11, 1925; Saint Louis, Missouri
- Died: January 16, 1970 (age 44)
- Occupations: Dancer, actress
- Spouse: 5, including Gabriel Dell

Viola Essen (August 11, 1925 – January 16, 1970), was an American ballet dancer. She was a student of Mikhail Mordkin, and an original member of the Ballet Theatre, precursor to the American Ballet Theatre.

== Early life and education ==
Essen was born Violeta Colchagoff in Saint Louis, Missouri and raised in New York City and Los Angeles, the daughter of Asen Hristov Colchagoff (also known as Sam Essen) and Maria "Masha" Vasileva Essen. Her parents were born in Bulgaria; both were naturalized as United States citizens in 1923. Her father was a furrier. She was a child performer, after winning a baby contest. She attended the Birch Wathen School in New York, studied piano with Vladimir Drozdoff, and dance with Mikhail Mordkin.

== Career ==
Essen danced in Mordkin's productions of The Sleeping Beauty (1936), The Goldfish (1937), and Giselle (1937), with Lucia Chase in the lead roles. In 1944, she won praise as the Queen in a production of Swan Lake, when John Martin of The New York Times wrote that she "dances with a fresh and ingratiating young competence, if not with as much style as she will one day acquire." On the New York stage, Essen appeared in Hollywood Pinafore (1945), and Along Fifth Avenue (1949). Al Hirschfeld made a caricature of Essen in the cast of Hollywood Pinafore. She appeared in the ballet-themed thriller film Specter of the Rose (1946) and in the televised adaptation of the operetta The Desert Song (1955).

Essen danced in the first productions of the Ballet Theatre in 1940, and in 1955 reprised her part in Jardin aux lilas with Hugh Laing, at the company's fifteenth anniversary event, held at the Metropolitan Opera House. In 1956, she ran a dance studio in New York City, and Marlon Brando once played bongos for the students. In 1963, Walter Winchell reported that she was looking for work in television commercials, and in 1965 he reported that she had recently experienced an armed burglary and a fire while running a florist shop in New York City.

== Personal life ==
Essen married at least five times, but all the marriages were brief. Her first husband was actor Richard Deane; they divorced in 1944. Her second husband was Polish-born violinist Werner Ludwig Gebauer; they married in 1946 and divorced in 1948. Peter Cadeby was her third husband; they married in 1949. Her fourth husband was Herbert Crane; they married in 1953. Her fifth husband was actor Gabriel Dell; they married in 1956, and had a son, Beau. She declared bankruptcy in 1949. She died in 1970, in her forties.
