= Leif Erickson (actor) =

American actor (1911–1986)

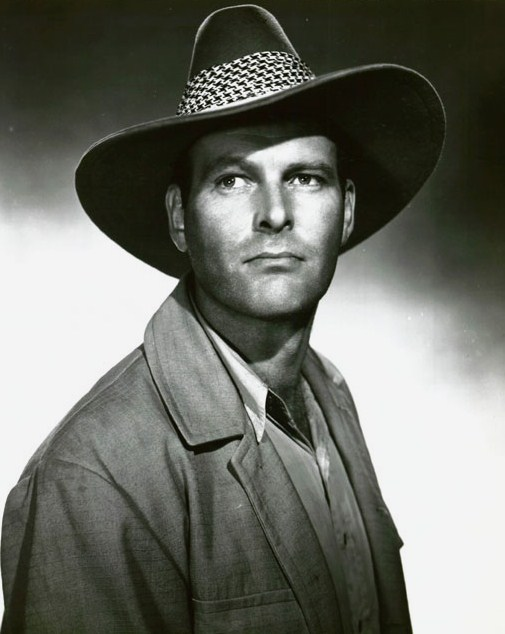
- Erickson in Blonde Savage (1947)
- Born: William Wycliffe Anderson; October 27, 1911; Alameda, California, U.S.
- Died: January 29, 1986 (aged 74); Pensacola, Florida, U.S.
- Occupation: Actor
- Years active: 1933–1984
- Spouses: Frances Farmer (m. 1936; div. 1942) Margaret Hayes (m. 1942; div. 1942) Ann Diamond (m. 1945) (died 2015)
- Children: 2
- Military career
- Allegiance: United States
- Branch: United States Navy
- Service years: 1941–45
- Rank: Chief petty officer
- Awards: Purple Heart; Combat Action Ribbon

Leif Erickson (born William Wycliffe Anderson; October 27, 1911 – January 29, 1986) was an American stage, film, and television actor.

== Early life ==
Erickson was born William Wycliffe Anderson in Alameda, California, an island in the San Francisco Bay near Oakland. He worked as a soloist in a band as vocalist and trombone player, performed in Max Reinhardt's productions, and then gained a small amount of stage experience in a comedy vaudeville act.

== Military service ==
Erickson enlisted in the U.S. Navy during World War II. Rising to the rank of Chief Petty Officer in the Naval Aviation Photographic Unit, he served as a military photographer, shooting film in combat zones, and as an instructor. He was shot down twice in the Pacific, and received two Purple Hearts. Erickson was in the unit that filmed and photographed the Japanese surrender aboard the USS Missouri in Tokyo Bay on September 2, 1945.

== Acting career ==
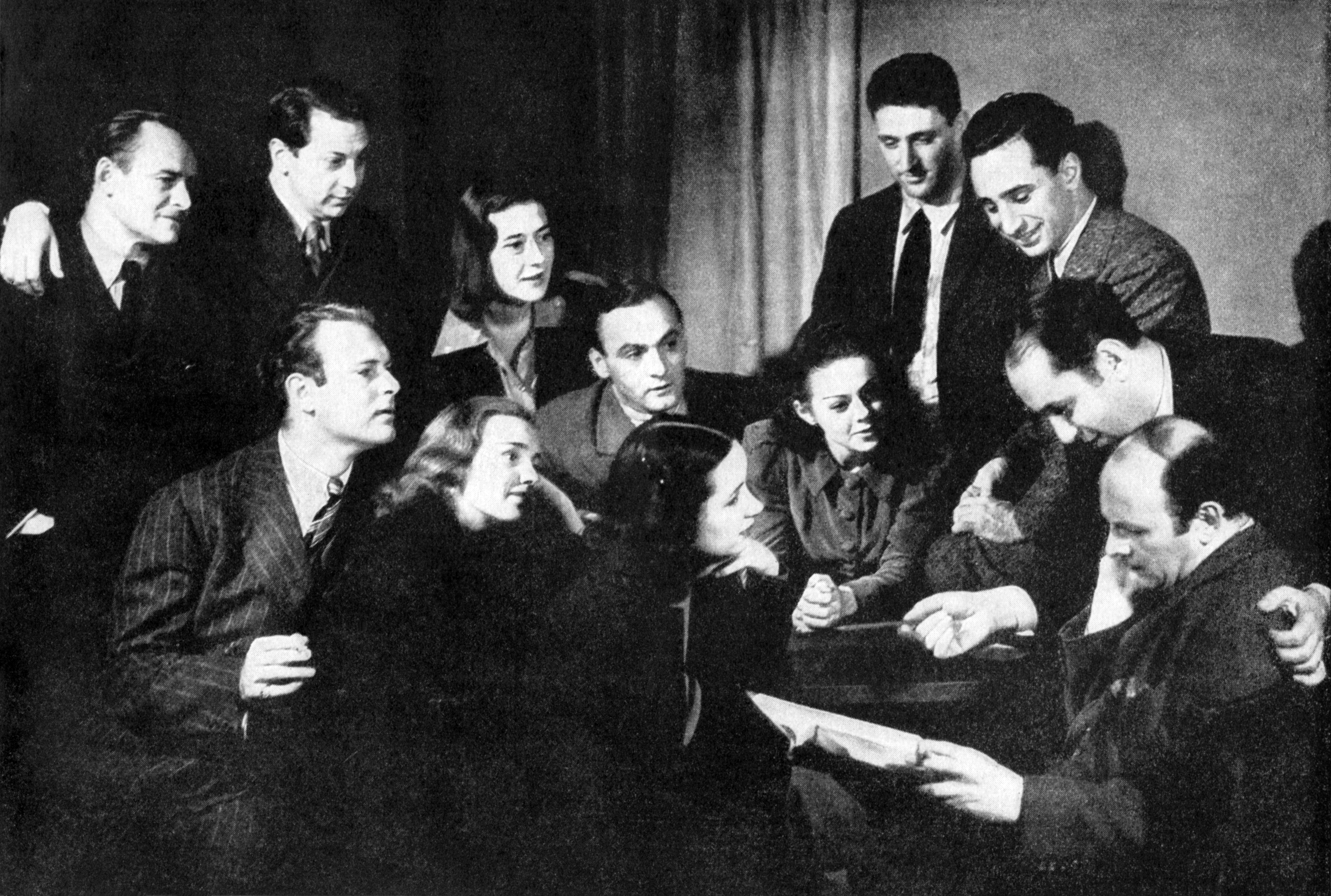
Leif Erickson and Frances Farmer (front row, from left) with members of the Group Theatre in 1938

Erickson's first films were two 1933 band films with Betty Grable before starting a string of Buster Crabbe Western films based on Zane Grey novels. He went on to appear in films such as The Snake Pit; Sorry, Wrong Number; Abbott and Costello Meet Captain Kidd; Invaders from Mars; On the Waterfront; A Gathering of Eagles; Roustabout; The Carpetbaggers; and Mirage.

Among Erickson's more notable roles were as Deborah Kerr's macho husband in the stage and film versions of Tea and Sympathy and as Greta Garbo's brother in Conquest (1937). He also played the role of Pete, the vindictive boat engineer, in the 1951 remake of the famed musical Show Boat. His final appearance in a feature film was in Twilight's Last Gleaming (1977).

Erickson appeared frequently on television; he was cast as Dr. Hillyer in Consider Her Ways (1964) and as Paul White in "The Monkey's Paw—A Retelling" (1965) on CBS's The Alfred Hitchcock Hour. He is probably best known, however, for The High Chaparral, which aired on NBC from 1967 until 1971. He portrayed a rancher, Big John Cannon, determined to establish a cattle empire in the Arizona Territory while keeping peace with the Apache. Erickson guest-starred in several television series, including Colgate Theatre, Rawhide; Bonanza (two episodes, 1961–1965); as Aaron Burr in Daniel Boone (two episodes, 1964–1970); Gunsmoke; Marcus Welby, M.D.; Medical Center; Longstreet; Cannon; The Rifleman; The Rockford Files; The Rookies; Night Gallery; and the 1977 series Hunter. His final role was in an episode of Fantasy Island in 1984.

== Death ==
Erickson died of cancer in Pensacola, Florida, on January 29, 1986, aged 74.

== Selected filmography ==
- The Sweetheart of Sigma Chi (1933) as Band Singer with Ted Fio Rito
- Wanderer of the Wasteland (1935) as Lawrence
- Nevada (1935) as Bill Ide
- Drift Fence (1936) as Curley Prentiss
- Desert Gold (1936) as Glenn Kasedon
- Girl of the Ozarks (1936) as Tom Bolton
- College Holiday (1936) as Dick Winters
- Waikiki Wedding (1937) as Dr. Victor Quimby
- Conquest (1937) as Paul Lachinski
- Thrill of a Lifetime (1937) as Howard 'Howdy' Nelson
- The Big Broadcast of 1938 (1938) as Bob Hayes
- Ride a Crooked Mile (1938) as Johnny Simpkins
- ...One Third of a Nation... (1939) as Peter Cortlant
- Nothing but the Truth (1941) as Tommy Van Dusen
- The Blonde from Singapore (1941) as Terry Prescott
- H. M. Pulham, Esq. (1941) as Rodney 'Bo-Jo' Brown
- The Fleet's In (1942) as Jake
- Are Husbands Necessary? (1942) as Bill Stone
- Eagle Squadron (1942) as Johnny M. Coe
- Pardon My Sarong (1942) as Whaba
- Night Monster (1942) as Laurie
- Arabian Nights (1942) as Kamar
- Blonde Savage (1947) as Steve Blake
- The Gangster (1947) as Beaumont
- Sorry, Wrong Number (1948) as Fred Lord
- The Gay Intruders (1948) as Dr. Harold Matson
- The Snake Pit (1948) as Gordon
- Joan of Arc (1948) as Dunois, Bastard of Orleans
- Miss Tatlock's Millions (1948) as Dr. Mason
- The Lady Gambles (1949) as Tony
- Johnny Stool Pigeon (1949) as Pringle
- Mother Didn't Tell Me (1950) as Dr. Bruce Gordon
- Love That Brute (1950) as Elmdale Military Academy Captain (uncredited)
- Stella (1950) as Fred Anderson Jr.
- The Showdown (1950) as Big Mart
- Three Secrets (1950) as Bill Chase
- Dallas (1950) as U.S. Marshal Martin Weatherby
- Fourteen Hours (1951) Bit Part (uncredited)
- Show Boat (1951) as Pete
- The Tall Target (1951) as Stranger
- Reunion in Reno (1951) as B. Frederick Linaker
- The Cimarron Kid (1952) as Marshal John Sutton
- Sailor Beware (1952) as Commander Lane
- With a Song in My Heart (1952) as General (uncredited)
- Carbine Williams (1952) as Feder
- My Wife's Best Friend (1952) as Nicholas Reed
- Abbott and Costello Meet Captain Kidd (1952) as Morgan
- Never Wave at a WAC (1953) as Sergeant Norbert 'Noisy' Jackson
- Born to the Saddle (1953) as Bob Marshall
- Trouble Along the Way (1953) as Father Provincial aka Ed
- Trial at Tara (1953) as King Laera
- A Perilous Journey (1953) as Richards
- Invaders from Mars (1953) as Mr. George MacLean
- Fort Algiers (1953) as Kalmani
- Captain Scarface (1953) as Sam
- Paris Model (1953) as Edgar Blevins
- On the Waterfront (1954) as Glover, Lead Investigator for Crime Commission
- Star in the Dust (1956) as George Ballard
- The Fastest Gun Alive (1956) as Lou Glover
- Tea and Sympathy (1956) as Bill Reynolds
- Istanbul (1957) as Charlie Boyle
- The Vintage (1957) as Louis Morel
- Kiss Them for Me (1957) as Eddie Turnbill
- Twilight for the Gods (1958) as Harry Hutton
- Once Upon a Horse... (1958) as Granville 'Granny' Dix
- Shoot Out at Big Sag (1962) as Sam Barbee
- A Gathering of Eagles (1963) as General Hewitt
- Strait-Jacket (1964) as Bill Cutler
- The Carpetbaggers (1964) as Jonas Cord Sr.
- Roustabout (1964) as Joe Lean
- Mirage (1965) as Major Crawford Gilcuddy
- I Saw What You Did (1965) as Dave Mannering
- Man and Boy (1971) as Mossman
- Terror in the Sky (1971) as Marty Treleavan
- Abduction (1975) as Prescott
- Winterhawk (1975) as Guthrie
- Twilight's Last Gleaming (1977) as Ralph Whittaker - CIA Director

== Television ==
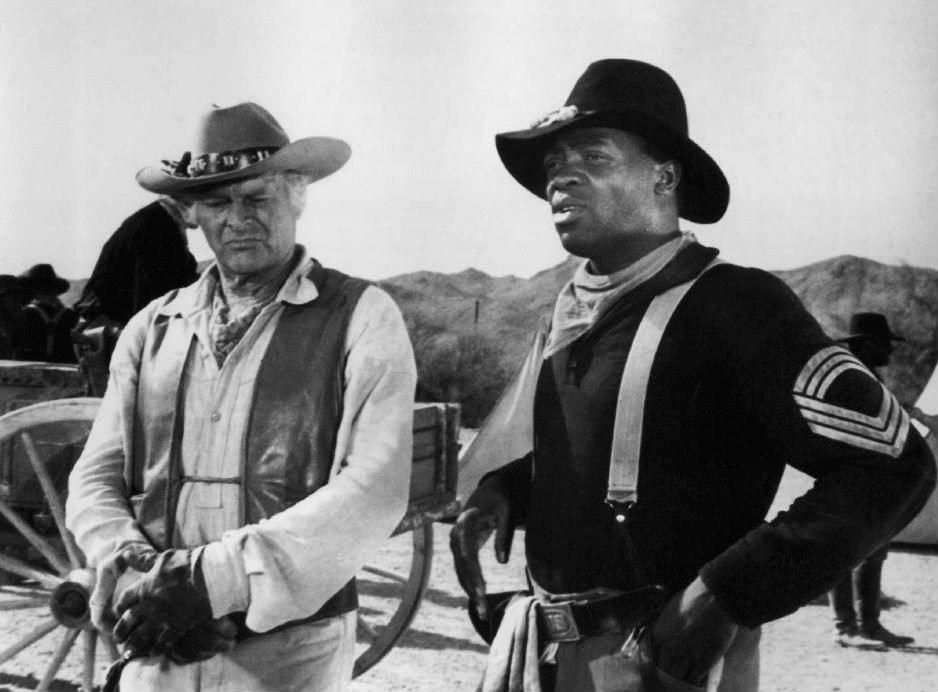
Erickson (left) alongside Yaphet Kotto in The High Chaparral, perhaps his best-known television role

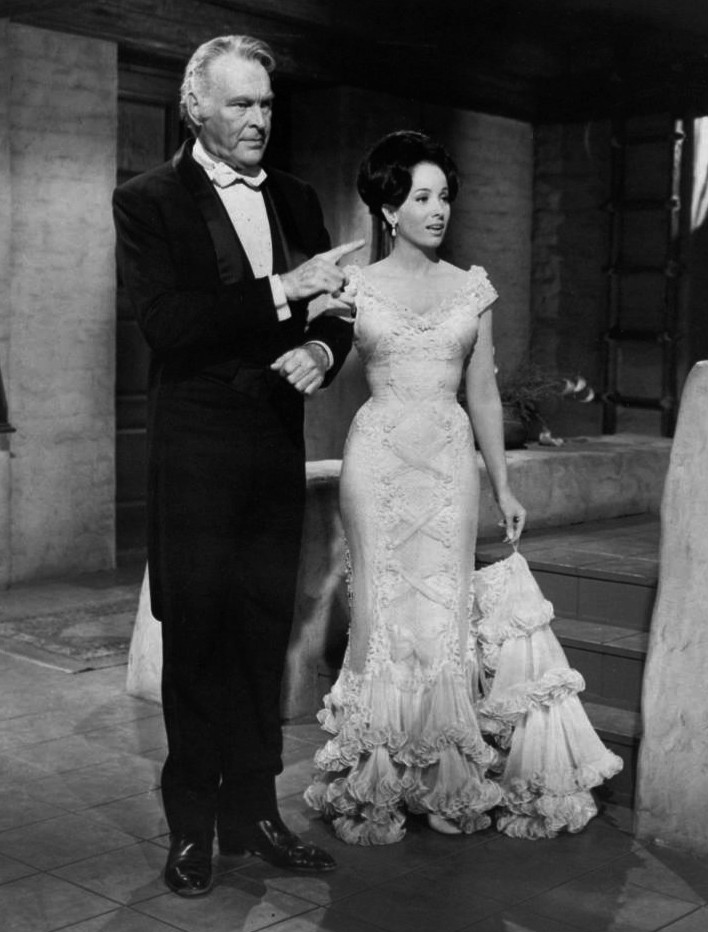
Erickson and Linda Cristal in The High Chaparral

Year	Title	Role	Notes
1958	Zane Grey Theatre	Jim Lewis	S2:E21 "The Sharpshooter" - became series pilot episode for "The Rifleman"
1958	Alfred Hitchcock Presents	Wayne Phillips	Season 3 Episode 19: "The Equalizer"
1959	Rawhide	Jeremiah Walsh	S2:E6, "Incident at the Buffalo Smokehouse"
1961	Rawhide	Frank Travis	S3:E19, "Incident Near Gloomy River"
1963	Hazel	Zachary King	S3:E11, "The Vanishing Hero"
1963	Arrest and Trial	Mort Vallos	Season 1 Episode 7: "Whose Little Girl Are You?"
1964	The Alfred Hitchcock Hour	Dr. John S. Hellyer	Season 3 Episode 11: "Consider Her Ways"
1965	The Alfred Hitchcock Hour	Paul White	Season 3 Episode 26: "The Monkey's Paw - A Retelling"
1965	Daniel Boone	Aaron Burr	S2:E7, "The Aaron Burr Story"
1966	Branded	Roy Beckwith	S2:E22, "Barbed Wire"
1966	Daniel Boone	Bill Sedley	S3:E13, "River Passage"
1967	Gunsmoke	Virgil Powell	S12:E16, "Saturday Night"
1967–1971	The High Chaparral	Big John Cannon	98 episodes
1972	The Mod Squad	Lieutenant Jerry Price	
1973	Night Gallery	Charlie Wheatland	
1973	The Streets of San Francisco	Fr. Henry Driscoll	S2:E3, "For the Love of God"
1973	List of The Six Million Dollar Man episodes	William Henry Cameron	Pilot Movie "The Solid Gold Kidnapping"
