= John Conte (actor) =

American actor, businessman (1915–2006)

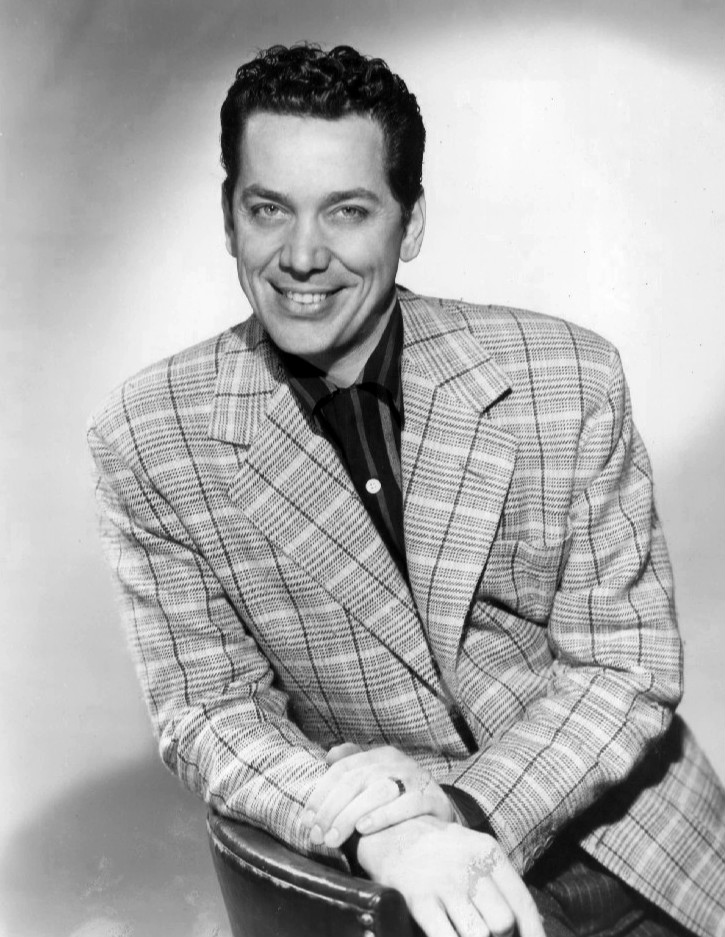
- Conte in 1955 as the host of Matinee Theater
- Born: September 15, 1915; Palmer, Massachusetts, U.S.
- Died: September 4, 2006 (aged 90); Rancho Mirage, California, U.S.
- Occupation: Actor
- Years active: 1932–1972
- Spouses: Marilyn Maxwell (m. 1944; div. 1946) Ruth Harris Conte (m. 1954; div. 1964) Sirpuhe Philibosian (m. 1965)
- Children: 3

John Conte (September 15, 1915 – September 4, 2006) was an American stage, film and TV actor, and television station owner.

== Early years ==
Conte was born in Palmer, Massachusetts. His mother was Italian, and his father was French-Italian. The family moved to Los Angeles, California, when John was 5.

While a student at Lincoln High School in Los Angeles, Conte focused on classes in drama and for three years was the school's representative in Shakespearean competitions. After graduating, he joined the Pasadena Playhouse and "took every role offered to him – juvenile, leading man, character." He later got jobs as a radio actor and singer.

== Radio ==
Conte entered broadcasting with a job at KFAC in Los Angeles. Two years later, he had become a network announcer. One of his first regular roles was on The Grape Nuts Program (1937–1938) with George Burns and Gracie Allen. Conte was host for Screen Test and master of ceremonies for the Maxwell House program that featured Fanny Brice and Frank Morgan. He was the announcer for Silver Theater, It Happened in Hollywood, and The Screen Guild Show.

== Stage ==
In 1947, he appeared in Rodgers and Hammerstein's short-lived Broadway musical Allegro, although his singing voice doesn't appear on the original Broadway cast recording, his understudy, Robert Reeves, made the recording. He returned to Broadway in 1950 to appear in the musical Arms and the Girl (1950) and Carousel (1954).

== Film ==
His major film role was Drunky in The Man with the Golden Arm (1955). He also was seen in The Carpetbaggers and Lost in a Harem.

== Television ==
Conte was host of his own variety program, titled John Conte's Little Show (also known as Van Camp's Little Show), on NBC from 1950 to 1951 and on ABC in 1953. He was master of ceremonies on the 1951 late Sunday afternoon comedy hour Star Time, co-starring Frances Langford and Lew Parker as John and Blanche Bickerson as well as sound-effects master stand-up comedian Reginald Gardner. His own weekly solo skit on Star Time was as a heavily accented Italian-American chef preparing bumbled recipes as he recited them, along with frequent tangential references to "the homemade-a wine" fermenting in his bathtub visible from the kitchen.

Conte was host of The Feminine Touch (1951) on ABC. He had a featured guest appearance with Sid Caesar on Your Show of Shows about a year later. In 1953, Conte was host of Personality Puzzle, a game show on ABC.

Conte made five guest appearances on Perry Mason: In three different episodes, he played the role of the murder victim. In another episode, he was the defendant, and, in still another, the murderer.

In 1955, Conte played major roles in at least two of the Max Liebman Presents television productions. Conte appeared in Naughty Marietta as French Governor Le Grange of New Orleans (actually the French pirate Bras Piqué) - while in The Desert Song, he appeared as Captain Paul Fontaine.

From October 31, 1955, to July 27, 1959, Conte was the host of Matinee Theater, a one-hour color anthology program on the fledgling NBC Television Network. The program aired at 12 noon New York Time live to the entire network from its new color studios in Burbank, California. Color television was new at that time and the network needed a program that would allow technicians to see if their new home television set installations were working properly. Conte served as host of the program throughout its run.

In 1968, he and his long-term third wife, Sirpuhe Philibosian Conte, launched KMIR-TV, an NBC-affiliated UHF station in the Palm Springs–Rancho Mirage market. The Contes built KMIR into the third-largest station in the Coachella Valley, and after 30 years (in 1999), sold the station to Milwaukee-based Journal Communications.

== Other activities ==
He was a founding sponsor of the Eisenhower Medical Center in Rancho Mirage and one of the founders of the McCallum Theatre in Palm Desert, California.

== Recognition ==
On February 8, 1960, Conte was awarded a star on the Hollywood Walk of Fame at 6119 Hollywood Blvd. In 1997, a Golden Palm Star on the Walk of Stars was dedicated to him.

== Death ==
On September 4, 2006, Conte died at Eisenhower Medical Center in Rancho Mirage, California, at age 90. He was survived by his wife, a son, two stepdaughters, six grandchildren, and five great-grandchildren.

== Filmography ==
Year	Title	Role	Notes
1932	The Crowd Roars	Third Announcer	(edited from 'Indianapolis Speedway'), Uncredited
1937	That Navy Spirit	Announcer - Army-Navy Game	Uncredited
1938	Campus Confessions	Announcer	Uncredited
1938	Touchdown, Army	Football Game Commentator	Uncredited
1939	Confessions of a Nazi Spy	Radio Announcer	Voice, Uncredited
1939	Unmarried	Announcer	Uncredited
1939	Indianapolis Speedway	Third Radio Announcer	Uncredited
1939	Each Dawn I Die	Narrator	Uncredited
1939	Our Neighbors – The Carters	Reporter	Uncredited
1943	Thousands Cheer	Dr. Conte in Frank Morgan Skit	
1944	Lost in a Harem	Prince Ramo	
1946	Nobody Lives Forever		uncredited
1955	The Man with the Golden Arm	Drunky	
1962	Trauma	Warren Clyner	
1960	Perry Mason	Charles	Television show - Episode: "The Case of the Madcap Modiste"
1962	When the Girls Take Over	Narrator	voice, uncredited
1964	The Carpetbaggers	Ed Ellis	

== Radio appearances ==
Year	Program	Episode/source
1952	Musical Comedy Theater	Yolanda and the Thief
