= Kathy Barr =

American singer

- Born: Marilyn Sultana Aboulafia; June 4, 1929; The Bronx, New York City, U.S.
- Died: June 21, 2008 (aged 79) Hollywood, Florida
- Genres: Pop, jazz, opera
- Occupation: Vocalist
- Label: RCA Victor
- Spouses: Milton L. Schwartz (m. 1954; ann. 1956) Irwin H. Glickman (m. 1966)

Kathy Barr (born Marilyn Sultana Aboulafia; June 4, 1929 – June 21, 2008) was an American vocalist who performed and recorded popular, jazz, musical theater, and operettas. Her stage name was drawn from the first and married surname of her maternal grandmother, Katie Barr.

== Biography ==
Barr was born on June 4, 1929, in the Bronx, New York, to Ovadia "Ovid" Aboulafia (1900–1978), who, himself, was born in Çeşme, Turkey, and Eabeta "Tessie" Barr (1908–1978), a native New Yorker.

Barr flourished from the 1950s through the mid-1960s in musical theater, nightclubs, television, and radio. She was acclaimed for her coloratura soprano range, three and one-half octaves by at least one account (see Annotations below, "Vocal Range Context"), (Note: Vocal range context: Most people can hit three to four octaves. Mariah Carey has a range of five and one-half octaves, as exhibited in her 1994 hit, "All I Want for Christmas Is You." Prince, some speculate, may have sung notes across six octaves. The "Star Spangled Banner," considered difficult to sing, covers an octave and a half.(Washington Post, December 1, 2022) (Håkansson, Mikkelsen, Jakobsen, Elemans, November 29, 2022)) and her ability to sing pop, jazz, and classical.

Upon marrying for the second time, in 1965, Barr retired from as a recording artist, although she continued to perform club dates (one-nighters) and regional musical theater productions until around 1968. These later roles included Billy Dawn (Judy Holliday's role) in Born Yesterday (November 25, 1967–January 7, 1968) at the Hamlet Street Theater (now named the Rauh Theater) in Pittsburgh; and a hymn singer seeking to save men's souls in Guys and Dolls, starring Tony Martin, at the Meadowbrook Theater Restaurant in Cedar Grove, New Jersey (May 29, 1968–June 30, 1968).

== Personal life ==
Her first marriage was to Milton ("Milt" or "Milty") Leon Schwartz (1901–1992), on June 20, 1954, in The Bronx. Schwartz, who was 27 years older, had been a saxophonist with the Al Trace Orchestra; he was co-owner with Ralph Mitchell (né Ralph Michelev; 1916–2004) of the acclaimed Chicago jazz club the Preview Lounge, at 7 West Randolph Street, that ran from about 1945 until the summer of 1960. At the same address, Schwartz and Mitchell also owned the Modern Jazz Room (formerly the Encore Room and formerly Mambo City), upstairs.

Her and Schwartz' marriage was annulled in New York Supreme Court on May 28, 1956, refereed by Ed Koch (who years later become Mayor of New York City).

In 1958, news media reported that Aboulafia was officially changing her name to Kathy Barr.

In 1965, in Manhattan, under her birth name, "Marilyn Aboulafia," she married Irwin M. Glickman (1930–2011). In 1966, she and Glickman had a daughter — Sylvia Beth Glickman. In 1968, reflecting on her disappointment about her first marriage, Barr confided that she was happy in her second marriage and declared, "This time, I wanted to work at it."

Barr died in Hollywood, Florida, on June 21, 2008.

Her daughter Sylvia married Jeffrey Zina Johnston in 2005. Sylvia and Jeff had two sons, both born in Hollywood, Florida: John Michael Thunder Johnston, born in 2005, and Lightning James Marshall Hawk Johnston, born in 2008.

== Discography ==
=== Albums ===
Label	Cat No.	Released	Album Artist(s)	Side A	Side B	Notes
RCA Victor	LPM–1562	November; 1957	Follow Me –––––––––– Kathy Barr; Jerry Fielding (arranger & conductor)	1. "Tiptoe Through the Tulips" (audio); 2. "My Heart Belongs to Daddy" (audio); 3. "Cuddle up a Little Closer" (audio); 4. "How Long Has This Been Going On?" (audio); 5. "I'm Just Wild About Harry" (audio); 6. "Give Me Something to Remember You By" (audio) –––––––––– Mx runout H2 PP5757 – 1S I A1	1. "Bye Bye Blackbird" (audio); 2. "Love Is Here to Stay" (audio); 3. "Day In, Day Out" (audio); 4. "Fine and Dandy" (audio); 5. "I Know He's Mine" (audio); 6. "Follow Me" (audio) –––––––––– Mx runout H2 PP-5758 – 1S I B1	George T. Simon (sleeve notes); Sid Kuller (sleeve notes); Peter Gowland (cover photo) –––––––––– OCLC 12875997 (all editions)
RCA Victor; RCA	LSO–1000; LOP–1000; SF–5005; EPA–4168; CPS–141	1958	Selections From; The Desert Song –––––––––– Giorgio Tozzi as The Red Shadow; Kathy Barr as Margo; Peter Palmer (1931–2021) (supporting role); Eugene Morgan (né Eugene Byron Morgan; 1909–1974) (supporting role); Warren Galjour (né Warren Joseph Galjour; 1917–2009) (supporting role); With Male Chorus and Orchestra; A. Lehman Engel (1910–1982) (conductor)	1. "Prelude and Opening Chorus" (audio); 2. "The Riff Song" (audio); 3. "O' Pretty Maid of France" (audio); 4. "Why Did We Marry Soldiers?" (audio); 5. "French Military Marching Song" (audio); 6. "Romance" (audio); 7. "Then You Will Know" (audio); 8. "I Want a Kiss" (audio); 9. "The Desert Song" (audio) –––––––––– Mx label H2PP–7449	1. "Finale" – Act I (audio); 2. "Opening Chorus" ("My Little Castagnette") – Act II (audio); 3. "Eastern and Western Love" (audio); 4. "The Sabre Song" (audio); 5. "Finale" – Act II (audio) –––––––––– Mx label H2PP–7450	Leonard Louis Levinson (1904–1974) (sleeve notes) "Beautiful young Kathy Barr is the Margot of our production." Victor Kalin (né Victor Benson Kalin; 1919–1991) (illustration) –––––––––– OCLC 5857234 (all editions)
Äva Records	A–48	1964	Do It Again –––––––––– Kathy Barr; Jerry Fielding (arranger & conductor)	1. "Just Squeeze Me" (audio); 2. "Should I" (audio); 3. "Do It Again" (audio); 4. "My Sugar Is So Refined" (audio); 5. "How Come You Do Me Like You Do" (audio) –––––––––– Mx label HPS–285	1. "How Little We Know" (audio); 2. "It All Depends on You" (audio); 3. "All of You" (audio); 4. "You're Driving Me Crazy" (audio); 5. "Don'cha Go 'Way Mad" (audio) –––––––––– Mx label HPS–286	Peter Whorf Graphics (Note: Peter Whorf (né Peter Lee Whorf; 1931–1995) Richard Whorf was one of three sons of the actor Richard Whorf.) (né Peter Lee Whorf; 1931–1995) (design); Wally Heider (1922–1989) (engineer); Leslie Carr (liner notes) (illustration); Linda Bartlett (photography); Recorded at United Recording Corp. Hollywood, California –––––––––– OCLC 796372591 (all editions)

=== Singles ===
Label	Cat No.	Released	Artist(s)	Side A	Side B	Notes
RCA Victor; RCA	20–7036; 45–7036; 10373	1957	Kathy Barr; With Orchestra; Directed by Jerry Fielding	"Welcome Mat" (audio) (©1957); By Jerry Fielding –––––––––– Mx label H2PW–5447	"A Slip of the Lip" (©1957); By Walter Kent & Tom Walton (words & music) –––––––––– Mx label H2PW–5446	George T. Simon (sleeve notes); Sid Kuller (sleeve notes) –––––––––– OCLC 1116161307 (all editions)
RCA	EPA–4168	1958	Selections From; The Desert Song –––––––––– Giorgio Tozzi as The Red Shadow; Kathy Barr as Margo; Peter Palmer (1931–2021) (supporting role); Eugene Morgan (né Eugene Byron Morgan; 1909–1974) (supporting role); Warren Galjour (né Warren Joseph Galjour; 1917–2009) (supporting role); With Male Chorus and Orchestra; A. Lehman Engel (1910–1982) (conductor)	1. "The Riff Song" (audio); 2. "The Desert Song" (audio) –––––––––– Mx label H 2 PH–7856	1. "Romance" (audio); 2. "One Alone" –––––––––– Mx label H 2 PH–7857	Leonard Louis Levinson (1904–1974) (sleeve notes) "Beautiful young Kathy Barr is the Margot of our production." Victor Kalin (né Victor Benson Kalin; 1919–1991) (illustration) –––––––––– OCLC 5857234 (all editions)

‡ Audio courtesy of YouTube

== Radio transcription disc ==
- "Kathy Barr." Magic in Music. Radio transcription disc. Program 42. Series: END-570. Prog. Time 25:00. Armed Forces Radio & Television Service (AFRTS). → via Rand's Esoteric OTR, a blog of Randy Riddle (profile at Duke University) at randsesotericotr.podbean.com.
  Note: The program, hosted by Lt. Bob Osterberg, USMC (né Robert Pierce Osterberg; 1929–2016), interviewed Kathy Barr and featured tracks from her new album, Follow Me. The show title, Magic in Music, is titled Magic of Music on the AFRTS disk label.

== Musical theater roles ==
- Marinka, as Marinka (leading soprano role)

Winter Garden Theatre, New York
Australia touring production
Tivoli circuit, Melbourne: Opened May 28, 1948, at the Tivoli Theater, Melbourne
At the age of 19, Barr was elevated to the role of Marinka after being the understudy for Kathryn Grayson

- Wizard of Oz, as Dorothy Gale (leading soprano role)

Pittsburgh Civic Light Opera, August 1 thru August 6, 1949
