= Rocky (1948 film) =

1948 film

- Directed by: Phil Karlson
- Written by: Jack De Witt
- Story by: Milton Raison
- Produced by: Lindsley Parsons
- Starring: Roddy McDowall; Edgar Barrier; Gale Sherwood
- Cinematography: William A. Sickner
- Edited by: Robert Warwick
- Music by: Edward J. Kay
- Production company: Monogram Pictures
- Distributed by: Monogram Pictures
- Release date: January 17, 1948
- Running time: 76 minutes
- Country: United States
- Language: English

Rocky is a 1948 American drama film directed by Phil Karlson and starring Roddy McDowall, Edgar Barrier and Gale Sherwood. It was produced and distributed by Monogram Pictures.

== Plot ==
A painter, John Hammond, has a dog named Rocky which is suspected for an epidemic of sheep killings.

== Cast ==
- Roddy McDowall as Chris Hammond
- Edgar Barrier as John Hammond
- Nita Hunter as Kathy Forrester
- Gale Sherwood as Ellen Forrester
- Jonathan Hale as Kenneth Forrester
- William Ruhl as Drew
- Claire Whitney as Hortense
- Irving Bacon as Bert Hillman
- John Alvin as Jack Arnold
- Ben Corbett as Hanson

== Production ==
The film was first in a series of movies McDowall agreed to make with Monogram. Filming started 10 June 1947 near Cedar City, Utah. McDowall was also associate producer. He was meant to follow it with an adaptation of Mysterious Island by Jules Verne but that was never made.

Nina Hunter was borrowed from Comet Productions to appear in the film.
