= Charles Novi =

American art director (1887–1966)

- Born: June 30, 1887; Milan, Italy
- Died: April 1966 (aged 78); Mexico City, Mexico
- Occupation: Art director
- Years active: 1936-1944

Charles Novi (June 30, 1887 – April 1966) was an American art director. He was nominated an Academy Award in the category Best Art Direction for the film The Desert Song.

== Selected filmography ==
- Law of the Tropics (1941)
- The Desert Song (1943)
