= Blonde Savage =

1947 film directed by Steve Sekely

- Directed by: Steve Sekely
- Screenplay by: Gordon Bache
- Produced by: Lionel J. Toll
- Starring: Leif Erickson; Gale Sherwood; Veda Ann Borg; Douglass Dumbrille; Frank Jenks; Matt Willis
- Cinematography: William A. Sickner
- Edited by: Paul Landres
- Music by: Leo Erdody
- Production company: Ensign Productions of California
- Distributed by: Producers Releasing Corporation
- Release date: November 22, 1947
- Running time: 62 minutes
- Country: United States
- Language: English

Blonde Savage is a 1947 American adventure film directed by Steve Sekely and written by Gordon Bache. The film stars Leif Erickson, Gale Sherwood, Veda Ann Borg, Douglass Dumbrille, Frank Jenks, and Matt Willis. It was released on November 22, 1947 by Producers Releasing Corporation.

== Plot ==
Bush pilots Steve Blake and Hoppy Owens are hired to locate a village in the deep jungle by Mark Harper, head of a mining company. Thing are complicated Harper's attractive wife Connie who once had an affair with Steve and will do anything to have Steve fly her away.

Their first day of exploration uncovers a native tribe led by a tall white blonde woman who was raised by the tribe after her parents were mysteriously killed years earlier.

== Cast ==
- Leif Erickson as Steve Blake
- Gale Sherwood as Meelah
- Veda Ann Borg as Connie Harper
- Douglass Dumbrille as Mark Harper
- Frank Jenks as Hoppy Owens
- Matt Willis as Berger
- Ernest Whitman as Tonga
- Cay Forrester as Mary Comstock
- John Dehner as Joe Comstock
- Art Foster as Stone
- Alex Frazer as George Bennett
- Eve Whitney as Clarissa
- James Logan as Inspector

== Gallery ==
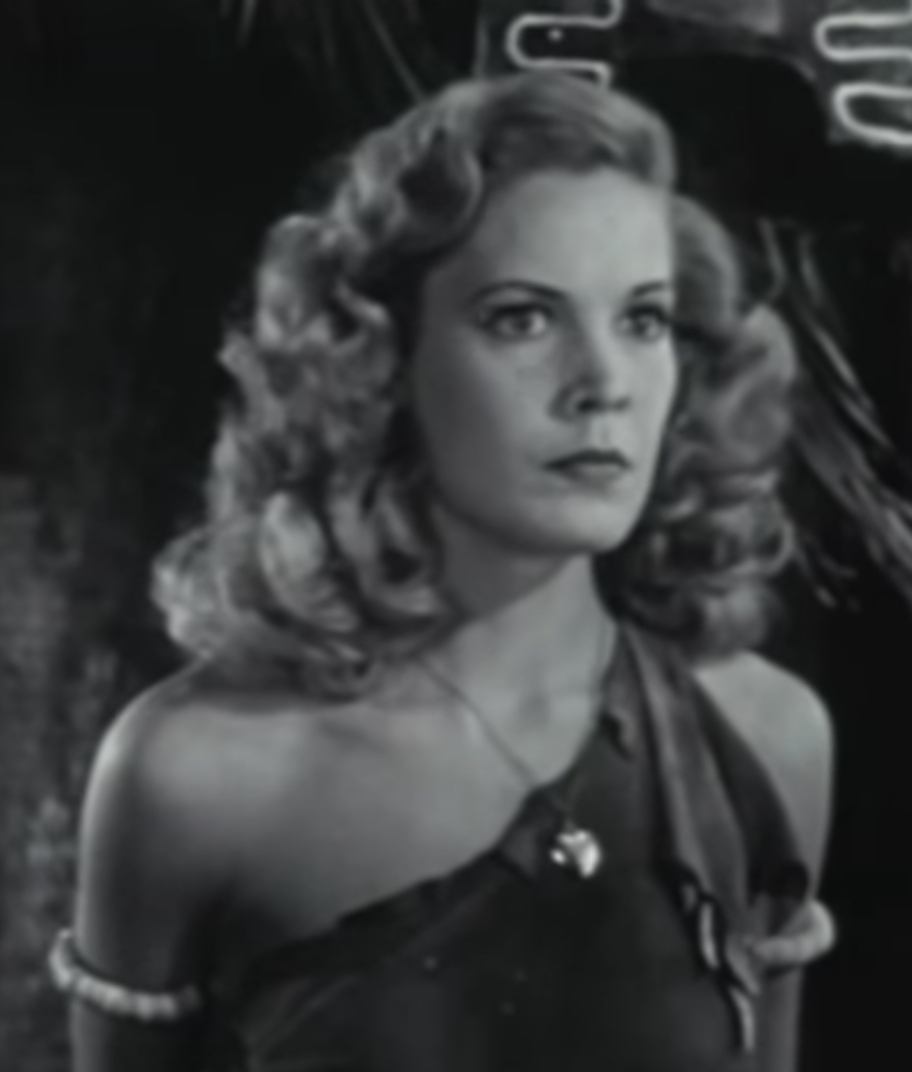
Gale Sherwood

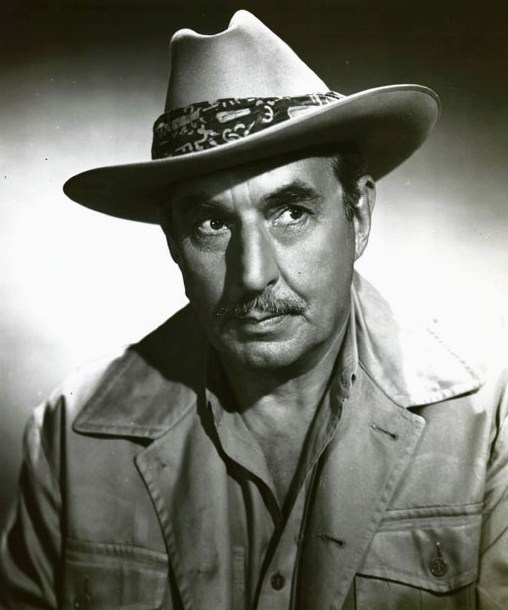
Douglass Dumbrille

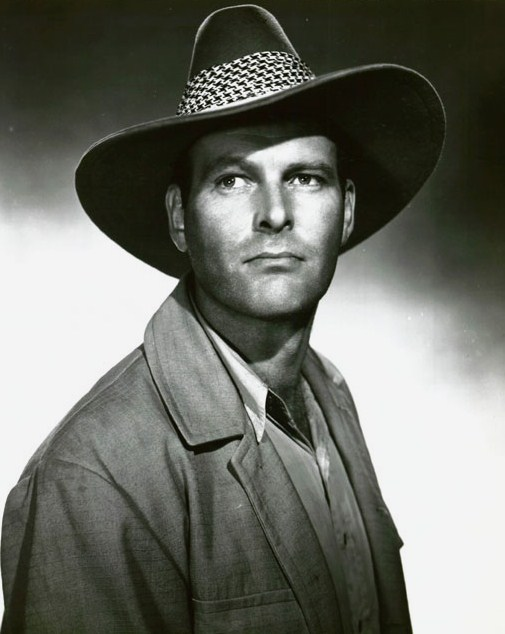
Leif Erickson

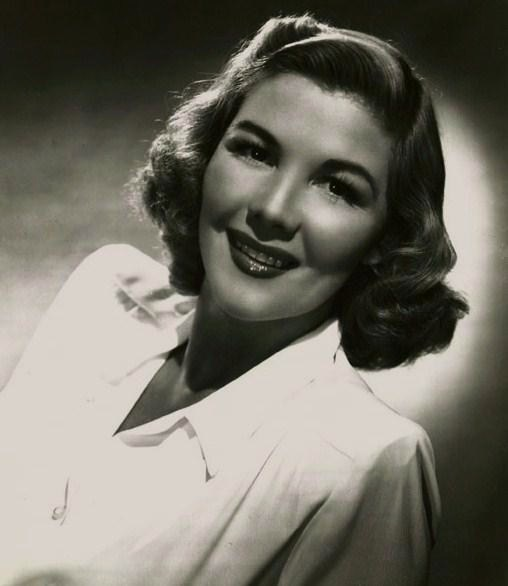
Veda Ann Borg
