= Turn Back the Clock (film) =

1933 film by Edgar Selwyn

- Directed by: Edgar Selwyn
- Written by: Edgar Selwyn; Ben Hecht
- Produced by: Harry Rapf
- Starring: Lee Tracy; Mae Clarke
- Cinematography: Harold Rosson
- Edited by: Frank Sullivan
- Music by: Herbert Stothart
- Distributed by: Metro-Goldwyn-Mayer
- Release date: August 25, 1933 (U.S.)
- Running time: 78 minutes
- Country: United States
- Language: English

Turn Back the Clock is a 1933 American pre-Code MGM fantasy comedy-drama film directed by Edgar Selwyn, written by Selwyn and Ben Hecht, and starring Mae Clarke and Lee Tracy (while under contract to Metro-Goldwyn-Mayer). The protagonist has 20 years of his life to live over.

The film depicts time travel. A middle-aged man from 1933 finds himself inhabiting the body of his younger self in 1910. He uses his knowledge of the future to change both the course off his own life, and a number of economic events.

== Plot ==
On March 6, 1933, Joe Gimlet, a middle-aged proprietor of a cigar store, encounters his childhood friend, banker Ted Wright. During a dinner engagement with Joe and his wife Mary, Ted presents an investment opportunity, urging the couple to commit $4,000 to his company. Despite Joe's enthusiasm for the proposal, Mary hesitates to relinquish their savings, provoking Joe's inebriated frustration. In a drunken stupor, Joe expresses regret for not marrying the affluent Elvina, a sentiment that exacerbates marital discord. Subsequently, Joe's intoxicated departure from their residence culminates in a car accident, necessitating hospitalization and surgery.

Upon regaining consciousness, Joe finds himself transported back to his youth, inhabiting the home of his upbringing. Surprised by the temporal displacement evidenced by a newspaper account of Roosevelt's African expedition, Joe cautiously navigates interactions with familiar acquaintances, opting to conceal his foreknowledge of future events. Engaging in routine employment as a soda jerk, he encounters Elvina, eventually entering into an engagement, oblivious to the emotional ramifications for his former flame, Mary, and his mother, who imparts wisdom regarding the illusory nature of wealth-induced happiness.

Joe's fortunes soar following his marriage to Elvina, leveraging his prescient insights into impending historical events to amass considerable wealth. Meanwhile, Mary and Ted embark on their own matrimonial journey. Despite his philanthropic gestures and public accolades, Joe's marriage to Elvina is marred by acrimony, exacerbated by financial mismanagement culminating in ruin following the stock market crash of 1929. Joe's subsequent divorce from Elvina precipitates a cascade of personal and professional setbacks, compounded by the betrayal of his bank employees and impending legal repercussions.

As Joe grapples with the ramifications of his actions, he experiences a surreal temporal convergence, returning to March 6, 1933, confronted with the stark reality of his circumstances. Fleeing from impending consequences, Joe implores Mary to abandon her current life for a shared escape, only to be apprehended by law enforcement. In a moment of existential reckoning, Joe awakens in the hospital, restored to the present moment, expressing gratitude for the life he shares with Mary, resigned to the immutable course of fate.

== Cast ==
- Lee Tracy as Joe Gimlet
- Mae Clarke as Mary Gimlet/Mary Wright
- Otto Kruger as Ted Wright
- George Barbier as Pete Evans
- Peggy Shannon as Elvina Evans Wright/Elvina Evans Gimlet
- C. Henry Gordon as Dave Holmes
- Clara Blandick as Mrs. Gimlet, Joe's Mother
- Three Stooges as Wedding Singers (uncredited)

=== The Three Stooges ===
The Three Stooges featuring Curly Howard appear in a short uncredited role as wedding singers. They sing "Sweet Adeline". Joe tells them to sing "something lively"; Larry Fine volunteers that they know "My Old Kentucky Home". Forgetting the difference in years while drunk, Joe requests the Stooges sing "Tony's Wife" (a pop song from 1933), which the Stooges are unfamiliar with; Moe Howard then asks "Tony's wife? Who is she?" Although they are not credited as the Three Stooges (indeed, they receive no screen credit at all), this marks the first time the trio appeared as a group on film without their former leader, Ted Healy. They would launch their long-running film-shorts career a few months later.

== See also ==
- The Three Stooges filmography
