= Alfred Drake =

American actor

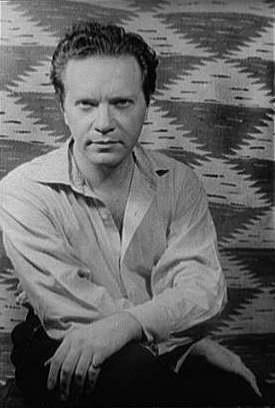
- Drake photographed by Carl Van Vechten in 1951
- Born: Alfred Capurro; October 7, 1914; New York City, New York, U.S.
- Died: July 25, 1992 (aged 77); New York City, New York, U.S.
- Occupations: Actor, singer

Alfred Drake (October 7, 1914 – July 25, 1992) was an American actor and singer.

== Biography ==
Born as Alfred Capurro in New York City, the son of parents emigrated from Recco, Genoa, Drake began his Broadway career while still a student at Brooklyn College. He is best known for his leading roles in the original Broadway productions of Oklahoma! and Kiss Me, Kate and for playing Marshall Blackstone in the original production of Babes in Arms, (in which he sang the title song) and Hajj in Kismet, for which he received the Tony Award. He was also a prolific Shakespearean, notably starring as Benedick in Much Ado About Nothing opposite Katharine Hepburn.

Drake was mostly a stage and television actor; he starred in only one film, Tars and Spars (1946), but played several roles on television, including providing the voice for the Great Ak in the Rankin-Bass stop-motion animated adaptation of the L. Frank Baum novel The Life and Adventures of Santa Claus. He appeared in a minor film role as president of the commodities exchange in the classic comedy Trading Places (1983), with Eddie Murphy and Dan Aykroyd. His first musical television appearance was as Captain Dick Warrington in the January 15, 1955 live telecast of the operetta Naughty Marietta. This followed by his portrayal of Marco Polo in Neil Simon's The Adventures of Marco Polo on NBC Television's musical anthology series Max Liebman Presents in 1956.

Drake headlined the musical stage version of Jean-Paul Sartre's "Kean" on Broadway in 1961 with a score by Forrest and Wright, although it was a major flop. His 1964 stage performance as Claudius in the Richard Burton Hamlet was filmed live on the stage of the Lunt-Fontanne Theatre, using a "quickie" process called Electronovision, and shown in movie theatres in a very limited engagement. It was also recorded on LP. His final appearance in a Broadway musical was in 1973–74 as Honoré Lachaille in Lerner and Loewe's Gigi. Two years later he starred in a revival of The Skin of Our Teeth.

As a director he staged the 1974 premiere of The Royal Rape of Ruari Macasmunde at the Virginia Museum Theater. He was inducted into the American Theatre Hall of Fame in 1981.

He was also a published author – writing at least a few plays: Dr. Willy Nilly, an adaptation of Molière's The Doctor in Spite of Himself, an adaptation of Goldoni's The Liar, and even at least one book on cards (specifically Gin rummy).

Drake was president of The Players from 1970 to 1978, a social club in New York City for people of the theatre founded by actor Edwin Booth in 1889.

== Death ==
Alfred Drake died of heart failure, after a long fight with cancer, in New York City on July 25, 1992, at age 77. He was survived by his wife Esther, his two daughters Candace Olmsted and Samantha Drake, and two grandchildren.

== Theatre credits ==
- The Gondoliers (1935)
- The Yeomen of the Guard (1935)
- The Pirates of Penzance (1935)
- The Mikado (1935)
- White Horse Inn (1936)
- Babes in Arms (1937)
- The Two Bouquets (1938)
- One for the Money (1939)
- The Straw Hat Revue (1939)
- Two for the Show (1940)
- Out of the Frying Pan (1941)
- As You Like It (1941)
- Oklahoma! (1943)
- Sing Out, Sweet Land (1944)
- Beggar's Holiday (1946)
- The Cradle Will Rock (1947)
- Kiss Me, Kate (1948)
- Joy to the World (1948)
- The Liar (1950)
- Courtin' Time (1951) – rare outing as a director
- The King and I (1952)
- The Gambler (1952)
- Kismet (1953)
- Marco Polo (1954)
- Kean (1961)
- Zenda (1963)
- Lorenzo (1963)
- Hamlet (1964), directed by Sir John Gielgud, with Richard Burton as co-star
- Those That Play the Clowns (1966)
- Song of the Grasshopper (1967)
- After You, Mr. Hyde (1968)
- On Time (1968)
- Gigi (1973)
- The Royal Rape of Ruari Macasmunde (1974) directed by Drake at the Virginia Museum Theater with Keith Fowler as Sir Roger Casement
- The Skin of Our Teeth (1975)
- Gambler's Paradise (1975)

== Filmography ==
Year	Title	Role	Notes
1946	Tars and Spars	Howard Young	
1964	Hamlet	Claudius	
1983	Trading Places	President of Exchange	
1985	The Life and Adventures of Santa Claus (1985 film)	The Great Ak (voice)	

== Radio ==
- Musical Comedy Theatre (1952) ("The Barkleys of Broadway")
