= Bambi Linn =

American actress and dancer (born 1926)

- Born: Bambina Aennchen Linnemeier; April 26, 1926 (age 100); New York City, U.S.
- Occupations: Actress; dancer
- Spouse: Rod Alexander (m. 1950; div. 1959) Joseph de Jesus (m. 1960)
- Children: 4

Bambi Linn (born Bambina Aennchen Linnemeier; April 26, 1926) is an American retired actress, dancer and choreographer.

== Early life and career ==
Born to Henry William Linnemeier (a surveyor and accountant) and Mary "Mimi" (Tweer) Linnemeier in 1926, Bambi Linn trained extensively with noted choreographer Agnes de Mille. At the age of 17, she made her Broadway debut in the original production of Oklahoma! (1943). With the death of actor George S. Irving, she became the last surviving cast member of the original opening night cast of Oklahoma!

De Mille used her again in Carousel (1945) as Louise, the daughter who gets slapped causing her father's return to purgatory, for which she earned a Theatre World Award. Linn repeated the role in the 1957 revival at City Center. Her other Broadway credits include the title role in Alice in Wonderland (1947) and Blanche in I Can Get It for You Wholesale (1962). Linn, who was a guest soloist with American Ballet Theatre, continued making occasional stage appearances until the early 1980s.

In the 1950s, Linn was best known as half of a ballroom dance team with her first husband, dancer Rod Alexander (né Burke). The two made frequent appearances on TV's Your Show of Shows, The Colgate Comedy Hour, Toast of the Town, and Max Liebman Presents, and others. Linn made only one film appearance: as the fantasy Laurey in the extended "Dream Ballet" sequence in Oklahoma! (1955). She and Alexander created a similar dream ballet for the live 1955 broadcast of The Desert Song.

== Personal life ==
After her divorce from Rod Alexander after nine years of marriage, she married Joseph DeJesus on August 4, 1960. Linn had one child by her first marriage and three children by her second marriage.

Linn turned 100 on April 26, 2026.

== See also ==
- List of centenarians (actors, filmmakers and entertainers)
