= One Alone =

One Alone is a popular love song composed by Sigmund Romberg with lyrics by Oscar Hammerstein II and Otto Harbach for their operetta The Desert Song; it is the "western" part of a scene in the operetta contrasting eastern and western notions of love. It was introduced by Robert Halliday.

== Cover versions ==
The song has been subsequently covered by Nat Shilkret and the Victor Orchestra, and Don Voorhees. Dave Brubeck recorded it on his 2002 album of the same name.
