= Salvatore Baccaloni =

Italian opera singer (1900–1969)

- Baccaloni as Dr. Bartolo in The Barber of Seville
- Born: 14 April 1900; Rome, Lazio, Italy
- Died: 31 December 1969 (aged 69); New York City, U.S.
- Occupations: Opera singer, buffo artist
- Years active: 1926–1962

Salvatore Baccaloni (14 April 1900 – 31 December 1969) was an Italian operatic bass and buffo artist.

== Life and career ==
Baccaloni was born in Rome. After attending the Sistine Chapel choir school from age seven, he studied voice with the celebrated baritone Giuseppe Kaschmann (Josip Kašman, 1847–1925), casting aside his previous ambitions of becoming an architect. He made his professional debut as Bartolo in The Barber of Seville, at Rome's Teatro Adriano, in 1922.

He sang for the first time at La Scala, Milan, in 1926, in Ildebrando Pizzetti's Debora e Jaele. Initially, he performed the standard bass parts there, such as Raimondo in Lucia di Lammermoor and Sparafucile in Rigoletto. However, on the advice of La Scala's principal conductor, Arturo Toscanini, he decided to specialise in comic roles. He thus went on to make an indelible impression as Leporello in Don Giovanni, Dulcamara in L'elisir d'amore, the title character in Don Pasquale, Varlaam in Boris Godunov, the title character in Falstaff and the name part in Gianni Schicchi. Baccaloni also sang supporting roles such as Benoît in La bohème and the Sacristan in Tosca. He created several operatic roles, too, including that of L'uomo di legge (the Lawyer) in Umberto Giordano's Il re (at La Scala in 1929) and parts in Riccardo Zandonai's La farsa amorosa (Rome, 1933) and Vigna by Guido Guerrini (Rome, 1935).

Baccaloni enjoyed a successful international career as well, making his debut at London's Royal Opera House, Covent Garden, as Timur in Turandot in 1928; at the Lyric Opera of Chicago as Melitone in La forza del destino in 1930; at the Glyndebourne Festival as Alfonso in Così fan tutte in 1936; at the San Francisco Opera as Leporello in 1938; and, at the Metropolitan Opera, on 7 December 1940, as Bartolo in The Marriage of Figaro and in 1952, Baccaloni toured with "The Stars of the Metropolitan Opera" South American tour alongside Jan Peerce, Norberto Ardelli, Stephan Ballarani, and more. He was to remain at the Met until 1962.

He often sang in Philadelphia with a succession of opera companies from 1951 through to 1966. He made his debut with the Philadelphia Civic Grand Opera Company in 1951 in the title role of Don Pasquale, his debut with the Philadelphia Grand Opera Company in 1956, as Benoît/Alcindoro in La bohème, and his debut with the Philadelphia Lyric Opera Company in 1959, as Benoît/Alcindoro.

In 1955, he appeared in the NBC live telecast of The Desert Song as the Caid of the Riff tribe, Ali Ben Ali.

He was rotund in build (at times he weighed more than 300 pounds).

== Other ==
Baccaloni formed his own opera company which toured the United States in the 1940s, Baccaloni Co.

== Death ==
Baccaloni died in New York City on 31 December 1969, aged 69. His voice is preserved on a number of recordings, many of which have been reissued on compact disc. He also appeared in several movies during the 1950s and '60s. On 27 April 1959, he appeared on The Danny Thomas Show starring Danny Thomas.

== Filmography ==
Year	Title	Role	Notes
1946	La viuda celosa		
1956	Full of Life	Papa Vittorio Rocco	
1958	Merry Andrew	Antonio Gallini	
1958	Rock-A-Bye Baby	Gigi 'Papa' Naples	
1961	Fanny	Escartifigue – Ferryboat Captain	
1962	The Pigeon That Took Rome	Ciccio Massimo	(final film role)

== Sources ==
- Alain Pâris, Dictionnaire des interprètes et de l'interpretation musicale au XX siècle (2 vols), Éditions Robert Laffont (Bouquins, Paris 1982, 4th Edn. 1995, 5th Edn 2004). ISBN 2-221-06660-X
- D. Hamilton (ed.),The Metropolitan Opera Encyclopedia: A Complete Guide to the World of Opera (Simon and Schuster, New York 1987). ISBN 0-671-61732-X
- Roland Mancini and Jean-Jacques Rouveroux, (orig. H. Rosenthal and J. Warrack, French edition), Guide de l’opéra, Les indispensables de la musique (Fayard, 1995). ISBN 2-213-59567-4
