= Delta Epsilon (fraternity) =

College fraternity in Virginia, US (defunct)

- ΔΕ
- Founded: 1862; 164 years ago Roanoke College
- Type: Social
- Affiliation: Independent
- Status: Defunct
- Defunct date: 1868
- Scope: Regional (Virginia)
- Chapters: 3
- Headquarters: Salem, Virginia; United States

Delta Epsilon (ΔΕ) was an American regional college fraternity for men. It was founded in 1862 at Roanoke College in Salem, Virginia.

== History ==
Delta Epsilon was established in 1862 at Roanoke College in Salem, Virginia. The founders intended to expand the fraternity to all Virginia colleges. Two additional chapter were established, including one at Hampden–Sydney College. The first edition of Baird's Manual suggests that all three chapters "were weak", ostensibly due to their formation in the tumultuous days leading up to the Civil War.

After establishing three chapters, Delta Epsilon became defunct in 1868. Alpha and one other chapter disbanded due to the Civil War. The chapter at Hampden–Sydney College survived the war but became the Zeta chapter of Beta Theta Pi in 1868. Baird's Manual 3rd edition(also known as the 2nd edition revised) describes the Zeta chapter of Beta Theta Pi as having been "killed by the War" but notes that it was revived with the adoption of Delta Epsilon's sole remaining chapter in 1869.

== Chapters ==
Chapter	Charter date and range	Institution	Location	Status	Ref.
Alpha	1862–186x ?	Roanoke College	Salem, Virginia	Inactive	(Note: Chapter went inactive due to the American Civil War.)
Beta	186x ?–186x ?	school unknown	Virginia ?	Inactive	(Note: Delta Epsilon was formed with the aim of expanding within Virginia. There is a narrow list of possible schools where this chapter could have been: Washington and Lee College, the University of Virginia, Randolph-Macon College, and the Virginia Military Institute. None of the other Virginia institutions would fit what is known about this fraternity and its dates of operation, if, as it appears, the organization focused on 4-year schools. As to any other 4-year schools, the College of William & Mary and Emory and Henry College closed in 1861 due to the Civil War. Note that is also possible, but unlikely, that the chapter formed at Bethany College in West Virginia, a state that seceded from Virginia in 1861 and joined into the Union (North) as a separate state in June 1863. While there is an even slimmer possibility that this chapter was at WVU, again, in seceding West Virginia, it did not (at least) become the Kappa Sig chapter there, which would have offered a plausible solution due to timing: But their archives have no mention of Delta Epsilon in relation to their Gamma-Phi chapter.)
Gamma	186x ?–1868	Hampden–Sydney College	Hampden Sydney, Virginia	Merged (ΒΘΠ)	(Note: This chapter became the Zeta chapter of Beta Theta Pi in 1868, reestablishing the chapter that went inactive during the Civil War. It survived for 140 years, but in 2012 was declared inactive.)
