= Gale Sherwood =

Canadian singer and actress (1929–2017)

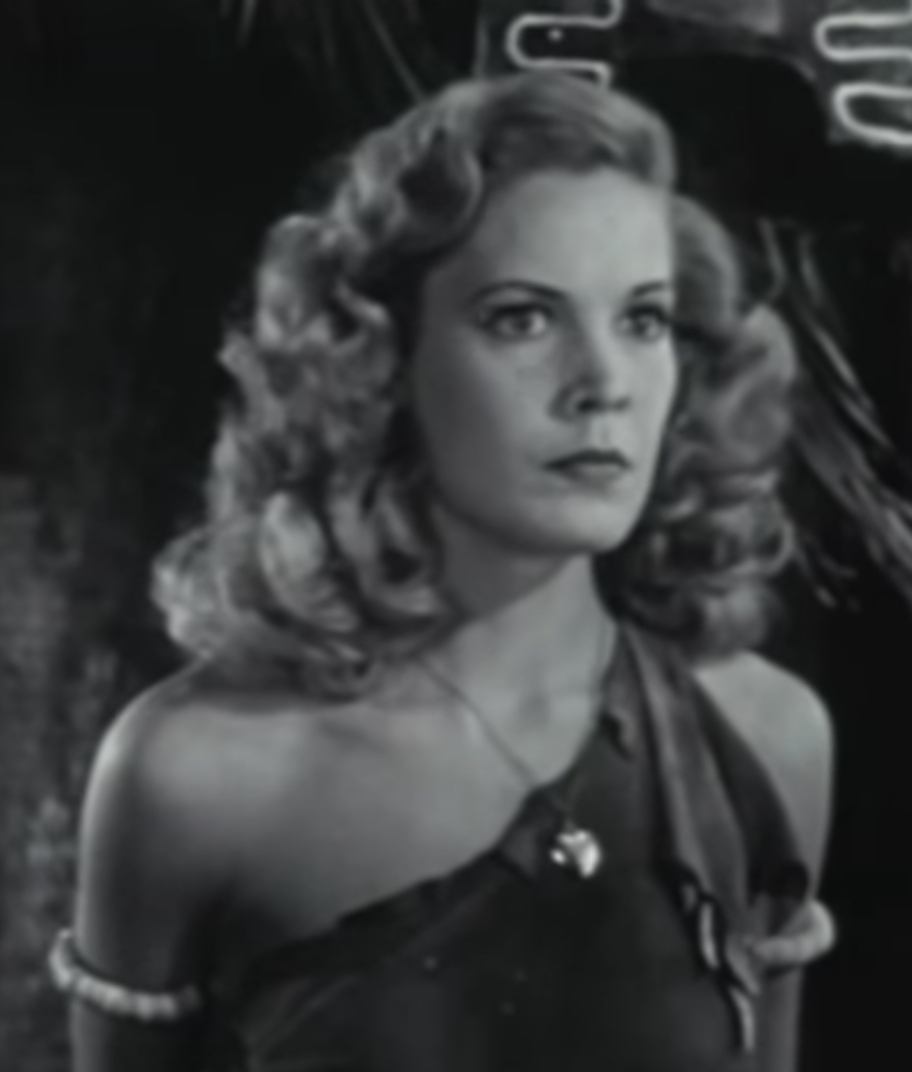
- Sherwood in Blonde Savage (1947)
- Born: Jacqueline Nash; March 4, 1929; Hamilton, Ontario, Canada
- Died: December 31, 2017 (aged 88); Florida, U.S.
- Other names: Jacqueline Nutt
- Occupations: Actress; singer
- Years active: 1932–1967

Gale Sherwood (born Jacqueline Nash; (Note: Sherwood stated in 1967 that her birth name was Jacqueline Nutt. See Thomas, Bob. "Gale Sherwood, Eddy Partner, Makes Debut", The San Bernardino Sun, September 19, 1967, p. B-9) March 4, 1929 – December 31, 2017) was a Canadian singer and actress. She was best known as the singing partner of Nelson Eddy from 1953 until his death in 1967.

== Early life ==
The daughter of Mrs. Minette Nash, Sherwood was born in Hamilton, Ontario and graduated in 1945 from the Mar-Ken School, a preparatory high school that catered to children in (or with parents in) the entertainment industry in Hollywood, California. Her mother began training her musically when Sherwood was 18 months old. She became the youngest person to sing on the Canadian Broadcasting Corporation when she did so at age 3 and a half. At the age of 5 she began singing on Canadian radio, three years before her family moved to California. When Sherwood was 9 years old, producer Samuel Goldwyn signed her to a film contract.

== Career ==
Her film and television roles included juvenile roles as Betty in They Shall Have Music (1939) and High School Singer in Let's Make Music (1941). As an adult, she appeared as Meelah in Blonde Savage (1947), Ellen Forrester in Rocky, Sophia in Song of My Heart (1948), Yvonne in Naughty Marietta (TV 1955), Morgan Le Fay in A Connecticut Yankee (TV 1955) and Margot, opposite Eddy, in The Desert Song (TV 1955).

Sherwood sang with Eddy on television and in his nightclub act from 1953 until his death in 1967. Her stage roles included Julie in Show Boat in 1967 with the Los Angeles Civic Light Opera. After she retired from performing, she lived in Boca Raton, Florida.

== Death ==
Sherwood died on New Year's Eve in 2017, at the age of 88, in Florida. She was divorced from her first husband, Howard Wayne McCoy, Jr., and was the widow of Charles Edward Francis.

== Sources ==
- Lentz, Harris M. III (2018). Obituaries in the Performing Arts, 2017. McFarland. ISBN 9781476633183.
