= Max Liebman Presents =

American musical variety TV series (1954–1956)

- Also known as: Max Liebman Spectaculars
- Country of origin: United States
- Original language: English
- No. of episodes: 28

Original release
- Network: NBC
- Release: September 12, 1954 – June 9, 1956

Max Liebman Presents, a.k.a. Max Liebman Spectaculars, is an American television musical variety series, presented monthly in a 90-minute format on NBC, beginning September 12, 1954, and ending on June 6, 1956. Throughout the show's run, episodes were broadcast on Saturdays beginning at 9 p.m. Eastern Time. In the second season, the same title was also used for a show with a different format on Sundays beginning at 7:30 p.m. ET.

== Overview ==
Saturday episodes consisted mainly of musical comedies, the first of which was Satins and Spurs. They included Babes in Toyland, Best Foot Forward, Lady in the Dark, and The Merry Widow. Featured performers included John Conte, Robert Cummings, Dennis Day, Dave Garroway, Edward Everett Horton, Ann Jeffreys, Jack E. Leonard, and Marilyn Maxwell.

Episodes on Sundays were musical revues. Bambi Linn and Rod Alexander formed a dance team that appeared regularly, and Charles Sanford's orchestra often provided music. Among the guest stars were Judy Holliday, Steve Allen, Frank Sinatra, Marcel Marceau, Tony Randall, Ann Sothern and Maurice Chevalier.

Pat Weaver, who was president of NBC then, considered "a string of high-profile ninety-minute spectaculars" as a way "to court the light viewer" of television. However, productions that cost $500,000 (Lady in the Dark) and $300,000 (Satins and Spurs) "were trounced in the ratings by much cheaper programming".

== Production ==
Max Liebman produced and directed the program. Authors included Billy Friedberg, Will Glickman, Al Schwartz, Fred Saidy, Neil Simon, and Elmer Rice. Max Liebman produced and directed. Choreographer James Starbuck was nominated for the Primetime Emmy Award for Outstanding Choreography for his work on the program in 1956.

Sponsors included Oldsmobile Hazel Bishop, Sunbeam, and Reynolds Metals.

== Related merchandise ==
Capitol Records released a 10-inch long-playing original-cast album that contained eight songs from the show's Satins and Spurs episode.

Selected episodes of Max Liebman Presents
Date	Title	Actors
November 7, 1954	Fanfare	Steve Allen, Judy Holliday, Dick Shawn, Frank Sinatra, Jacques Tati
January 2, 1955	Good Times	Judy Holliday, Steve Allen, Dick Shawn, the Ritz Brothers
January 15, 1955	Naughty Marietta	Patrice Munsel, Alfred Drake
October 1, 1955	Heidi	Wally Cox, Jeannie Carson, Elsa Lanchester, Natalie Wood
January 21, 1956	Paris in the Springtime	Dan Dailey, Gale Sherwood, Helen Gallagher, Jack Whiting, Carleton Carpenter
April 14, 1956	The Adventures of Marco Polo	Alfred Drake, Doretta Morrow
