= The Desert Song (1953 film) =

1953 film by H. Bruce Humberstone

- Directed by: H. Bruce Humberstone
- Screenplay by: Roland Kibbee
- Based on: The Desert Song; 1926 play/book by Oscar Hammerstein II; Otto A. Harbach; Frank Mandel; Sigmund Romberg; Laurence Schwab
- Produced by: Rudi Fehr
- Starring: Kathryn Grayson; Gordon MacRae; Raymond Massey
- Cinematography: Robert Burks
- Edited by: William H. Ziegler
- Music by: Max Steiner
- Distributed by: Warner Bros. Pictures
- Release date: May 30, 1953
- Running time: 110 minutes
- Country: United States
- Language: English
- Box office: $2 million (US)

The Desert Song is a 1953 film version in Technicolor of Sigmund Romberg's operetta. It is the third film version of the operetta, the third made by Warner Bros. Pictures, and the second in full three-strip Technicolor. Although it was released in 1953, it was not made in widescreen; at that time Twentieth-Century Fox held the rights to Cinemascope, which was introduced that year in the film The Robe.

== Plot ==
The original plot is more-or-less adhered to, with some significant alterations. Benny is depicted as a comic Bob Hope-like coward, but not as a sissy. El Khobar's alter ego is that of a mild-mannered (but not squeamish) Latin tutor and anthropologist, whom Birabeau (Ray Collins) hires to keep Margot (Kathryn Grayson) from flirting with his regiment.

The conclusion to the film is slightly different, since El Khobar (Gordon MacRae) is not Birabeau's son here. After the final battle, the General's soldiers realize that El Khobar and the Riffs were actually on their side and helped in preventing an uprising. When one asks, "And where is El Khobar?", MacRae, as the professor, enters carrying El Khobar's clothes, and quietly announces "El Khobar is dead". Margot is grief-stricken, but Birabeau, suspecting the truth, mischievously says that they can all be grateful to "the ghost of El Khobar", winking as he says this. As soon as they are alone, MacRae begins to sing the song One Alone to Margot, making her realize that her boring Latin tutor and the dashing El Khobar are one and the same. She rushes into his arms.

One song not by Romberg, "Gay Parisienne", written for the 1943 film version of the show, was retained for this film.

== Cast ==
- Kathryn Grayson (soprano) as Margot Birabeau
- Gordon MacRae (baritone) as Paul Bonnard / El Khobar, the dashing outlaw leader
- Steve Cochran as Captain Claud Fontaine (El Khobar's rival for Margot's affections)
- Raymond Massey as Sheik Youseff (the villain)
- Dick Wesson as Benjamin 'Benjy' Kidd
- Allyn McLerie as Azuri, an Arabian dancing girl
- Ray Collins as General Birabeau (here depicted as Margot's father, rather than the hero's father)
- Paul Picerni as Hassan (El Khobar's second-in-command)
- Frank DeKova as Mindar
- William Conrad as Lachmed
- Trevor Bardette as Neri
- Mark Dana as Lt. Duvalle

== Music ==
The film features about eight numbers from the original score, but all of the songs (unlike those in the stage version), are given to either MacRae or Grayson (or both), or the chorus.

1. Overture
2. The Riff Song - El Khobar, Riffs
3. Romance - Margot
4. The Desert Song - Paul
5. Gay Parisienne - Margot, soldiers
6. * Azuri's Dance - Azuri, women's dance ensemble
7. One Flower Grows Alone In Your Garden - Margot
8. One Alone - El Khobar, Margot
9. The Desert Song (reprise) - El Khobar, Margot
10. Long Live the Night - Margot
11. One Alone (reprise) - Paul, Margot
12. The Riff Song (reprise) - Riffs (sung over the end credits)
