= Goodnight Vienna (disambiguation) =

Goodnight Vienna is a 1974 album by Ringo Starr.

Goodnight Vienna may also refer to:

- Goodnight, Vienna, a 1932 British musical film
  - Goodnight Vienna, radio operetta and song on which the film is based, by Eric Maschwitz and George Posford
  - "Goodnight, Vienna", several 1932 78 rpm singles by Al Bowlly
- "(It's All Down to) Goodnight Vienna", a song by John Lennon on Ringo Starr's album Goodnight Vienna
- Goodnight Vienna Productions, the production company for Peter Kay's comedy output
- "Vienna 92 (Goodnight Vienna remix)", a 1992 version of "Vienna" (Ultravox song)
- "Goodnight Vienna", an episode of TV series Shine on Harvey Moon
