= Reg Dixon (comedian) =

British comedian (1915–1984)

- Born: Reginald Arthur Dixon; 24 February 1915; Coventry, Warwickshire, England
- Died: 25 June 1984 (aged 69); Bournemouth, England
- Occupation: Comedian

Reginald Arthur Dixon (24 February 1915 – 25 June 1984), always known professionally as Reg Dixon to distinguish him from the ballroom organist, was a British comedian, best known for his appearances on stage and radio.

== Biography ==
Born in Coventry, the youngest of seven children, he made his first onstage appearance there at the age of ten, and sang with local dance bands. At first he worked in local factories, but at the age of 16 left home to join a series of touring revues. At one time, he was part of a double act, Scott and Dixon, with a pianist. In the late 1930s, he toured with his own fit-up show through the north of England and Scotland. He served in India, Burma and the Middle East with the Royal Air Force in the Second World War, and then joined Ralph Reader's Gang Show.

His comedy style was described as lugubrious, in the tradition of earlier northern English performers such as Jack Pleasants, Alfred Lester, and George Formby Sr. He often described himself with the phrase "I'm not well, I'm proper poorly". In one part of his act, he would borrow a supposedly valuable violin from the orchestra, then destroy it while attempting to play a waltz; with the instrument held together by its strings, he would admit to having "scratched" it, and when told it was a vintage instrument say "Good job it wasn’t a new one!”. The entertainer Roy Hudd described him as "an excellent comic whose gentle, daft, almost whispered confidences were a breath of fresh air."

Dixon made his first London appearance in 1946, and then rose to national fame through regular appearances on the BBC radio show Variety Bandbox. He featured in the 1949 Royal Variety Performance, and in 1952 gained his first starring role in the West End, replacing George Formby in the show Zip Goes a Million at the Palace Theatre. The same year, he was in his second Royal Variety Performance, as part of a "Songs that Made the Halls" finale. He wrote and recorded the song "Confidentially" — another of his catchphrases — which became a sheet music hit and was recorded by other artists including The Beverley Sisters, Max Bygraves, and Danny Kaye. He also adopted Jack Pleasants' song "I'm Shy, Mary Ellen" as his own.

He appeared in the 1953 comic film Love in Pawn, and in 1955 starred in the film No Smoking. He continued to work in clubs and pantomimes, particularly in the north of England and the Midlands. He later scaled down his work due to ill health, and owned a farm at Fillongley, Warwickshire, but made a final television appearance in an episode of Are You Being Served? in 1976.

He retired to Bournemouth, where he died in 1984, at the age of 69.
