= Zip Goes a Million =

1951 musical by Eric Maschwitz and George Posford

- Programme for the 1951 West End production
- Music: George Posford; Debroy Somers (MD)
- Lyrics: Eric Maschwitz
- Book: Eric Maschwitz
- Basis: Brewster's Millions
- Productions: 1951 West End; 1953 UK tour 1954 Australia; 2001 London

Zip Goes a Million is a musical with a book and lyrics by Eric Maschwitz and music by George Posford, based on the 1902 novel Brewster's Millions. It premiered in London in 1951, starring George Formby, and ran for 544 performances.

== Synopsis ==
Percy Piggott, a window cleaner, stands to inherit a fortune. To receive the money, however, he is required to spend a million dollars in a hurry without letting anyone know what he is doing. He decides to invest in a musical comedy, The Garter Girl, starring Lilac Delaney, which he thinks will be a failure. Other spendthrift ideas include putting money in the stock market and betting on the ponies. Each of these dubious investments is a success, even though a shady banker, Van Norden, and his daughter try to separate Percy from his money and from Sally Whittle, Percy's innocent girlfriend. In the second act, on a South Seas island, Percy succeeds in wrecking a yacht, which is hugely expensive to salvage. After various complications, Percy finishes spending the million dollars and finally inherits the money.

== Musical numbers ==
Act I

- "Ridin' Into Town" –
- "I'm Saving Up For Sally" – Percy and Chorus
- "The Thing About You" – Lilac and Buddy
- "Ordinary People" – Percy and Company
- "Zip Goes A Million" – Percy and Company
- "It Takes No Time To Fall In Love" – Percy and Sally
- "The Story of Chiquita" – Lilac, Girls and Boys
- "Nothing Breaks But The Heart" – Buddy
- "I Owe You" – Percy and Sally
- "I'm Saving Up For Sally" (reprise) –
- "Big Business" –
- "Trouble With My Heart" – Motty and Sally
- "Zip Goes A Million" (reprise) –

Act II

- "Raratonga" –
- "Pleasure Cruise" –
- "Running Away To Land" –
- "The Garter Girl" – Lilac and cast of The Garter Girl
- "Thou Art For Me" –
- "Ordinary People" (reprise) –
- "Finale" – Company

== History ==
Zip is based on the 1902 novel Brewster's Millions by G. B. McCutcheon and a 1906 play adaptation of the same novel by Winchell Smith and Byron Ongly. In 1919, a musical adaptation of the novel, with music by Jerome Kern, including "Look for the Silver Lining" was slated to open on Broadway, but it closed after out of town tryouts.

Maschwitz began writing the piece for variety performer George Formby, who had never starred in a musical. After writing most of the libretto, Maschwitz discovered that the theatrical impresario Emile Littler had the same idea. Instead of duelling over the work, however, they joined forces, with Littler as producer and Maschwitz writing book and lyrics. Maschwitz had already worked with composer Posford on Balalaika, Goodnight Vienna and Magyar Melody.

Formby starred as Percy Piggott, the "innocent Lancashire window cleaner". Sara Gregory was cast as his love interest Sally, and Wallas Eaton as her father, Motty. To build upon the fact that Zip is set in the United States, Littler cast two American performers: Warde Donovan as Buddy, and Barbara Perry as Lilac.

== Productions ==
Zip Goes a Million began its pre-London tryout at the Hippodrome, Coventry, on 4 September 1951. The production was directed by Charles Hickman, with choreography by Pauline Grant. The production nearly did not open, as Perry had not "paid her 'Equity premium for foreign performers' (she belonged to the Variety Artistes' Federation, which she felt was sufficient) and all the actors were called out on strike by Equity." Maschwitz paid the fee himself after a court hearing, and the musical began its run. Another tryout took place from 17 September to 16 October 1951 at the Palace Theatre in Manchester, where the musical was trimmed and several musical numbers were cut.

Zip then opened in the West End at the Palace Theatre, London, on 20 October 1951, where it was heralded as "a first-rate musical and a sturdy rival for any importation from across the sea." Six months into the run, however, Formby suffered a heart attack and was forced to withdraw from the production. He was replaced by comedian Reg Dixon, who remained with Zip Goes a Million until it closed after 544 performances on 7 February 1953. An abridged cast recording with Dixon was released in 1953 as Zip Goes a Million: A Musical Extravagance.

After the West End run, two touring companies were formed; one with Dixon as Percy and Pamela Charles as Sally (1953) and another with Charlie Chester starring as Percy (1954).

The Australian production, presented by Tivoli Theatre Circuit, opened at the Tivoli Theatre, Sydney on 17 April 1954. British comedian Roy Barbour starred as Percy, alongside Nina Cooke as Sally, Tony Fontane as Buddy, Kerry Vaughn as Paula Van Norden, and Margaret Brown as Lilac. The Melbourne season opened on 30 October 1954 at the Tivoli Theatre, Melbourne. At the time, the lavish costumes for Zip were the most expensive of any show ever brought to Australia.

Beginning in April 2001, the Theatre Museum in London staged a revival of Zip, playing for a limited run until May 2001. The cast starred Gavin Lee as Percy and Zoe Curlett as Sally. The cast recording of this production, Zip Goes A Million (Original London Cast Recording), was the first full recording of the score.
