= Nelson Eddy =

American actor and singer (1901–1967)

- Eddy in 1935
- Born: Nelson Ackerman Eddy; June 29, 1901; Olneyville, Rhode Island, U.S.
- Died: March 6, 1967 (aged 65); Miami Beach, Florida, U.S.
- Resting place: Hollywood Forever Cemetery
- Occupations: Singer; actor
- Years active: 1922–1967
- Spouse: Ann Denitz Franklin (m. 1939)
- Partner: Jeanette MacDonald (1935-1965)

Nelson Ackerman Eddy (June 29, 1901 – March 6, 1967) was an American actor and baritone singer who appeared in 19 musical films during the 1930s and 1940s, as well as in opera and on the concert stage, radio, television, and in nightclubs. A classically trained baritone, he is best remembered for the eight films in which he costarred with soprano Jeanette MacDonald. He was one of the first "crossover" stars, a superstar appealing both to shrieking bobby soxers and opera purists, and in his heyday, he was the highest paid singer in the world.

During his 40-year career, he earned three stars on the Hollywood Walk of Fame (one each for film, recording, and radio), left his footprints in the wet concrete at Grauman's Chinese Theatre, earned three gold records, and was invited to sing at the third inauguration of U.S. President Franklin D. Roosevelt in 1941. He also introduced millions of young Americans to classical music and inspired many of them to pursue a musical career.

== Early life ==
Eddy was born in the Olneyville neighborhood of Providence, Rhode Island, the only child of Caroline Isabel (née Kendrick) and William Darius Eddy. Nelson grew up in Providence and Pawtucket, Rhode Island, and in New Bedford, Massachusetts, attending many different schools. As a boy, he was a strawberry blond and quickly acquired the nickname "Bricktop". As an adult, his reddish hair prematurely whitened, so his hair photographed as blond.

He came from a musical family. Both of his parents were singers, which resulted in him singing very young. His Atlanta-born mother was a church soloist, and his grandmother, Caroline Netta Ackerman Kendrick, was a distinguished oratorio singer. His father occasionally moonlighted as a stagehand at the Providence Opera House, sang in the church choir, played the drums, and performed in local productions such as H.M.S. Pinafore.

Eddy was close with his mother and his father's grandparents, staying at their farm a lot.

According to divorce court documents and testimony, Eddy's parents had a troubled marriage. Bill Eddy was reportedly an alcoholic who frequently lost jobs, sometimes after only two or three days, contributing to the family's financial instability and frequent moves. The testimony described Isabel Eddy and her son as experiencing physical and verbal abuse. Bill Eddy left the family on June 15, 1915, when their son was nearly fourteen. Isabel Eddy filed for divorce two years later, stating that Nelson had written to his father seeking financial help but received a reply saying that no help would be forthcoming.

Living in near poverty, Eddy was forced in 1915 to drop out of school and moved with his mother to Philadelphia, where her brother, Clark Kendrick, lived. His uncle helped Eddy secure a clerical job at the Mott Iron Works, a plumbing supply company. He later worked as a reporter with The Philadelphia Press, the Evening Public Ledger, and the Philadelphia Evening Bulletin. He also worked briefly as a copywriter at N.W. Ayer Advertising but was dismissed for constantly singing on the job. Eddy never returned to school and instead educated himself through correspondence courses.

== Career ==
=== Singing ===
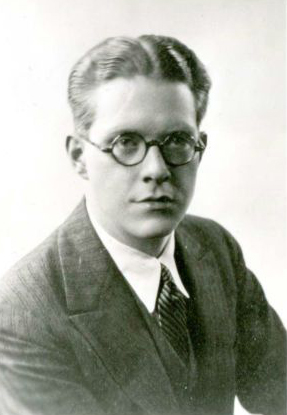
Nelson Eddy, 1920s

Eddy developed his talent as a boy soprano in church choirs. Throughout his teens, Eddy studied voice and imitated the recordings of baritones such as Titta Ruffo, Antonio Scotti, Pasquale Amato, Giuseppe Campanari, and Reinald Werrenrath. He gave recitals for women's groups and appeared in society theatricals, usually for little or no pay. He took voice lessons with Sidney Dietch.

Eddy had a job in an iron works factory and then spent ten years as a newspaper reporter. He was fired for paying more attention to music than to journalism. His first professional break came in 1922, when the press singled him out after an appearance in a society theatrical, The Marriage Tax, although his name had been omitted from the program.

On May 18, 1923, Eddy made his operatic debut in Aida at the Philadelphia Operatic Society. The Philadelphia Record review: "Nelson Eddy, as Amonasro, had an electrifying effect on the audience. A young singer, scarcely 20 years of age, with that undefinable gift so seldom seen of arresting the auditor's interest and holding it continuously, Mr. Eddy was a star from the moment he appeared on the stage."

In 1924, Eddy won the top prize in a competition, was appearing with the Philadelphia Civic Opera Company and had a repertoire of 28 operatic roles,including Amonasro in Aida, Marcello in La bohème, Papageno in The Magic Flute, Almaviva in The Marriage of Figaro, both Tonio and Silvio in Pagliacci, and Wolfram in Tannhäuser.

Eddy performed in Gilbert and Sullivan operas with the Savoy Company, the oldest amateur theater company in the world devoted exclusively to the works of Gilbert and Sullivan. With Savoy, Eddy sang the leading role of Strephon in Iolanthe at the Broad Street Theatre in Philadelphia in 1922. The next year, he played the role of Major-General Stanley in Savoy's production of The Pirates of Penzance. He reprised the role of Strephon with Savoy in 1927, when the group moved their performances to the Academy of Music. Thirty-one years later, he was asked for advice by a new Strephon with the company. Eddy wrote: "I envy you. I'd like to play Strephon again, too! The one thing I suggest is to keep him gay, happy, and care-free. You can set the character with your first entrance. Dance in with a sort of cute abandon. Then in "Good morrow, good mother" act joyfully in love. The rest will fall right into line. The first time I did it – at the old Broad Street Theatre – was better than when I did it at the Academy. I let myself get impressed with the importance of the latter house and with my growing experience in opera – and I played it too grand. Don't fall into that trap. Good luck and my very best wishes – to you and all the Company. Sincerely, Nelson Eddy."

Eddy studied briefly with the noted teacher David Bispham, a former Metropolitan Opera singer, but when Bispham died suddenly, Eddy became a student of William Vilonat. In 1927, Eddy borrowed some money and followed his teacher to Dresden for further study in Europe, which was then considered essential for serious American singers. He was offered a job with a small German opera company. Instead, he decided to return to America where he concentrated on his concert career, making only occasional opera appearances during the next seven years. In 1928, his first concert accompanist was a young pianist named Theodore (Ted) Paxson, who became a close friend and remained his accompanist until Eddy's death 39 years later. In the early 1930s, Eddy's principal teacher was Edouard Lippé, who followed him to Hollywood and appeared in a small role in Eddy's 1935 film Naughty Marietta. In his later years, Eddy changed teachers frequently, constantly learning new vocal techniques. He also had a home recording studio where he studied his own performances. It was his fascination with technology that inspired him to record three-part harmonies (tenor, baritone, and bass) as well as all the voices for his role as a multiple-voiced singing whale in the animated Walt Disney segment, "The Whale Who Wanted to Sing at the Met", the concluding sequence in the 1946 package film Make Mine Music.

With the Philadelphia Civic Opera, Eddy sang in the first American performance of Feuersnot by Richard Strauss (December 1, 1927) and in the first American performance of Strauss's Ariadne auf Naxos (November 1, 1928) with Helen Jepson. In Ariadne, Eddy sang the roles of the Wigmaker and Harlequin in the original German. He performed under Leopold Stokowski as the Drum Major in the second American performance of Alban Berg's Wozzeck on November 24, 1931.

Eddy ventured only once into vaudeville. In May 1929, he starred in "Carmen Fantasy", singing the "Toreodor Song;" Helen Jepson sang Micaela's aria, and the Catherine Littlefield ballet group danced. This was the pre-show for the screening of A Man's Man, starring William Haines, Josephine Dunn, with John Gilbert and Greta Garbo playing themselves.

At Carnegie Hall in New York City, Christmas 1931, he sang in the world premiere of Maria egiziaca (Mary in Egypt), unexpectedly conducted by the composer Ottorino Respighi himself when famed conductor Arturo Toscanini fell ill at the last minute. Years later, when Toscanini visited the MGM lot in California, Eddy greeted him by singing a few bars of Maria egiziaca.

Eddy continued in occasional opera roles until his film work made it difficult to schedule appearances the requisite year or two in advance. Among his final opera performances were three with the San Francisco Opera in 1934 when he was still "unknown". He also sang Amonasro in Aida on November 11, 1934, to similar acclaim. Elisabeth Rethberg, Giovanni Martinelli, and Ezio Pinza were in the cast. However, opera quietly faded from Eddy's schedule as films and highly lucrative concerts claimed more and more of his time.

When he resumed his concert career following his screen success, he made a point of delivering a traditional concert repertoire, performing his hit screen songs only as encores. He felt strongly that audiences needed to be exposed to all kinds of music.

=== Hollywood ===
Eddy was "discovered" by Hollywood when he substituted at the last minute for the noted diva Lotte Lehmann at a sold-out concert in Los Angeles on February 28, 1933. He scored a professional triumph with 18 curtain calls, and several film offers immediately followed. After much agonizing, he decided that being seen on screen might boost audiences for what he considered his "real work", his concerts. (Also, like his machinist father, he was fascinated with gadgets and the mechanics of the new talking pictures.) Eddy's concert fee rose from $500 to $10,000 per performance.

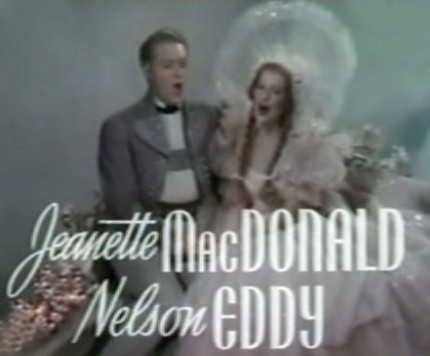
Eddy and MacDonald from the trailer for Sweethearts (1938): The pair acted in eight films together.

Eddy signed with Metro-Goldwyn-Mayer (MGM), where he made the first 15 of his 19 feature films. His contract guaranteed him three months off each year to continue his concert tours. MGM was not sure how to use him, and he spent more than a year on salary with little to do. His voice can be heard singing "Daisy Bell" on the soundtrack of the 1933 Pete Smith short Handlebars. He sang one song each in Broadway to Hollywood and Dancing Lady (both 1933). Louis B. Mayer was unimpressed, and Eddy was prepared to leave MGM when his six-month option expired, preferring concerts and opera.

By November 1933, Eddy and MacDonald had their first date at a party at the home of Doris Kenyon. On November 9, they both sang on a national radio broadcast celebrating Marie Dressler's birthday. MacDonald attended Eddy's Los Angeles recital on November 21 and his San Francisco recital on November 22. Before Eddy's option lapsed, MacDonald persuaded Mayer to extend it so Eddy could co-star with her in Naughty Marietta. She insisted he have equal billing and on his singing one of her proposed songs, "Neath the Southern Moon." Mayer agreed, and Naughty Marietta was filmed during Eddy's two contract extensions. The trades announced his casting in January 1934.

MacDonald had a prior commitment to The Merry Widow, her final pairing with Maurice Chevalier. The production was expensive and lengthy, with English and French versions filmed simultaneously. Eddy used the interval to return to concerts and opera. MGM used him only once during this period, in the B-picture Student Tour. Again, he sang one song but played himself as a famous concert artist. He also had a very short scene giving advice to a young woman.

Naughty Marietta was the surprise hit of 1935. Its key song, "Ah! Sweet Mystery of Life", became a hit and earned Eddy his first gold record. He also sang "Tramp, Tramp, Tramp" and "I'm Falling in Love with Someone". The film was nominated for an Oscar for Best Picture, received the Photoplay Gold Medal Award as Best Picture, and was voted one of the Ten Best Pictures of 1935 by the New York film critics. Critics singled out Eddy for praise:

- "A new movie star emerged from the Capitol screen..." — New York Daily News.
- "The screen has found a thrilling thrush, possessed not only of a rare vocal tone, but of a personality and form and features cast in the heroic mold." – New York American.
- "Eddy ... has a brilliant baritone voice. He is engaging and good looking..." – Richard Watts, Jr., in the New York Herald.

Eddy appeared in seven more MGM films with Jeanette MacDonald:

- Rose Marie (1936) is probably his most-remembered film. Eddy sang "Song of the Mounties" and "Indian Love Call" by Rudolf Friml. His definitive portrayal of the steadfast Mountie became a popular icon, frequently spoofed in cartoons and TV skits, and even generating travesties on stage (Little Mary Sunshine, 1959). One long-lived imitation, Dudley Do-Right , began as a cartoon character on The Rocky and Bullwinkle Show (1959-1964) and went on to be portrayed by Brendan Fraser in a live-action film, Dudley Do-Right (1999). When the Mounties retired their classic red jackets and campaign hats in 1970, except for ceremonial attire, hundreds of newspapers accompanied the story with a photo of Nelson Eddy as Sgt. Bruce in Rose Marie, made 34 years earlier.
- Maytime (1937) is regarded as one of Eddy's best films. "Will You Remember" by Sigmund Romberg brought Eddy another gold record. Frank Nugent wrote in The New York Times that the film [was] "the most entrancing operetta the screen has given us. ... and it affirms Nelson Eddy's preeminence among the baritones of filmdom".
- The Girl of the Golden West (1938) had an original score by Sigmund Romberg and reused the David Belasco stage plot also employed by Giacomo Puccini for La Fanciulla del West.

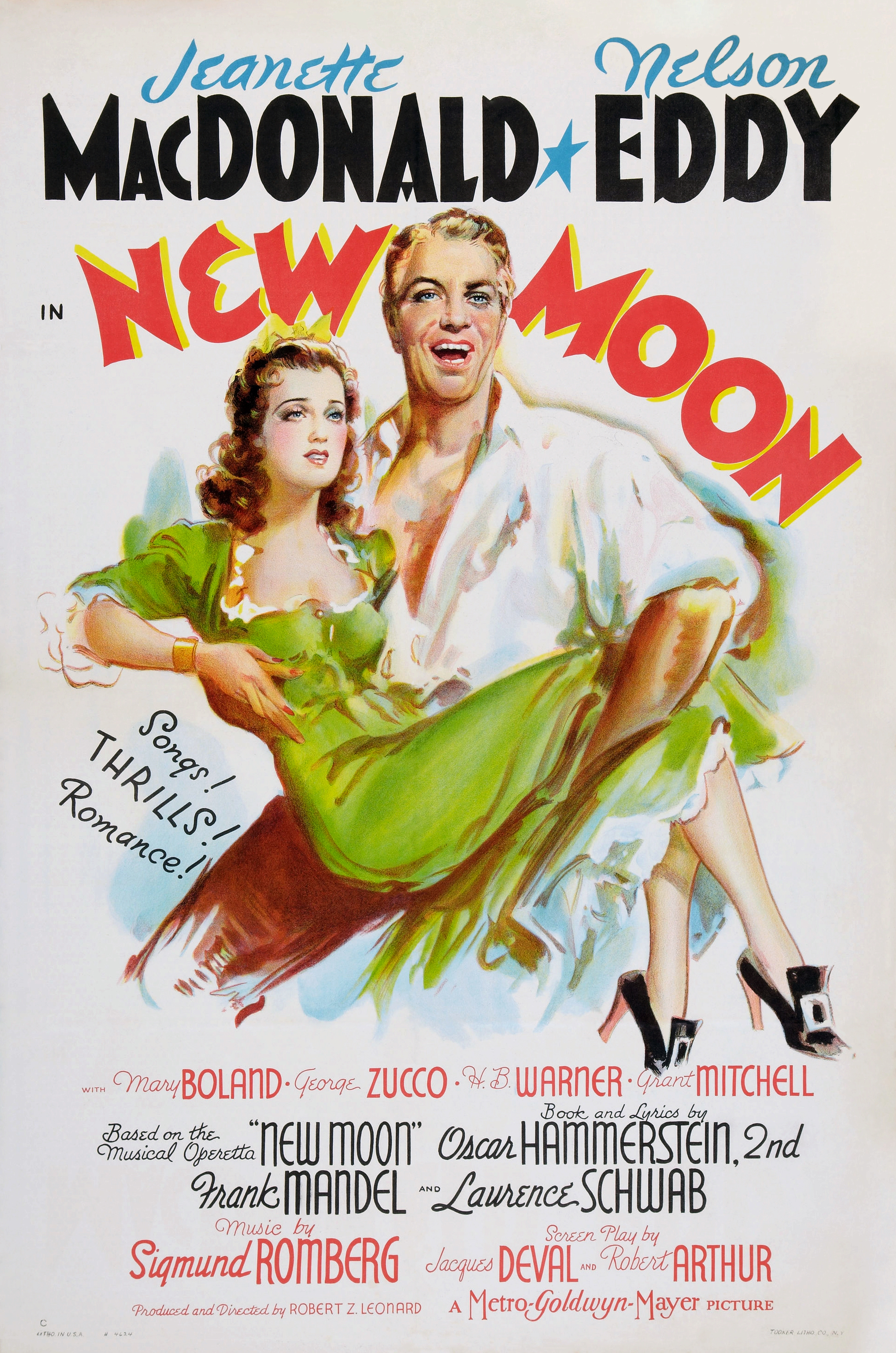
New Moon (1940)

- Sweethearts (1938) was MGM's first three-strip Technicolor feature, incorporating Victor Herbert's 1913 stage score into a modern script by Dorothy Parker. It won the Photoplay Gold Medal Award as Best Picture of the Year.
- New Moon (1940) based on Romberg's 1927 Broadway hit, became one of Eddy's most popular films, although in 1978 it was included in the book The Fifty Worst Films of All Time. His key songs were "Lover, Come Back to Me", "Softly as in a Morning Sunrise", "Wanting You", and "Stout Hearted Men".
- Bitter Sweet (1940) was a Technicolor film version of Noël Coward's 1929 operetta. The love theme was "I'll See You Again". Eddy played a Viennese singing teacher who elopes with his pretty English pupil and takes her to live in Vienna.
- I Married an Angel (1942), adapted from the Rodgers and Hart stage musical about an angel who loses her wings on her wedding night, suffered from censorship problems. Eddy sang "Spring Is Here" and the title song.

Nelson Eddy also starred in films with other leading ladies:

- Rosalie (1937), with Eleanor Powell, offered a score by Cole Porter. In his first solo-starring film, the script called for Eddy to portray a football-playing West Point pilot who pursues a princess-in-disguise to Europe. Eddy recorded the title song.
- Let Freedom Ring (1939), with Virginia Bruce, was a Western. Eddy got to beat up rugged Oscar winner Victor McLaglen and preserve freedom and the American way from bad guys, a popular theme just before World War II.
- Balalaika (1939), with Ilona Massey, was based on the 1936 English operetta by George Posford and Bernard Grün. Eddy is a prince in disguise, in love with a commoner during the Russian Revolution. The title song became one of his standards.
- The Chocolate Soldier (1941), with Metropolitan Opera star Risë Stevens, was a stylish musical adaptation of Ferenc Molnár's The Guardsman. Eddy played a dual role and turned in one of his best performances.
- Phantom of the Opera (1943) was Eddy's first film after he left MGM at the end of his seven-year contract. This lavish Technicolor musical also starred Claude Rains as the Phantom and Susanna Foster as Christine.
- Knickerbocker Holiday (1944) was based on the popular stage musical by Kurt Weill and Maxwell Anderson. It co-starred Charles Coburn (singing the classic "September Song") and Constance Dowling.
- Make Mine Music (1946) was a Walt Disney animated package film. Eddy provided all the singing and speaking voices for the touching final segment, "The Whale Who Wanted to Sing at the Met," later released as a short, Willie, the Operatic Whale, by Disney in 1954. Using a technique based on his technical experiments with his home recording equipment, Eddy was able to sing sextets with himself on the soundtrack, providing all the voices from bass to soprano.
- Northwest Outpost (1947) co-starred Ilona Massey. Rudolf Friml provided the songs for a story of Fort Ross, a Russian settlement in the Wild West of California. It was made at Republic Studios and turned out to be Eddy's final film.

After Eddy and MacDonald left MGM in 1942, several unrealized films remained that would have reunited the team. Eddy signed with Universal in 1943 for a two-picture deal. The first was Phantom of the Opera and the second would have co-starred MacDonald. She filmed her two scenes for Follow the Boys, then both stars severed ties with Universal. Eddy was upset with how Phantom of the Opera turned out.

Among their later other proposed projects were East Wind; Crescent Carnival, a book optioned by MacDonald; and The Rosary, the 1910 best-seller, which Eddy had read as a teen and pitched to MGM as a "comeback" film for MacDonald and himself in 1948. Other suggested projects included remakes of The Vagabond King (1930 film), The Desert Song (1929 film) and Mayerling (1936 film). Under the name "Isaac Ackerman" he wrote a biopic screenplay about Chaliapin, in which he was to play the lead and also a young Nelson Eddy, but it was never produced. He also wrote two movie treatments for MacDonald and himself, Timothy Waits for Love and All Stars Don't Spangle.

=== Recordings ===
Eddy made more than 290 recordings between 1935 and 1964, singing songs from his films, plus opera, folk songs, popular songs, Gilbert and Sullivan, and traditional arias from his concert repertoire. Since both MacDonald and he were under contract to RCA Victor between 1935 and 1938, this made it possible to include several popular duets from their films. In 1938, he signed with the Columbia Masterworks division of Columbia Records, which ended MacDonald-Eddy duets until Favorites in Stereo, a special LP album the two made together in 1959. He also recorded duets with his other screen partner, Risë Stevens (The Chocolate Soldier), and for albums with, among others, Nadine Conner, Doretta Morrow, Eleanor Steber, and Jo Stafford.

Eddy's recordings drew rave reviews during the 1930s and 1940s, and he continued to get good reviews into the 1960s. The Los Angeles Herald-Examiner on October 4, 1964, noted: "Nelson Eddy continues to roll along, physically and vocally indestructible. Proof is his newest recording on the Everest label, "Of Girls I Sing". At the age of 63 and after 42 years of professional singing, Eddy demonstrates not much change has occurred in his romantic and robust baritone, which made him America's most popular singer in the early '30s".

=== War work ===
Like many performers, Eddy was active during World War II, even before the United States entered the war. He did his first "war effort" concert on October 19, 1939, with Leopold Stokowski for Polish war relief. In 1942, he became an air raid warden and also put in long hours at the Hollywood Canteen. He broadcast for the armed forces throughout the war. In late 1943, he went on a two-month, 35,000-mile tour, giving concerts for military personnel in Belém and Natal, Brazil; Accra, Gold Coast; Aden; Asmara, Eritrea; Cairo (where he met King Farouk); Tehran; Casablanca; and the Azores. Because he spoke fluent German, having studied opera in Dresden during the 1920s, his work as an Allied spy was invaluable until his cover was blown with a near-fatal assignment in Cairo.

=== Radio and television ===
Eddy had his own show on CBS (1942–1943) and starred on The Electric Hour (1944-1946).

His version of the song "Rose Marie" was used as the subject of an episode of the Scottish comedy sitcom Still Game (S4E2), in which the song was requested by a dying patient.

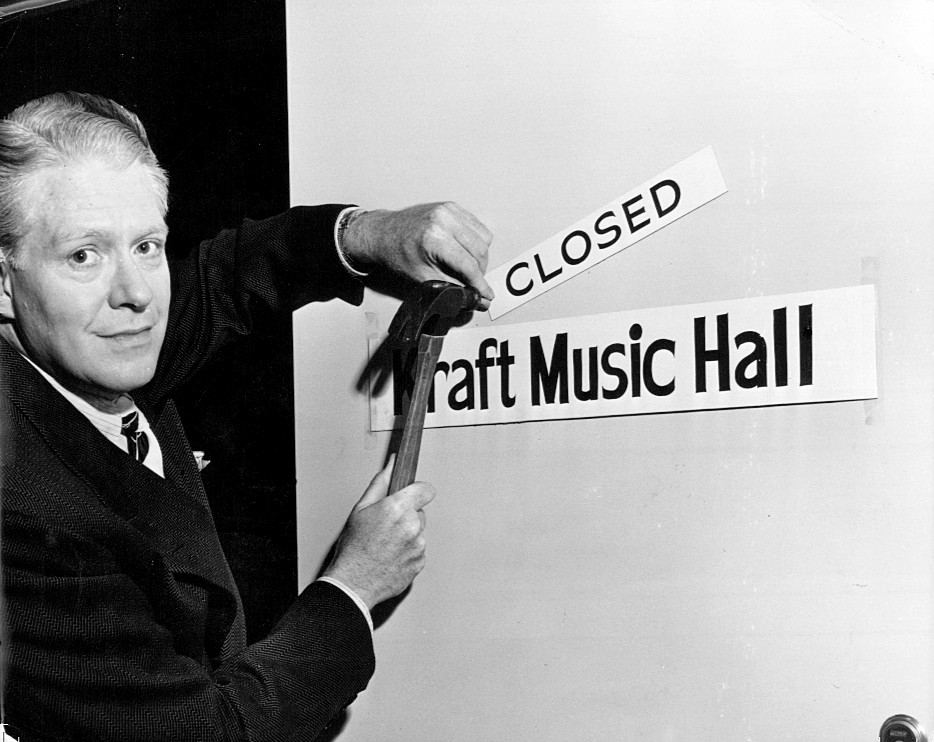
Nelson Eddy marks the end of the radio program Kraft Music Hall on September 22, 1949.

He began his more than 600 radio appearances in the mid-1920s. The first may have been on December 26, 1924, at station WOO in Philadelphia. Besides his many guest appearances, he hosted The Voice of Firestone (1936), The Chase and Sanborn Hour (1937–1939), and Kraft Music Hall (1947–1948), among other programs. Eddy frequently used his radio shows to advance the careers of promising young singers. While his programs often featured "serious" music, they were never straitlaced. It was in a series of comedy routines with Edgar Bergen and Charlie McCarthy on the Chase and Sanborn Hour that Eddy's name became associated with the song "Carry Me Back to Old Virginny", which was also included in the film Maytime. On March 31, 1933, he performed the role of Gurnemanz in a broadcast of Richard Wagner's opera Parsifal with Rose Bampton, conducted by Leopold Stokowski. During the 1940s, he was a frequent guest on Lux Radio Theater with Cecil B. DeMille, performing radio versions of Eddy's popular films. In 1951, Eddy guest-starred on several episodes of The Alan Young Show on CBS-TV. In 1952, he recorded a pilot for a sitcom, Nelson Eddy's Backyard, with Jan Clayton, but it failed to find a network slot. On November 12, 1952, he surprised his former co-star Jeanette MacDonald when she was the subject of Ralph Edwards' This Is Your Life. On November 30, 1952, Eddy was Ed Sullivan's guest on Toast of the Town.

During the next decade, he guest-starred on Danny Thomas's sitcom Make Room for Daddy and on variety programs such as The Ford Show, Starring Tennessee Ernie Ford, The Bob Hope Show, The Colgate Comedy Hour, The Spike Jones Show, The Dinah Shore Chevy Show. His television reunions with Jeanette MacDonald included Lux Video Theater and The Big Record (with Patti Page). Both appearances were highly successful but MacDonald's health was failing and although there was talk of their hosting a TV variety show together, it did not happen.

Eddy was a frequent guest on talk shows, including The Merv Griffin Show and The Tonight Show with Jack Paar. Parr asked him about the rumor of a MacDonald/Eddy feud and Eddy answered, "I love her. I think she loves me. I see her all the time." On May 7, 1955, Eddy starred in Max Liebman's 90-minute, live-TV version of Sigmund Romberg's The Desert Song on NBC-TV. It featured Gale Sherwood, Metropolitan Opera bass Salvatore Baccaloni and veteran film actor Otto Kruger.

=== Nightclub act ===
The advent of television reduced the profitability of the concert circuit, and in the early 1950s Eddy began considering future career options, eventually deciding to form a nightclub act. He said that this decision followed his appearance with MacDonald on This Is Your Life, which led to a personal reunion and discussion of the possibility of working together again. Both a nightclub act and an Australian tour were considered, but MacDonald withdrew for health reasons. Eddy premiered the act in January 1953 with singer Gale Sherwood, his partner, and Ted Paxson, his accompanist. Variety wrote, "Nelson Eddy, vet of films, concerts, and stage, required less than one minute to put a jam-packed audience in his hip pocket in one of the most explosive openings in this city's nightery history.... Before Eddy had even started to sing, they liked him personally as a warm human being". The act continued for the next 15 years and made four tours of Australia.

== Personal life ==
In his early career, Eddy dated Catherine Littlefield, Helen Jepson, and Rose Bampton, who said, "We were madly in love with him.... Helen was closer to Nelson than I. Let's just say Nelson liked me but he liked Helen more." He also had a lengthy affair and brief engagement to singer Maybelle Marston, which ended her marriage and cost her custody of her young son.

During his Hollywood years, Eddy dated a number of women, often after personal fallout with MacDonald. He proposed to writer May Mann in early 1937, following MacDonald's engagement to Gene Raymond; she declined because she wanted to continue her career. After MacDonald's marriage in June 1937, Eddy dated and proposed to screenwriter Frances Marion, who also declined. He had less serious romances with Elissa Landi, Eleanor Powell, Lina Basquette, Ilona Massey, Hedy Lamarr, and Anna May Wong, among others. According to women who dated him, he remained fixated on MacDonald and saw no real future with others. Laurrie Garner said, "That he had always loved her [Jeanette] he had told me from the start.... Nelson was a man who, once his heart was given, could not take it back, no matter what. And the grief and pain it caused him over the years I do know about at first hand." Eddy's preference for a traditional marriage, in which he would be the breadwinner and his wife would not place her career ahead of his, appears to have complicated his relationship with MacDonald, especially at the height of her career. Because he spent months each year on tour, he also wanted his wife at his side, and he wanted children. He later said, "My feelings about the subject of divorce amount to a sort of madness. I've watched the misery and agony that's come from the separation of man and wife. I know from private experience because of my parents."

Eddy married Ann Denitz Franklin, former wife of noted director Sidney Franklin, on January 19, 1939. Her son, Sidney Jr., became Eddy's stepson, but Nelson and she had no children of their own. They were married for 27 years, until Nelson's death. Ann Eddy died on August 28, 1987. She is buried next to Eddy and Eddy's mother in Hollywood Forever Cemetery. Eddy was a Republican.

=== Jeanette MacDonald ===
The most significant professional and personal relationship of Nelson Eddy's life was with Jeanette MacDonald, his co-star in eight films. Their 30-year relationship was largely hidden from the public. In a handwritten 1935 letter to "Dearest Jeanette", written on his letterhead, Eddy stated: "I love you and will always be devoted to you."

During filming of Rose Marie (1936), biographer Sharon Rich reports MacDonald had her first of eight pregnancies by Eddy—before any intimate relationship with Gene Raymond, who was physically unable to father children, as she alluded to in her unfinished autobiography: "The MacRaymonds had no children."

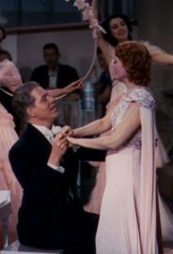
Jeanette MacDonald visibly pregnant with Nelson Eddy from the trailer for the film Sweethearts (1938)

Biographer E. J. Fleming alleged Eddy confronted Raymond for abusing the visibly pregnant MacDonald during Sweethearts (1938), ending with Eddy attacking him (reported publicly as a fall down stairs). Louis B. Mayer refused to allow annulment and elopement; MacDonald lost the baby (named Daniel Kendrick Eddy) at nearly six months, who Eddy buried in Ojai, California. All pregnancies ended in miscarriage.

Forbidden early on by Mayer to marry, they performed a handfast wedding at Lake Tahoe during Rose Marie. They considered themselves married "by God's law", renewing vows annually; MacDonald's 1948 desk diary notes "Lake Tahoe". MacDonald's autobiography includes several mentions of marital discord with Raymond, including a near-divorce in 1948.

Eddy nearly died of pneumonia in February 1946. In a semi-comatose state, he was "not expected to survive the night". A doctor summoned MacDonald so she could say her goodbyes. She sat by his bedside, holding his hand and speaking to him for two hours until he rallied. On March 26, Eddy wrote a lengthy diary entry to MacDonald about their first intimate night together after his recovery: "Never, my darling, have you been so completely my own as you were this night...never have you been so completely my wife—your arms, your lips—their magical effect on me – your whispered words—things you have never before said to me—how much I have missed you at night—how I want you always in my arms as I sleep...you and you alone are my existence." Several letters and diary entries show Eddy referring to MacDonald privately as 'my wife,' a term he continued to use until the end of her life.

In the 1930s–40s, they privately occupied several homes: a 1938 Burbank house at 812 S. Mariposa Street; a remodeled bunkhouse at 1330 Angelo Drive, Beverly Hills; and from 1947, 710 N. Camden Drive (formerly MacDonald's mother's home). They also stayed at hotels and celebrity friends' properties, including those of Lily Pons and Irene Dunne. In 1963, MacDonald and Raymond moved into adjoining 8th-floor apartments in the East building of the Wilshire Comstock in Westwood; Eddy had a 7th-floor unit in the adjacent West building—which she decorated as their rendezvous spot—until her final illness prevented her from walking the short distance outside to visit. (Eddy's widow Ann later moved into it after Eddy's death).

Biographer Sharon Rich—who was a close friend of Blossom Rock (MacDonald's sister, an early key source who provided pictures, information, and her phone book authorizing interviews) and knew Gene Raymond—documented their affair in the biography Sweethearts, which continued (with breaks) until MacDonald's death. Rock is heard speaking and answering a question in a 1977 recording despite her stroke.

In 2015, MacDonald's papers auctioned, including the 1935 Eddy letter and her 1963 diary aligning with Rich's Sweethearts on her health and marriage.

In 2025, a letter from her secretary Emily West was made public, detailing Eddy's deep distress at MacDonald's funeral; lingering at her open casket, he looked physically unwell and near collapse. "His grief was terrible to see. It was dreadful to see him like that. He looked so utterly stricken, he was overcome and said he couldn't stay.... After a little while, Nelson went back down alone to see her." Newsreel footage shows Eddy as the last guest exiting, consoled by celebrities like Lauritz Melchior.

== Death ==
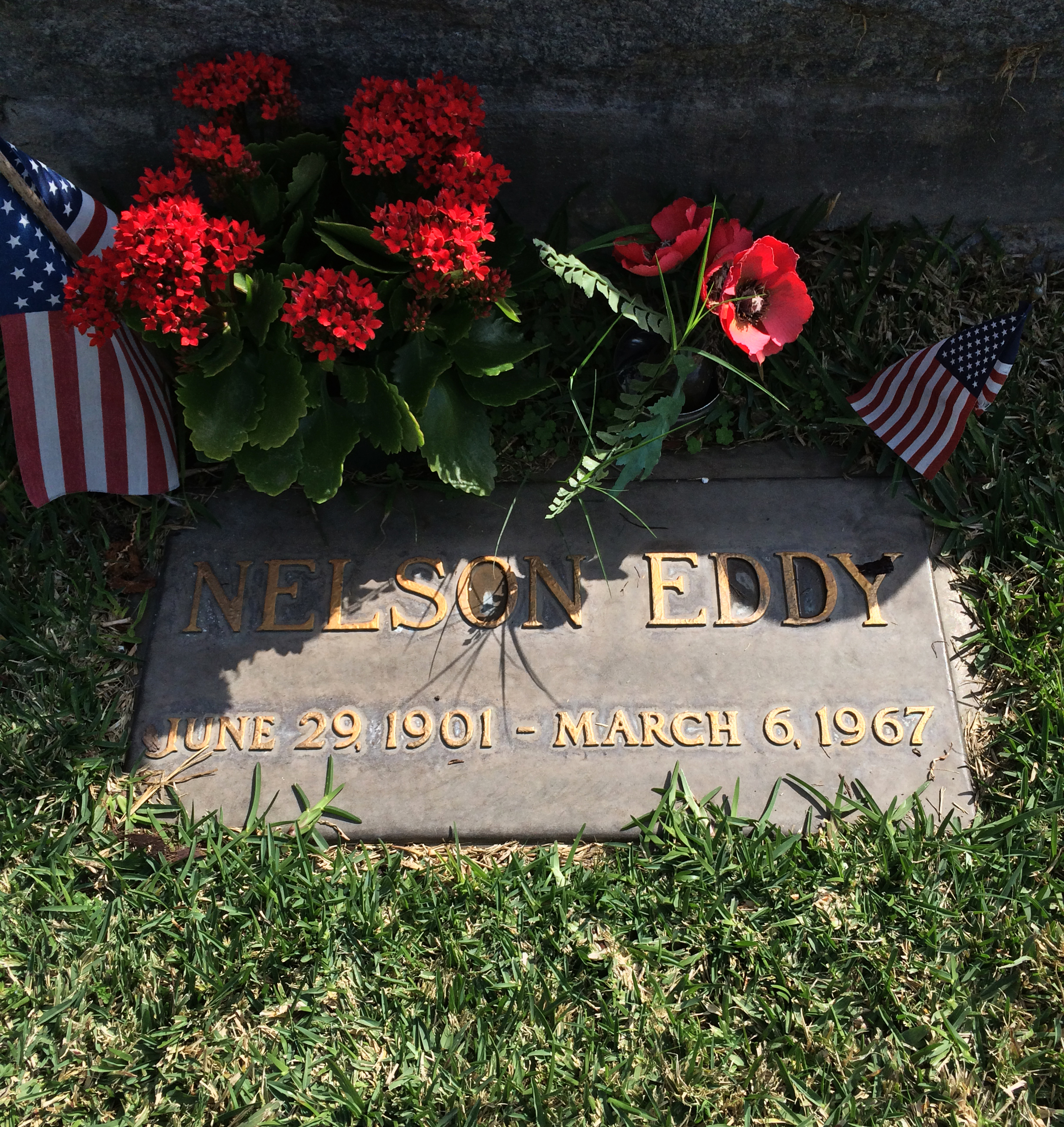
Grave of Nelson Eddy at Hollywood Forever

On March 5, 1967, Eddy was performing at the Sans Souci Hotel in Miami Beach, Florida, when he was stricken on stage with a cerebral hemorrhage. According to Gore Vidal, writing in Myra Breckinridge, he was singing "Dardanella" when he collapsed. Lillian Ranahan, who was sitting ringside, clarified: "Nelson was just about to sing solo when he seemed to have difficulty in talking. I thought he was dry and grabbed a glass of water to give to him, but was stopped by my friends at the table, saying he was all right. He looked so well and kept on talking and holding onto the left side of his face which I believe seemed to be getting numb. He said that he couldn't seem to get the words out and that this had not happened to him before and would we, the audience, bear with him. All this time he held onto the mike and was slowly walking towards the band. He asked if there was a doctor in the audience as he felt sick. He reached the band and asked his accompanist, Ted Paxson, who was seated at the piano, to play "Dardanella", saying maybe the words would come back to him." "Dardanella" was not a scheduled song for the program. Paxson jumped up and helped him from the stage; Eddy collapsed and never regained consciousness. His singing partner, Gale Sherwood, and his accompanist, Ted Paxson, were at his side. He died a few hours later in the early hours of March 6, 1967, at Mount Sinai Medical Center in Miami Beach, aged 65.

He is interred at Hollywood Forever Cemetery, between his mother and his widow (who outlived him by twenty years).

== Papers ==
Eddy's meticulously annotated scores (some with his caricatures sketched in the margins) are now housed at Occidental College Special Collections in Los Angeles. His personal papers and scrapbooks are at the University of Southern California Cinema/Television Library, also in Los Angeles.

== Discography ==
- Hymns We Love (1946, Columbia)
- Nelson Eddy in songs of Stephen Foster (1949 Columbia)
- Songs for Christmas (1951, Columbia)
- Nelson Eddy in Oklahoma! (1956, Columbia)
- The Desert Song (1956, Columbia)
- Nelson Eddy Favorites (1959, Columbia)
- Jeanette MacDonald & Nelson Eddy - Favorites in Stereo (1959, RCA Victor Living Stereo LSP-1738)
- A Starry Night (1960, Everest)
- Of Girls I Sing (1965, Everest LPBR 9006)
- Operetta Cameos (with Jeanette MacDonald) (1982, RCA Records Red Seal R263428 (e))
- The Artistry of Nelson Eddy (1994); CD 2009, Essential Media)
- Smilin' Through (2000, Memoir)
- As Years Go By (2013, Jasmine)
- Songs We Love (1950, Columbia Masterworks, A-965)
- A Perfect Day (Original 1935-1947 Recordings) (2002, Nostalgia Naxos, 8.120591)

== Sources ==
- Barclay, Florence L., The Rosary (with new introduction by Sharon Rich and comments by Jeanette MacDonald and Nelson Eddy), Bell Harbour Press, 2005. This 1910 #1 best seller featured two singers in a "Jane Eyre" plot, and the heroine's nickname was, in fact, Jeanette. Eddy chose it as a possible film vehicle for himself and MacDonald in 1948. This edition features a new introduction with excerpts from their written correspondence of that year, in which the film project was discussed.
- Eddy, Nelson, "All Stars Don't Spangle" treatment for himself and MacDonald reprinted in its entirety in Mac/Eddy Today magazine, issue #50.
- Kiner, Larry, Nelson Eddy: A Bio-Discography, Scarecrow Press, Metuchen, New Jersey, 1992. A near-complete list of every recording and radio show of Eddy's, including song titles, photos and other important facts.
- Knowles (Dugan), Eleanor, The Films of Jeanette MacDonald and Nelson Eddy, Booksurge LLC, 2006. 646 pages, 591 photos. Contains detailed film credits, plots, and backgrounds for the two stars' 41 films, also complete music lists for each film, biographies of the two stars, and a complete discography.
- Rich, Sharon, Sweethearts: The Timeless Love Affair Onscreen and Off Between Jeanette MacDonald and Nelson Eddy, Updated 20th Anniversary Edition, Bell Harbour Press, 2014. 612 pages, about 100 photos, over 50 pages of documentation. A candid biography in which Eddy's graphic love letters to MacDonald are startling, but their relationship is meticulously documented at times on a near-daily basis. Using eyewitness accounts from contemporary letters, this biography provides needed insight into why Eddy made certain professional decisions in the 1940s and 1950s.
- Rich, Sharon, Nelson Eddy: The Opera Years, Bell Harbour Press, 2001. A very comprehensive overview of Eddy's early career. This photo-filled book includes compilations of virtually every review written about him from 1922 until 1935, clippings from his personal scrapbooks with his handwritten notations, all early interviews, many rare photographs and all his operas (including some tenor and bass roles). A bonus chapter includes MacDonald's opera career (1943–45) and their operatic scenes together in the lost "Tosca" Act II from the movie Maytime. There are also excerpts from an unproduced movie script written by Nelson on the life of Feodor Chaliapin, in which he had planned to play dual roles—Chaliapin and himself.
- Rich, Sharon (2004). Jeanette MacDonald Autobiography: The Lost Manuscript. Bell Harbour Press. ISBN 0-9711998-8-4. The complete, typewritten autobiography with MacDonald's handwritten editing, deletions and comments noted throughout. Annotated and with original letters from MacDonald's collaborator on the project.
- Lillo, Antonio. 2000. "Bees, Nelsons, and Sterling Denominations: A Brief Look at Cockney Slang and Coinage". Journal of English Linguistics 28 (2): pp. 145–172.
- McCormick, Maggie (2019). I'll See You Again: The Bittersweet Love Story and Wartime Letters of Jeanette MacDonald and Gene Raymond, Volume 1: The War - and Before. BearManor Media. ISBN 978-1-62933-436-3.
- McCormick, Maggie (2019). I'll See You Again: The Bittersweet Love Story and Wartime Letters of Jeanette MacDonald and Gene Raymond, Volume 2: The Letters. BearManor Media. ISBN 978-1-62933-448-6.
- McCormick, Maggie (2019). I'll See You Again: The Bittersweet Love Story and Wartime Letters of Jeanette MacDonald and Gene Raymond, Volume 3: After the War. BearManor Media. ISBN 978-1-62933-450-9.
