= Summer Song (musical) =

1956 musical

Summer Song is a 1956 musical based on the visit of the Czech composer Antonin Dvorak to Iowa, where he wrote his symphony From the New World. The lyrics were written by Eric Maschwitz and book by Hy Kraft to music by Dvorak, arranged by Bernard Grun. Maschwitz had already worked with Grun on the Chopin musical Waltz Without End in 1942.

Summer Song opened in London in 1956 at the Prince's Theatre and ran for 148 performances.

== Original cast recording ==
1. "Overture" – Orchestra
2. "Just Around The Corner" –Sally Ann Howes
3. "My Darling Karolka" – Sally Ann Howes
4. "Once A Year Is Not Enough" – Bonita Primrose
5. "Be She Dark, Be She Fair" – David Hughes
6. "Cotton Tail" – Edric Connor
7. "No-One Told Me" – David Hughes
8. "Sing Me A Song" – chorus
9. "Murphy's Pig" – Bonita Primrose
10. "Saturday Girl" – David Hughes, Sally Ann Howes
11. "One Boy Sends You A Rose" – Sally Ann Howes, Bonita Primrose
12. "Dvorak's Letter Home" – Laurence Naismith
13. "Deep Blue Evening" – Edric Connor
14. "The Day You Hit The Highway" – Edric Connor
15. "Weddin' Gown" – Van Atkins, Bonita Primrose
16. "Summer Song" – Sally Ann Howes
17. "Small Town Sweetheart" – David Hughes
18. "New York '93" – chorus
19. "I'll Be Remembering" – Sally Ann Howes
20. "Finale" – David Hughes, Sally Ann Howes
