= Waltz Time =

Waltz Time may refer to:

- Waltz Time (1933 film), a British musical film
- Waltz Time (1945 film), a British musical film
