= Starc =

Starc is a surname. Notable people with the surname include:

- Brandon Starc (born 1993), Australian high jumper
- Mitchell Starc (born 1990), Australian cricketer, brother of Brandon

== See also ==
- STARC, abbreviation of State Area Command, mobilization entity of the National Guard of the United States in each state and territory
- Stařeč, town in the Czech Republic
- Alyssa Healy (born 1990), Australian cricketer, wife of Mitchell Starc
