= George Posford =

English composer (1906–1976)

- Born: Benjamin George Ashwell; 23 March 1906; Folkestone, Kent, England
- Died: 24 April 1976 (aged 70)
- Occupation: Composer

George Posford, born Benjamin George Ashwell (23 March 1906 – 24 April 1976), was an English composer and conductor.

== Early life ==
Benjamin George Ashwell was born in 1906 in Folkestone, Kent. He was educated at Downside School in Somerset and Christ's College at Cambridge University. He studied law, but would become known for his musical achievements, after a song he co-wrote with Rodney Hobson was successfully interpolated in an early 1930s touring version of the show Lavender, which pointed him towards a new career. After Cambridge, Ashwell studied composition and orchestration at the Royal College of Music in London.

== Career ==
Ashwell became a professional composer in 1930, and would be known as George Posford. He initially specialised in BBC Radio work, before moving into theatre. He composed many songs, often with librettist-lyricist Eric Maschwitz. For radio, they wrote Goodnight Vienna, which then became a 1932 film (the first British musical to be filmed), starring Anna Neagle and Jack Buchanan (known in the US as Magic Night), and a stage show. Posford and Maschwitz then wrote The Great Hussar (1933), which, revised and with additional music by Bernard Grun, opened at London's Adelphi Theatre as Balalaika (1936), where it ran for 570 performances. The hit song, hastily written by Posford and Maschwitz, was "At The Balalaika". The 1939 film version starred Nelson Eddy and Ilona Massey. Some of Posford's melodies and themes appeared in the films The Good Companions and Britannia of Billingsgate (both 1933), and Invitation to the Waltz (1935). Posford also composed for the concert platform: these works included Transatlantic Rhapsody (commissioned by the BBC for the maiden voyage of the Queen Mary ocean liner in 1936) and Broadcasting House.

Maschwitz, Posford and Grun also composed Paprika (1938), which flopped, but a revised version, Magyar Melody, ran at His Majesty's Theatre for 105 performances. To the original score was added "Mine Alone", composed by Manning Sherwin, which outlived the show.

Posford and Harry Parr-Davies composed Full Swing (1940), starring Cicely Courtneidge and Jack Hulbert, which had 468 performances during the London blitz. Posford wrote a number of wartime revues for the duo. During World War II, he was in the Royal Corps of Signals and the London Fire Service. He was subsequently involved in the Overseas Recorded Broadcasting Service.

After the war, Posford co-composed Evangeline (1946) with Harry Jacobson. Starring Frances Day, this was a reworking by Maschwitz of James Laver's Nymph Errant. In 1951, Posford was again in collaboration with Maschwitz, writing Zip Goes a Million. Starring George Formby, the show ran for 544 performances at the Palace Theatre, and the songs included the title song, "Ridin' Into Town", "The Thing About You", "It Takes No Time To Fall In Love", "Nothing Breaks But The Heart", "I Owe You", "Big Business", "Trouble With My Heart", "Thou Art For Me", "Ordinary People" and "I'm Saving Up For Sally". Posford and Maschwitz also collaborated on Happy Holiday (1954), a musical version of Arnold Ridley's The Ghost Train. Among the songs from this show was "Sew A Silver Button On the Moon". Staged over Christmas, the show was unsuccessful.

== Personal life and death ==
Posford married actress Rène Ray in August 1936. He died on 24 April 1976 in Worplesdon, Surrey, aged 70 and was interred in the churchyard of St Edward The Confessor in Sutton Green. He had a house built for him in Rustington, West Sussex, called Sark House, where Noël Coward was a regular guest.

== Tributes ==
An album of his works, Room Five-Hundred-and-Four: The Music of George Posford (named after his song of the same name) was recorded by Frank Barber and released by EMI Columbia in 1960.

== Works ==
Musical theatre

- Goodnight, Vienna (1931)
- Balalaika (1936); co-composed with Bernard Grün
- Evangeline (1946 musical) (1946); music also by Harry Jacobson
- Her Excellency (1949); co-composed with Manning Sherwin
- Zip Goes a Million (1951)
- Happy Holiday (1954)

Film scores

- Goodnight, Vienna (1932)
- The Good Companions (1933)
- Balalaika (1939)
- Magyar Melody (1939)
- Full Swing (1942)

Orchestra

- Transatlantic Rhapsody (1942)
