= Jeanette MacDonald and Nelson Eddy =

Popular screen couple in the 1930s and '40s

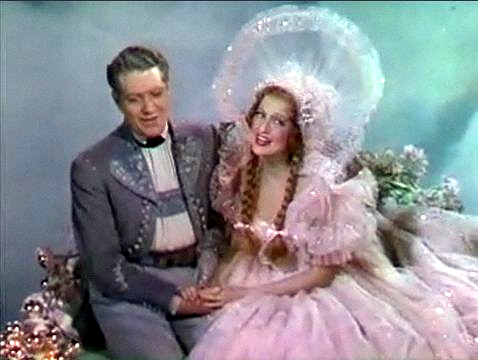
Eddy and MacDonald from the trailer for Sweethearts (1938)

Jeanette MacDonald (1903–1965) and Nelson Eddy (1901–1967) were a popular screen couple in the 1930s and '40s, specializing in musicals. They starred in eight films together, all for Metro-Goldwyn-Mayer. Eddy was an opera singer before he became a film star, while MacDonald turned to opera later in her career. Their best-known onscreen duet is "Indian Love Call", from Rose Marie.

== Filmography ==
Films starring Jeanette MacDonald and Nelson Eddy
| Year | Title | Roles | | Notes | Budget | Box office | Ref |
| Year | Title | MacDonald | Eddy | Notes | Budget | Box office | Ref |
|---|---|---|---|---|---|---|---|
| 1935 | Naughty Marietta | Princess Marie de Namours de Bonfain | Capt. Richard Warrington | | $782,000 | $2,057,000 | |
| 1936 | Rose Marie | Marie de Flor (Rose Marie) | Sgt. Bruce | | $875,000 | $3,515,000 | |
| 1937 | Maytime | Marcia Morney / Miss Morison | Paul Allison | Released with tinted sequences | $2,126,000 | $4,006,000 | |
| 1938 | The Girl of the Golden West | Mary Robbins | Ramerez / Lt. Dick Johnson | Released in sepiatone | $1,680,000 | $2,882,000 | |
| 1938 | Sweethearts | Gwen Marlowe | Ernest Lane | Filmed in Technicolor | $1,900,000 | $3,200,000 | |
| 1940 | New Moon | Marianne de Beaumanoir | Charles Mission, Duc de Vidiers | | $1,487,000 | $2,527,000 | |
| 1940 | Bitter Sweet | Sarah Mallick / "Sari" | Carl Linden | Filmed in Technicolor | $1,100,000 | $2,200,000 | |
| 1942 | I Married an Angel | Anna Zador / Brigitta, an angel | Count Willi Palaffi | | $1,492,000 | $1,236,000 | |
| Total | | | | | $11,442,000 | $21,623,000 | |
