= Sharon Rich =

American writer

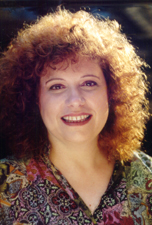
- Sharon Rich book jacket photo
- Born: June 11, 1953 (age 73); Los Angeles, California
- Occupation: Author
- Website: www.sharonrich.com

Sharon Rich (born June 11, 1953) is an American author and film historian, best known for the biography Sweethearts about 1930s singing stars Jeanette MacDonald and Nelson Eddy.

== Career ==
She was close friends for many years with Jeanette MacDonald's older sister, actress Blossom Rock (aka Marie Blake). Along with interviewing hundreds of people, Rich had access to many collections of private letters, Eddy's personal scrapbooks, diary entries, FBI files and MacDonald's unpublished autobiography (which Rich later annotated in 2004). As follow up documentation to Sweethearts, Rich has written several books and edited and written over seventy magazine articles.

She is president of the largest Jeanette MacDonald/Nelson Eddy fan club in the United States, the MacDonald/Eddy Friendship Club, which she helped create in the late 70s. Rich was made a Dame of Malta in 1995 for her contribution to history and literature. Also in 1995, she went to Washington, D.C., to petition to have MacDonald and Eddy's likeness placed on postage stamps. She was accompanied by around 20 fans and had collected 20,000 signatures for the campaign.

== Works ==
Rich's first book, Jeanette MacDonald: A Pictorial History (1974) was published when she was twenty years old. Rich wanted to write the book because she felt that there were "very few idols" left in the world.

Sweethearts was published in hardcover in 1994 and was a selection of the Entertainment Book Club. The book release party was held at the American Film Institute in Washington, D.C., where Rich was a guest speaker. Rich spent twenty years researching the book. The book was revised and updated in 2014.

== Books ==
- Sweethearts: The Timeless Love Affair Onscreen and Off Between Jeanette MacDonald and Nelson Eddy, updated 20th anniversary edition (2014)
- The Rosary by Florence L. Barclay, new introduction by Sharon Rich, comments by MacDonald and Eddy (2005)
- Jeanette MacDonald Autobiography: The Lost Manuscript (2004)
- Jeanette MacDonald: The Irving Stone Letters (2002)
- Nelson Eddy: The Opera Years (2001)
- Jeanette MacDonald and Nelson Eddy: Interactive CD-ROM Biography (2000)
- Sweethearts: The Timeless Love Affair Onscreen and Off Between Jeanette MacDonald and Nelson Eddy (1994)
- Farewell to Dreams (co-author) (1978)
- Jeanette MacDonald: A Pictorial Treasury (1973)

== Magazines ==
- Mac/Eddy Today, editor and writer, 76 issues published as of 2017.
