= Gina Malo =

American actress (1909–1963)

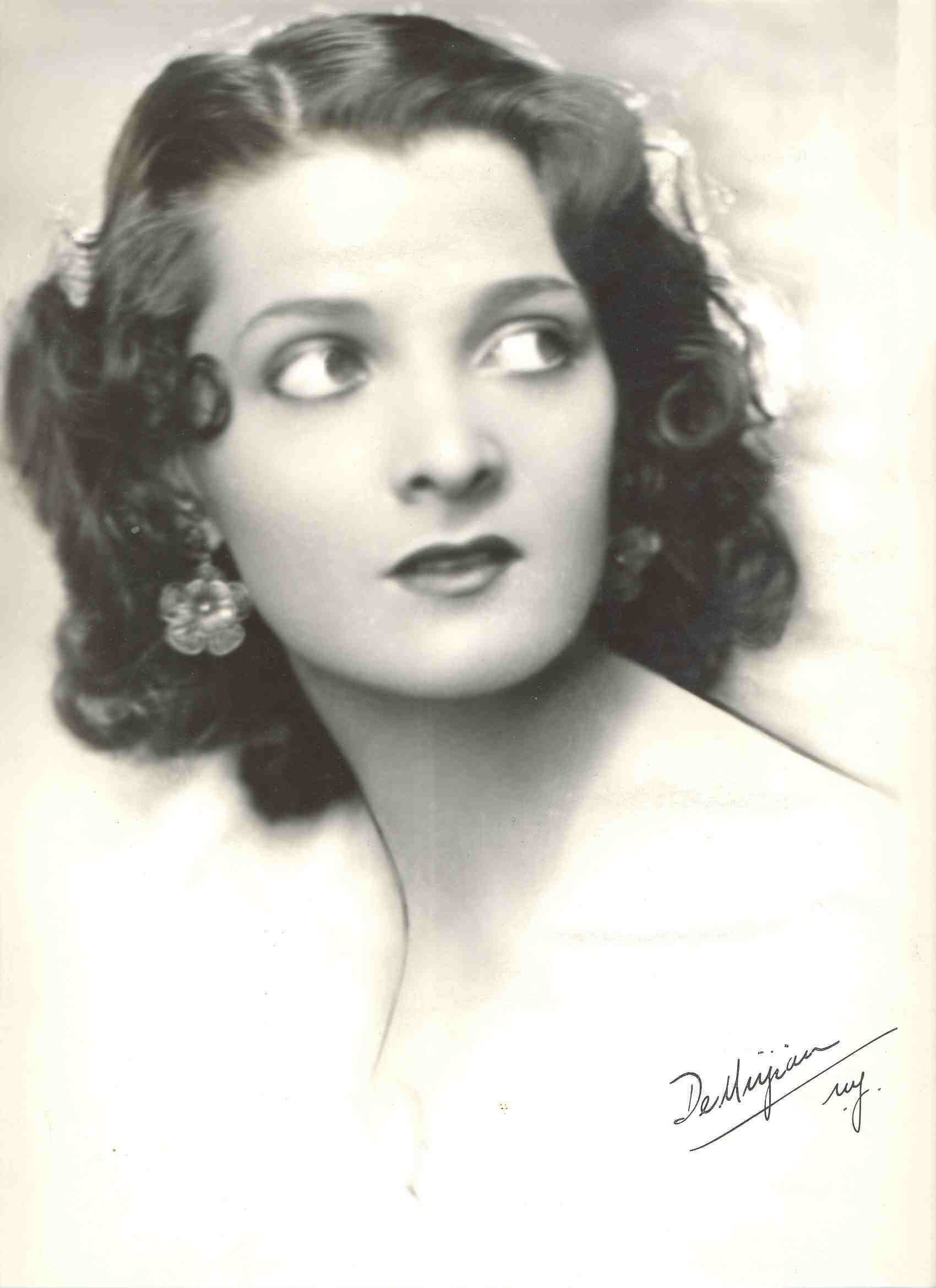
- Born: Janet Flynn; June 1, 1909; Cincinnati, Ohio, U.S.
- Died: November 30, 1963 (aged 54); New York City, U.S.
- Occupation: Actress
- Years active: 1932–1940
- Spouse: Romney Brent (m. 1937)
- Children: 1

Gina Malo (born Janet Flynn; June 1, 1909 – November 30, 1963) was an American film actress, born Janet Flynn in Cincinnati, Ohio. She appeared in a number of British films in the 1930s, often playing an American.

== Early career ==
Though born in Cincinnati as Janet Flynn, Gina Malo represented herself as a Parisian film actress when securing her first Broadway parts. After a stint with Florenz Ziegfeld as a showgirl, Malo's ambitions as a singer found vent when she secured the part of the prima donna in Sigmund Romberg's operetta The New Moon (1928-1929). When a Paris production of Romberg's musical formed, she jumped at the chance to play the part again.

A capable French speaker, she obtained another stage role in Paris singing in Broadway. She returned to New York as a replacement for Lili Damita in "Sons o’Guns". Rumors of her American nativity were not laid to rest by her speaking in a heavy French accent to interviewers, but her singing, markedly superior to Damita's, won praise in 1930. After Ruby Keeler bailed out of 'The Gang's All Here' during its Philadelphia tryout in 1931, Malo took over as the singing lead. Keeler may have intuited something, for the show was being hijacked by Ted Healy, not a place for an ambitious leading lady to be. The musical died after 23 performances.

== Britain ==
Assuaging her wounds by crossing the Atlantic, she appeared in the London production of Victoria and her Hussar. She remained in London for the production of Jerome Kern's The Cat and the Fiddle, a smash hit with Peggy Wood in the lead. When the British-Gaumont company decided to adapt Johann Strauss's Fledermaus to the screen, they tapped Malo to play Adele, the singing maid. Waltz Time was a success in England and the United States.

Firmly established in the British entertainment world, Malo next starred in The Bride of the Lake (also known as Lily of Killarney), a nostalgic, tuneful rendering of Dion Boucicault's old Irish melodrama, The Colleen Bawn. After testing unsuccessfully for the role of Anna Held in The Great Ziegfeld in Hollywood, Malo returned to London to play in the French importation, Toi C’est Moi, followed in Spring 1935 with a turn in the musical Leave it to Love. She also appeared on screen in a Jan Kiepura vehicle, My Song for You.

Malo in the late 1930s was a fixture of the English stage, playing in a succession of hits: The Gang Show, On Your Toes, Diversion and The Gentle People. Her film career remained lively, with highlights such as The Private Life of Don Juan, Windbag the Sailor, Where There's a Will and the screen version of the stage hit The Gang Show.

In 1937, she married actor and dramatist Romney Brent.

== Later career ==
In March 1940, the couple left London for New York as war loomed. She could only secure a role in a B-level scare flick, Chamber of Horrors. She played in American regional summer theater through World War II. Malo eventually found her way to Toronto and won praise there for her work in repertory work, such as the 1944 production of Hamlet. After the war, she toured in Brent's production of Merry Wives of Windsor.

== Notes ==
J. Brooks Atkinson, 'Songs, Dances and Stooges,' NYT 2-19-1931, 28. NYT 1-19-1932, 13. Los Angeles Times 2-22,1934, 7. NYT 2-10-1935. Los Angeles Times 712–1935, A:11. NYT 3-19-1940, 34. Obituary NYT 12-3-1963, 43. Internet Broadway Database. Internet Movie Database. David S. Shields.

== Filmography ==
Year	Title	Role	Notes
1932	In a Monastery Garden	Nina	
1932	Goodnight, Vienna	Frieda	
1932	A Tight Corner		
1933	King of the Ritz	Victoria	
1933	Waltz Time	Adele	
1933	Strike It Rich	Mary	
1934	Lily of Killarney	Eileen O'Connor	
1934	My Song for You	Kleeberg's Brunet	
1934	The Private Life of Don Juan	Pepita, Another Dancer of Equal Temperament	
1936	Where There's a Will	Goldie Kelly	
1936	Southern Roses	Mary Rowland	
1936	All In	Kay Slott	
1936	Jack of All Trades	Frances Wilson	
1937	Over She Goes	Dolly Jordan	
1937	It's a Grand Old World	Joan	
1938	His Lordship Regrets	Mabel van Morgan	
1938	The Gang Show	Marie	
1940	The Door with Seven Locks	Glenda Baker	(final film role)
