= Edouard Lippé =

American composer and singer (1884-1956)

Edouard Lippé (May 24, 1884 in Pennsylvania – 1956), also frequently spelled Eduardo Lippe, was an American composer, baritone, and singing teacher.

== Biography ==
He is best known for having been Nelson Eddy's first and principal teacher, apparently even financing his pupil's finishing studies in Paris and Dresden. Lippé followed Eddy to Hollywood, where he appeared in the small role of the Landlord in the 1935 film version of Victor Herbert's Naughty Marietta. He was also the singing teacher of Todd Duncan, George Gershwin's personal choice for Porgy at the world première of Porgy and Bess, and one of the first African-American opera singers of renown. Lippe also gave lessons to another lesser-known but gifted young singer by the name of Victor Marchese who went on to record with MGM records. Lippé wrote many songs, including a particularly graceful setting of Elizabeth Barrett Browning's How Do I Love Thee? included by Arleen Auger in a 1986 recital of love songs.
