= The Gang Show =

- Feature on the film from Picture Show (16 October 1937)
- Directed by: Alfred J. Goulding
- Written by: Marjorie Gaffney (scenario); Ralph Reader
- Produced by: Herbert Wilcox
- Starring: Ralph Reader; Gina Malo; Stuart Robinson
- Cinematography: Ernest Palmer
- Edited by: Peggy Hennessy
- Music by: Gerald Walcan-Bright and Ralph Reader
- Distributed by: General Film Distributors (UK), Syndicate Pictures (USA).
- Release date: April 1937
- Running time: 96 minutes
- Country: United Kingdom
- Language: English

The Gang Show (U.S. title: The Gang ) is a 1937 British musical film directed by Alfred J. Goulding and starring Ralph Reader, Gina Malo and Stuart Robinson. It was written by Marjorie Gaffney and Reader, and filmed at Pinewood Studios.

The film utilises material and cast from Reader's Gang Shows on the London stage and includes the Gang Show anthem; "Crest of a Wave".

== Plot ==
Scout leader and company clerk Ted James, known as "Skipper", wants to be on the stage. Having failed to interest agents in his own talents, he decides to produce an all-Scout variety show, aided by Marie. The show is a big success, produces funds for a new Scout hall, and romance between Skipper and Marie.

== Cast ==
- Ralph Reader as Skipper
- Gina Malo as Marie
- Stuart Robinson as Raydon
- Richard Ainley as Whipple
- Leonard Snelling as Len
- Syd Palmer as Syd
- Roy Emerton as the proprietor
- Percy Walsh as McCulloch

== Release ==
The film premiered at the Lyceum Theatre, London on 13 April 1937.

It was released in New York in December 1938.

== Reception ==
The Monthly Film Bulletin wrote: "Ralph Reader, who gives an outstanding performance, and Gina Malo provide romance and, for further relief, there is an effectively poignant episode of a boy king who wants to go fishing. The humours of female impersonation and of amateur theatricals are well handled and the mass choruses go with a swing. One of the songs is distinctly coarse."

Kine Weekly wrote: "Comedy extravaganza with music woven around the Scout Revue, presented year after year at the Scala Theatre for the benefit of Scout funds. Basically the tilm is nothing more than the old Army 'Splinters' show in juvenile guise; it has only its enthusiastic naivete to compensate for its amateurish conception and presentation. Its artless humour and amiable ragging may, however, entertain industrial audiences and youngsters, but it will need all the support that Scout organisations can give it."

The Daily Film Renter wrote: "Rollicking entertainment exploiting Boy Scout 'Gang' of Albert Hall and Scala Theatre fame. Deftly devised story depicts ambitious young clerk making good as show producer by putting on novel performance enacted by talented lads in theatre left vacant by defaulting opera company. Highlight is 'Gang Show,' breezily presented, with song, comedy, dance, and ballet burlesque potpourri that cannot fail to hit popular target."

Picture Show wrote: "'This is a most enthralling production, unusual and heartily entertaining."

Variety wrote: "This is the type of British production that fully absolves American exhibitors from not wanting English pictures. ... most of it is ill-conceived and inanely executed."
