= Balalaika (musical) =

Musical play by Eric Maschwitz, George Posford and Bernard Grun

Balalaika is a musical play in three acts with book and lyrics by Eric Maschwitz, music by George Posford and Bernard Grun. It opened in London at the Adelphi Theatre on 22 December 1936, starring Muriel Angelus, Roger Treville, Clifford Mollison and Betty Warren, and ran for 569 performances.

A love story between a young nobleman and a ballerina set mostly in Russia during World War I and the Russian Revolution, it begins and ends in 1924 at a Montmartre night-club called the "Balalaika", telling the lovers' story through a series of flashbacks.

Itself a revised version of an earlier London musical play called The Great Hussar, which opened at the Adelphi Theatre on 19 October 1933, Balalaika formed the basis for the 1939 MGM movie of the same name starring Nelson Eddy and Ilona Massey.
