= Waltz Time (1933 film) =

- Directed by: Wilhelm Thiele
- Written by: A.P. Herbert; Louis Levy; Richard Genée (libretto Die Fledermaus); Karl Haffner (libretto Die Fledermaus); Henri Meilhac (play Le Réveillon); Ludovic Halévy (play Le Réveillon)
- Produced by: Hermann Fellner; Tom Arnold
- Starring: Evelyn Laye; Fritz Schulz; Gina Malo
- Edited by: Derek Twist
- Music by: Johann Strauss; Louis Levy
- Production company: Gaumont British Picture Corporation
- Distributed by: Woolf and Freedman
- Release date: June 1933
- Running time: 82 minutes
- Country: United Kingdom
- Language: English

Waltz Time is a 1933 British musical film directed by Wilhelm Thiele and starring Evelyn Laye, Fritz Schulz and Gina Malo. It is an adaptation of the operetta Die Fledermaus by Johann Strauss II and Richard Genée.

It was made at the Lime Grove Studios. The film's sets were designed by Alfred Junge.

== Cast ==
- Evelyn Laye as Rosalinde Eisenstein
- Fritz Schulz as Fritz Eisenstein
- Gina Malo as Adele
- Jay Laurier as Frosch
- Parry Jones as Alfred
- George Baker as Orlovsky
- Frank Titterton as Fiacre Driver
- Ivor Barnard as Falke
- D. A. Clarke-Smith as Meyer
- Edmund Breon as Judge Bauer

== Bibliography ==
- Wood, Linda. British Films, 1927-1939. British Film Institute, 1986.
