= Stařeč =

- Market town
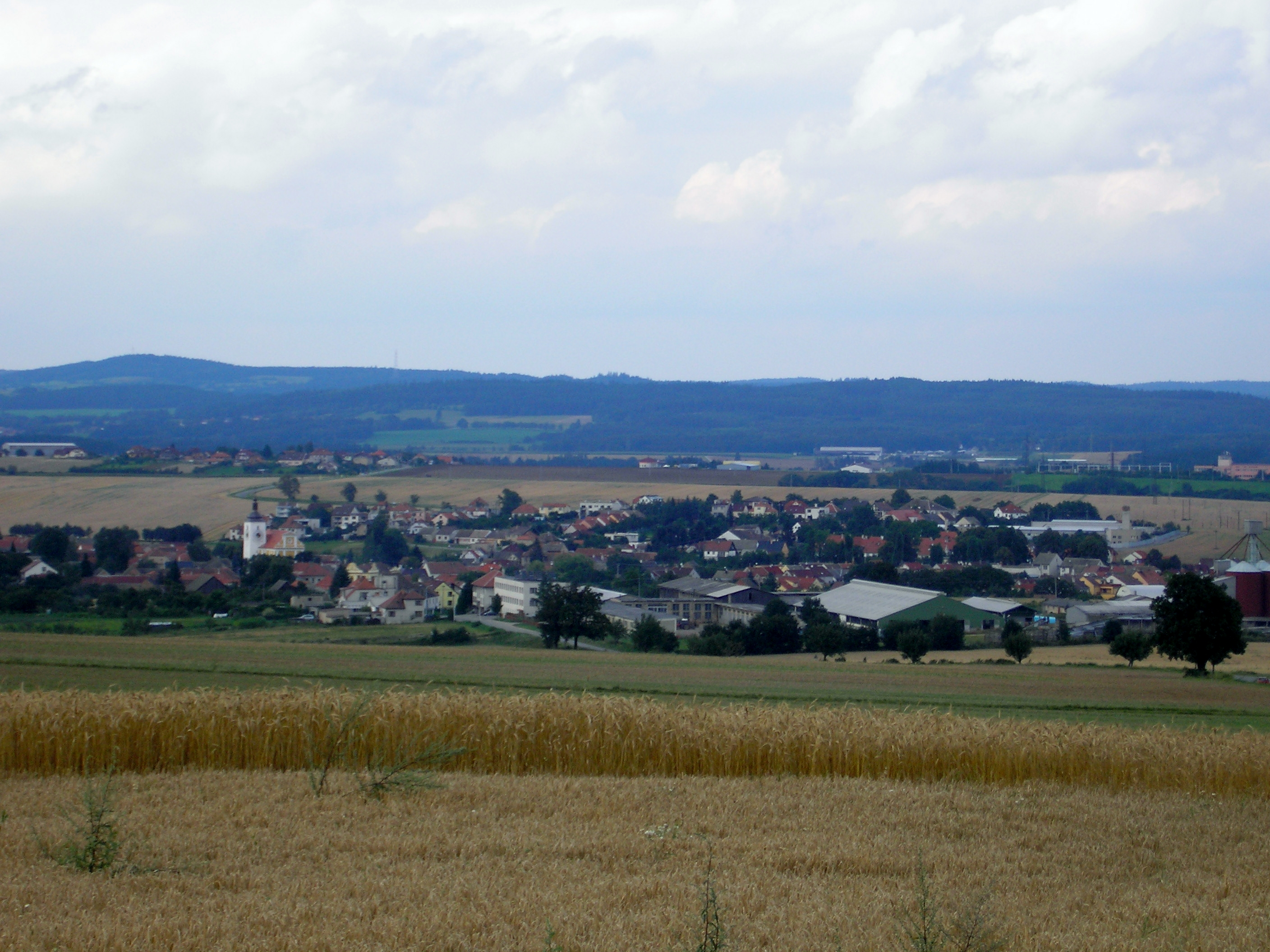
- View from the south

- Flag Coat of arms

- Location in the Czech Republic
- Coordinates: 49°11′52″N 15°49′41″E
- Country: Czech Republic
- Region: Vysočina
- District: Třebíč
- First mentioned: 1259

Area
  - Total: 15.41 km^{2} (5.95 sq mi)
- Elevation: 455 m (1,493 ft)

Population (2026-01-01)
  - Total: 1,713
  - Density: 111.2/km^{2} (287.9/sq mi)
- Time zone: UTC+1 (CET)
  - Summer (DST): UTC+2 (CEST)
- Postal code: 675 22
- Website: www.mestys-starec.eu

Stařeč (Czech pronunciation: [ˈstar̝ɛtʃ]; German: Startsch) is a market town in Třebíč District in the Vysočina Region of the Czech Republic. It has about 1,700 inhabitants.

== Administrative division ==
Stařeč consists of two municipal parts (in brackets population according to the 2021 census):

- Stařeč (1,508)
- Kracovice (81)

== Geography ==
Stařeč is located about 3 kilometres (2 mi) southwest of Třebíč and 27 km (17 mi) southeast of Jihlava. It lies in the Jevišovice Uplands. The highest point is the hill Zadní hora at 634 m (2,080 ft) above sea level. The stream Stařečský potok flows through the market town.

== History ==
The first written mention of Stařeč is from 1259, but the village may have already appeared in the foundation deed of Třebíč Monastery from 1101. In 1499, Stařeč was first mentioned as a market town. In 1534, it was promoted to market town again, so it probably lost this status briefly during the 1499–1534 period.

== Demographics ==
Historical population

Year	Pop.	±%
1869	906	—
1880	1,032	+13.9%
1890	1,081	+4.7%
1900	1,232	+14.0%
1910	1,381	+12.1%

Year	Pop.	±%
1921	1,316	−4.7%
1930	1,455	+10.6%
1950	1,450	−0.3%
1961	1,528	+5.4%
1970	1,495	−2.2%

Year	Pop.	±%
1980	1,417	−5.2%
1991	1,354	−4.4%
2001	1,427	+5.4%
2011	1,630	+14.2%
2021	1,589	−2.5%

Source: Censuses

== Transport ==
The I/23 road (the section from Třebíč to Jindřichův Hradec) runs through the northern part of the municipal territory. The II/410 road from Třebíč to Jemnice runs through the market town proper.

Stařeč is located on the railway line Znojmo–Okříšky.

== Sights ==
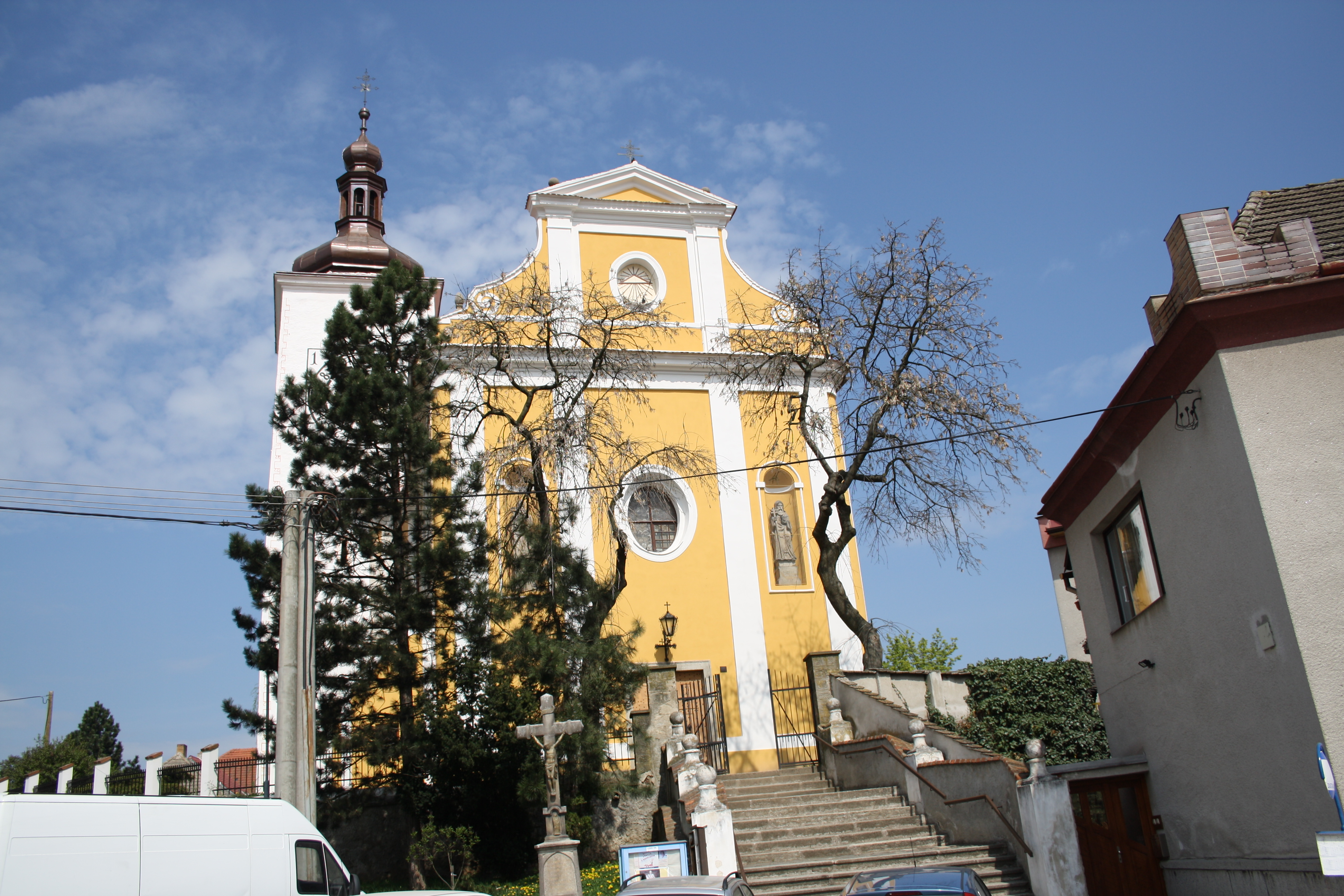
Church of Saint James the Great

The main landmark is the Church of Saint James the Great. It is a late Romanesque building, rebuilt in the Baroque style. The tower dates from 1597.

== Notable people ==
- Bernard Grun (1901–1972), German composer and conductor
