= Ralph Reader =

English actor (1903–1982)

Ralph Reader CBE
- Born: 25 May 1903; Crewkerne, Somerset, England
- Died: 18 May 1982 (aged 78)
- Occupations: Actor, theatrical producer, and songwriter
- Known for: Staging the original Gang Show

William Henry Ralph Reader CBE (25 May 1903 – 18 May 1982) was a British actor, theatrical producer and songwriter, known for staging the original Gang Show, a variety entertainment presented by members of the Scouting movement, and for leading community singing at FA Cup Finals.

== Childhood ==
Reader was born in Crewkerne, Somerset, England, the son of a Salvation Army bandmaster. He was orphaned by the age of eight, and brought up by aunts and uncles. Joining the Scout movement at 11, he put on Scout shows as a patrol leader in the 2nd Denton and South Heighton Troop in Newhaven, Sussex.

His first job was as delivery boy for a relative's greengrocer's shop in Seaford. His employer took Reader to Brighton to buy supplies and then visit the Hippodrome theatre, where he saw many music hall stars of the day. At the age of 14, he became a telegram messenger and, at 15, an office boy at a cement works. From Magheramorne, County Antrim, Ireland, he moved after what he described as "seven gloriously happy months", to New York, where he began his stage career.

== Early career ==
In 1920, Reader moved to America, working in various menial jobs, while acting in and directing off-Broadway shows. Aged 21, he choreographed his first Broadway show, and The New York Times wrote: "Watch Ralph Reader". Returning to England, he produced and choreographed West End productions, notably variety performances at Drury Lane and at the Hippodrome.

In 1932, still in Scouting, he anonymously staged his first all-Scout variety show at the Scala Theatre, London. The Gang's All Here featured 150 Boy Scouts, largely from London's East End, performing sketches, songs and dance numbers. The three performances were well received by public and critics. The following year, The Gang Comes Back at the Scala played to capacity houses. The public and press began referring to "The Gang Show".

In 1934, that became its title, and Reader acknowledged he was their producer. Besides the Gang Shows, in 1936, Reader wrote and directed a dramatic pageant called The Boy Scout, with a cast of 1,500 Scouts at the Royal Albert Hall. In the same year, he wrote and played the lead in a feature film called The Gang Show which premiered at the Lyceum Theatre, London in April 1937.

In November 1937, "a bunch of Boy Scouts", as one writer described them, became the first amateurs to appear at a Royal Variety Performance, sharing billing with Gracie Fields, George Formby and Max Miller.

== War service ==
Through the prewar Gang Shows, Reader became friends with Air Commodore Archibald Boyle, the deputy director of RAF Intelligence. The German Ambassador, Joachim von Ribbentrop, attended the 1938 London Gang Show and invited Reader to visit the Hitler Youth Movement in Germany. Boyle persuaded Reader to become an Intelligence Officer in the Royal Air Force Volunteer Reserve with the rank of Flight Lieutenant, although the diplomatic situation had deteriorated before he could take up von Ribbentrop's invitation.

On the outbreak of war, Boyle sent Reader to France for undercover work, in the guise of running a concert party, for which some former Gang Show members were recruited into the RAF. The show was entitled Ralph Reader and Ten Blokes from the Gang Show. Besides allowing Reader to complete intelligence tasks, it had a positive effect on morale.

On returning to England, Reader was ordered to expand the Gang Shows, while his visits to RAF stations allowed Reader to monitor subversive propaganda, which was a concern of the RAF high command. Reader eventually raised twenty-four RAF Gang Show units and two female WAAF units, with a total establishment of nearly four hundred serving personnel. The RAF Gang Shows toured nearly every theatre of war, from Iceland to Burma.

By 1944, Gang Show units were estimated to have travelled 100,000 miles and entertained 3,500,000 servicemen. Some of those who served in the RAF Gang Shows would later become well known entertainers, such as Peter Sellers, Tony Hancock, Harry Worth, Dick Emery and Cardew Robinson. For his services to the Royal Air Force, Reader was appointed an MBE (Military Division) in 1943.

== Postwar career ==
After the war Reader set up his own production company, Ralph Reader Limited, which revived many shows he had produced before the war. The first postwar Gang Show ran for three weeks at the Blackpool Opera House, and broke the theatre's records. He also began producing the London Gang Show in 1950, usually at the Golders Green Hippodrome in north London, and wrote more songs and musical plays for the Scout Association. He produced the Gang Show annually until 1974, and his association with it continued until his death.

He published an autobiography, It's Been Terrific, in 1953, with a second volume, Ralph Reader Remembers, in 1974. He was appointed Commander of the Most Excellent Order of the British Empire (CBE) in 1957 "for services to the Boy Scouts Association". In the 1970s, he was appointed to the post of Chief Scout's Commissioner, and in 1975 was awarded the Bronze Wolf, the only distinction of the World Organization of the Scout Movement, awarded by the World Scout Committee for exceptional services to world Scouting. He died in 1982, one week short of his 79th birthday.

Reader was interviewed twice for the BBC radio programme Desert Island Discs (in 1944 and in 1961); only extracts from the later episode have survived. He was the subject of This Is Your Life in November 1963, when he was surprised by Eamonn Andrews at the BBC Television Theatre.

== Legacy ==
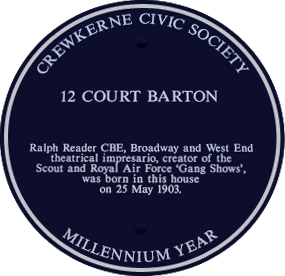
Plaque on birthplace

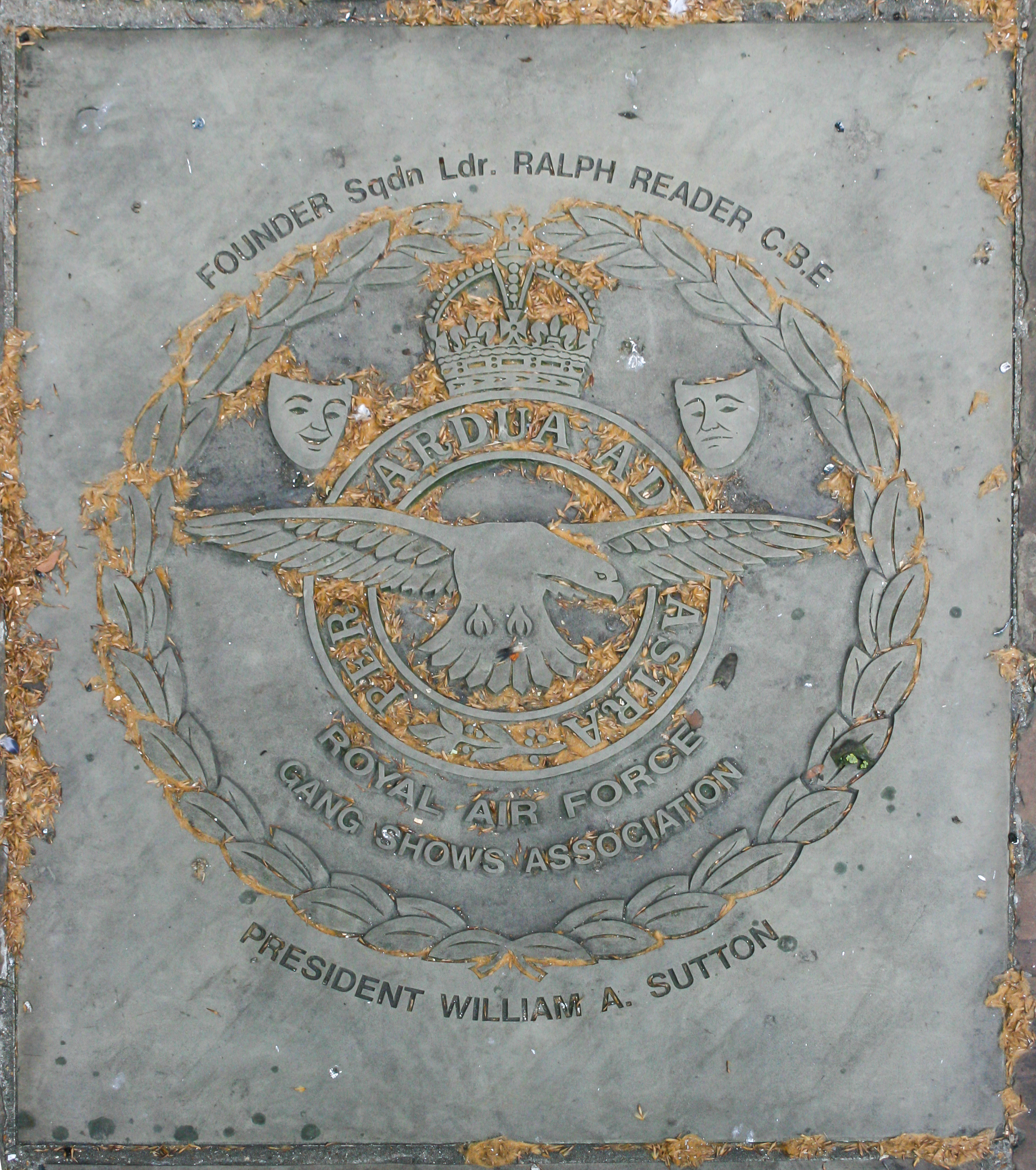
Memorial stone at St Clement Danes

Following his death, the Ralph Reader Memorial Fund was established with contributions from friends, colleagues and members of various Gang Shows. It continues to "assist deserving individual members of the Scout and Guide Movements under the age of 20 years. Grants may be given towards the costs of camp fees, Scout and Guide uniform, travel to Scout or Guide events, career training, convalescence after an illness, or any other purpose.”

In May 1984, a stone bench was unveiled in his memory outside the Church of St Clement Danes in the Strand, London, by the Royal Air Force Gang Show Association, in commemoration of his wartime entertainment work. In 2000, a blue plaque was placed on his birthplace at 12 Court Barton, Crewkerne, and on 8 October 2011, a further blue plaque was unveiled on his childhood home in Heighton Road, Denton, Newhaven.

The 2nd Denton Scouts are known as Ralph Reader's Own.

Since April 2015, Ralph Reader was added as one of the names on the buses that operate on the new Coaster 12 route of the Brighton & Hove Bus Company between Brighton and Eastbourne going through Denton Corner.

== Songs written ==
- "On the Crest of a Wave"
- "In My Dreams I'm Going Back to Gilwell"
- "Scout Hymn"
- "Strollin'"
- "No Show Like A Gang Show"
- "We'll Go On And On"
- "Where Do We Go From Here?"
- "Nobody Wants To Know"
- "It's A Wonderful Life"
- "Together"
- "A Touch of Silver"
- "These Are the Times"
- "Freedom"
- "It's Gonna Be Warm"
- "Making Memories"
- "Stepping Out"
- "Make Friends With People"
- "Everybody Must Have Someone"
- "Troubles Rolling Down The River"
- "You Can't Go Wrong If You're Right"
- "Birds of a Feather"
- "I Got the Call"
- "Homeward Bound"
- "Lady Macbeth"
- "Till the Cows Come Home"
- "Thanksgiving Day"
- "Fall in Love"
- "Happy Ending"
- "I Don't Want My Mother to Know"
- "Don't Do It, Nellie"
- "I Want to be a Pin-Up Girl"
- "Sail Your Dreamboat"
- "Gee it's great to be young"

== Published works ==
- Good Turns for Scout Shows (1933)
- Oh, Scouting is a Boy (1950)
- It's Been Terrific (1953), an autobiography, originally priced as 10 shillings 6 pence, published by Werner Laurie
- This is the Gang Show (1957), a history and guide to producing Gang Shows, 247 pages, published by C. Arthur Pearson Limited, London
- Ralph Reader Remembers (1974), an autobiography

== Selected filmography ==
- The Blue Squadron (1934)
- Limelight (1936)
- The Gang Show (1937)
- Splinters in the Air (1937)
- Derby Day (1952)
- These Dangerous Years (1957)

== Bibliography ==
- Reader, Ralph This is The Gang Show, C. Arthur Pearson Ltd [London], 1957
- Reader, Ralph Ralph Reader Remembers, Bailey Brothers and Swinfen [London], 1975
