= Gang Show =

Scouting theatrical performance

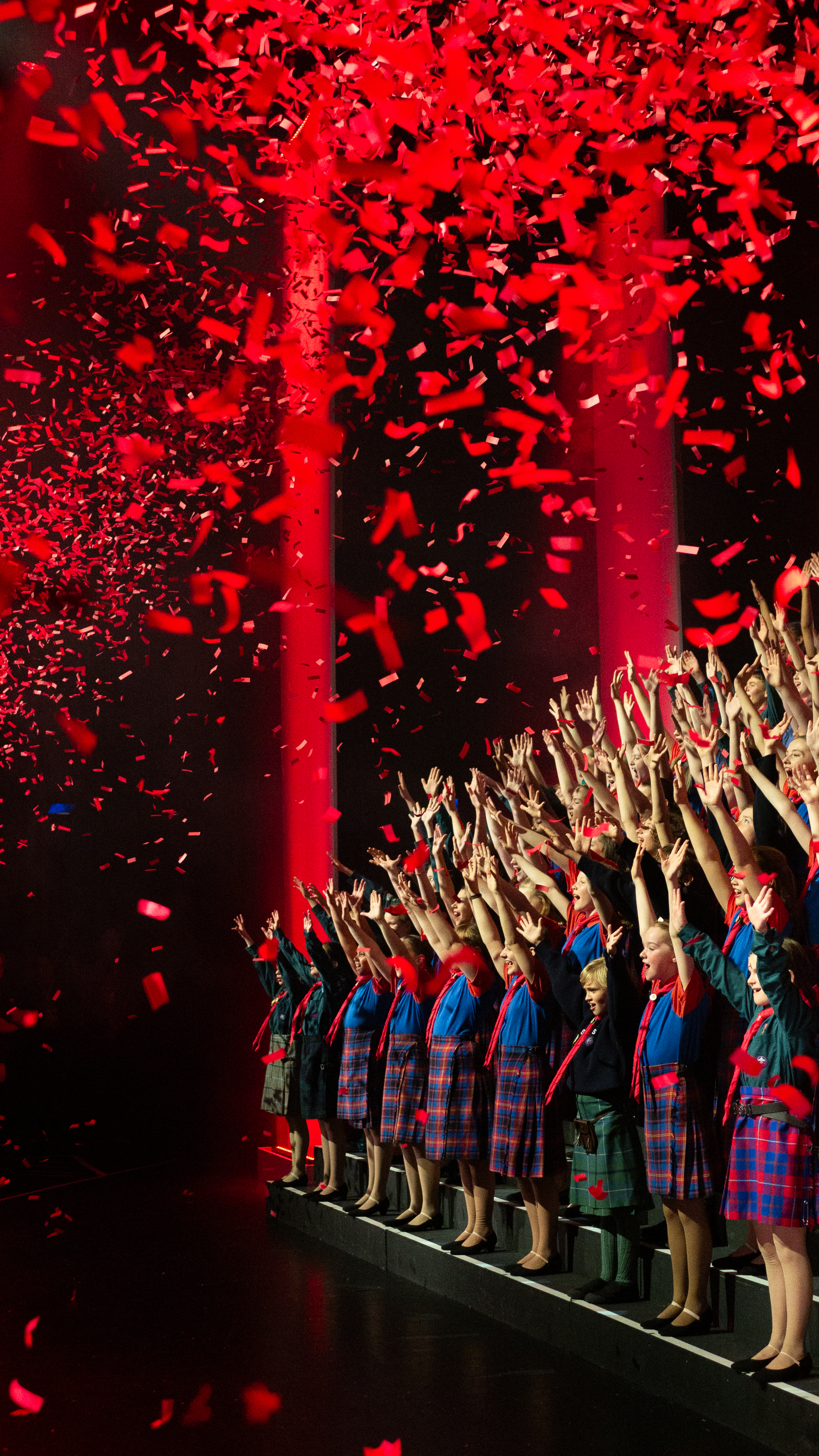
Image of the finale at Edinburgh's Gang Show 2024

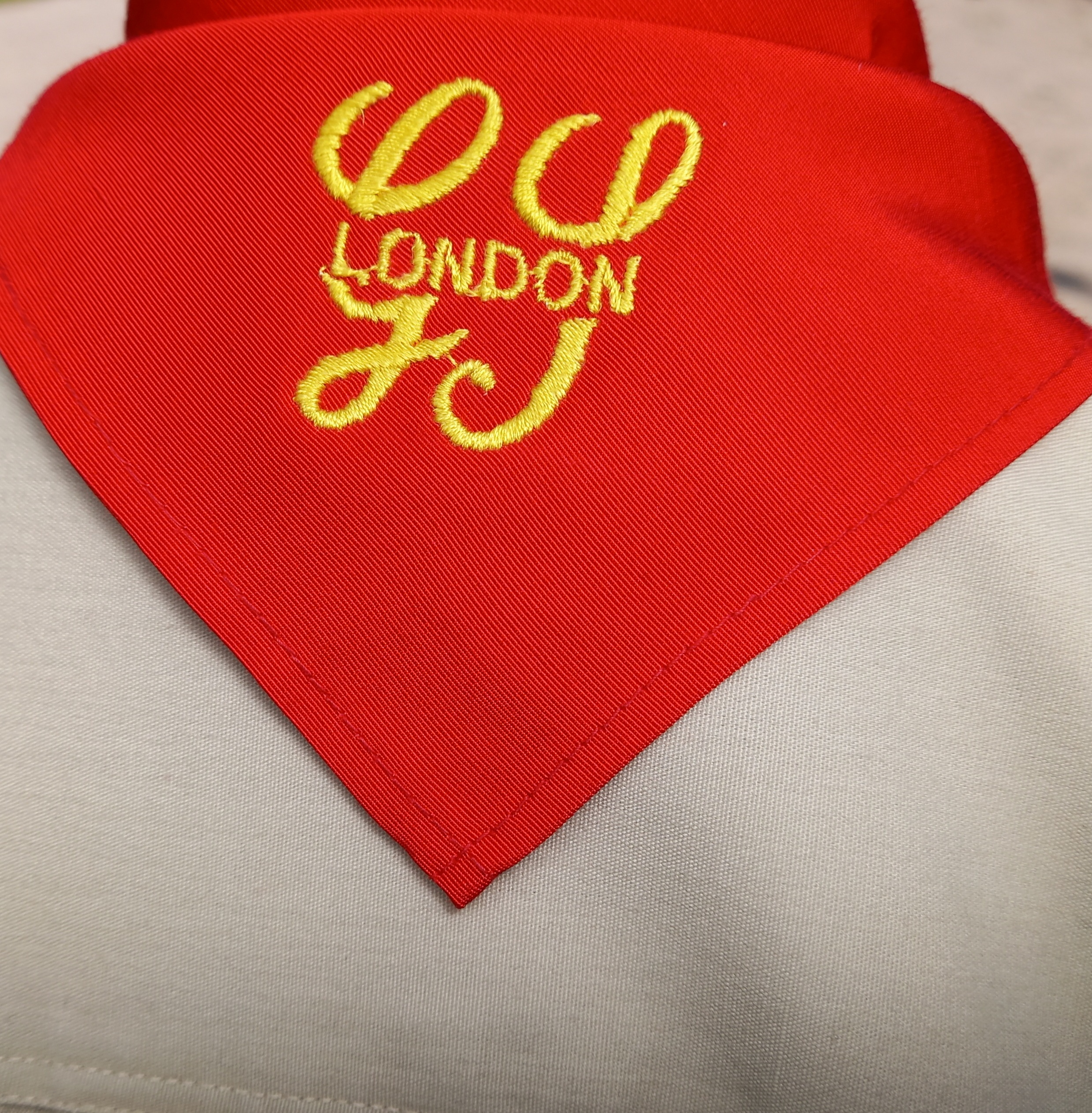
The scarf or neckerchief of the London Gang Show, worn by a former member of the cast.

A Gang Show is a theatrical performance by members of Scouts and Guides. The shows are produced with the dual aims of providing a learning opportunity for young people in the performing arts, as well as contributing to the artistic and cultural growth of their local community.

Gang Shows have members of all ages involved, however, the on-stage performers are often limited to current youth members (aged under 25 in most cases). Other areas have members of all ages, including backstage, technical, administration and management.

Gang Shows are entirely volunteer run, and often feature a majority of work written by Scouting and Guiding members.

The shows may be a simple affair in a local scout hall, but often take place in a local theater. A season may run for a single weekend, but performance seasons lasting one or two weeks are common. Tickets to these shows are often available to the public, and can be a useful tool to engage the local community in Scouting.

== History ==
Woven badge issued to commemorate the 75th Anniversary of Gang Show productions

In 1931, Ralph Reader, a Rover Scout trying to make his mark in theatre in the United States and London, was asked to write a Scout-based variety show to raise money for a swimming pool at Downe Scout Camp (now a Scout Association National Activity Centre). Rehearsals began under Reader's direction on 25 May 1932, his 29th birthday.

Initially the show did not have a title, but during a rehearsal break, Reader recalled, he asked a cast member if everyone was ready, to which the response was "Aye, aye Skip, the gang's all here". The first production, The Gang's All Here, ran between 30 October and 1 November 1932 at the Scala Theatre in central London.

The show was not a sell-out, but enough was raised to fund the swimming pool and the show was well received. Baden-Powell, the founder of Scouting, persuaded Reader to produce another show in 1933. This was The Gang Comes Back, which ran for a week.

In 1937, the London show became the first amateur production to have a Royal Command Performance (an honour repeated in 1957 and 1964). A feature film called The Gang Show, starring Ralph Reader and The Gang, premièred at the Lyceum Theatre, London in April the same year, and in New York in December 1938.

Following the Second World War, the London Gang Show restarted in December 1950 at the King's Theatre, Hammersmith, in the presence Princess Margaret. In 1952, the show moved to the larger Golders Green Hippodrome and in 1954, Queen Elizabeth II was the guest of honour. 1972 was the 40th anniversary of the Gang Show and was attended by the Queen and Prince Philip, Duke of Edinburgh; highlights of the show were televised by the BBC and famous former cast members, Dick Emery, Graham Stark, David Lodge and Brian Johnston were interviewed.

== Gang Shows around the world ==
Cover of the 2006 Cumberland, Australia, Gang Show program

Since the first show in London, productions have been organised around the world, Ireland, Australia, New Zealand and Canada.

In 1958 Reader went to Chicago to produce and direct the first Gang Show in America. He returned to Chicago next year to guide the second. Reader first went to Chicago in 1920 as a teenager and began his stage career there.

Newcastle Gang Show started in April 1937 followed by Peterborough Gang Show in November 1937 and apart from the war years has run ever since. Harpenden Gang Show has performed every year since 1949, making it the longest continuously running Gang Show in the world.

It is often said that every night, a Gang Show is performing around the world.

== Gang Show spin-offs ==
In Melbourne, Australia, the Showtimes came out of the strong theatre culture of the area. These are smaller than the local Gang Show, with the exception of Whitehorse Showtime which is the largest show in the Southern Hemisphere, originally pulling from a single district to produce a show. Currently, there are four of these shows; Whitehorse Showtime, South Metro Showtime, Camberwell Showtime and Strzelecki Showtime. Because these showtimes are not Gang Shows, they do not have the red scarf instead choosing a different colour, such as Strzelecki Showtime's gold scarf or Whitehorse Showtime’s lilac scarf .

== Bibliography ==
- Reader, Ralph This is The Gang Show, C. Arthur Pearson Ltd [London], 1957
- Reader, Ralph Ralph Reader Remembers, Bailey Brothers and Swinfen [London], 1975
