= Goodnight, Vienna =

1932 film

- Opening titles
- Directed by: Herbert Wilcox
- Written by: George Posford; Eric Maschwitz (as Holt Marvell); Miles Malleson
- Produced by: Herbert Wilcox
- Starring: Jack Buchanan; Anna Neagle; Gina Malo
- Cinematography: Freddie Young
- Edited by: Michael Hankinson
- Music by: Tony Lowry; Harry Perritt
- Distributed by: United Artists
- Release date: 28 March 1932
- Running time: 75 minutes
- Country: United Kingdom
- Language: English
- Budget: £23,000

Goodnight, Vienna (also known as Magic Night) is a 1932 British musical film directed by Herbert Wilcox and starring Jack Buchanan, Anna Neagle and Gina Malo. It was written by George Posford, Eric Maschwitz (as Holt Marvell) and Miles Malleson based on a BBC radio operetta by Maschwitz. it features the song "Good-night, Vienna".

Two lovers in Vienna are separated by the First World War, but are later reunited.

== Plot ==
Max is an Austrian officer in the army and son of a highly placed general. His father wants him to marry a Countess but he has fallen in love with Vicki. Attending a party given in his honour, they are informed that war has broken out. Max writes a note to Vicki and goes off to war. Unfortunately the note is lost. Some time after the war, Max is just a shoe shop assistant while Vicki is now a famous singer. They meet and at first she snubs him but then falls in love with him again.

== Cast ==
- Jack Buchanan as Captain Maximilian Schletoff
- Anna Neagle as Vicki
- Gina Malo as Frieda
- Clive Currie as General Schletoff
- William Kendall as Ernst
- Joyce Bland as Countess Helga
- Gibb McLaughlin as Max's orderly
- Herbert Carrick as Johann
- Clifford Heatherley as Donelli
- O. B. Clarence as theatre manager
- Peggy Cartwright as Greta
- Muriel Aked as Marya
- Aubrey Fitzgerald as waiter

== Production ==
Herbert Wilcox was played the score by Eric Maschwitz and George Posford. He liked it and bought the rights. Within a week Wilcox persuaded Jack Buchanan to play the lead. He wanted Lea Seidl or Evelyn Lane to play the female lead but neither was available. He went to tell Buchanan that the film was going to be postponed; Buchanan was playing in a show Stand Up and Sing with Anna Neagle. Wilcox was impressed by Neagle and cast her at a fee of £150. The film was shot in three weeks before Buchanan had to leave to appear in Stand Up and Sing at Liverpool. Wilcox reportedly cast Neagle, whom he would later marry and direct in many films, after discovering her by chance in a stage show. During the making of the film, Wilcox and Neagle fell in love.

== Reception ==
According to Wilcox, it was his most commercially successful until that time.

Kine Weekly wrote: "British studios have achieved with this gay, delightful and wholly romantic comedy, with music a picture which – while not on so vast a scale – is certainly comparable with Congress Dances. The production shows imagination, and there is wit in the dialogue and real harmony in the music. Acting is excellent and the general polished technique of the film makes it an outstanding offering."

Picture Show wrote: "Should be a great success, as it has all the ingredients – lilting music, romance, pathos, comedy – and Jack Buchanan. The slender story deals with the love affair of a littel flower-shop girl, charmingly played by Anna Neagle, and a dashing young officer."

== Cultural references ==
- In the UK TV series Rising Damp (1974–1978) the lead character Rigsby often puts his cat Vienna out with the phrase "Goodnight, Vienna".
- The phrase is used in the 2006 TV movie Housewife, 49 when someone passes away.
- Goodnight Vienna is the title of the fourth album by ex-Beatle Ringo Starr.
- In the opening scene of the BBC series Jeeves and Wooster episode "The Purity of the Turf", Hugh Laurie, in the character of Bertie Wooster, sings fragments of the film's title song.
- In the BBC's Sherlock, "The Great Game" (Series 1: Episode 3), Benedict Cumberbatch's Sherlock examines a corpse, saying, "Nasty wound. Tetanus bacteria enters the bloodstream... Good night, Vienna."
- In the video game Bloons Tower Defense 6, upon seeing a B.A.D., the hero Benjamin will simply say "Goodnight, Vienna."
- In the film The Death of Stalin (2017), Paul Whitehouse plays Anastas Mikoyan who tells Jeffrey Tambor's character, Malenkov: "I salute you, top boy, and I salute your haircut. Goodnight, Vienna."
