= Bernard Grun =

German composer and conductor

Bernard Grun (German: Bernhard Grün; 11 February 1901 – 28 December 1972) was a Central European composer, conductor, and author. He is primarily remembered as the compiler of The Timetables of History.

== Early life ==
Grün was born on 11 February 1901 in Startsch, Moravia, Austria-Hungary (now Stařeč, Czech Republic). He completed a degree in philosophy and a doctorate in law at Vienna and Prague, going on to study music theory at Vienna's national music academy under Alban Berg, Hans Gál, Felix von Weingartner, and Egon Wellesz.

== Career ==
Grün composed chamber music and songs and took work as a conductor in Karlsruhe and Mannheim before joining the Comedy House (Komödienhaus) in Vienna. The 1920 film Die Erlebnisse der berühmten Tänzerin Fanny Elssler featured a screenplay by Grün. From 1924 to 1929 he worked as a conductor in Prague at the Neues Deutsches Theater (New German Theatre).

His first major work was the 1929 Bohemian Musicians, performed in Vienna in 1930, and he composed music for the soundtrack of the 1932 film Ein Auto und kein Geld. Grün completed Marlene's Wedding and Gaby before being forced to leave Austria ahead of its unification with Nazi Germany. Balalaika was released in 1936, with a Nelson Eddy song that became an international hit. Grun moved to the United Kingdom in 1939, anglicising his name to "Bernard Grun". Following this, he co-composed music for the 1938 musical Magyar Melody. On 27 March 1939, it became the first musical to be broadcast directly from a theatre and shown on television (BBC TV).

In 1946, he published his compilation The Timetables of History, adapted from Werner Stein's Kulturfahrplan, presenting human history since 5000 BC in tabular form. Each century, then decade, then year, is presented with its major events (if known) divided under the seven headings:

- Influential leaders and political events
- Literature & Theater
- Religion, Philosophy, Learning
- Visual Arts
- Music
- Scientific and technological inventions
- Daily Life, innovations, trends.

It has been in constant publication, with the most recent update in 2005.

In the postwar period, Grun continued writing film music for titles such as White Cradle Inn (1947), The Blind Goddess and Brass Monkey (all from 1948).

In 1952, "Broken Wings", a song which Grun co-wrote, was published. Grun was credited as a composer alongside John Jerome, which was a collaborative pseudonym for Harold Cornelius Fields, Howard Ellington Barnes and Joseph Dominic Roncoroni. The song entered the UK Singles Chart in a recording by The Stargazers, a British vocal group, in February 1953. The same month, two other recordings of the song also entered the UK chart: an American recording by Art and Dotty Todd (which peaked at number 6), and one by British singer Dickie Valentine (which reached number 12). The Stargazers' recording climbed to number 1 in April 1953. The song also made number 1 on the UK's sheet music sales chart in February 1953, where it stayed for six weeks.

Over the course of his life, Grun served as the musical director of theatres in Prague, Vienna, Berlin, and London, including His Majesty's Theatre. In addition to his own output, he was also responsible for adapting various musical works, including Bizet's Carmen, Lehár's Count of Luxembourg, Millöcker's Dubarry, and Benatzky's White Horse Inn.

== Personal life and death ==
Grun married the British fashion designer Edith Hart. He died of a heart attack on 21 December 1972 in Berlin while on a speaking tour, aged 71.

== Works ==
=== Print ===
Grun authored the books:

- The Timetables of History (1946)
- Private Lives of the Great Composers, Conductors, and Musical Artistes of the World (1954)
- Prince of Vienna: The Life, the Times, and the Melodies of Oscar Straus (1955)
- The Golden Quill (1956)
- Fanny Beloved (1959)
- Die Leichte Muse: Kulturgeschichte der Operette (1961)
- Aller Spass dieser Welt (1965)
- Gold und Silber: Franz Lehár und Seine Welt, translated as Gold and Silver: The Life and Times of Franz Lehár (1970)
- Alban Berg: Letters to His Wife (1971, editor and translator)
- Bernard Grun's Beste Musiker Anekdoten (1974)
- Mit Takt und Taktstock: Musikeranekdoten (1979)

=== Music ===
Grun composed the music for over 30 musicals, including:

- Böhmische Musikanten (1929)
- Musik um Susi (1932)
- Marlenes Brautfahrt (1933)
- Die Tänzerin Fanny Elßler (1934)
- Gaby (1936)
- Balalaika (1936 musical, with George Posford)
- Madame Sans-Gêne (1937)
- Old Chelsea (1943, in part)
- Summer Song (1956 arrangement of Dvorak)

=== Filmography ===
Grun's work featured in over 60 films, mainly in the 1930s and '40s, including:

- Die Erlebnisse der Berühmten Tänzerin Fanny Elßler (1920, writer)
- An Auto and No Money (1932, composer)
- Balalaika (1939 & 1948, composer)
- Magyar Melody (1939, composer)
- White Cradle Inn (1947, released as High Fury in US; composer, arranger, & conductor)
- Brass Monkey (1948, composer)
- The Blind Goddess (1948, composer)
