= Eric Maschwitz =

British writer and broadcaster (1901–1969)

Eric Maschwitz OBE
- Maschwitz (left) with Jack Strachey (right)
- Born: Albert Eric Maschwitz; 10 June 1901; Edgbaston, Birmingham, UKGBI
- Died: 27 October 1969 (aged 68); Sunninghill, Berkshire, UK
- Education: Gonville and Caius College, Cambridge
- Spouses: Hermione Gingold (m. 1926; div. 1945); Phyllis Crawford Gordon (m. 1945)
- Writing career
- Pen name: Holt Marvell
- Notable awards: Order of the British Empire, 1936

Albert Eric Maschwitz OBE (10 June 1901 – 27 October 1969), also known by the pseudonym Holt Marvell, was a British writer, lyricist, editor and broadcaster.

== Early life and education ==
Maschwitz was born Albert Eric Maschwitz on 10 June 1901 in Edgbaston, Birmingham to a Albert Arthur Maschwitz, a merchant, and Leontine Hilda Maschwitz (née Bockemann). Maschwitz's father was of Lithuanian and German descent, and his mother was Australian of German descent. (Note: Maschwitz's parents are also cited as being Lithuanian–Jewish immigrants.)

Educated at Arden House preparatory school in Henley-in-Arden and Repton School, Maschwitz later studied modern languages at Gonville and Caius College, Cambridge.

== Career ==
As a lyricist, Maschwitz wrote, often credited to his pseudonym "Holt Marvell", the screenplays of several successful films in the 1930s and 1940s, but is perhaps best remembered for his lyrics to 1940s popular songs such as "A Nightingale Sang in Berkeley Square" (music by Manning Sherwin) and "These Foolish Things" (music by Jack Strachey, reinterpreted in 1973 by Bryan Ferry on his first solo album of the same name). According to the Oxford Dictionary of National Biography, Maschwitz had a brief romantic liaison with British cabaret singer Jean Ross, the inspiration for Sally Bowles in Christopher Isherwood's stories about 1930s Berlin, later adapted as the musical Cabaret, and their relationship inspired the lyrics for "These Foolish Things". (Other sources have suggested that either Maschwitz's wife Hermione Gingold or American actress Anna May Wong inspired the lyrics, but Maschwitz's autobiography cites "fleeting memories of [a] young love.")

Maschwitz started his stage acting career in the early 1920s, playing Vittoria in the first successful modern production of Webster's The White Devil (Marlowe Society, Cambridge ADC Theatre, 1920). He joined the BBC in 1926. His first radio show was In Town Tonight. While at the BBC, he wrote a radio operetta Goodnight Vienna, with the popular song of the same title co-written by George Posford. In 1932, it was adapted as a film, Goodnight, Vienna, starring Anna Neagle.

Between 1927 and 1933, Maschwitz was the editor of the weekly broadcast listings magazine Radio Times. Under contract to MGM in Hollywood from 1937, he co-wrote the adaptation of Goodbye, Mr. Chips, made by MGM-British, for which he shared an Academy Award nomination.

From August 1939, he was a postal censor in Liverpool. From November 1939, he served with the Secret Intelligence Service (SIS)/MI-6 D Section (sabotage). In 1940, he briefly worked to establish a resistance organization in Beverley, Yorkshire, and for Army Welfare in London before being assigned to the Special Operations Executive (SOE). In 1940 he was commissioned into the Intelligence Corps. He was then sent to New York City to work for the British Security Coordination (BSC). In 1942, he returned to London, briefly supervising radio programmes for the troops. He then transferred to the Political Warfare Executive (PWE). He ended the war as chief broadcasting officer with the 21st Army Group, leaving the army as a lieutenant-colonel. Maschwitz, along with Major John MacMillan (members of "No 1 Field Broadcasting Unit"), was responsible for taking over the "Reichssender Hamburg" on 3 May 1945.

This requisition enabled the British occupation troops to start broadcasting programmes for their soldiers in northern Germany, and was the nucleus for the British Forces Network (BFN), inaugurated with Maschwitz's help in July 1945, eventually to become the British Forces Broadcasting Service (BFBS).

In 1947, Maschwitz became chairman of the Songwriters' Guild of Great Britain, which was founded by Ivor Novello, Sir Alan Herbert, Eric Coates, Haydn Wood, Richard Addinsell and others, for the encouragement and protection of British popular music. He was the first Vice Chair and Chairman from July 1948 for one year, and again between December 1954 and April 1958.

In 1958, near the start of the BBC/ITV ratings wars, he rejoined the BBC as Head of Television Light Entertainment.

Maschwitz left to join the rival ITV in 1963. During the course of his varied entertainment career, Maschwitz also adapted French comedies such as Thirteen For Dinner; wrote the book and lyrics for numerous musicals, amongst them Balalaika, Summer Song, which used the music of Dvorak, Happy Holiday (based on Arnold Ridley's play The Ghost Train), and Zip Goes a Million, which was written specially for George Formby; and he was the creator of the radio series Café Collette. He also edited the Radio Times, and turned his hand to the detective novel: Death at Broadcasting House, co-written with Val Gielgud and published in 1934, revolves around a radio play disrupted by the murder of one of the cast, which was also filmed in the same year, under the same title.

His autobiography, No Chip On My Shoulder, was published by Herbert Jenkins in 1957.

He was created an Officer of the Order of the British Empire (OBE) in 1936.

== Personal life ==
On 25 January 1926, Maschwitz married the actress Hermione Gingold Divorcing in April 1945, Maschwitz married Phyllis Crawford Gordon on 14 November.

Maschwitz died on 27 October 1969, aged 68, at Ascot Nursing Home in Sunninghill, Berkshire.

== Selected filmography ==
- Invitation to the Waltz (1935)
- Land Without Music (1936)
- Cafe Colette (1937)
- Little Red Monkey (1955)
