= Arthur Albro =

American opera singer and actor

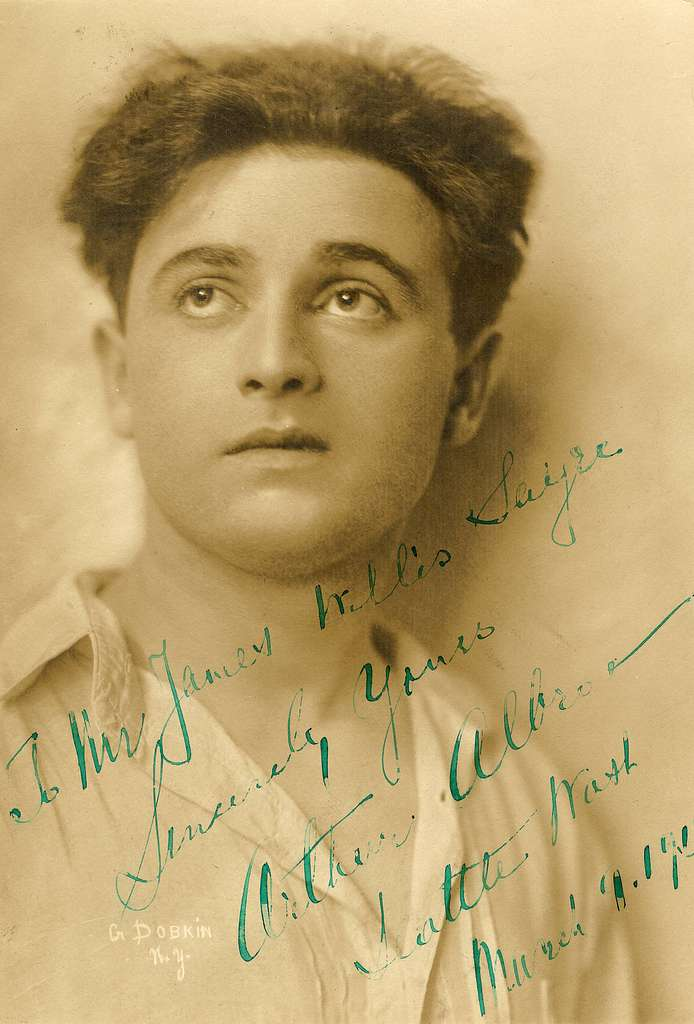
1913 photograph of Arthur Albro

Arthur Albro (October 30, 1883 or October 31, 1885 – September 24, 1944) was a Russian-born American tenor and actor. On stage he performed mainly in light operas and musicals with the exception of one season in which he performed grand opera parts with the Chicago Grand Opera Company. He was active on Broadway from 1911 through 1922, where he achieved his greatest successes portraying gypsy characters in the operetta Gypsy Love and the musical Maytime. He also starred in the revues The Passing Show of 1918 and The Passing Show of 1922. Albro toured the U.S. as Jozsi in Gypsy Love and performed the role in multiple revivals into the early 1920s. He later returned to the New York stage in 1931 in Aben Kandel's play Hot Money. On screen he starred in the silent films The Closing Net (1915) and A Damsel in Distress (1919), and appeared in one sound film, Wedding on the Volga (1929).

== Early life and education ==
Born in Odessa (then part of Russia) on either October 30, 1883 or October 31, 1885, Arthur Albro was the son of Alexander Austin and his wife Saveli Austin. He immigrated with his family to the United States in July 1906 where he settled in New York and became a naturalized citizen. He was educated as a dental surgeon in Europe and operated a dental practice on DeKalb Avenue in Brooklyn in his early years in New York.

Albro studied singing in Milan, Italy prior to coming to the United States. He began his United States career at the Metropolitan Opera as a member of the chorus; having previously sung in a similar capacity at La Scala. He was performing in Leipzig, Germany where he was "discovered by A. H. Woods"; an American theatrical producer who cast him in his early work as a leading performer in the American theatre.

== Career ==
=== Early work ===
By August 1909 Albro was touring as an imitator of tenor Enrico Caruso in Lew Dockstader's theatre troupe in which he performed the aria "Vesti la giubba" from Pagliacci. Some of the stops on the tour that year included the Stone Opera House in Binghamton, New York, the Teck Theatre in Buffalo, New York, the Garrick Theater in Chicago, the Colonial Theatre in Cleveland, Ohio, the Shubert Theatre in Kansas City, Missouri, and the Alvin Theater in Pittsburgh, Pennsylvania. The company notably included a young Al Jolson, and by the time the show reached the Globe Theatre in Boston in January 1910, Albro was singing in the production alongside William H. Thompson.

In April 1910 Albro gave a recital as the Crescent Theatre in Brooklyn in a program which also featured cellist Alberto Colombo, violinist Alfred Gill, and singer and pianist Mrs. William E. Annis. This grouping then toured together in recitals for the rest of the year. In May 1911 he shared the stage with Metropolitan Opera contalto Louise Homer in a benefit concert given at the Waldorf Astoria New York for the Little Mothers' Aid Association. That same month he performed with James Thornton in a fund raiser for Mount Vernon Hospital, New York.

=== Gypsy Love ===
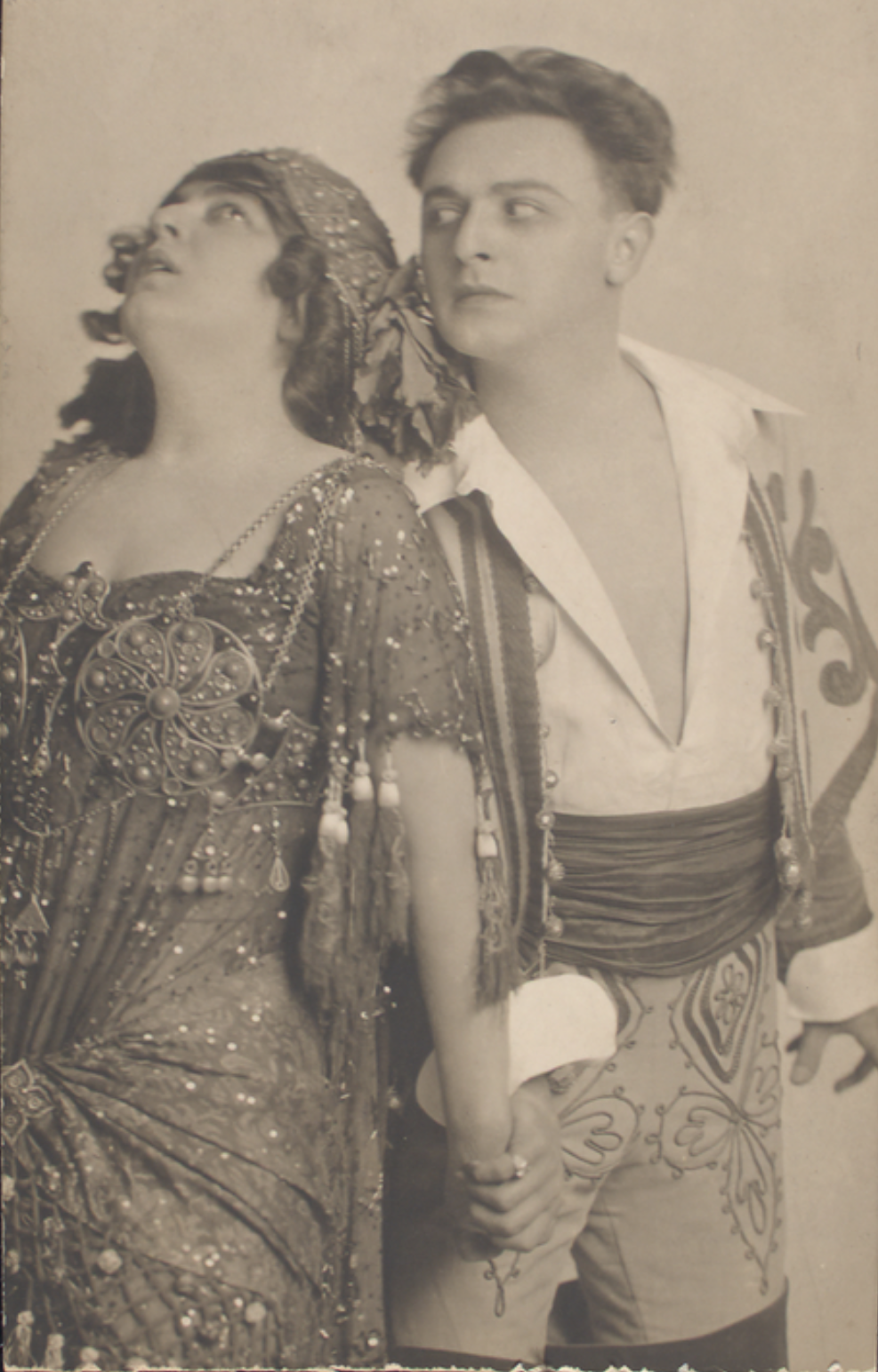
Photograph of Arthur Albro as Jozsi in Gypsy Love. The actress portraying Zorkia with Albro is unidentified. (Note: It is possible the actress appearing as Zorkia may be Marguerita Sylva. Other possibilities would be Phyllis Partington or Finita de Soria who portrayed Zorkia on tour. This photograph is from the collection of the Billy Rose Theatre Division at the New York Public Library for the Performing Arts.)

In the summer of 1911 Albro was cast as the leading tenor in the first American production of Franz Lehár's operetta Gypsy Love (German: Zigeunerliebe) opposite Marguerita Sylva in the lead female role. Albro and Sylva recorded the duet "Love is Like the Rose" from Gypsy Love for Edison Records later that year. The production of Gypsy Love began its stage life at the Forrest Theatre in Philadelphia where it premiered on October 2, 1911. The Philadelphia Inquirer gave good reviews for Albro and Sylva's performances, especially their singing, but were critical of the show's plot; dismissing the libretto as "incredibly unlikely and dull". The reviewer also praised the sets and costumes as "richly produced" and thought the score of the operetta was "masterful", but felt that the current trend towards Viennese operetta on the American stage had grown tired and that the production was unlikely to have a sustained run.

Gypsy Love transferred to Broadway where it opened at the Globe Theatre on October 17, 1911 with Albro as Jozsi, the gypsy role referred to in the operetta's title. The work was supposed to be a starring vehicle for Sylva, but it did not go well for her as she was sick on the opening night and had to stop mid performance and allow her understudy, Phyllis Partington, to replace her. In its review, The New York Sun stated, that Sylva was possibly the "most angry woman in New York" as her understudy was given "what amounted to an ovation". On top of this, critical reviews were highly laudatory of Albro's performance in Gypsy Love; with theatre historian Dan Dietz stating "Arthur Albro all but stole the show with his voice and good looks."

Critics considered Albro a rival to tenor Donald Brian who was a recent hit in another Lehar operetta The Merry Widow. The New York Times review stated, "Of the other members of the cast Albert Albro as the gypsy made the most pronounced impression. He was the figure to the life and he danced and sang with a Hungarian abandon which would have been very infectious under ordinary circumstances." The New York Sun stated that Albro "looked like a fairy prince out of a story book" and had a "delightful voice, a lithe figure, and a most romantic head of hair." Despite great reviews for Alvro, Sylva's illness on opening night had led to overall tepid reviews for Gypsy Love in the New York press, and the work was not a hit on Broadway. It closed on November 11, 1911 after just 31 performances.

Immediately after the close of the Broadway run, the Gypsy Love production began a lengthy tour of the United States. The tour was still active as late as February 1913 when it was playing in Los Angeles at the Mason Opera House with Albro still in the cast. Albro continued to perform with regularity in revivals of Gypsy Love in the United States into the early 1920s. Some of these included a 1917 touring production in New England which played at the Barre Opera House in Vermont, Parsons Theatre in Connecticut, and the Court Square Theater in Springfield, Massachusetts; and a 1920 production in Chicago at the Auditorium Theatre. Both the New England tour and the Chicago production were produced by Andreas Dippel.

=== Other stage work ===
==== 1910s ====
After leaving the national tour of Gypsy Love, Albro returned to Broadway as Hammerstein Harmony in A Glimpse of the Great White Way; a one act show produced by Lew Fields that was essentially a series of vaudeville acts tied together with a loose plot. This work was presented in a triple bill with the one act ballet Carmen and the one act musical The Modiste Shop which opened at the 44th Street Theatre (then called 44th St Music Hall) on October 27, 1913. It ran there for 84 performances; closing on December 7, 1913.

In 1914 Albro signed a contract with the Chicago Grand Opera Company with whom he performed the role of Don José in Carmen among other repertoire. He returned to Broadway as Count Pisianelli in librettist Rida Johnson Young and composer William Schroeder's musical Lady Luxury which played at the Casino Theatre in the 1914-1915 season. The Brooklyn Eagle stated that Albro was "given songs which his clear tenor voice brought out with effect", and The New York Sun critic hailed his voice as "an explosive tenor". Songs he performed in the show included the duet "Kiss Me Once More" which he sang with Alice Moffat and "When I Sing In Grand Opera" which was an ensemble number in which he was primary vocalist. He remained with the production when it went on national tour in 1915.

On April 11, 1916 Albro portrayed Alain Tenters in the United States premiere of Emmerich Kálmán's operetta Az obsitos. It was performed in English using a new libretto by Rida Johnson Young with the title Her Soldier Boy, and also included additional new music by Sigmund Romberg. He starred on Broadway in another musical with a book by Johnson Young, Maytime, which featured an original score by Romberg. He portrayed another gypsy in this show, Signor Vivalla, and sang the songs "Gypsy Song" and "Will Your Remember?" in the production. The show was a hit, and ran for over a year at the Shubert Theatre in 1917-1918. Another gypsy character in Albro's repertoire was the role of Pali Rácz in Emmerich Kálmán's Sari which he performed in January 1914 at Ford's Grand Opera House in Baltimore in a production mounted by Henry W. Savage.

Albro was one of the stars of the Broadway revue The Passing Show of 1918 in which he appeared with Adele and Fred Astaire at the Winter Garden Theatre. It featured a score co-authored by Romberg and Jean Schwartz. In 1919-1920 he toured in Maytime in the United States and Canada.

==== 1920s ====
On November 26, 1920 Albro made his UK concert debut in London. In 1921 he performed in British music halls with Marie Dainton, and separately at the Alhambra Theatre. He also performed in concerts with the Royal Artillery Band. Just prior to returning to the United States in July 1921, he traveled with several British companions to Rhodesia and the Belgian Congo where he spent a few months big game hunting. He then resumed touring in Maytime again in November 1921; this time doubling in the parts of Rodolfo and Signor Vivalla. This tour, organized by the Shubert family, continued into early 1922. Later that year he appeared in the musical revue The Passing Show of 1922 at the Apollo Theatre in Atlantic City, New Jersey and at the Winter Garden Theatre on Broadway.

Albro also starred in a 1922 production of Bruno Granichstaedten's operetta Bub oder Mädel? at the Kurtz Theatre in Bethlehem, Pennsylvania which was presented in English under the title The Rose Maid, and had the leading tenor role, Count Barakoff, in producer Francis Charles Coppicus's new musical Lola in Love which played in theaters in Pennsylvania Ohio, Massachusetts, and Connecticut in 1922-1923. The musical was an English language adaptation from a German operetta by Gustav Kadeburg and Arthur Rebner which featured a new score by Hugo Hirsch. After this show ended he resumed touring for the Shubert family in Maytime for the Spring of 1923.

In 1925-1926 Albro toured nationally in Romberg's The Student Prince as Von Asterberg in the Shubert family's chain of theaters. At that time, this operetta was a hit on Broadway and already had a popular touring company on the road; making this the third concurrent production of The Student Prince performing in the United States simultaneously within the Shubert theatre empire.

On October 31, 1928 Albro portrayed Arturo in the first performance of Herbert Stothart's musical Polly at the Shubert Playhouse in Wilmington, Delaware (now The Playhouse on Rodney Square) in a cast that notably featured a young Cary Grant (then known as Archie Leach). By the time that show reached Broadway in January 1929, Albro was no longer in the production and Tudor Penrose had taken over the part of Arturo.

==== 1930s ====
In 1930 Albro performed with Alice Gentle in a serialized radio melodrama The Troubles of Wanda which was broadcast on Chamberlain Brown's "Great Stars of Broadway" program on WGBS radio. The following year he was a member of Alice Brady's theatre troupe; performing the role of Tony Theodophilus in the play Ladies of the Jury by Fred Ballard. In November 1931 he returned to Broadway as Colombo in Aben Kandel's play Hot Money at George M. Cohan's Theatre.

=== Film appearances ===
By August 1915 Albro was under contract with Pathé Exchange was in the process of making the silent film The Closing Net. He portrayed the role of Chu Chu in this film which was based on a serialized murder mystery published in the Saturday Evening Post. He appeared in another Pathé Exchange feature, A Damsel in Distress (1919), in the role of Reggie Byng. It too was based on a serialized story from the Saturday Evening Post; this time penned by P. G. Wodehouse. He portrayed Alexis in the sound film Wedding on the Volga (1929, Hollywood Pictures); a film which was once thought lost but a copy of which was found in 2015.

== Later life ==
During World War I Albro was a lieutenant in the New York City Police Department Auxiliary Police (then known as the New York Police Reserves). At the time that his stage career was ending in the early 1930s he began working as a photographer in Brooklyn; operating a studio at 328 Monroe St.

Albro died from kidney failure at Parkchester General Hospital in the Bronx on September 24, 1944.

== Notes and references ==
=== Bibliography ===
- Dietz, Dan (2021). The Complete Book of 1910s Broadway Musicals. Rowman & Littlefield Publishers. ISBN 9781538150283.
- Franceschina, John (2004). Harry B. Smith: Dean of American Librettists. Taylor & Francis. ISBN 9781135949082.
- Gänzl, Kurt (2001). The Encyclopedia of the Musical Theatre, Second Edition. Vol. I. Schirmer Books. ISBN 9780028714455.
- Scott, Derek B. (2019). German Operetta on Broadway and in the West End, 1900–1940. Cambridge University Press. ISBN 9781108484589.
- Taves, Brian (2015). P.G. Wodehouse and Hollywood: Screenwriting, Satires and Adaptations. McFarland & Company. ISBN 9780786484430.
