= Douglas Wood (actor) =

American actor (1880–1966)

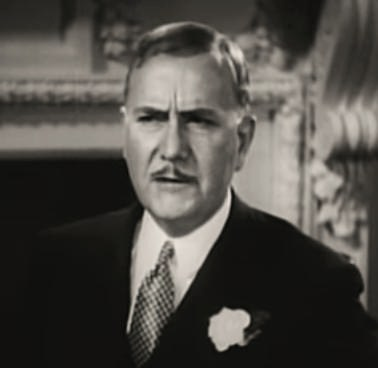
- Wood in screenshot from Great Guy (1936)
- Born: October 31, 1880; New York City, U.S.
- Died: January 13, 1966 (aged 85); Woodland Hills, California, U.S.
- Occupation: Actor
- Years active: 1900–1956

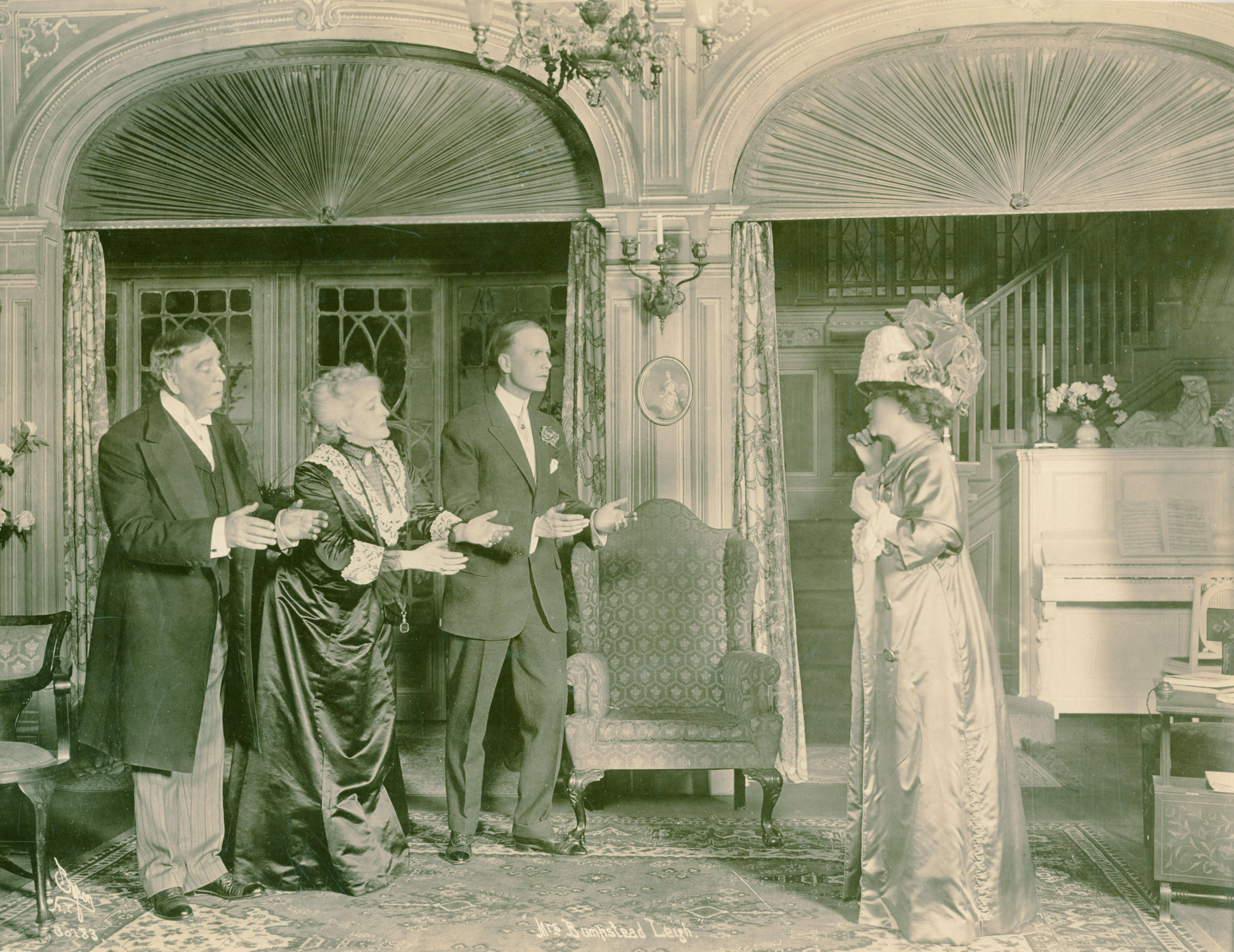
left to right: Charles Harbury, Kate Lester, Wood, Mrs. Fiske in Mrs Bumpstead-Leigh 1911.

Douglas Wood (October 31, 1880 – January 13, 1966) was an American actor of stage and screen during the first six decades of the 20th century. During the course of his career, Wood appeared in dozens of Broadway productions, and well over 100 films. Towards the end of his career, he also made several guest appearances on television. Wood died in 1966.

== Early years ==
His mother, Ida Jeffreys, was a stage actress.

== Career ==
=== Early career on Broadway ===
Wood made his Broadway acting debut in the revival of a pair of plays being produced at the Garden Theatre: Cyrano de Bergerac and Beau Brummell. Over the next thirty years he appeared in dozens of plays on The Great White Way. He was in the original production of Du Barry, written, directed, and produced by David Belasco, which had a successful run in 1901–02. After appearing in several plays with short runs, he was in another successful play from 1904 to 1905, The College Widow, written by George Ade and directed by George Marion again at the Garden Theatre. In 1910 he appeared in the role of Marc Antony in a repertory production of Julius Caesar at the Garden. In 1913 he began a successful run of The Family Cupboard, by the Pulitzer Prize-winning playwright, Owen Davis, which ran until 1915. He starred in the musical Maytime, produced by Lee and J.J. Shubert, and written by Rida Johnson Young, who also wrote the words to music composed by Sigmund Romberg. The show ran for almost 500 performances at five theaters from 1917 to 1918. He followed this with another Young hit, Little Old New York, which ran during 1920 and 1921 at Plymouth Theatre. Other hits Wood appeared in included: Give and Take (1923), written by Aaron Hoffman; the 1924 John Henry Mears' production, Sweet Seventeen; the 1927 musical, Bye, Bye, Bonnie, which was also notable as the first Broadway role for Ruby Keeler; and The Good Fairy (1931–32), produced and directed by Gilbert Miller, and performed in the theater named after Miller's father, which also starred Helen Hayes. After another successful run in the musical-comedy Take a Chance at the Apollo Theatre which ran from 1932 to 1933, and starred Ethel Merman, Wood took a 25-year hiatus from the Broadway stage, and devoted his creative talents to Hollywood.

=== Broadway performances ===
(Per Internet Broadway Database)

- Beau Brummell (Nov 20, 1899 – Jan 13, 1900)
- Cyrano de Bergerac (Nov 20, 1899 – Jan 13, 1900)
- Twelve Months Later (Mar 26, 1900 – Apr 1900)
- Du Barry (Dec 25, 1901 – May 1902)
- Dorothy Vernon of Haddon Hall (Dec 14, 1903 – Jan 1904)
- The Triumph of Love (Feb 08, 1904 – Feb 08, 1904)
- Love's Pilgrimage (Apr 14, 1904 – Apr 14, 1904)
- The College Widow (Sep 20, 1904 - May 1905)
- Brown of Harvard (Feb 26, 1906 - May 1906)
- The Village Lawyer (Mar 02, 1908 - Mar 1908)
- A Woman of Impulse (Mar 01, 1909 - Mar 1909)
- The Bridge (Sep 04, 1909 - Oct 1909)
- Julius Caesar (Jan 17, 1910 - Apr 16, 1910)
- Mrs. Bumpstead-Leigh (Apr 03, 1911 - May 1911)
- The Greyhound (Feb 29, 1912 - Jun 1, 1912)
- The Family Cupboard (Aug 21, 1913 - Jun 1915)
- Poor Little Thing (Dec 22, 1914 - Jan 1915)
- The Rented Earl (Feb 08, 1915 - Feb 1915)
- Maytime (Aug 16, 1917 - Oct 19, 1918)
- Little Old New York (Sep 08, 1920 - Jun 1921)
- Marie Antoinette (Nov 22, 1921 - Nov 1921)
- Wild Oats Lane (Sep 06, 1922 - Sep 1922)
- Give and Take (Jan 15, 1923 - Jun 1923)
- The Wild Westcotts (Dec 24, 1923 - Jan 1924)
- Sweet Seventeen (Mar 17, 1924 - May 1924)
- Milgrim's Progress (Dec 22, 1924 - Feb 1925)
- Trelawny of the "Wells" (Jun 01, 1925 - Jun 07, 1925)
- The Half Naked Truth (Jun 07, 1926 - Jul 1926)
- Sandalwood (Sep 22, 1926 - Oct 1926)
- Bye, Bye, Bonnie (Jan 13, 1927 - Apr 30, 1927)
- Madame X (Jul 06, 1927 - Jul 1927)
- Gods of the Lightning (Oct 24, 1928 - Nov 1928)
- The Old Rascal (Mar 24, 1930 - May 1930)
- Marseilles (Nov 17, 1930 - Dec 1930)
- She Means Business (Jan 26, 1931 - Feb 1931)
- The Good Fairy (Nov 24, 1931 - Apr 1932)
- Take a Chance (Nov 26, 1932 - Jul 01, 1933)
- Jane Eyre (May 1, 1958 – Jun 14, 1958)

=== Film and television ===
At the end of 1933, Wood began work on his first film, with a supporting role in David Butler's comedy, Bottom's Up, starring Spencer Tracy. The following year he originated the role in talking pictures of Wopsle in Stuart Walker's 1934 production of Great Expectations. Over the next 20 years he appeared in over 125 films, mostly in smaller and supporting roles. In 1937 he appeared in a small role in Maytime, the sound version of the 1910s play in which he had starred. Other notable films in which he appeared include: Two Against the World (1936), starring Humphrey Bogart; the Abbott and Costello vehicle, Buck Privates (1941); Here Comes Mr. Jordan (1941), starring Robert Montgomery, Evelyn Keyes, and Claude Rains; Howard Hawk's 1941 classic, Sergeant York, starring Gary Cooper; and The Adventures of Mark Twain (1944), starring Fredric March.

== Late career and death ==
During the 1950s, Wood appeared in a handful of pictures, mostly B-films. During the early and mid-1950s Wood made guest appearances on several television series, including The Lone Ranger (1950–51), Fireside Theater (1952–53), and Topper (1954). His final screen performance was in a small role in That Certain Feeling (1956), starring Bob Hope, Eva Marie Saint, and George Sanders. In 1958 Wood returned to the Broadway stage with a supporting role in Jane Eyre, it was his final acting performance. Wood died on January 13, 1966, in the Woodland Hills area of Los Angeles, California.

== Filmography ==
(Per AFI database)

- The Fountain (1934) as de Greve (film debut)
- Bottoms Up (1934) as John Baldwin
- College Rhythm (1934) as George Collins, Second Tramp (uncredited)
- The Trumpet Blows (1934) as Senor Ramirez
- Great Expectations (1934) as Wopsle
- The President Vanishes (1934) as Roger Grant
- A Night at the Ritz (1935) as Board of Directors' Chairman (uncredited)
- The Wedding Night (1935) as Leland Heywood (uncredited)
- Dangerous (1935) as Elmont
- Special Agent (1935) as Federal Judge (uncredited)
- Love in Bloom (1935) as Rector (uncredited)
- Spring Tonic (1935) as Mr. Ingalls
- College Scandal (1935) as Dean Traynor
- The Great Impersonation (1935) as Lord Allison (uncredited)
- The Prisoner of Shark Island (1936) as Gen. Thomas Ewing
- Great Guy (1936) as Mayor
- Hearts in Bondage (1936) as Commodore David G. Farragut
- Pigskin Parade (1936) as Prof. Dutton (uncredited)
- Mariners of the Sky/Navy Born (1936) as Mr. Strickland
- Two in a Crowd (1936) as Banker Ralston
- Dracula's Daughter (1936) as Dr. Townsend (uncredited)
- Wedding Present (1936) as Willett
- Parole! (1936) as Parole Board Chairman (uncredited)
- Two Against the World (1936) as Malcolm Sims
- This Is My Affair (1937) as Henry Maxwell
- On the Avenue (1937) as Mr. Trivet
- Guns of the Pecos (1937) as Texas Governor
- West of Shanghai (1937) as Myron Galt (uncredited)
- Born Reckless (1937) as Mayor (uncredited)
- Dangerously Yours (1937) as Walter Chandler
- Ali Baba Goes to Town (1937) as Selim
- Submarine D-1 (1937) as Admiral on Battleship (uncredited)
- Maytime (1937) as Massilon (uncredited)
- Over the Goal (1937) as Dr. Marshall - Carlton President
- Mannequin (1937) as Rogers (uncredited)
- Married Before Breakfast (1937)
- The Beloved Brat (1938) as Mr. Butler (uncredited)
- Gold Is Where You Find It (1938) as Judge H.B. Clayburn (uncredited)
- Kentucky (1938) as Race Track Patron (uncredited)
- Three Loves Has Nancy (1938) as Mr. Hanson (uncredited)
- Sergeant Murphy (1938) as Major General Truson (uncredited)
- I Am the Law (1938) as District Attorney Bert Berry
- Eternally Yours (1939)
- Juarez (1939) as Mr. Hartman (uncredited)
- They All Come Out (1939) as First Doctor (uncredited)
- 20,000 Men a Year (1939) as Crandall
- Off the Record (1939) as J.W.
- It Could Happen to You (1939) as Alumni Member (uncredited)
- East Side of Heaven (1939) as Fisher (uncredited)
- Waterloo Bridge (1940) as Vicar at Estate Dance (uncredited)
- Babies for Sale (1940) as Dr. Aleshire
- The Man Who Talked Too Much (1940) as Judge D.R. Rowan (uncredited)
- Dr. Ehrlich's Magic Bullet (1940) as Speidler
- Teddy the Rough Rider (1940, Short) as President William McKinley (uncredited)
- Private Affairs (1940) as Mr. Stanley
- The Man Who Wouldn't Talk (1940) as Walker
- Boom Town as Oil Man at New York Meeting (uncredited)
- Blossoms in the Dust (1941) as President of Texas Senate (uncredited)
- Buck Privates (1941) as Randolph Parker II (uncredited)
- Glamour Boy (1941) as Psychiatrist (uncredited)
- H. M. Pulham, Esq. (1941) as Mr. Bullard
- Here Comes Mr. Jordan (1941) as Board Member (uncredited)
- Honky Tonk (1941) as Gov. Wilson
- In the Navy (1941) as Admiral (uncredited)
- Million Dollar Baby (1941) as Mr. Barlow, Attorney (uncredited)
- She Knew All the Answers (1941) as Minor Role (uncredited)
- Love Crazy (1941) as Sanity Hearing Doctor (uncredited)
- Sergeant York (1941) as Major Hylan (uncredited)
- Small Town Deb (1942) as Eustace R. Richards
- Blondie's Blessed Event (1942)
- Murder in the Big House (1942) as Bill Burgen
- Parachute Nurse (1942) as Maj. Devon
- They All Kissed the Bride (1942) as Hoover (uncredited)
- We Were Dancing (1942) as Colonel Sandys (uncredited)
- Stand by for Action (1942) as Sen. Masterman (uncredited)
- Crazy House (1943) as Studio Bidder (uncredited)
- The Good Fellows (1943) as John Drayton
- Hers to Hold (1943) as Peter Cartwright
- It's a Great Life (1943) as Insurance Physician (uncredited)
- The More the Merrier (1943) as Senator in Taxi (uncredited)
- Never a Dull Moment (1943) as Commodore Barclay
- She's for Me (1943) as Milbourne
- What a Woman! (1943) as Dean Alfred B. Shaeffer
- The Amazing Mrs. Holliday (1943) as Chairman (uncredited)
- I'm from Arkansas (1944) as Governor of Arkansas
- Meet Miss Bobby Socks (1944) as Principal Whitaker (uncredited)
- They Live in Fear (1944) as John Elwood (uncredited)
- Phantom Lady (1944) as Show Backer (uncredited)
- The Adventures of Mark Twain (1944) as William Dean Howells (uncredited)
- The Big Show-Off (1945) as Dr. Dinwiddle
- Boston Blackie Booked on Suspicion (1945) as Alexander Harmon (uncredited)
- Eadie Was a Lady (1945) as Dean Flint (uncredited)
- Patrick the Great (1945) as Sir Orville Armstrong (uncredited)
- The Stork Club (1945) as Dr. Marston (uncredited)
- One Way to Love (1946) as Dignified Man (uncredited)
- Because of Him (1946) as Samual Hapgood
- Cinderella Jones (1946) as Professor Seabright (uncredited)
- Do You Love Me (1946) as Dr. Dunfee (uncredited)
- Dragonwyck (1946) as Mayor Curtis (uncredited)
- The Missing Lady (1946) as Alfred Kester (uncredited)
- Night Editor (1946) as Bank Manager (uncredited)
- Tomorrow Is Forever (1946) as Charles Hamilton (uncredited)
- Blondie's Big Moment (1947) as Theodore Payson (uncredited)
- The Fabulous Texan (1947) as Hamilton (uncredited)
- Fun on a Weekend (1947) as John Durand - Hotel Manager (uncredited)
- Her Husband's Affairs (1947) as Tappel (uncredited)
- It Had to Be You (1947) as Mr. Kimberly (uncredited)
- Little Miss Broadway (1947) as Richard Nichols Sr.
- My Wild Irish Rose (1947) as Rawson - Three Tycoons
- Two Blondes and a Redhead (1947) as Judge Abbott
- Welcome Stranger (1947) as Principal Tilson (uncredited)
- The Senator Was Indiscreet (1947) as University President
- I Surrender Dear (1948) as R.H. Collins
- The Judge Steps Out (1948) as Cabot Royce Winthrop (uncredited)
- An Old-Fashioned Girl (1949) as Mr. Shaw
- Adventure in Baltimore (1949) as Coates - Art Contest Director (uncredited)
- Shamrock Hill (1949) as Judge Mayer
- Streets of San Francisco (1949) as Mayor Bollen (uncredited)
- Border Outlaws (1950) as Rancher Kimball
- Harriet Craig (1950) as Mr. Norwood (uncredited)
- The Long Ranger (1950–1951, TV) as Ed Simpson/Cyrus Wilson
- The Petty Girl (1950) as Prof. Stratton (uncredited)
- Rhubarb (1951) as Mr. Carroll - Board Member (uncredited)
- Cattle Queen (1951) as Judge Whipple, Bartender
- Francis Covers the Big Town (1953) as Dr. Glosser (uncredited)
- Topper (1953–1954, TV) as Sudbury/Judge
- No Man's Land (1955) as Philip Grant
- That Certain Feeling (1956) as Senator (final film) (uncredited)
