= Maytime =

Maytime may refer to:

- Maytime (musical), a 1917 Broadway production
- Maytime (1923 film), starring Ethel Shannon, based on the musical
- Maytime (1926 film), a 1926 German silent romance film
- Maytime (1937 film), a 1937 MGM musical romance, remake of the 1923 movie
- Empire Maytime, one of a series of Empire ships employed by the British government
- "Meienzît" ("May Time"), song by 13th-century German minnesinger Neidhart von Reuental
