= Maytime (1923 film) =

1923 film by Louis J. Gasnier

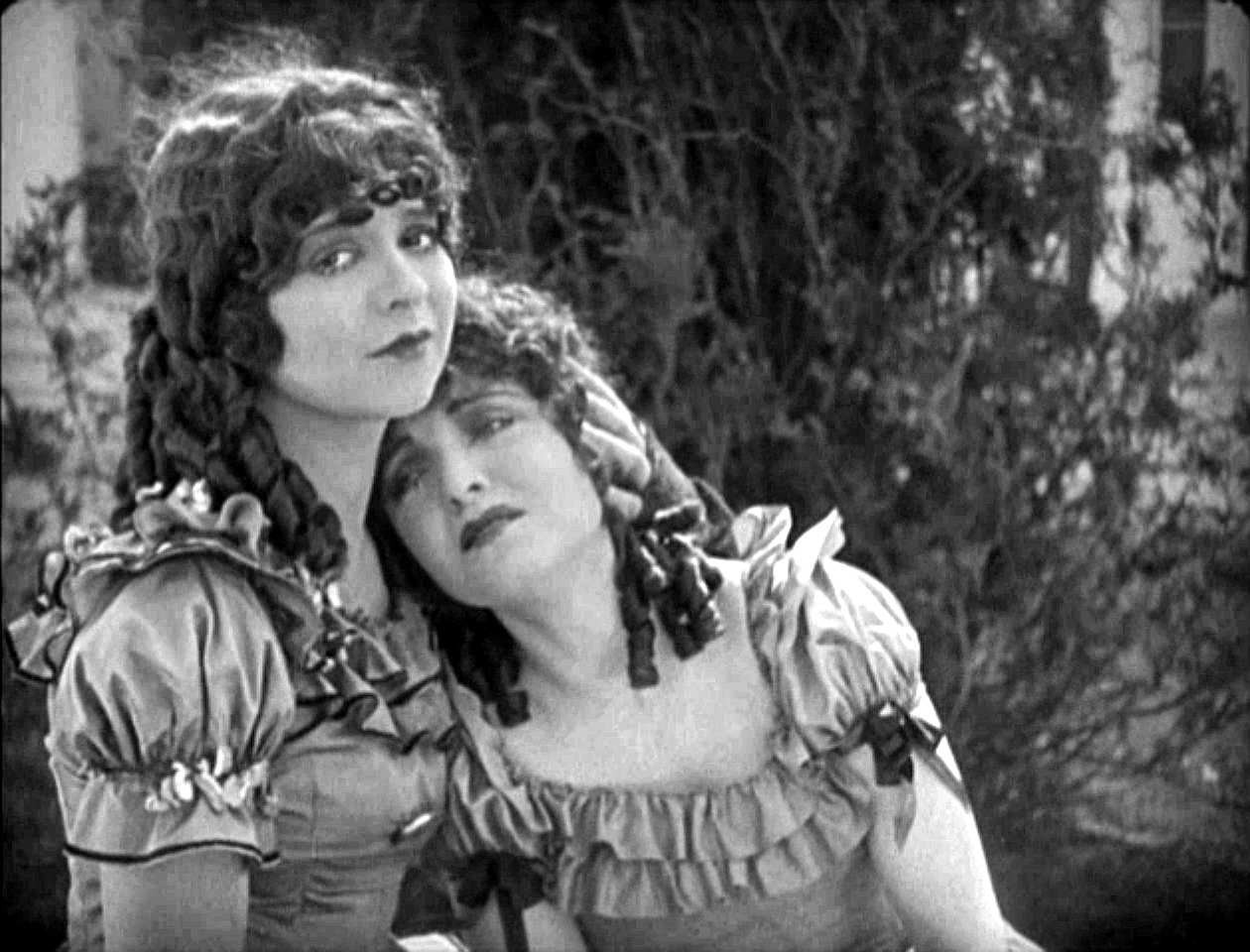
- Clara Bow and Ethel Shannon
- Directed by: Louis J. Gasnier
- Written by: Olga Printzlau (adaptation); Rudolf Bernauer; Rudolph Schanzer
- Based on: Maytime; 1917 musical by Cyrus Wood; Rida Johnson Young
- Produced by: B. P. Schulberg
- Starring: Ethel Shannon; Harrison Ford; William Norris
- Cinematography: Karl Struss
- Music by: Sigmund Romberg
- Production company: B.P. Schulberg Productions
- Distributed by: Preferred Pictures
- Release date: November 16, 1923
- Running time: 80 minutes
- Country: United States
- Language: Silent (English intertitles)

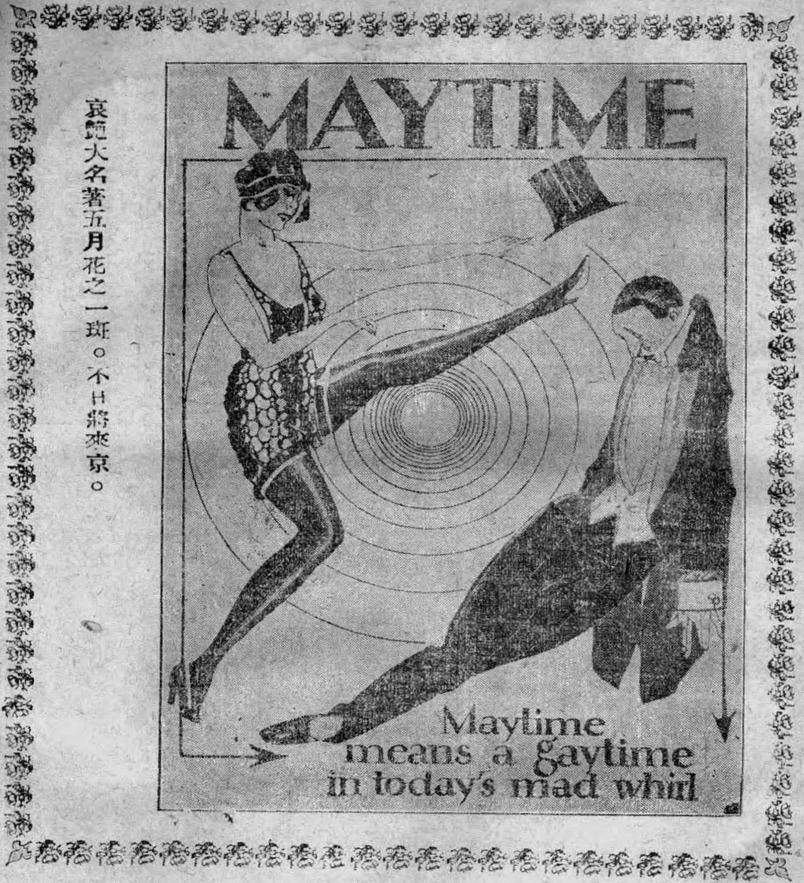
Bilingual ad in the Chinese language Screen Weekly (January 1925)

Maytime is a 1923 American silent romantic drama film directed by Louis J. Gasnier and starring Ethel Shannon, Harrison Ford, and William Norris. The film also features one of Clara Bow's earliest cinema roles. The film is based on the musical of the same name composed by Sigmund Romberg with a book by Rida Johnson Young. A different film with the same name was made in 1937 also based on the musical.

== Plot ==
Ottilie Van Zandt is forced to wed her cousin, despite her love for Richard Wayne, the gardener's son. Richard leaves, vowing to return a wealthy man and eligible suitor for her. He returns to find she has already married and, in turn, marries another girl on impulse. Two generations later, the grandchildren of Ottilie and Richard, who both have inherited their names as well, meet and develop a close friendship that culminates in the romance that their grandparents began but could not consummate years before.

== Cast ==
- Ethel Shannon as Ottilie Van Zandt
- Harrison Ford as Richard Wayne
- William Norris as Matthew
- Clara Bow as Alice Tremaine
- Wallace MacDonald as Claude Van Zandt
- Josef Swickard as Colonel Van Zandt
- Martha Mattox as Mathilda
- Betty Francisco as Ermintrude
- Robert McKim as Monte Mitchell
- Julie Bishop as Little Girl (credited as Jacqueline Wells)
- Pat Wing as Little Girl (credited as Madison Wing)
- Louise Emmons as Gypsy Fortune Teller (uncredited)
- Maxine Tabnac as Child (uncredited)
- Edna Tichenor as Cleo (uncredited)
- Bess True as Society Lady (uncredited)
- Hortense O'Brien as Bit Role (uncredited)

== Preservation ==
Once considered to be a lost film, an incomplete print of the film was found in 2009 in the New Zealand Film Archive and underwent restoration. Four out of the original seven reels had survived. The preserved film is available for viewing on the website of the National Film Preservation Foundation. The movie is in the public domain.
