= Gypsy Love (operetta) =

Operetta by Franz Lehár (music), Alfred Willner and Robert Bodanzky (libretto)

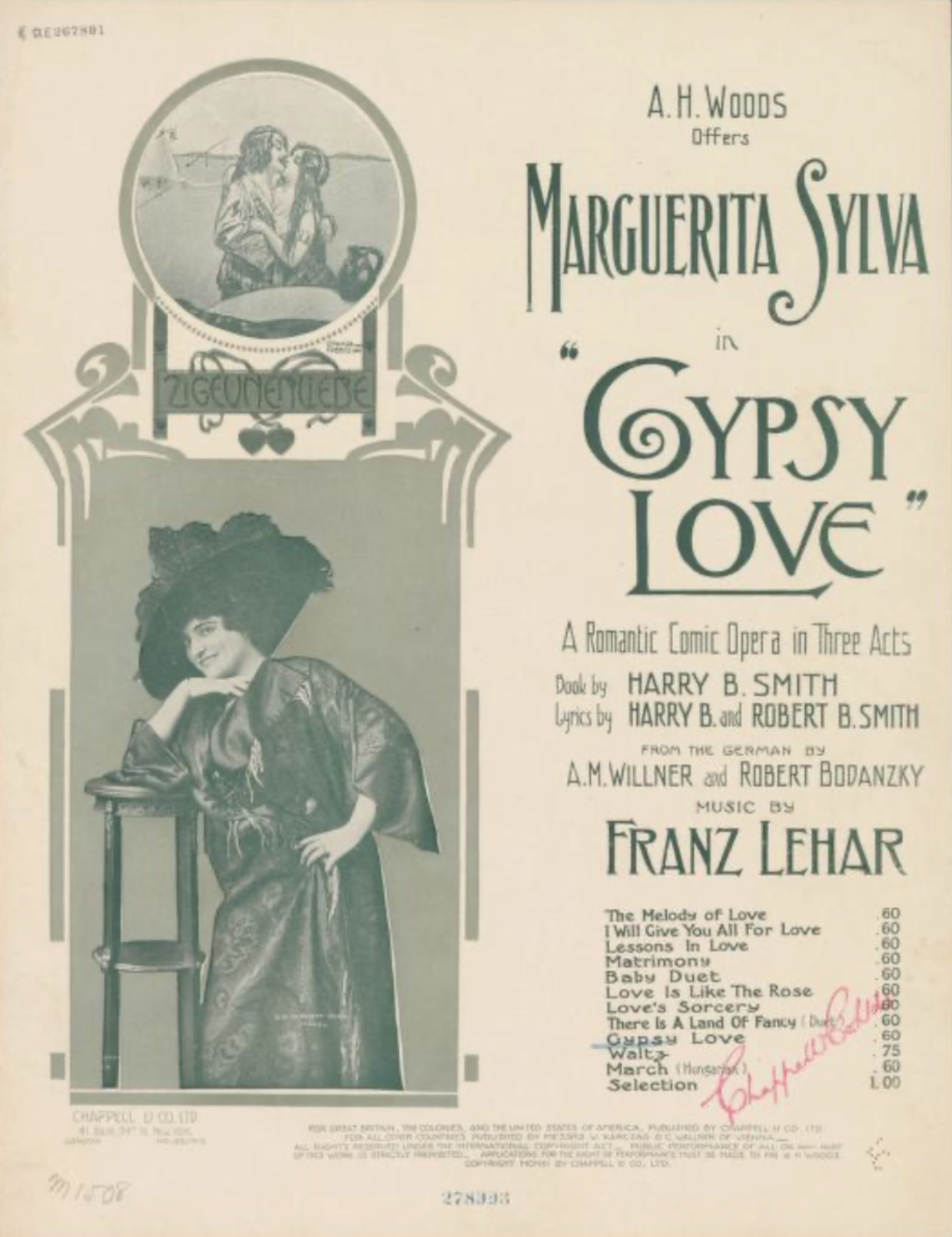
1911 sheet music cover for Gypsy Love, showing Marguerita Sylva who starred on Broadway

Gypsy Love, sometimes spelled Gipsy Love, (German: Zigeunerliebe) is an operetta in three acts by Franz Lehár with a German-language libretto by Alfred Willner and Robert Bodanzky. Premiered in Vienna in 1910, the operetta's plot centres on the daughter of a Romanian landowner who is engaged to a young nobleman but is attracted to a Romani violinist, her intended's half-brother; complications ensue at her engagement party, and she sees her future in a dream. The brooding, romantic story is accompanied by a score that focuses on dance music.

Gypsy Love has been translated into various languages. In 1910 the operetta had its first performance outside Austria in Budapest in Hungarian. The piece continues to be played regularly in Eastern Europe. In 1911 a production toured France in a French translation by Henry Gauthier-Villars and Jean Bénédict. A. H. Woods produced an English version using a libretto and lyrics by Harry B. Smith and Robert B. Smith that had a short Broadway run in 1911 before touring the United States into 1913. This production made a star of the actor and tenor Arthur Albro as the gypsy violinist. Albro starred in varying productions of Gypsy Love in the United States into the early 1920s; most of them produced by Andreas Dippel.

George Edwardes produced the piece as Gipsy Love in 1912, in London, with a new English libretto by Basil Hood and lyrics by Adrian Ross. The plot bore little resemblance to the original story. With the aid of Lehar, the score was vastly modified with many songs removed entirely, others reassigned to different characters, and several new songs added in the style of Edwardian musical comedy. The resulting work contained only superficial similarities to the original operetta. It had a run of 299 performances in London in 1912 and toured in Britain the following year. In 1914 this version toured Australia produced by J. C. Williamson.

== Synopsis ==
=== Act I ===
Zorika is the daughter of a wealthy farmer from Transylvania, near the Cerna River. In the forest, she contemplates her wedding, to take place that evening, to the young nobleman, Jonel Bolescu. The marriage would make her father very happy. She does not feel love for Jonel, but she is attracted to his half-brother, Joszi, the violinist son of Jonel's father and a gypsy mother. Joszi triggers longings in Zorika to escape to a free, unfettered world of exciting passions. Joszi has promised to play at the wedding, although he is jealous of Jonel. Zorika's nurse warns Joszi not to start a fight at the wedding. She also tells him that Zorika is an "enchanted girl", baptized in the waters of the Cerna and under the care of the spirits of the river, and that if she drank from the river, she would know her whole future.

Zorika's father, Pyotr Dragotin, prepares a grand wedding party. He also hopes to marry his beautiful neighbor, Countess Ilona (though she has eyes for Joszi), while his sixteen-year-old niece Jolanta hopes to marry the mayor's son, Kajetan. The wedding guests and the Jonel arrive at the house. Jonel sings a love to his beloved, her a bouquet of roses. Zorika, still unable to decide, throws the roses into the Cerna, upsetting Jonel and the guests. Dragotin orders his daughter to kiss Jonel. Ilona argues that Zorika should decide for herself if she wishes to marry, and Joszi also protests. Although Joszi is persuaded to leave, the atmosphere is deteriorating. Meanwhile, Jolanta keeps Kajetan close to her and presses the embarrassed boy to kiss her and confess his love. Ilona comes to the aid of the clumsy Kajetan by giving him a kissing lesson.

Zorika sneaks out of the party and meets Joszi. She asks him to prepare some horses. At dawn, she wants to escape with him and the gypsies. She remembers the prophecy that her nurse told her about and goes to the banks of the Cerna. She drinks water from it and falls asleep.

=== Act II ===
In her dream, Zorika and Joszi have joined the gypsies and traveled for two years; now they have returned to their homeland and are staying at Michał's inn. Although she does not complain about her fate, Zorika cries at night. Joszi has not offered to marry her. He often looks at other gypsy girls and spends his time with his friends. Countess Ilona throws a big party and looks for entertainment for the evening. Zorika offers to stage a gypsy wedding in front of the guests. Everyone agrees, and Zorika sends Michał to get a real priest, hoping that Joszi will finally take her as his wife.

Guests arrive: Dragotin has been unable to persuade Ilona to marry him, because she still has designs on Joszi. Jolanta with Kajetan are married; she is a dominating wife, and they already have two children. Ilona asks Joszi if he plans to marry Zorika, but he avoids answering. Zorika realizes that Joszi no longer loves her, although she has sacrificed her home, father and fiancé for him. She remembers the song that Jonel once sang to her, portraying gypsy love as fleeting compared with the love of a good man.

The gypsy wedding begins. Among the guests, Zorika notices her father, but Dragotin will not recognize her, saying that he has no daughter among the gypsies. Joszi makes her dance and sing for the guests. He tells her openly that he will not marry her before a priest.

=== Act III ===
Zorika sleeps by the waters of the Cerna as the wedding preparations continue. Jonel finds her sleeping and sings her a song about a wild rose. Wedding preparations have continued. Jolanta finally induces Kajetan to propose. Dragotin gives them his blessing for the sake of peace and quiet. Ilona, on the other hand, evades his efforts, preferring to remain alone. Joszi hurries to the camps, because at dawn the gypsies are to continue their travels. Ilona is disappointed that Joszi is leaving, but she gives makes a generous gift of gold coins to him.

Zorika awakens, and Jonel is there waiting for her. She knows where her true love and happiness are. The Cerna's good spirits have warned her against the reckless gypsy love. With full conviction, she tells Jonel that she loves him.

== Productions ==
=== Non-English language productions ===
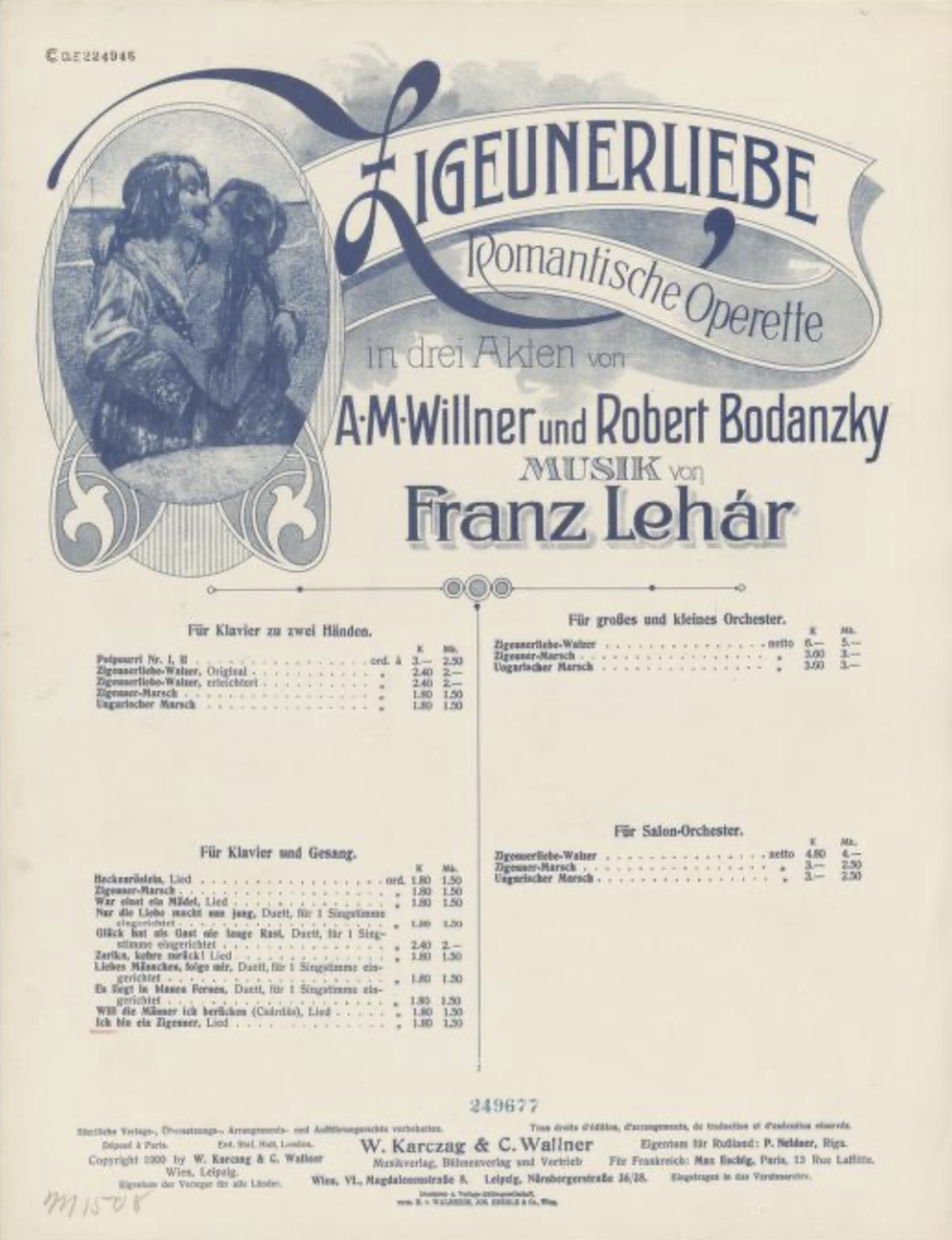
1910 sheet music cover for Zigeunerliebe

The original production, Zigeunerliebe, premiered at the Carltheater, Vienna, in German, on 8 January 1910. The cast included Grete Holm as Zorika, Willi Strehl as Józsi, Max Rohr as Jonel Bolescu, Karl Blasel as Peter Dragotin, Mizzi Zwerenz as Ilona von Körösháza, Littl Koppel as Jolán, and Hubert Marischka as Kajetán Dimetreanu. A success in Vienna, the production ran for a total of 232 performances over a ten month period, and it was frequently revived at the Carltheater into the late 1920s. The Carltheater toured the Vienna production to Paris, which inspired the creation of a French version, Amour Tzigane (translation by Henry Gauthier-Villars and Jean Bénédict). This version toured France with great success in 1911.

The first staging outside of Austria was in Budapest, where it was a success at the Király Színház in a Hungarian translation, Cigányszerelem, from 1910 to 1911. The piece continues to be played in Eastern Europe and has remained a part of the standard repertory at the Budapest Operetta Theatre. In Germany the operetta was first performed on February 12, 1911 at the Komische Oper Berlin with Martha Winternitz-Dorda as Zorika and Jean Nadolovitch as Józsi.

During the era of Nazi Germany, the operetta was given at the Theater des Volkes in Berlin with a cast led by Ingeborg Dörlein and Hans-Heinz Bollmann. More recent German revivals include a 2011 staging at the Leipzig Opera, a 2015 production at the Anhaltisches Theater in Dessau with Angelina Ruzzafante as Zorika; and a 2019 production at the Sommerarena Baden. Recent performances in Hungary include a 2021 production at the Rátonyi Róbert Theater in Csákvár.

=== English language productions ===
==== A. H. Woods' Gypsy Love ====
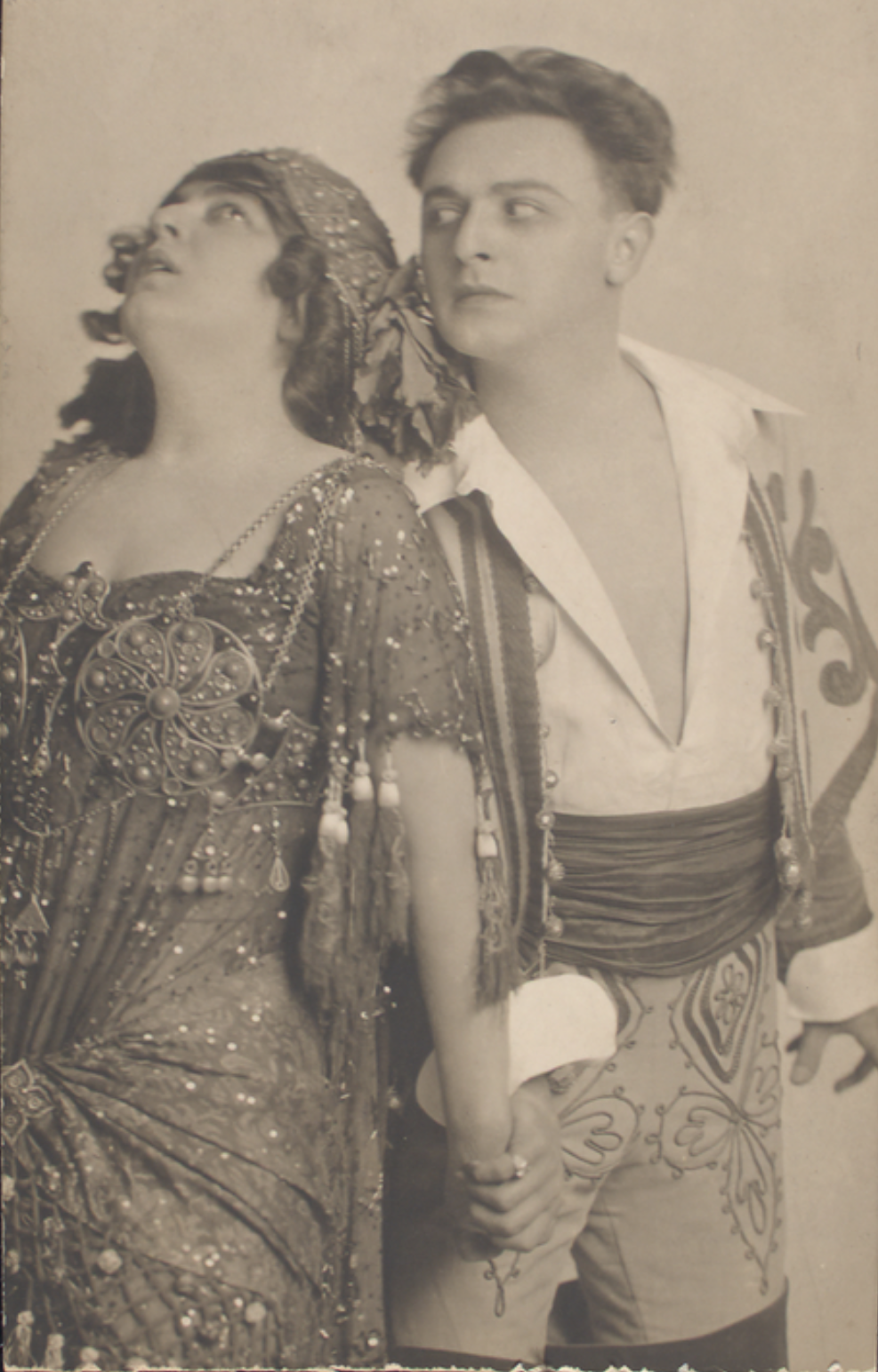
Photograph of Albro as Jozsi. The actress playing Zorika is unidentified. (Note: The actress appearing as Zorika may be Sylva, but other possibilities include Phyllis Partington or Finita de Soria, who portrayed Zorika on tour.)

The United States debut was produced by A. H. Woods at the Forrest Theatre in Philadelphia on 2 October 1911. It was the first English-language production of the operetta, and it was performed under the title Gypsy Love using a libretto and lyrics by Harry B. Smith and Robert B. Smith. The Philadelphia Inquirer praised the stars of the production, Marguerita Sylva (Zorika) and Arthur Albro (Jozsi); especially their singing. However, the paper was critical of the show's plot; dismissing the libretto as "incredibly unlikely and dull". The reviewer also praised the sets and costumes as "richly produced" by Woods and thought the score was "masterful", but argued that the contemporary trend towards Viennese operetta on the American stage had grown tired and that the production was unlikely to have a sustained run.

The production transferred to the Globe Theatre on Broadway, where it opened on 17 October 1911 under less than ideal circumstances. Sylva was ill and was unable to continue the show after first act, in which she mostly spoke instead of sang; she was replaced in the second act by her understudy, Phyllis Partington. In its review, The New York Sun stated that Sylva was possibly the "most angry woman in New York" as her understudy was given "what amounted to an ovation". On top of this, critical reviews were highly laudatory of Albro's performance; with theatre historian Dan Dietz stating: "Arthur Albro all but stole the show with his voice and good looks." The New York Times review stated, "Of the other members of the cast Albert Albro as the gypsy made the most pronounced impression. He was the figure to the life and he danced and sang with a Hungarian abandon which would have been very infectious under ordinary circumstances." While Sylva recovered and was able to return to the role in good voice, poor reviews of her performance from opening night led to a lack of interest from the New York public, and the work was a failure on Broadway; closing after just 31 performances on 11 November 1911.

The production then began a lengthy tour of the United States ran as late as February 1913 when it was playing in Los Angeles at the Mason Opera House with Partington and Albro still in the cast. The tour then preceded on for further performances in Canada in March 1913. Albro continued to perform with regularity in revivals of Gypsy Love in the United States into the early 1920s. These included a 1917 touring production in New England, including Vermont, Connecticut, and Massachusetts; and a 1920 production in Chicago at the Auditorium Theatre. Both the tour and Chicago run were produced by Andreas Dippel.

==== George Edwardes' Gipsy Love ====
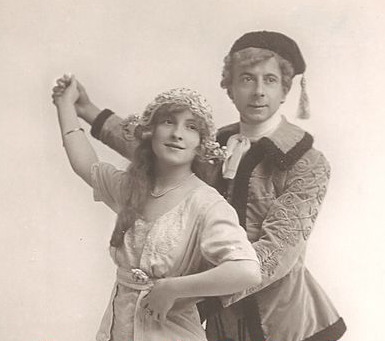
Daisy Burrell with William "Billy" Spray in the English touring production of 1913

Another English translation and adaptation with a libretto by Basil Hood and lyrics by Adrian Ross, titled Gipsy Love, was written for a London production at Daly's Theatre produced by George Edwardes. The story was heavily modified; abandoning the original central conceit of the fantastical dream, Hood reset the story in concrete reality. Zorika was renamed Ilona, and the part of Ilona von Körösháza was replaced entirely with a new character, Lady Babby, created for Gertie Millar. Edward Royce directed and choreographed the show. In April 1912 Lehar was in London helping to prepare this revised work for the stage. According to Kurt Gänzl, "the score was torn apart" with several musical numbers being heavily modified, cut, or reassigned to different roles. New pieces were added in the style of Edwardian musical comedy, and in the end the production was vastly different and had only a superficial relationship to the original Zigeunerliebe. The show opened on 1 June 1912 with Hungarian operetta star Sári Petráss as Ilona. Others in the cast included, besides Gertie Millar, Robert Michaelis as Jozsi, Webster Millar as Jonel, W. H. Berry as Dragotin, Lauri de Frece as Kajetan, Fred Kaye as Dimetreanu, Mabel Russell as Jolan, Harry Dearth as Andor, Madeline Seymour as Zorika, Kate Welch as Marischka, and Rosina Filippi as Julesa. The piece was a success in London, running for 299 performances and then touring Great Britain in 1913.

J. C. Williamson mounted Gipsy Love in Australia in a production starring English musical comedy actress Gertrude Glyn as Lady Babby and English soprano Elsie Spain as Ilona. It played in theaters in Sydney, Brisbane, and Melbourne in 1914. The production's music director, Andrew MacCunn, dedicated the "Ilona Tango", which he wrote for the production, to Spain.

== Adaptations ==
Film adaptations include The Rogue Song (1930), which used part of the score but had a new story by John Colton and Frances Marion.

In 1974 Unitel GmbH & Co. KG made an adaptation for television in Germany which starred American soprano Janet Perry as Zorika and Romanian tenor Ion Buzea (given in German as Jon Buzea) as Jozsi.

== Notes and references ==
=== Bibliography ===
- Dietz, Dan (2021). "Gypsy Love". The Complete Book of 1910s Broadway Musicals. Rowman & Littlefield Publishers. ISBN 9781538150283.
- Gänzl, Kurt (2001). "Zigeunerliebe". The Encyclopedia of the Musical Theatre, Second Edition. Vol. III. Schirmer Books. ISBN 9780028655741.
- Scott, Derek B. (2019). German Operetta on Broadway and in the West End, 1900–1940. Cambridge University Press. ISBN 9781108484589.
- Traubner, Richard (2004). Operetta: A Theatrical History. London: Routledge. ISBN 1135887837.
