= Az obsitos =

Operetta by Emmerich Kálmán

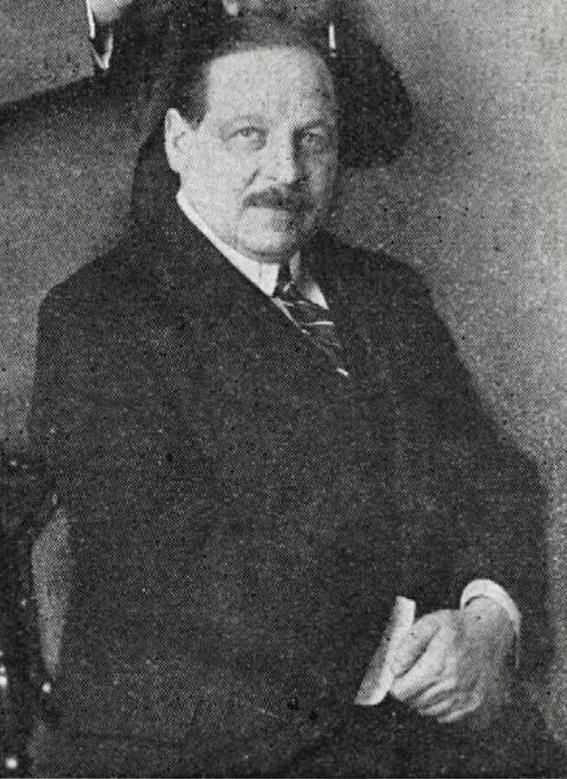
Emmerich Kálmán

Az obsitos (The Soldier on Leave) is an operetta by Emmerich Kálmán. It has been performed under many different names.

== Performance history and versions ==
The first version, in Hungarian, with a libretto by Károly von Bakonyi, premiered at the Vígszínház, Budapest, on 16 March 1910.

The second, German version, Der gute Kamerad (The good comrade), with a libretto revised by Viktor Léon, premiered at the Bürgertheater, Vienna, on 10 October 1911. The location of the operetta was changed from Hungary to Austria. The main roles were sung by Betty Fischer, Louise Kartousch, Hubert Marischka and Ernst Tautenhayn.

The third, more nationalistic, version, Gold gab ich für Eisen (I Gave Gold for Iron) was premiered at the Theater an der Wien on 16 October 1914. This was adapted, with additional music by Sigmund Romberg and words by Rida Johnson Young, as Her Soldier Boy which was first produced at the Chicago Theatre in Chicago where it opened on April 11, 1916 with a cast led by Margaret Romaine as Marlene Delaunay and Arthur Albro as Alain Tenters. The work was later staged on Broadway, at the Astor Theatre, from 6 December 1916 to 26 May 1917, and as Soldier Boy at the Apollo Theatre, Shaftesbury Avenue, Westminster, in 1918.

A version produced by Ohio Light Opera in Wooster, Ohio, 2005 was called A Soldier's Promise. This was based on Der gute Kamerad. It was recorded as a DVD.

== Roles ==
Role	Voice type	Premiere cast, 16 March 1910 (Conductor: – )
Karoline		
Marlene, her daughter		
Alwin, friend of Karoline's son, Franz		

== Synopsis ==
Karoline and her daughter Marlene do not know that their long-absent son and brother Franz has been killed in the war. Franz's soldier friend Alwin goes to tell them the news, but in the event, he can't bring himself to tell them the truth and introduces himself as Franz, whom they haven’t seen in many years. But things grow difficult when Alwin finds himself falling in love with his “sister”.
