= Bliss Milford =

American actress and singer (1886–1970)

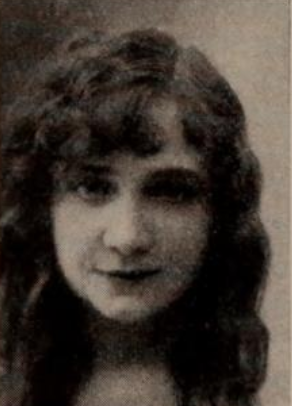
- Bliss Milford, from a 1915 publication
- Born: Bliss Phoebe MacLaren; April 9, 1886; Hope, North Dakota, US
- Died: July 29, 1970 (aged 84); Bronx, New York
- Resting place: Ferncliff Cemetery
- Occupations: Actress, screenwriter, songwriter
- Spouse(s): Karl Klein; Harry Beaumont (div.); David Higgins (div.)
- Relatives: William Edward McLaren (uncle)

Bliss Milford (born Bliss Phoebe MacLaren; April 9, 1886 – July 29, 1970) was an American actress, screenwriter, songwriter and singer who was active in Hollywood during the silent era.

== Biography ==
Bliss McLaren was born in Hope, North Dakota, to attorney C. Milford MacLaren and actress Alma Gallinger. She grew up primarily in Chicago, and became interested in acting when her family relocated to New York City later on;. Her uncle, William Edward McLaren, was the archbishop of Chicago.

When she became an actress at the age of 15 — appearing, at first, in minor roles on the stage in New York — she used her father's middle name as her last name for her film credits. She was under contract at Edison until 1914, at which point she moved to Kinetophone.

She joined the company of actor and playwright David Higgins in the early 1900s, alongside her mother. Higgins and Bliss eventually married, despite their nearly 30-year age gap, but their partnership did not last. Her 1915 marriage to filmmaker Harry Beaumont was similarly fated. She eventually married Karl Klein in 1923, a marriage that lasted until Klein's death in the 1960s.

In addition to her work as an actress, screenwriter, and songwriter, she also served for a time on the board of directors of the Toledo School for Crippled Children.

Little is known of her life after her film career came to an end. In addition to songwriting, she apparently sang contralto at a 1928 Washington D.C. opera recital. She died July 29, 1970, in the Bronx and was cremated. Her ashes rest at Ferncliff Cemetery, Hartsdale, New York.

== Select filmography ==
- 1918 Sylvia on a Spree
- 1918 And the Children Pay
- 1918 Flower of the Dusk
- 1916 The House of Mirrors
- 1915 The Beloved Vagabond
- 1915 The Closing Net
- 1914 A Question of Hats and Gowns
