= The Little Boss =

1919 silent film by David Smith

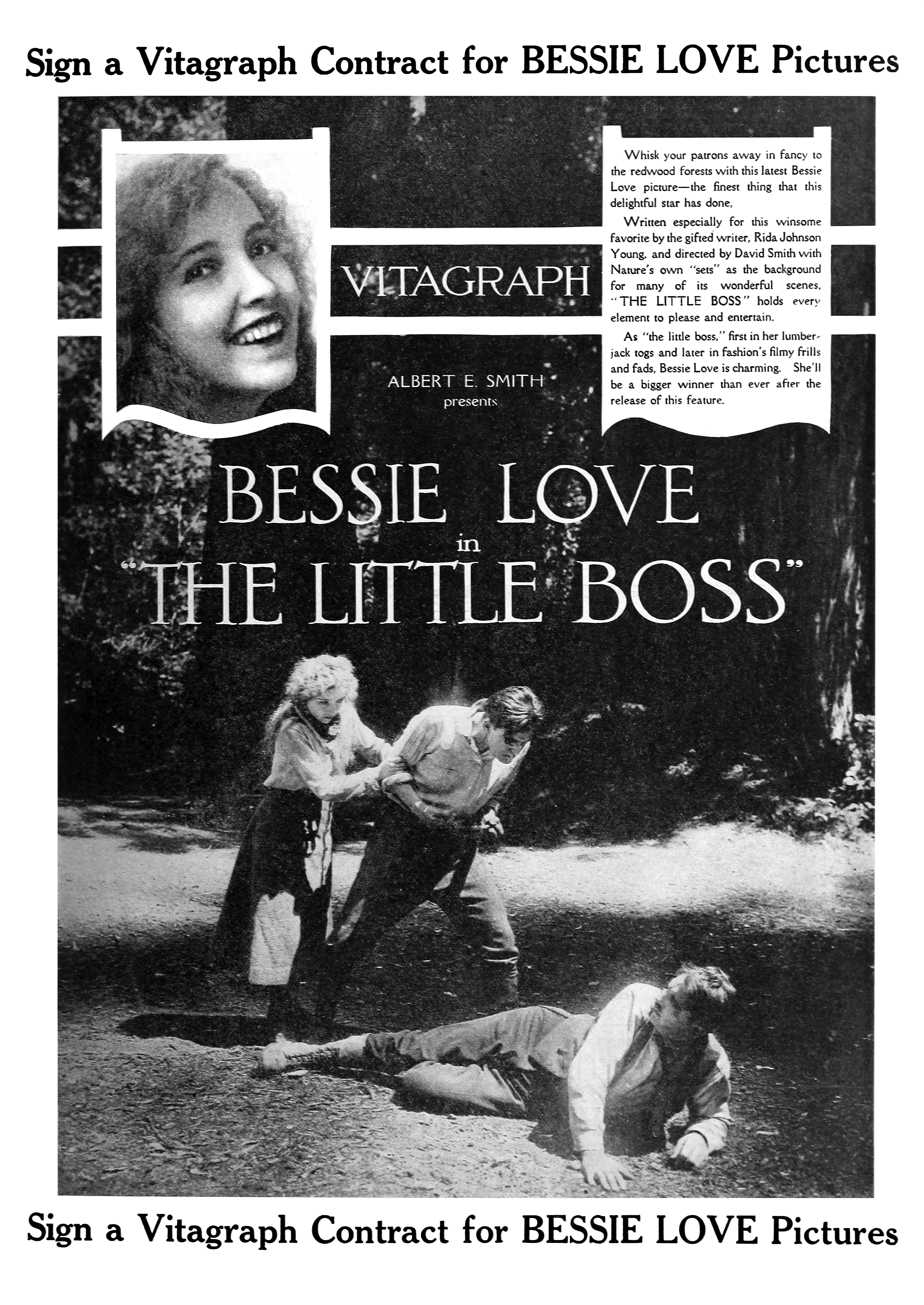
- Magazine advertisement
- Directed by: David Smith
- Screenplay by: Rida Johnson Young
- Story by: Rida Johnson Young
- Starring: Bessie Love; Wallace MacDonald
- Cinematography: Clyde De Vinna
- Production company: Vitagraph Studios
- Release date: June 2, 1919 (U.S.)
- Running time: 5 reels
- Country: United States
- Language: Silent (English intertitles)

The Little Boss is a 1919 American silent romantic comedy film directed by David Smith and produced by Vitagraph Studios. The story and screenplay were by Rida Johnson Young, and it starred Bessie Love and Wallace MacDonald.

The film is presumed lost.

== Plot ==
Peggy is the owner of a lumber camp, and she falls for Clayton, a man from the city, who comes to the camp. Clayton's sister invites Peggy to come to the city, where she attends school and becomes a "modern woman." When Peggy returns to the camp, it is revealed that she was never the true owner of the lumber camp, but this does not matter to Clayton, who is in love with her.

== Cast ==
- Bessie Love as Peggy, The Little Boss
- Wallace MacDonald as Clayton Hargis
- Otto Lederer as Sandy MacNab
- Harry Russell as "Red" O'Rourke
- J. Morley as Richard Leicester
- Joe Rickson as Pete Farley
- Clara Knight as Chloe
- Karl Formes as "Old" Farley

== Production ==
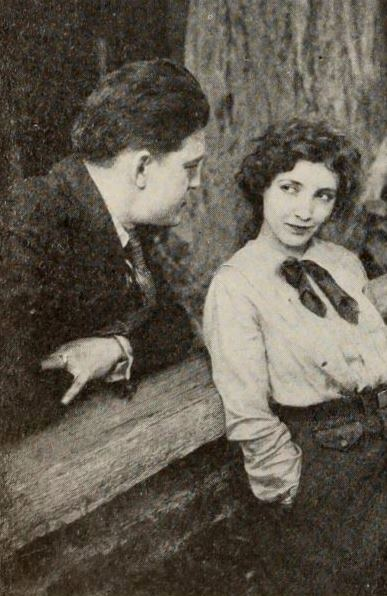
Unidentified actor (possibly Wallace MacDonald) and Bessie Love

Exterior scenes were filmed at the Little River Redwood Company, an actual lumber camp in Eureka, California. Scenes with log flumes were filmed in Fresno, California.

== Release ==
On its release, the film was shown with a Burton Holmes Travelogue and the comedy Taking a Chance in some theaters; The Heart Punch and The Little Widow were shown in others.

== Reception ==
Clyde De Vinna's photography of the redwood forests was highly praised, although the overall reception of the film was negative.
