= A Damsel in Distress (1919 film) =

1919 film directed by George Archainbaud

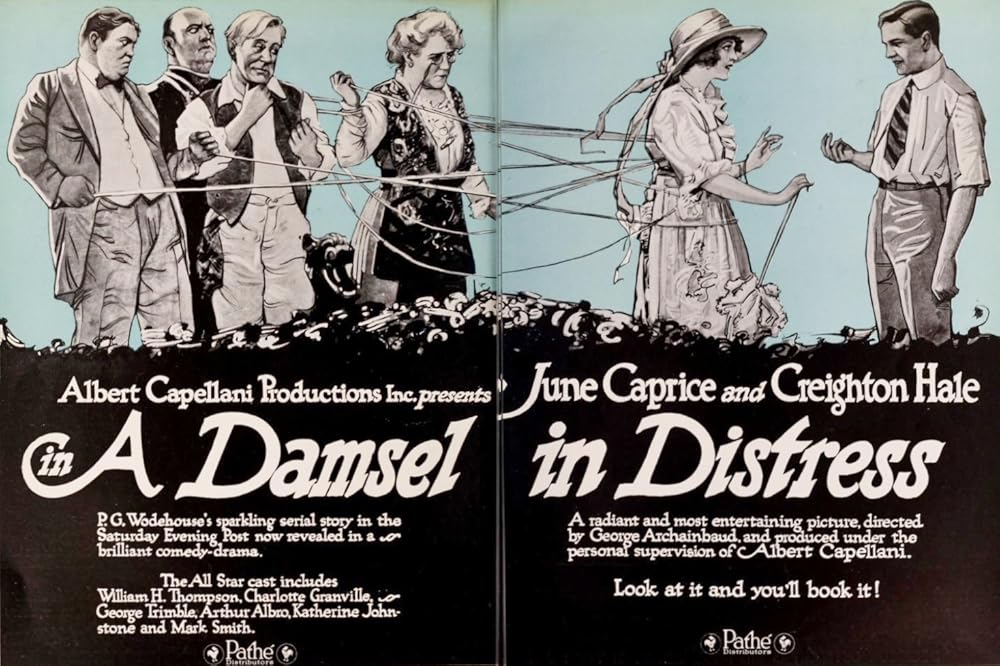
- Directed by: George Archainbaud
- Based on: A Damsel in Distress; 1919 novel by P. G. Wodehouse
- Produced by: Albert Capellani Productions, Inc.
- Starring: June Caprice
- Cinematography: Lucien Tainguy
- Distributed by: Pathé Exchange, Inc.
- Release date: 12 October 1919
- Running time: 5 reels
- Country: United States
- Language: Silent (English intertitles)

A Damsel in Distress is a silent romantic comedy film released in 1919, starring June Caprice and Creighton Hale. The film is based on the 1919 novel A Damsel in Distress by English humorist P. G. Wodehouse. The director was George Archainbaud. The same novel later inspired a 1937 film.

== Cast ==
- June Caprice as Maud Marsh
- Creighton Hale as George Bevan
- William H. Thompson as John W. Marsh
- Charlotte Granville as Mrs. Caroline Byng
- Arthur Albro as Reggie Byng
- George Trimble as Keggs
- Katherine Johnson as Alice Farraday
- Mark Smith as Percy Marsh

== Production ==
The film was directed by George Archainbaud, with Philip Masi as assistant director. The art director was Henri Menessier.
