= The Closing Net =

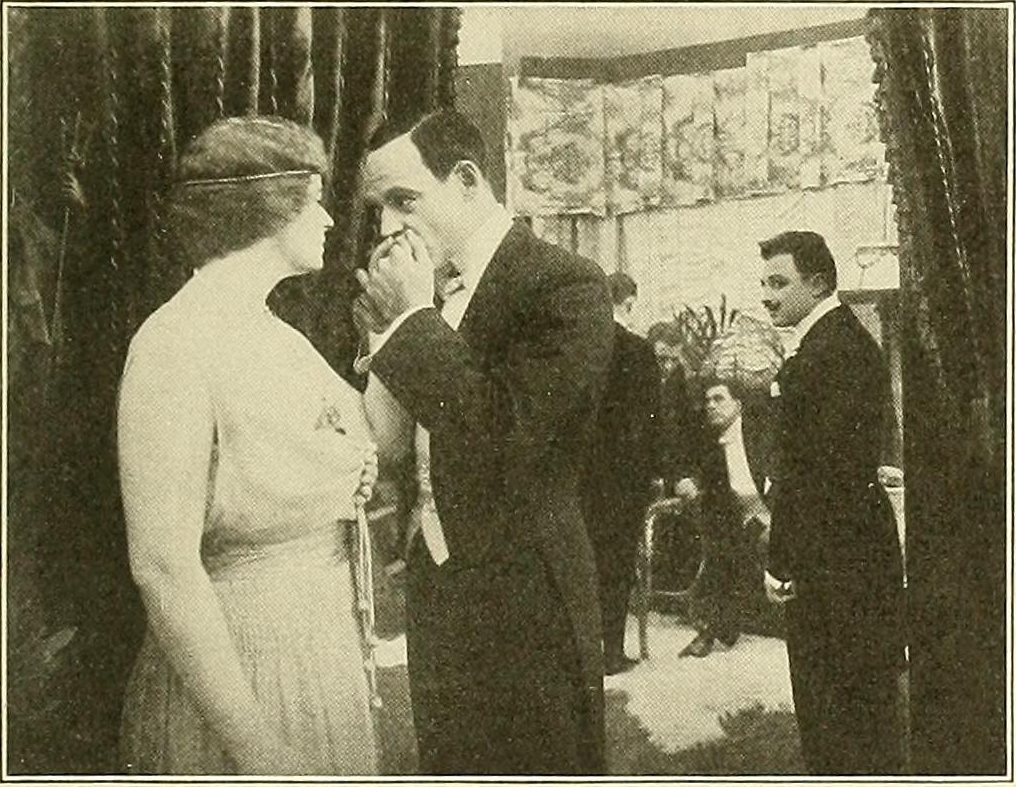
- Directed by: Edward José
- Screenplay by: George B. Seitz
- Based on: The Closing Net by Henry C. Rowland
- Starring: Howard Estabrook; Madlaine Traverse
- Production company: Pathé Exchange
- Distributed by: Pathé Exchange
- Release date: October 9, 1915
- Running time: 5 reels
- Country: USA
- Language: Silent (English intertitles)

The Closing Net is a lost 1915 American silent drama film directed by Edward José, and starring Howard Estabrook and Madlaine Traverse. The film is based on the novel of the same name, by Henry C. Rowland, which was originally serialized in The Saturday Evening Post and then adapted by George B. Seitz into a screenplay. It was produced and distributed by Pathé Exchange.

== Plot ==
Frank Clamart was just a baby when his mother abandoned him to an orphanage, killing herself when she found out that her husband was not the son's father. He grows up in the orphanage, treated terribly by the attendants, and runs away as a young teen. For the next fifteen years, he becomes skilled at cracking safes, falling in with a group of Parisian thieves and roughs. The group consists of Leontine, the "adventuress;" Ivan, the "fence;" Jeff, the "Red;" and Chu Chu, the "shearer." Frank quickly falls for Leontine, which disgusts Chu Chu.

One night, Frank and Leontine are breaking into a house, which he doesn't know belongs to his half-brother. He is caught in the act and is recognized. He repents, but his gang robs the house regardless, and places him under suspicion. Later, he retrieves the stolen goods and returns them to his benefactor. Chu Chu continues to fight with him over Leontine, and shoots Frank in the shoulder while robbing his half-brother a second time. In a taxicab, he runs his enemy off the road and causes him great injury, causing Frank to seek a truce. Chu Chu agrees, but plans to murder him anyways. Just as Chu Chu is about to kill him, the cab driver, Rosalie, who harbors a secret love for Frank, kills Chu Chu in his defense. Frank and Rosalie declare their love for each other, and want to start a new life, far from crime.

== Cast ==
- Howard Estabrook as Frank Clamart
- Madlaine Traverse as Leontine Petrovsky
- Arthur Albro as Chu Chu
- Bliss Milford as Rosalie
- Kathryn Browne-Decker as Edith
- Frederick Macklyn as Jeff
- Eric Wayne as Ivan Leopold

== Production ==
Produced and distributed by Pathé Exchange, the American branch of French production company Pathé Frères, where it was released under the Gold Rooster Play label. Picture rights to The Closing Net novel were acquired in early July, 1915.

== Reception ==
Motography reviewer Thomas C. Kennedy was positive in his review, praising the film for its staging and "adequate" cast. He found the story to be exciting and said "This story is filled with tense situations, and these receive able presentation."

Moving Picture World reviewer Margaret I. MacDonald called the film "one of the most acceptable of motion picture melodramas" and praised the cast as being "excellent."

Motion Picture News reviewer Harvey F. Thew described the film as "batting well above .800 in general excellence" and also called the cast "excellent." He had some criticism for the Parisian sets, saying "there are verandas, streets and houses of the kind which it would be hard to find in France."

== Censorship ==
The Pennsylvania State Board of Censors, one of the six state censorship boards in the United States, initially rejected The Closing Net in its entirety. Though, it appears that the ban was soon lifted, as there is evidence of the film being screened several times within Pennsylvania.

== Preservation ==
With no holdings located in archives, The Closing Net is considered a lost film.
