= Mount Vernon Hospital, New York =

New York (state) hospital and trauma center

Montefiiore Mount Vernon Hospital
- Montefiore Health System

Geography
- Location: Mount Vernon, New York, United States
- Coordinates: 40°54′49″N 73°50′23″W

Services
- Emergency department: Yes
- Beds: 85

History
- Former name: Mount Vernon Hospital
- Opened: 1893

Links
- Lists: Hospitals in New York State

Montefiore Mount Vernon Hospital is an 1890s-founded hospital. It was designated a total-care trauma facility in 1984. In 1986, they expanded and added a 20-bed psychiatric unit and a rehabilitation unit. The hospital also formed an AIDS program.

The Mount Vernon hospital changed its name to Montefiore Mount Vernon Hospital when it was taken over by Montefiore Health Systems.

== History ==
The cornerstone for Mount Vernon Hospital was laid in 1893.

The hospital was located in Mount Vernon's downtown area, which was about a mile square and densely built. It was described in 1986 as "a major institution;" in 1996 it was described as "a financially distressed institution."

They had begun specializing in healing chronic wound cases in 1989. In 1996, they affiliated with another hospital and specialized more, including focused services for mental-health patients. They had experience working with other hospitals, such as offering a program for local diabetics, aided by a larger Bronx-based teaching hospital. In 1999, they closed their maternity unit and redirected expecting mothers to an affiliated hospital that tripled the capacity of its neonatal and maternity wing.

They were a flagship to prevent the spread of infectious diseases within hospitals and the community. Part of this included reaching out to young children with a 'pledge' to wash their hands.
