= Maytime (1937 film) =

1937 film by Robert Zigler Leonard

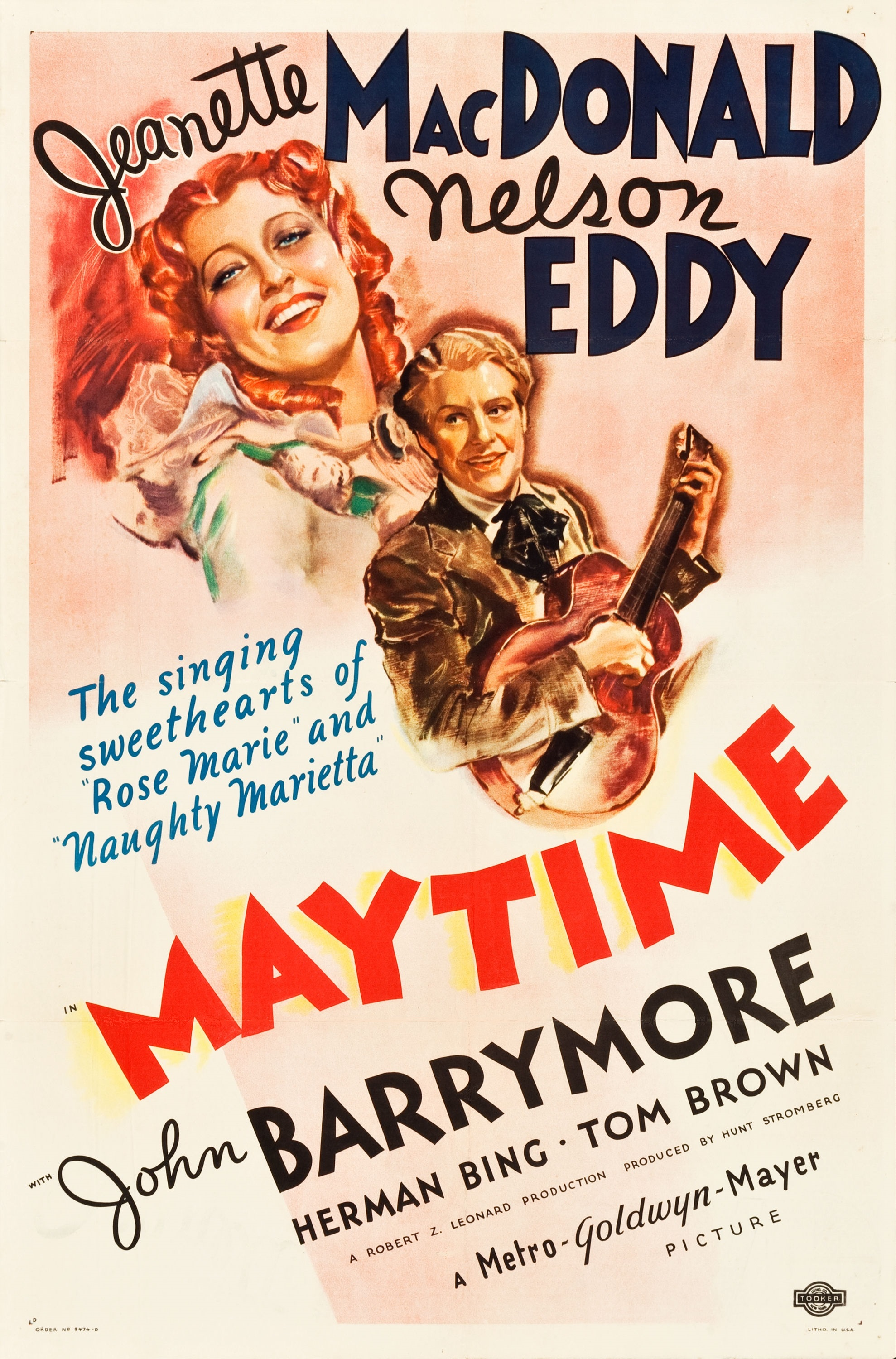
- Original film poster
- Directed by: Robert Z. Leonard
- Written by: Noel Langley; Claudine West (treatment)
- Based on: Maytime; 1917 operetta by Rida Johnson Young
- Produced by: Robert Z. Leonard; Hunt Stromberg; Gregor Rabinovitch (uncredited)
- Starring: Jeanette MacDonald; Nelson Eddy; John Barrymore
- Cinematography: Oliver T. Marsh
- Edited by: Conrad A. Nervig
- Music by: Herbert Stothart; Edward Ward
- Production company: Metro-Goldwyn-Mayer
- Distributed by: Loew's Inc.
- Release date: March 26, 1937
- Running time: 132 minutes
- Country: United States
- Language: English
- Budget: $2,126,000
- Box office: $2,183,000 (earnings in the U.S.) $1,823,000 (earnings in other markets)

Maytime is a 1937 American musical and romantic-drama film produced by MGM. It was directed by Robert Z. Leonard, and stars Jeanette MacDonald and Nelson Eddy. The screenplay was rewritten from the book for Sigmund Romberg's 1917 operetta Maytime by Rida Johnson Young, Romberg's librettist; however, only one musical number by Romberg was retained. Internationally, with its initial release it was the year's highest grossing film.

The film's story greatly resembles that of Noël Coward's operetta Bitter Sweet, including the "frame story" surrounding the main plot. Three years later, MGM filmed Bitter Sweet (1940), a Technicolor version, but altered the plot so that audiences would not notice the similarities.

== Plot ==
At a small town May Day celebration, elderly Miss Morrison tries to console her young friend Kip, whose sweetheart Barbara has been offered a job on the operatic stage. Later, Barbara goes for comfort to Miss Morrison, who reveals that years ago she was the internationally famous opera diva Marcia Mornay. Miss Morrison then relates her story: Marcia, a young American singer in Paris, is guided to success by famed but stern voice teacher Nicolai Nazaroff, who introduces her at the court of Louis Napoleon.

That night, Nicolai proposes to Marcia and she accepts, but they both know that she is not in love with him. Later, feeling restless, Marcia takes a ride, and she is stranded in the Latin Quarter when her driver's horse runs away. In a tavern, she meets American student Paul Allison, who is also a singer, but not as ambitious as Marcia. Although they are attracted to each other, she refuses to see him again out of loyalty to Nicolai, but promises to lunch with him the next day. They enjoy their lunch together, but Marcia again says that they can no longer see each other and leaves. Paul then steals tickets to see her perform in the opera Les Huguenots that evening, and after he is thrown out of his seat by the manager, he goes to her dressing room and only leaves when she promises to join him at St. Cloud for a May Day celebration. During the celebration, Paul tells her he loves her, but she says that she owes Nicolai too much and never could break a promise to him. They part after vowing to remember their day together.

Seven years later, Marcia, who has married Nicolai, has become the toast of the operatic world, but upon her triumphant return to America, she realizes that her life is hollow. Although faithful and devoted to Nicolai, her lack of passion for him has made them both unhappy. In New York, Nicolai arranges for Marcia to sing 'Czaritza' (a fictional opera with music from Tchaikovsky's Symphony Number 5), co-starring Paul, who has become a baritone of some note. Nicolai does not realize that she is still in love with Paul. At rehearsal, they act at first as if they never have met, but Nicolai begins to suspect the truth when Archipenco, Paul's singing teacher, talks about meeting Marcia in Paris many years earlier. Nicolai then recognizes Paul as the young man who left Marcia's dressing room after the performance of Les Huguenots.

On a brilliant opening night, Nicolai becomes jealous over the obvious emotion in Paul and Marcia's onstage love scenes, but doesn't know that they plan to run away together. Later, at their hotel, when Nicolai questions Marcia, she asks for her freedom, which he promises to give. Marcia soon discovers that Nicolai has gone after Paul with a gun. At Paul's apartment, Nicolai shoots him just as Marcia arrives. Paul then dies in her arms, telling her that memories of their May Day together did last him all his life. It is presumed that Nicolai will be arrested for Paul's killing.

At the conclusion of her story, Miss Morrison helps Barbara realize that she and Kip belong together. As she watches the young lovers embrace, Miss Morrison quietly dies. Paul's spirit appears, singing “Will you remember” Marcia's spirit rises and joins him. Arms about each other, they walk out of the garden, pause to smile at the young lovers, and still singing, walk down the avenue of blossoming trees. They cease to be transparent and, united in death, and as they complete the song, she rests her head on his shoulder.

== Cast ==
- Jeanette MacDonald as Marcia Mornay/Miss Morrison
- Nelson Eddy as Paul Allison
- John Barrymore as Nicolai Nazaroff
- Herman Bing as August Archipenco
- Tom Brown as Kip Stuart
- Lynne Carver as Barbara Roberts
- Rafaela Ottiano as Ellen
- Charles Judels as Cabby
- Paul Porcasi as Trentini
- Sig Ruman as Fanchon
- Walter Kingsford as Mr. Rudyard
- Guy Bates Post as Louis Napoleon
- Christian Rub as Sleeper Outside Cafe (uncredited)
- Harry Davenport as Opera Director (uncredited)
- Billy Gilbert as Drunk in Bar

== Production ==
The film was prepared by producer Max Siegel. However before filming he left to go to New York and Irving Thalberg asked David Lewis to take over. The original director was Edmund Goulding who Lewis said was constantly rewriting the script. When Thalberg died the project was assigned to producer Hunt Stomberg and the Hacketts did a rewrite; a new director was assigned.

== Awards and honors ==
The film was nominated for two Academy Awards.

- Academy Award for Best Music, Scoring (nominated)
- Academy Award for Best Sound, Recording (Douglas Shearer) (nominated)

The film is recognized by American Film Institute in these lists:

- 2006: AFI's Greatest Movie Musicals – Nominated

== Soundtrack ==
- "Now It's the Month of Maying"
  - Music by Thomas Morley ("Now Is the Month of Maying"), plus English traditional "Sumer is icumen in", arranged by Sigmund Romberg
  - Sung by chorus
- "Will You Remember (Sweetheart)?"
  - Music by Sigmund Romberg
  - Lyrics by Rida Johnson Young
  - Sung by Nelson Eddy
- "Plantons da Vigne"
  - Sung by Nelson Eddy
- "Vive l'Opera"
  - Music by Herbert Stothart
  - Lyrics by Bob Wright (as Robert Wright) and Chet Forrest (as George Forrest)
  - Sung by Nelson Eddy and chorus
- "Ham and Eggs"
  - Music by Herbert Stothart
  - Lyrics by Bob Wright (as Robert Wright) and Chet Forrest (as George Forrest)
  - Sung by Nelson Eddy and chorus
- "Carry Me Back to Old Virginny"
  - Written by James Allen Bland
  - Sung by Nelson Eddy and Jeanette MacDonald
- "Santa Lucia"
  - Sung by Jeanette MacDonald, Nelson Eddy and an uncredited singer
- "Czaritza"
  - (based on Symphony No. 5)
  - Composed by Pyotr Ilyich Tchaikovsky
  - Sung by Jeanette MacDonald, Nelson Eddy and chorus
- "Les filles de Cadix"
  - Written by Léo Delibes
  - Lyrics by Alfred de Musset
  - Sung by Jeanette MacDonald
- "Le Régiment de Sambre et Meuse"
  - Written by Robert Planquette
  - Sung by Jeanette MacDonald and chorus
- "Nobles seigneur, salut"
  - from the opera Les Huguenots
  - Written by Giacomo Meyerbeer
  - Libretto by Eugène Scribe
  - Sung by Jeanette MacDonald and chorus
- "Cavatine du Page "Une dame, noble et sage"
  - from the opera Les Huguenots Act 1
  - Written by Giacomo Meyerbeer
  - Librette by Eugène Scribe
  - Sung by Jeanette MacDonald and chorus
- Lucia di Lammermoor
  - Written by Gaetano Donizetti
- William Tell
  - Written by Gioachino Rossini
- Tannhäuser
  - Written by Richard Wagner
- Tristan und Isolde
  - Written by Richard Wagner
- Faust
  - Written by Charles Gounod
- Will You Remember (Sweetheart)?"
  - Reprise by Nelson Eddy and Jeannette MacDonald

== Notes ==
- Lewis, David (1993). Curtis, James (ed.). The Creative Producer. Metuchen: Scarecrow Press. ISBN 0-8108-2720-4.
