= Mason Opera House =

Former theater in downtown Los Angeles, California, United States

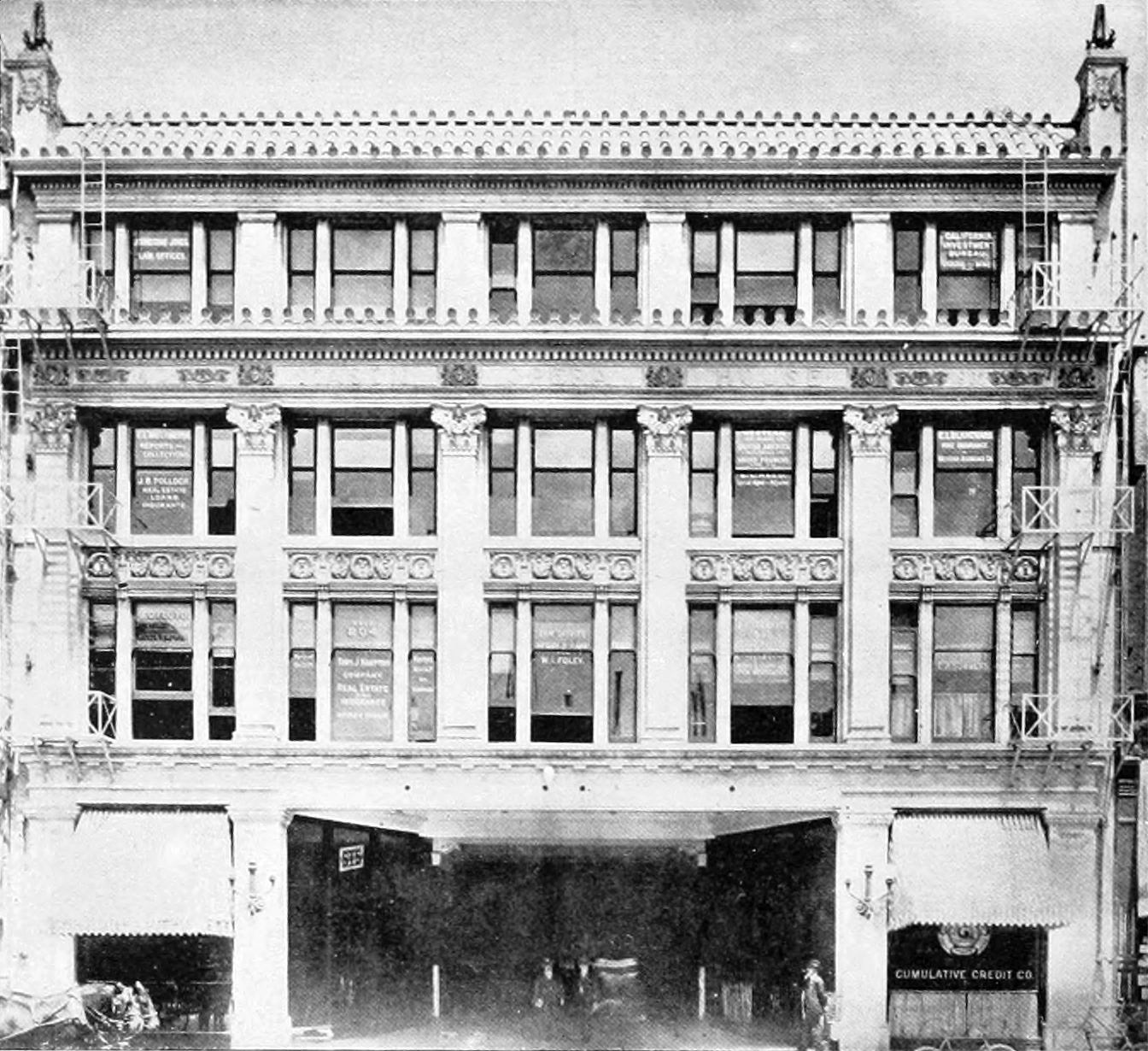
- The building in 1910
- Interactive map of Mason Opera House
- Address: 127 S. Broadway; Los Angeles
- Coordinates: 34.0535°N 118.2464°W
- Capacity: 1650 then 1552 then 1400

Construction
- Opened: June 8, 1903
- Renovated: 1920s
- Closed: 1955
- Demolished: 1956
- Architects: Benjamin Howard Marshall; Meyer and Holler (renovation)

Mason Opera House, also referred to as Mason Theatre, was a theater located in downtown Los Angeles. It was the leading live theater in Los Angeles for decades.

== History ==
Mason Opera house was designed by Benjamin Howard Marshall in association with John B. Parkinson and opened on June 8, 1903. Its capacity was originally reported to be 1650, then 1552, then 1400. The building's original lessee was Harold Wyatt.

Upon opening, the theater became the leading live theater in Los Angeles. Some of the theater's early performances include: the Richard J. Jose Minstrels on August 25, 1903, the comic opera The Free Lance by John Philip Sousa in March 1907, a four-night engagement with Sara Bernhardt in 1911, the Broadway musical The Pink Lady in March 1912, and the De Koven Opera Company production of Robin Hood and seven Stratford-upon-Avon Players productions in March 1914.

In 1920, the theater was owned by A. L. Erlanger, who renamed it Erlanger's Mason Theatre, with Frank Wyatt as manager and Charles Frohman, Klaw and Erlanger, and Oliver Morosco as lessees. The theater was remodeled by Meyer and Holler in the 1920s and leased to RKO in 1930. In the 1930s, the theater was the site of numerous Federal Theatre Project productions.

Frank Fouce assumed control and renamed the theater Fouce's Mason Theatre in 1937. In 1945, the theater started showing Mexican films, and in 1954, the theater was sold to the state, who closed it in 1955 and tore it down in 1956.

== Architecture and design ==
Mason Opera House was four stories tall and contained six buttresses that provided structural support. The roof was made of a fancy tile that formed ridges, similar to but more noticeable than Spanish tile.

Inside, the lobby featured a fountain and the theater featured an orchestra and two balcony levels. The upper balcony could only be accessed from the rear of the building and wasn't used in the theater's final decades.
