= Maytime (musical) =

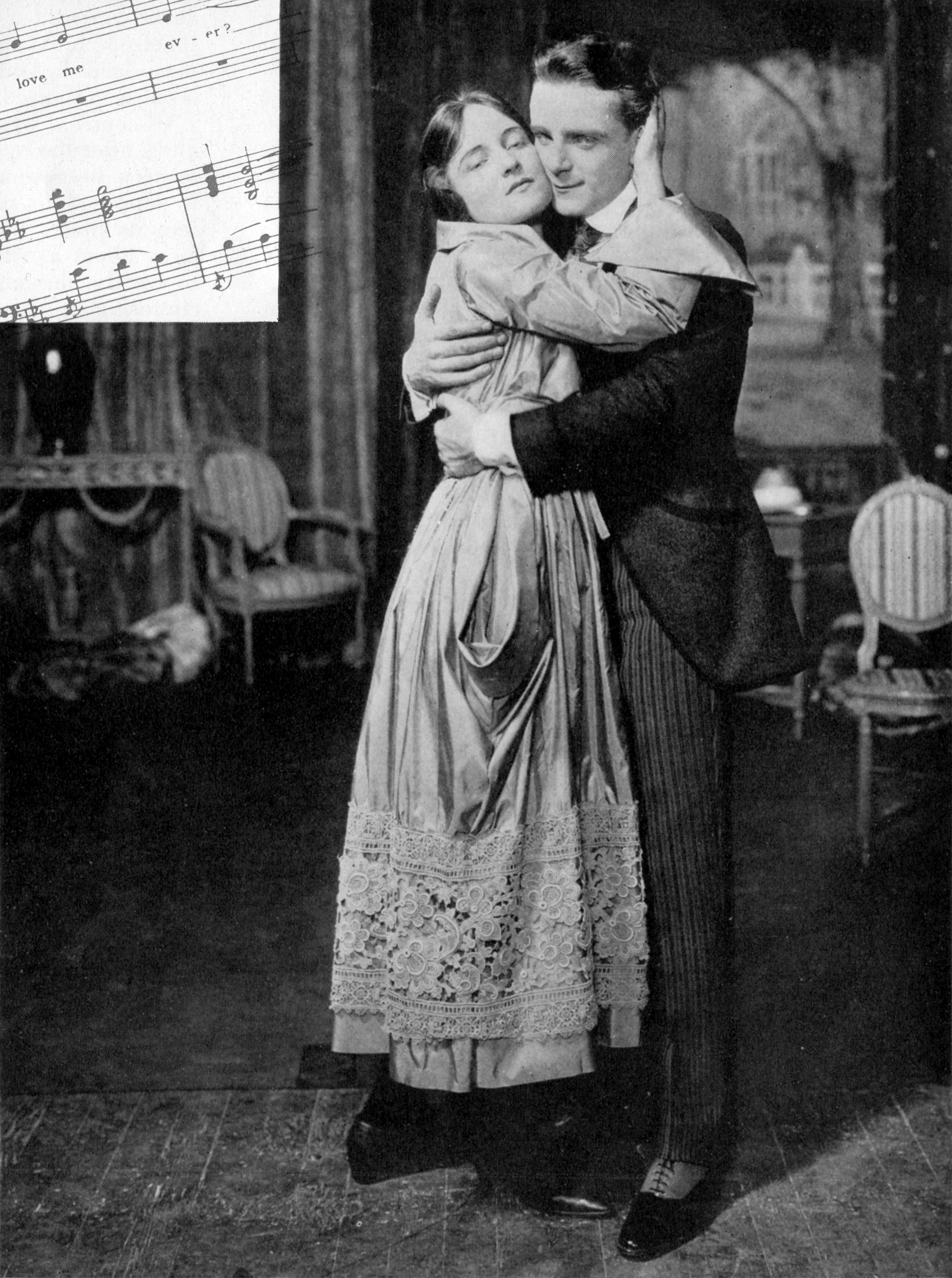
- Peggy Wood and Charles Purcell in the original Broadway production of Maytime
- Music: Sigmund Romberg
- Lyrics: Rida Johnson Young
- Book: Rida Johnson Young
- Basis: Wie einst im Mai (German operetta).
- Productions: 1917 Broadway

Maytime is a musical with music by Sigmund Romberg and lyrics and book by Rida Johnson Young, and with additional lyrics by Cyrus Wood. The story is based on the 1913 German operetta Wie einst im Mai (Like Once in May), composed by Walter Kollo, with words by Rudolf Bernauer and Rudolph Schanzer. The story, set in New York, is told in episodes covering a long period, from 1840 to the early 20th century. Young Ottillie, the daughter of a prominent family is in love with Dick, a poor musician, but they are kept apart by family and circumstance. Years later, their descendants marry. Maytime introduced songs such as "The Road to Paradise", "Will You Remember?" and "Jump Jim Crow".

The musical ran on Broadway from 1917 to 1918. It was the second longest-running book musical in the 1910s, and it established Romberg as one of the leading creators of operettas.

== Synopsis ==
The beautiful Ottilie van Zandt is the daughter of a wealthy colonel who owns a cooperage in New York. She loves Richard "Dick" Wayne, the son of her father's foreman, a poor but gifted musician. The differences in wealth and social status are unacceptable to Ottilie's father, who wishes her to marry her cousin, a drunken libertine.

Dick leaves, travels and becomes very successful, but when he returns, he finds his beloved Ottilie betrothed to another, and so he marries another woman. After many years, both Ottilie and Dick are single again, but her social obligations prevent them from ever consummating their love, though Dick continues to make romantic overtures. He saves Ottilie from bankruptcy by purchasing her home before she is evicted.

Decades later, Ottilie's granddaughter and Dick's protégé meet, fall in love and marry.

== Productions ==
The original Broadway production opened at the Shubert Theatre on August 16, 1917, and later moved to the 44th Street, Broadhurst and Lyric Theatres, running for a total of 492 performances. It starred Peggy Wood and Charles Purcell and featured Ralph Herbert, William Norris, Arthur Albro, and Gertrude Vanderbilt. The New York Times gave the show a rave review, writing that it had "delicate charm" and blended "the tragedy of the individual" with "the eternal comedy of living".

Ohio Light Opera revived the musical in 2005, with a book revised by Julie Wright and Steven Gaigle. It released a recording of the musical the same year.

== Musical numbers ==
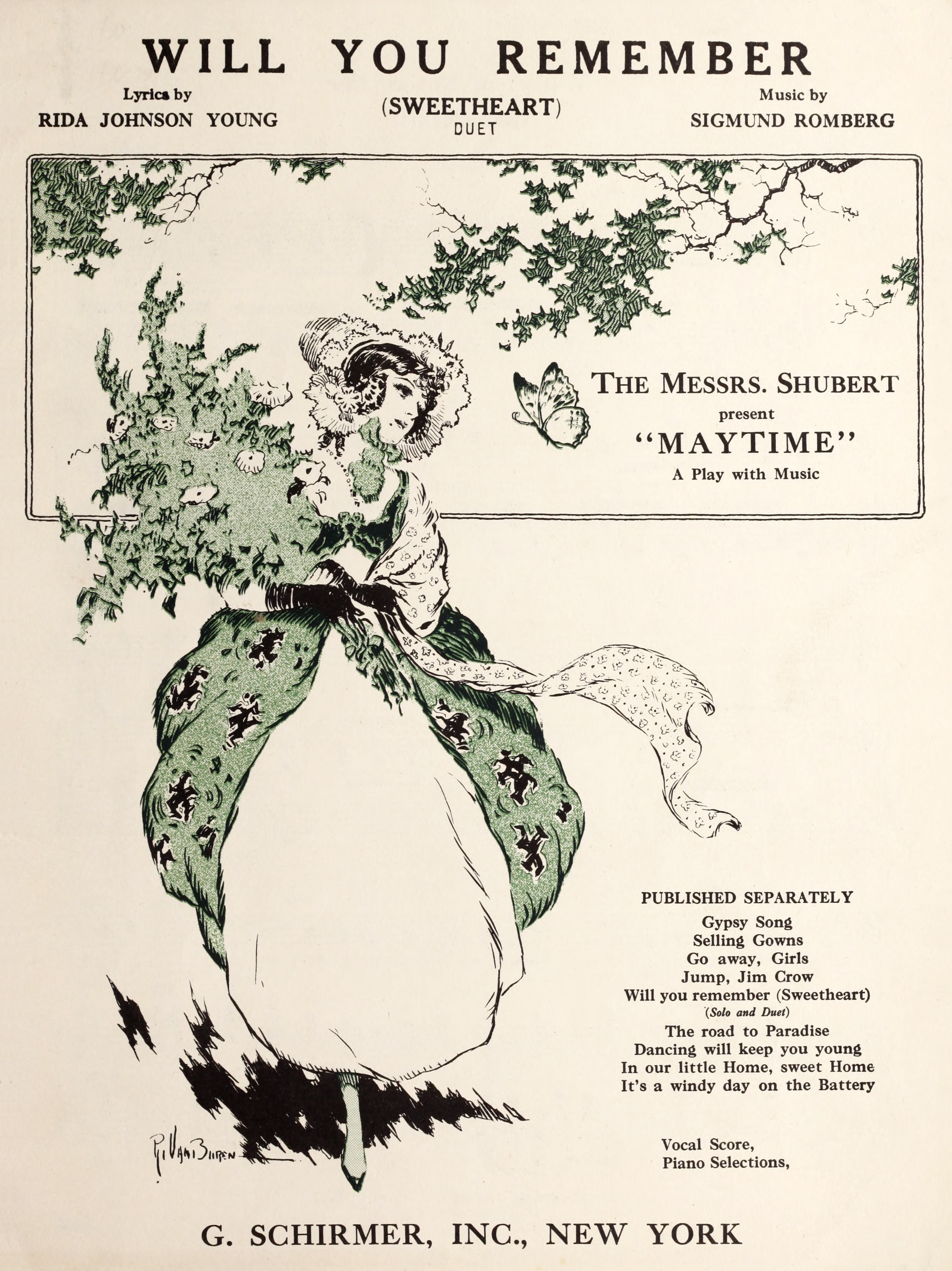
Sheet music for "Will You Remember (Sweetheart)" (1917)

Act 1

- In Our Little Home, Sweet Home – Ottillie and Richard Wayne
- It's a Windy Day at the Battery – Matthew Van Zandt, Alice Tremaine and Girls
- Gypsy Song – Rudolfo
- Will You Remember (Sweetheart)? – Signor Vivalla, Ottillie, Dicky Wayne and Richard

Act 2

- Jump Jim Crow – Matthew and Chorus
- The Road to Paradise – Ottillie and Matthew
- Spanish Dance – Estrella Amorita
- Will You Remember (Sweetheart)? – Signor Vivalla, Ottillie, Dicky and Richard

Act 3

- Odd Lots, Job Lots – Ensemble
- Reminiscence – Little Dick Wayne

Act 4

- Selling Gowns (Lyrics by Cyrus Wood) – Ottillie and Girls
- Dancing Will Keep You Young (Lyrics by Cyrus Wood) – Ermintrude D'Albert and Matthew
- Only One Girl for Me – Dicky and Girls
- Will You Remember (Sweetheart)? – Signor Vivalla, Ottillie, Dicky and Richard

== Settings and characters ==
Act 1 - 1840 - The Van Zandt home in Washington Square, New York City: John Wayne, Colonel van Zandt, Ottillie (his daughter), Richard Wayne (an apprentice), Mathilda van Zandt, Alice Tremaine, Claude van Zandt, Matthew van Zandt, Maria, Rudolfo

Act 2 - 1855 - Mme. Delphine's Night Club: Madame Delphine, Hannaford, Stuyvesant, Doorman, Claude van Zandt, Angelica (Matthew's second wife), Matthew van Zandt, P. T. Barnum, Estrella Amorita, Signor Vivalla, Ottillie van Zandt, Alice Tremaine, Richard Wayne

Act 3 - In the 1880s - The Back Parlor of the Van Zandt house in Washington Square: Madame Delphine, Matthew van Zandt, Lizzie (Matthew's third wife), Little Dick Wayne (Age 5), Richard Wayne, John Rutherford, Mr. Hicks (auctioneer), Algernon, Ottillie

Act 4 - Twentieth Century - Mlle. Brown's Dressmaking Establishment: Ottillie (known as Mlle. Brown), Hortense (a model), Letty, Estelle (forewoman), Ermintrude d'Albert, Winifred St. Albans, Matthew van Zandt, Dicky Wayne

== Adaptations ==
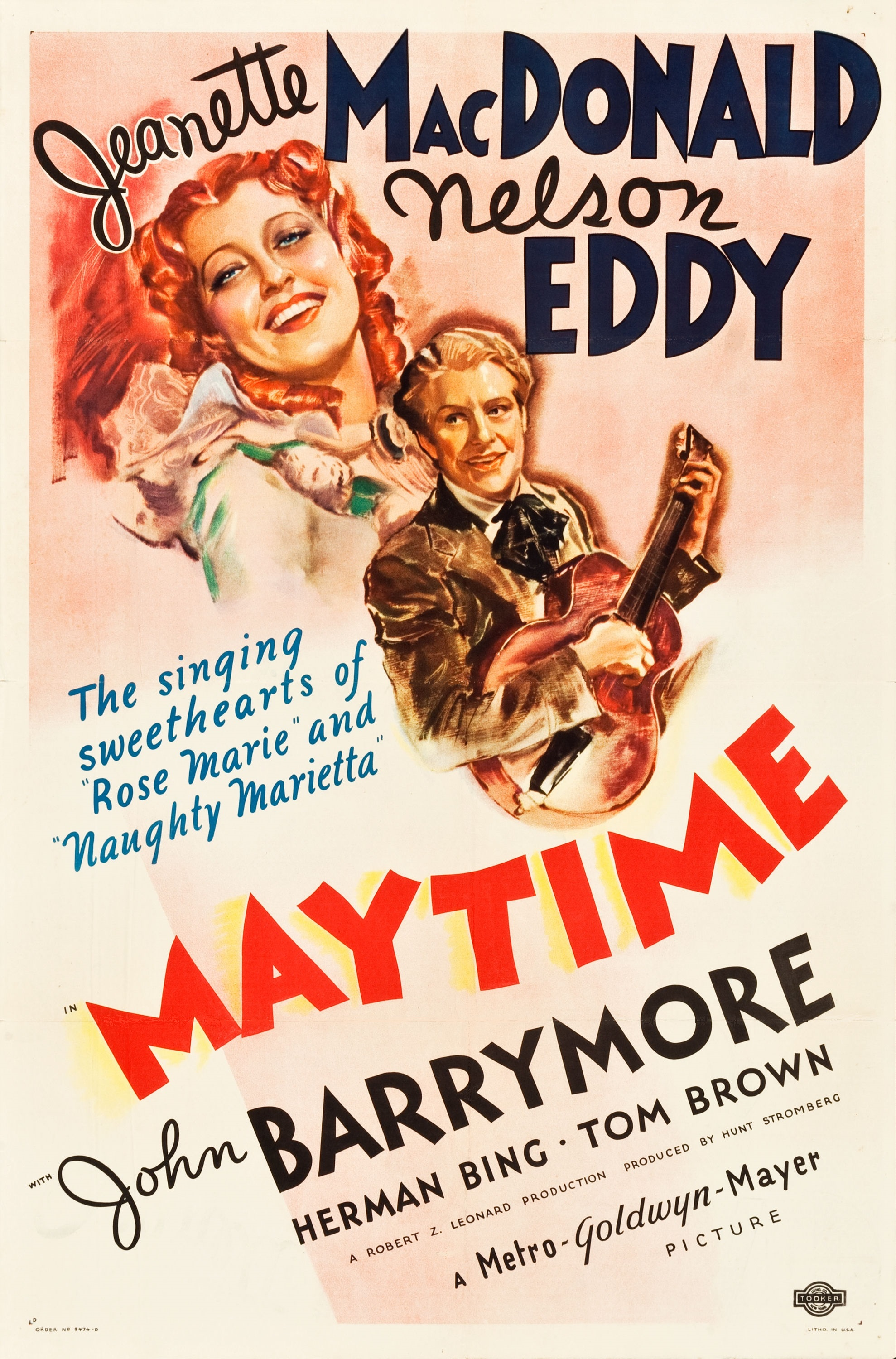
Poster for the 1937 film adaptation

Maytime was adapted to film twice, in 1923 and again in 1937. The earlier version was thought to have been lost, but a copy was found in 2009 in the New Zealand Film Archive. Four of the seven reels have been restored. The 1937 version, starring Jeanette MacDonald and Nelson Eddy, has a different plot from the musical's book and a different score except for one song.

== Gallery ==
Images from the original production:

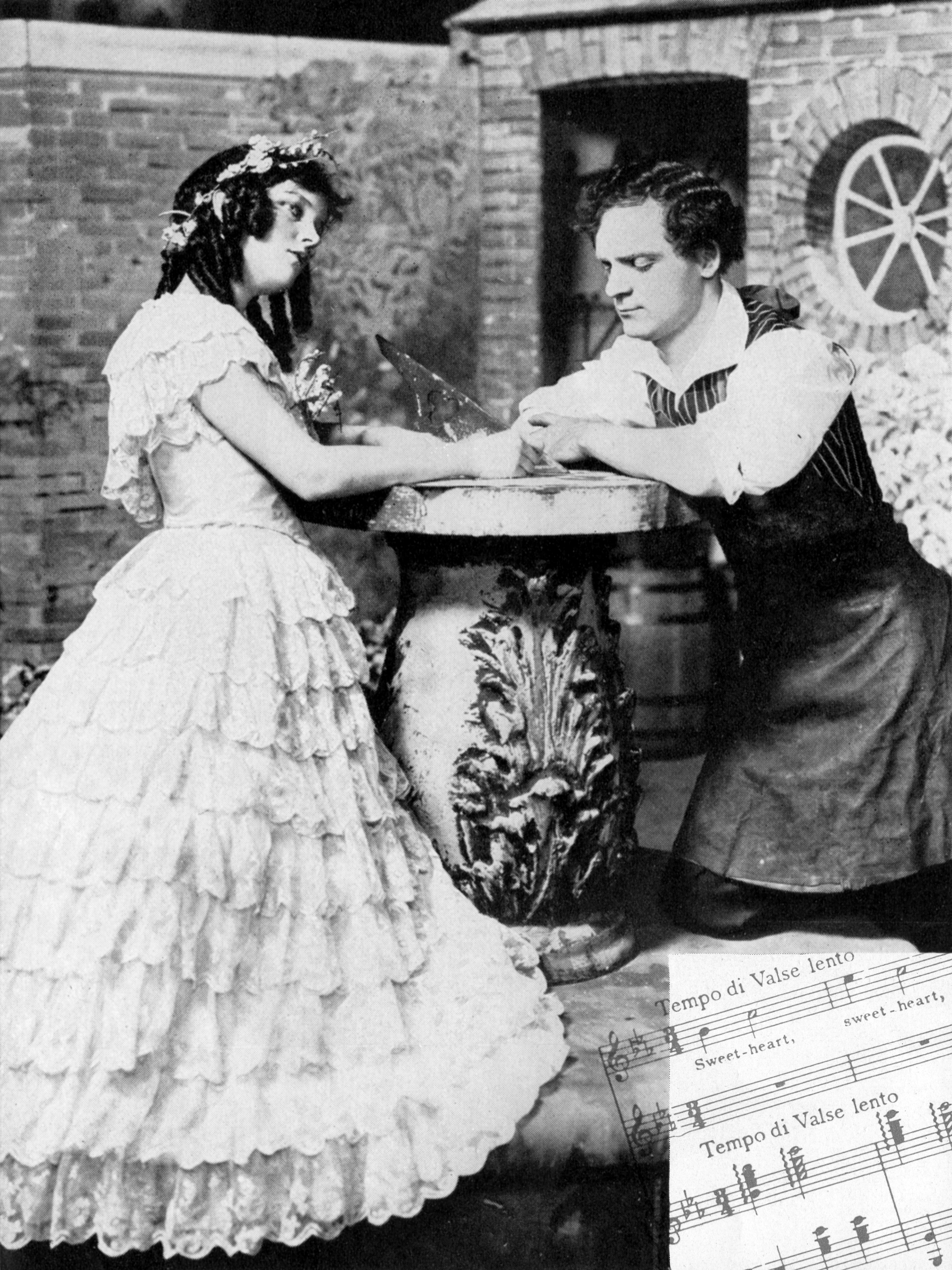
Young Ottillie and Richard in love

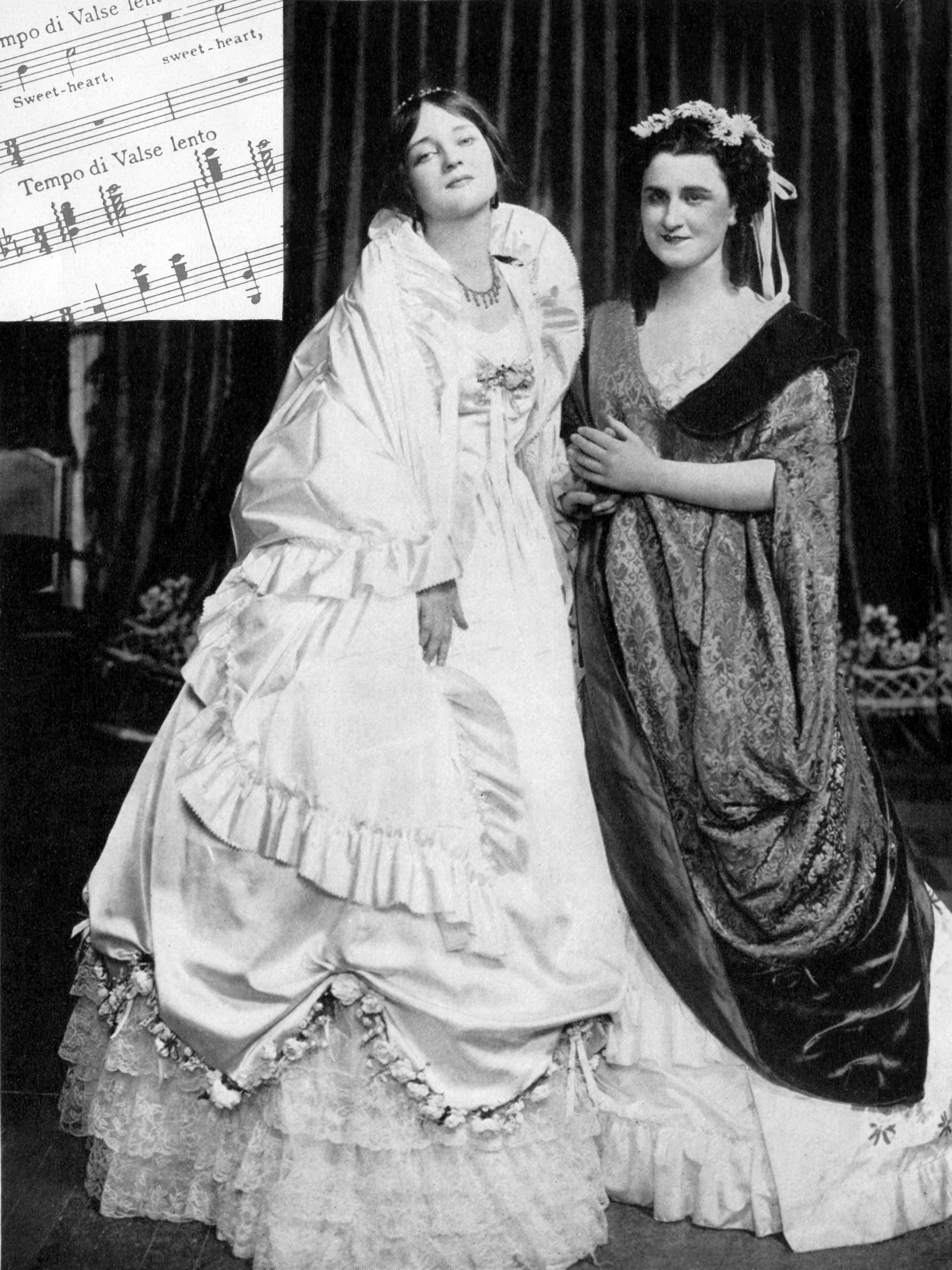
Ottillie (left) grows into young girlhood

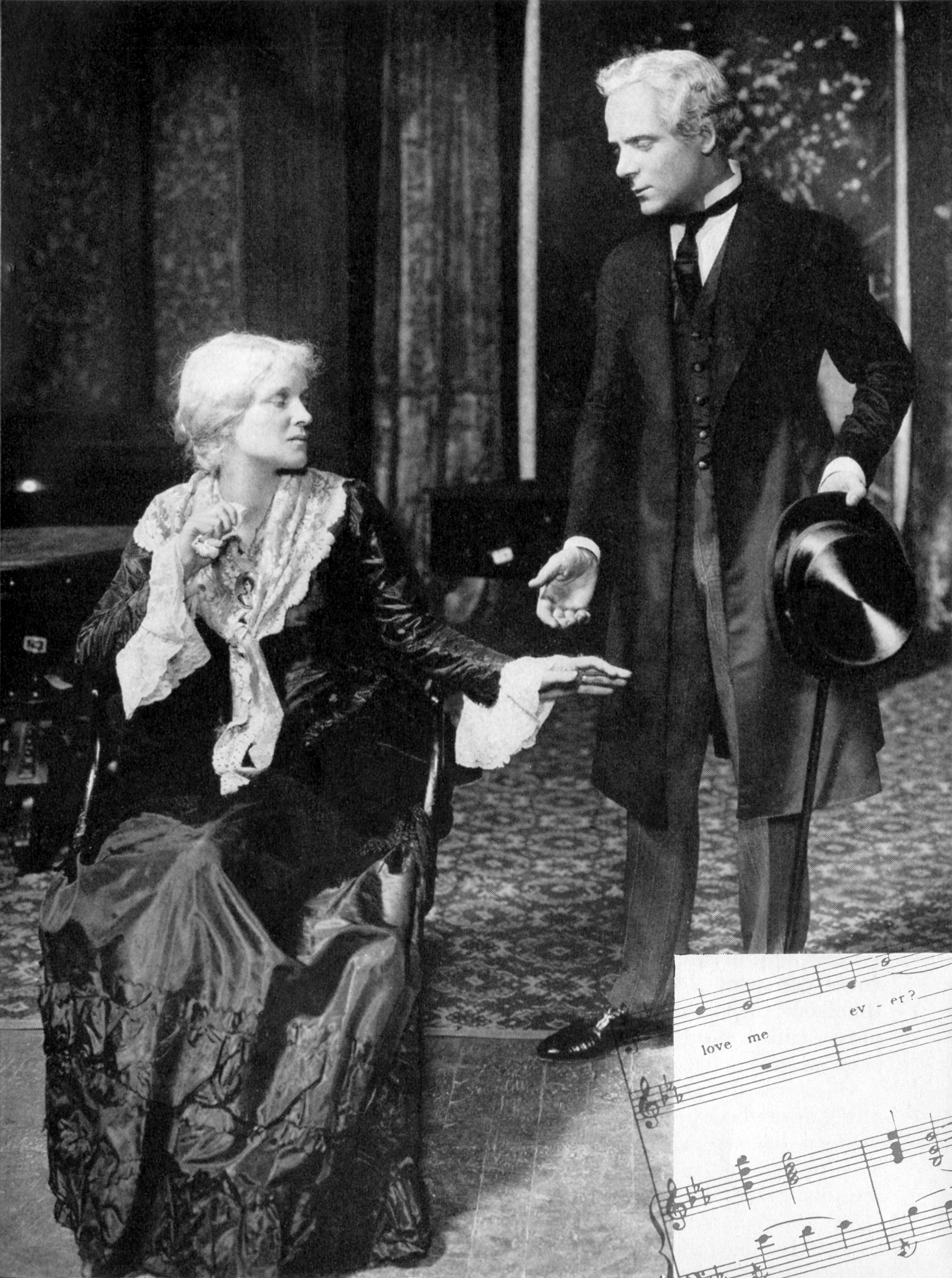
The elderly Ottillie and Richard still in love
