= Sigmund Romberg =

Hungarian-American composer (1887–1951)

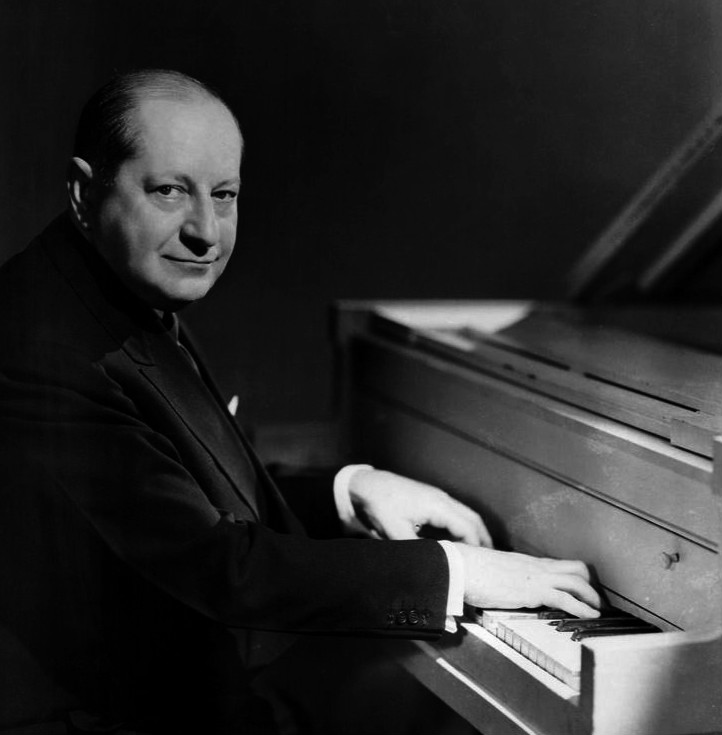
Romberg in 1949

Sigmund Romberg (July 29, 1887 – November 9, 1951) was a Hungarian-born American composer. He is best known for his musicals and operettas, particularly The Student Prince (1924), The Desert Song (1926) and The New Moon (1928).

Early in his career, Romberg was employed by the Shubert brothers to write music for their musicals and revues, including several vehicles for Al Jolson. For the Shuberts, he also adapted several European operettas for American audiences, including the successful Maytime (1917) and Blossom Time (1921). His three hit operettas of the mid-1920s, named above, are in the style of Viennese operetta, but his other works from that time mostly employ the style of American musicals of their eras. He also composed film scores.

== Biography ==
=== Early life ===
Romberg was born in Hungary as Siegmund Rosenberg to a Jewish family, Adam and Clara Rosenberg, in Gross-Kanizsa (Hungarian: Nagykanizsa), Austria-Hungary (today located in Hungary). In 1889 Romberg and his family moved to Belišće, which was then in Hungary, where he attended a primary school. Influenced by his father, Romberg learned to play the violin at six, and piano at eight years of age. He enrolled at Osijek gymnasium in 1897, where he was a member of the high school orchestra. He went to Vienna to study engineering, but he also took composition lessons while living there. In June 1909, he boarded the SS Oceanic as a second-class cabin passenger, sailing from the Port of Southampton, England, to the Port of New York. After a brief stint working in a pencil factory in New York, he was employed as a pianist in cafés and restaurants.

=== Musical career ===
He eventually founded his own orchestra and published a few songs, which, despite their limited success, brought him to the attention of the Shubert brothers, who in 1914 hired him to write music for their Broadway theatre shows. That year he wrote his first successful Broadway revue, The Whirl of the World. He then contributed songs to several American musical adaptations of Viennese operettas, including the successful The Blue Paradise (1915). Even more successful was the musical Maytime, in 1917. Both involved love across generations and included nostalgic waltzes, along with more modern American dance music. At the same time, Romberg contributed songs to the Shuberts' popular revues The Passing Show of 1916 and The Passing Show of 1918 and to two vehicles for Al Jolson: Robinson Crusoe, Jr. (1916), an extravaganza burlesque on the familiar story, and Sinbad (1918), an Arabian Nights-themed musical. Romberg wrote another Jolson vehicle in 1921, Bombo. He wrote the music for the musical comedy Poor Little Ritz Girl, which also had songs by Richard Rodgers. He also wrote the music for Love Birds (1921).

Romberg's adaptation of melodies by Franz Schubert for Blossom Time (1921, produced in the UK as Lilac Time) was a great success. He subsequently wrote his best-known operettas, The Student Prince (1924), The Desert Song (1926) and The New Moon (1928), which are in a style similar to the Viennese operettas of Franz Lehár. He also wrote Princess Flavia (1925), an operetta based on The Prisoner of Zenda. His other works, My Maryland (1927), a successful romance; Rosalie (1928), together with George Gershwin; and May Wine (1935), with lyrics by Oscar Hammerstein II, about a blackmail plot; and Up in Central Park (1945), are closer to the American musical in style. In 1948, he wrote a new score for "My Romance" after the show had folded in try-outs. Romberg also wrote a number of film scores and adapted his own work for film.

Columbia Records asked Romberg to conduct orchestral arrangements of his music (which he had played in concerts) for a series of recordings from 1945 to 1950 that were issued both on 78-rpm and 33-1/3 rpm discs. These performances are now prized by record collectors. Naxos Records digitally remastered the recordings and issued them in the U.K. (They cannot be released in the U.S. because Sony Music Entertainment, which is a parent company of Columbia Records, holds the copyright for their American release.) Much of Romberg's music, including extensive excerpts from his operettas, was released on LP during the 1950s and 1960s, especially by Columbia, Capitol, and RCA Victor. Nelson Eddy and Jeanette MacDonald, who appeared in an MGM adaptation of The New Moon in 1940, regularly recorded and performed his music. There have also been periodic revivals of the operettas.

=== Personal life ===
Romberg married twice. Little is known about his first wife, Eugenia, who appears on a 1920 federal census form as being Austrian. His second wife was Lillian Harris, whom he married on March 28, 1925, in Paterson, New Jersey. They had no children. Harris was born March 8, 1898, and died April 15, 1967, in New York City.

Romberg died in 1951, aged 64, of a stroke at his Ritz Towers Hotel suite in New York City and was interred in the Ferncliff Cemetery in Hartsdale, New York.

== Selected songs ==
- Her Soldier Boy – 1917
- Home Again – 1916, lyrics: Augustus Barratt
- Kiss Waltz – 1916, lyrics: Rida Johnson Young
- Mother – 1916, lyrics: Rida Johnson Young
- Sister Susie's Started Syncopation – 1915, lyrics: Harold Atteridge
- Won't You Send a Letter to Me? – 1917, lyrics: Harold Atteridge
- Lover, Come Back to Me – 1928, lyrics: Oscar Hammerstein II
- One Kiss – 1928, lyrics: Hammerstein
- Softly, as in a Morning Sunrise – 1928, lyrics: Hammerstein
- Stout Hearted Men – 1928, lyrics: Hammerstein

== Media ==
Romberg was the subject of the 1954 Stanley Donen-directed film Deep in My Heart, in which he was portrayed by José Ferrer. The film was an adaptation of Elliott Arnold 's 1949 biography of Romberg.

His operetta The New Moon was the basis for two film adaptations, both titled New Moon; the 1930 version starred Lawrence Tibbett and Grace Moore in the main roles, and the 1940 version starred Jeanette MacDonald and Nelson Eddy.

"Softly, as in a Morning Sunrise" and "Lover, Come Back to Me" from The New Moon are jazz standards and have been performed by many jazz performers.

== Radio ==
Romberg starred in An Evening with Romberg on NBC June 12, 1945 – August 31, 1948, mostly Tuesdays at 10:30 pm as a summer replacement series for Hildegarde's Raleigh Room (1945) and for The Red Skelton Show (1947–1948). The program featured three vocalists (Anne Jamison, Reinhold Schmidt, Robert Merrill), a 58-piece orchestra, and Frank Gallop as host/announcer. Music genres included "operatic arias, short symphonic works and overtures to popular songs, light classics, dance music and even a bit of outright jazz."

== Honors ==
Since 1970, Belišće organizes musical evenings in Romberg's honor; similar events are held in Osijek since 1995. He was named as one of the meritorious and notable citizens of Osijek. Romberg was inducted into the Songwriters Hall of Fame in 1970.
