= Rida Johnson Young =

American dramatist (1869–1926)

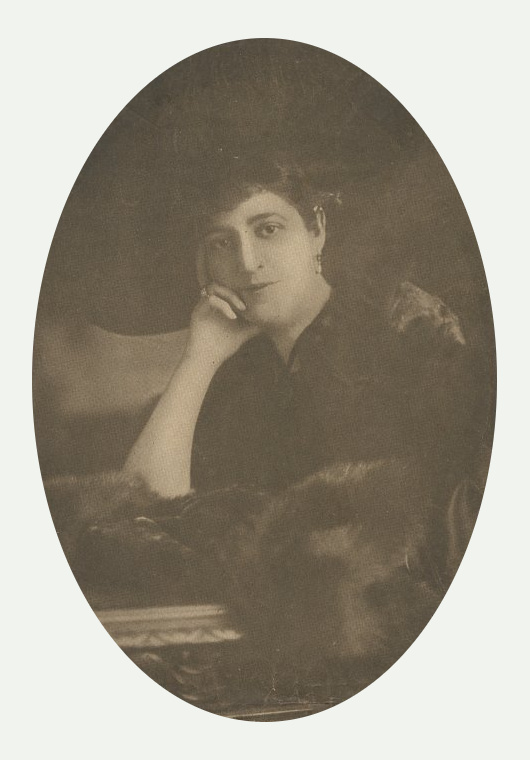
Rida Johnson Young (1910)

Rida Johnson Young (born Rida Louise Johnson; February 28, 1869 – May 8, 1926) was an American playwright, songwriter and librettist. Young wrote over 30 plays and musicals and approximately 500 songs. She was inducted into the Songwriters Hall of Fame in 1970. Some of her better-known lyrics include "Mother Machree" from the 1910 show Barry of Ballymore, "Italian Street Song", "I'm Falling in Love with Someone" and "Ah! Sweet Mystery of Life" from Naughty Marietta, and "Will You Remember?" from Maytime.

== Early life and career ==
Young was born in Baltimore, Maryland. She was an actress early in her career with both the Viola Allen and E. H. Sothern Broadway (New York) companies before working for the music publisher Isidore Witmark. As a playwright, her first work, Lord Byron, was produced in 1900 by actor-producer James Young, to whom she was married from 1904 to 1910. He was later married to actress Clara Kimball.

Young's Brown of Harvard opened in 1906 at Princess Theatre in New York City. It was the first Broadway play written by Young and contains her song "When Love Is Young"; it was adapted as a silent movie in 1911. This play was followed by the 1907 comic play The Boys of Company "B" which premiered at the Lyceum Theatre and featured Florence Nash in her Broadway debut. The Lancers was a 1907 musical with music and lyrics by Cecilia Loftus and George Spink. Glorious Betsy, a 1908 play that was remade as a silent film of the same name in 1928 directed by Alan Crosland, was nominated for an Academy Award for Writing Adapted Screenplay. The play The Lottery Man opened at Bijou Theatre in 1909 and ran for 200 performances. The film version from 1916 featured Oliver Hardy. Ragged Robin, a musical set in Ireland in 1830, is based on a book by Young. It opened at Academy of Music in 1910 and ran for only 16 performances.

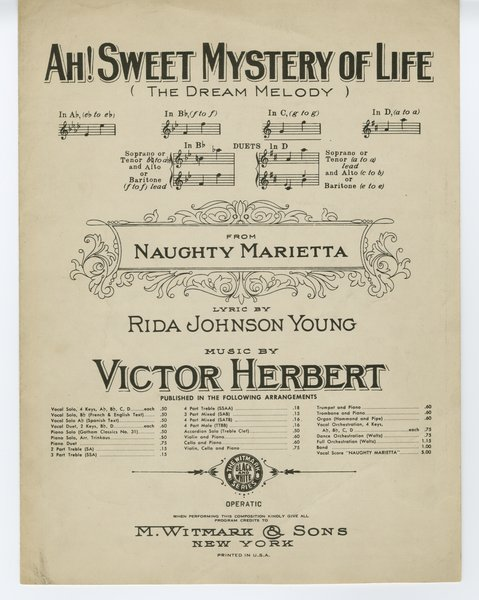
Sheet music for "Ah! Sweet Mystery of life" from Naughty Marietta (1910)

== Naughty Marietta and later years ==
Young wrote book and lyrics to the operetta Naughty Marietta, composer Victor Herbert's greatest success. Produced by Oscar Hammerstein, it opened at New York Theatre in 1910, ran for 136 performances and was frequently revived. A film version from 1935 was nominated for the Academy Award for Best Picture. Her play The Marriage Bond was adapted into a 1916 film of the same name. Young wrote the lyrics of "Kiss Waltz" and "Mother" in 1916, both of which were set to music by Sigmund Romberg.

Additional Broadway productions with contributions from Young include Barry of Ballymore (1911), Next (1911, a play), Macushla (1912, with music by Ernest R. Ball), The Red Petticoat (1912, with music by Jerome Kern), The Isle o' Dreams (1913, with music by Ernest R. Ball), The Girl and the Pennant (1913, a play, co-written with Christy Mathewson), Shameen Dhu (1914, a play), Lady Luxury (1914, with music by William Schroeder), Captain Kidd, Jr. (1916, 128 performances), Her Soldier Boy (Astor Theatre 1916, with music by Emmerich Kalman, 198 performances), His Little Widows (1917, with music by William Schroeder), Maytime (Shubert Theatre 1917, 492 performances), Sometime (Shubert Theatre 1918, 283 performances), Little Simplicity (Astor Theatre, 1918, with music by Augustus Barratt), Little Old New York (Plymouth Theatre 1920, a play, 308 performances), The Dream Girl (Ambassador Theatre 1924, with music by Victor Herbert, 117 performances) and Cock O' the Roost (1924, a play). She also wrote the screenplay for the 1919 Bessie Love film The Little Boss.

In 1926, at the age of 51, Young died in Stamford, Connecticut, of breast cancer.
