= Zeisler =

Zeisler is a surname. Notable people with the surname include:

- Alfred Zeisler (1892–1985), American film producer, director, actor and screenwriter
- Andi Zeisler, American journalist and writer
- Bat-Sheva Zeisler, Israeli vocalist, actress, and voice teacher
- Claire Zeisler (1903–1991), American fiber artist who expanded the expressive qualities of knotted and braided threads
- Fannie Bloomfield Zeisler (1863–1927), Austrian-born U.S. pianist
- Klaus Zeisler, East German sprint canoeist who competed in the mid-1970s
- Sigmund Zeisler (1860–1931), Austrian-born U.S. attorney, known for his defense of radicals in Chicago in the 1880s
