= Florsheim (surname) =

Florsheim is an Ashkenazi Jewish surname. People with the surname include:

- Bobby Florsheim (born 1969), American screenwriter
- Harold M. Florsheim (fl. 1920s), businessman and builder of the Harold Florsheim House
- Lillian Florsheim (1896–1988), American sculptor
- Milton S. Florsheim (1868–1936), Canadian-American businessman, chairman and founder of Florsheim Shoes
- Richard A. Florsheim (1916–1979), American painter, lithographer, and sculptor
