= Leroy Binkley =

American architect (1920/1921–1994)

- Born: 1920/1921; Chicago, Illinois
- Died: March 3, 1994 (age 73); Lake Forest, Illinois
- Occupation: architect
- Spouse: Joan Florsheim
- Children: Lisa Binkley Brunke; Peter Binkley
- Family: Paul Rand (brother-in-law); Claire Block Florsheim Zeisler (mother-in-law)

Leroy "Roy" Binkley (1920/1921 – March 3, 1994) was an American architect. He created modern homes in the Chicago area and some in Connecticut, including The Allen House (Westport, Connecticut) which is listed on the National Register of Historic Places.

== Biography ==
Binkley was born in Chicago, Illinois. He studied under Mies van der Rohe. He later worked with John Black Lee at the office of Paul Schweikher in Chicago.

== Personal life ==
He was married to Joan Florsheim, daughter of Claire (née Block) Florsheim Zeisler (1903–1991) and Harold Florsheim (son of Milton S. Florsheim, the founder of Florsheim Shoes); he had two children Lisa Binkley Brunke and Peter Binkley. His sister was married to art director and graphic designer Paul Rand for whom he designed a house. He died on March 3, 1994, at the age of 73 in Lake Forest, Illinois.
