= Florsheim =

Flörsheim (or Flörsheim am Main) is a town in Hesse, Germany.

Florsheim can also mean:

- Florsheim (surname)
- Flörsheim-Dalsheim, including Nieder-Flörsheim, commune in Rheinland-Pfalz, Germany
- Ober-Flörsheim, commune in Rheinland-Pfalz, Germany
- Florsheim Shoes, American shoe company
