= Weyenberg Shoe Factory =

- U.S. National Register of Historic Places
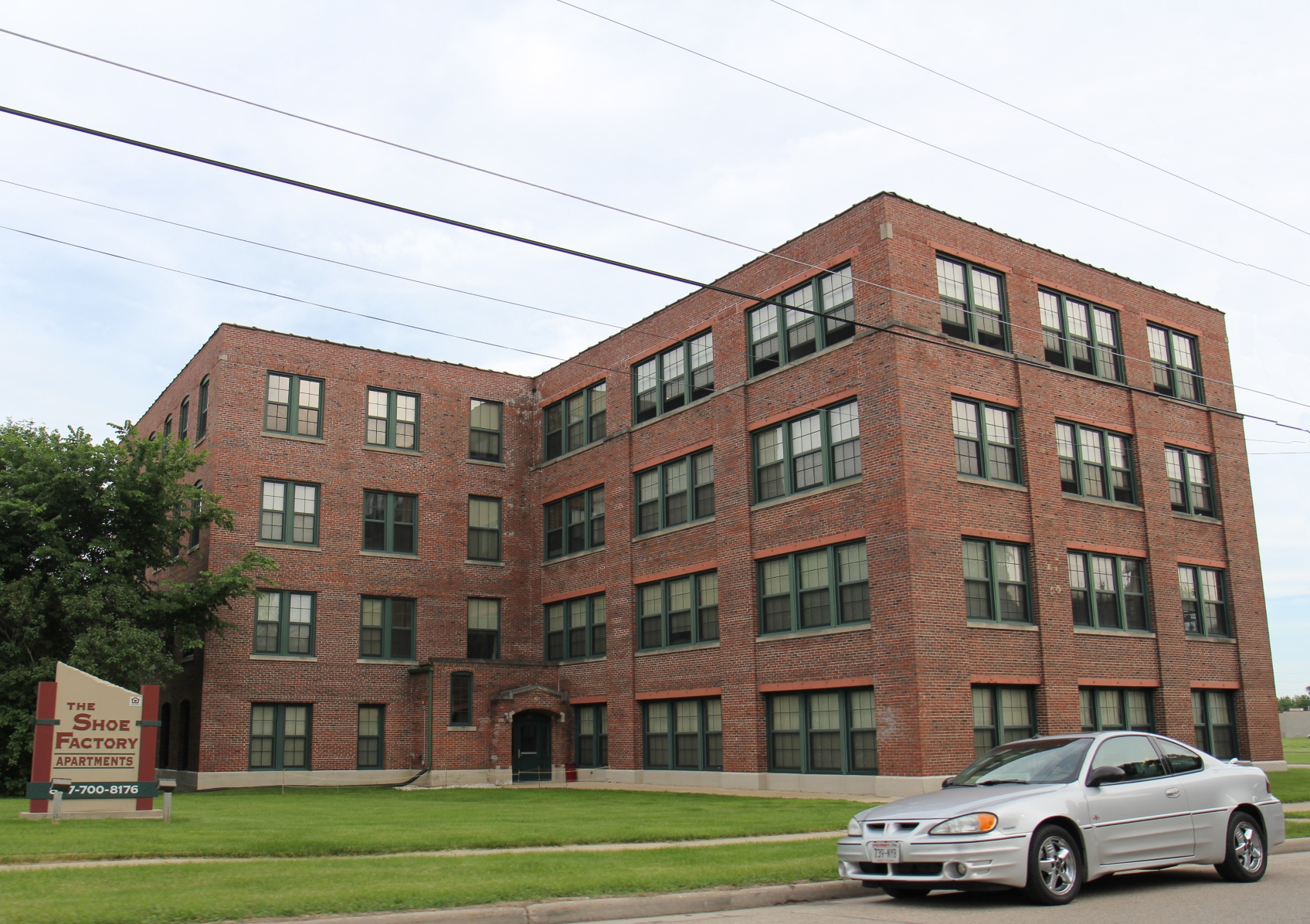
- Weyenberg Shoe Factory
- Location: 913 N. Spring St., Beaver Dam, Wisconsin
- Coordinates: 43°27′53″N 88°49′55″W
- Area: 2.1 acres (0.85 ha)
- Built: 1919
- Architectural style: Late 19th and Early 20th Century American Movements
- NRHP reference No.: 00001452
- Added to NRHP: November 22, 2000

The Weyenberg Shoe Factory is located in Beaver Dam, Wisconsin.

== History ==
The building originally served as a factory and a warehouse for the Weyenberg Shoe Company. Eventually, the company became the Weyco Group, and has gone on to produce brands including Florsheim Shoes. The building was used for its original purpose until 1994. Since then, it has been converted into an apartment building.

It was added to the State and the National Register of Historic Places in 2000.
