= The One I Love =

The One I Love may refer to:

- The One I Love (Belongs to Somebody Else), a 1920s song
- "The One I Love" (Allan Jones song), a song from the 1938 movie Everybody Sing
- "Dedicated to the One I Love", a 1957 song by The Shirelles
- "The One I Love" (R.E.M. song), a 1987 song and a top ten hit in the US.
- "The One I Love" (David Gray song), a 2005 song and a top ten hit in the UK.
- The One I Love (manga), a manga series by Clamp
- The One I Love (film), a 2014 American film
- "The One I Love", a 2014 song by Blonde Redhead from Barragán
- "One I Love", a 2002 song by Coldplay and the B-side of the single "In My Place"
