= Mary Jones Bradley =

American racehorse owner (1920–2010)

- Racing colors of Mary Jones Bradley
- Born: Mary Elizabeth Florsheim; January 17, 1920; Chicago, Illinois
- Died: February 5, 2010 (aged 90)
- Resting place: Pierce Brothers Westwood Village Memorial Park and Mortuary
- Spouse(s): Robert K. Schwab; Robert Boyd Picking (1948–1951); Allan Jones (1957–1964); Robert Earl Bradley (1971)
- Children: 1
- Parents: Irving Florsheim (father); Lillian Florsheim (mother)
- Relatives: Milton S. Florsheim (grandfather); Bertrand Goldberg (brother-in-law)

Mary Elizabeth Florsheim Schwab Picking Jones Bradley was an American heiress, racehorse owner and breeder. She was known for owning Cougar II, who would go on to be named to the National Museum of Racing and Hall of Fame.

== Biography ==
Bradley was born Mary Elizabeth Florsheim in Chicago in 1920. She was the daughter of Irving Florsheim, the chairman of the Florsheim Shoe Company. Her grandfather, Milton S. Florsheim founded the company. Her mother, Lillian Florsheim was a sculptor.

She grew up riding horses at her father's Red Top farm in Libertyville, Illinois. She married her first husband Robert K. Schwab and had a daughter. In 1948 she married her second husband, Robert Boyd Picking, an architect.

=== Move to Los Angeles ===
In 1951, Florsheim moved to Los Angeles with her daughter Ellen. There, the heiress would frequently appear in the society pages. By 1954, she reportedly began a romance with actor John Carroll. In November 1957, actor and singer Allan Jones announced that he and Mary were planning to marry, despite being married to other people at the time. Jones told reporters, "We are in love and want to get married if I can get a divorce". The couple were to marry in Las Vegas in late December 1957, reportedly five hours after his divorce was finalized from his wife of 21 years, Irene Hervey. In 1958, Mary Jones was hospitalized after a suicide attempt when the couple got into an argument. Mary Jones recovered after three days in a coma. The couple would divorce in 1964.

By 1968 Mary Jones had moved on to dating Texas oil man and ex husband of Zsa Zsa Gabor, Joshua Cosden. Three years later in 1971, Mary Picking Jones married Robert Earl Bradley.

=== Thoroughbred racing ===
In California, Mary got involved in Thoroughbred racing. With her trainer, Charles E. Whittingham, Mary would have considerable success on the racetrack, throughout the 1970s and 1980s. On the advice of her trainer, Mary purchased Cougar II, a racehorse recently imported from Chile. He would win $1,162,275 over the course of his racing career. After Cougar II finished racing, Bradley stood him to stud. Cougar II would earn more than $11 million as a stallion. His progeny included Gato Del Sol, the winner of the 1982 Kentucky Derby, and Exploded, whom Bradley bred and raced. In 2006, Cougar II was named to the National Museum of Racing and Hall of Fame.

Bradley died on February 5, 2010 at the age of 90.
