= Flürscheim =

Flurscheim (or Flürscheim) is a surname. Notable people with the surname include:

- Herman A. Flurscheim (1851–1914), New York retailer and art collector
- Michael Flürscheim (1844–1912), German economist

== See also ==
- Florsheim (disambiguation)
