= Sigmund Zeisler =

American lawyer (1860–1931)

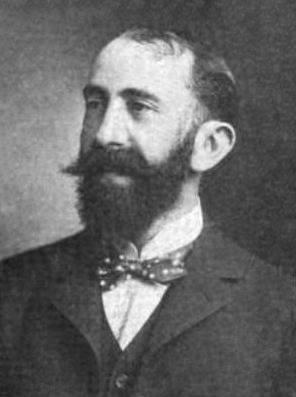
- Born: April 11, 1860; Bielitz, Austrian Silesia, Austrian Empire
- Died: June 4, 1931 (aged 71); Chicago, Illinois, United States
- Education: J.D. Northwestern University School of Law
- Alma mater: University of Vienna
- Occupation: Lawyer
- Spouses: Fannie Bloomfield (m. 1885; died 1927) Amelia Spellman (m. 1930)
- Children: Leonard Bloomfield Zeisler; Paul Bloomfield Zeisler; Ernest Bloomfield Zeisler
- Family: Claire Zeisler (daughter-in-law); Maurice Bloomfield (brother-in-law); Leonard Bloomfield (nephew-in-law)

Sigmund Zeisler (1860–1931) was a German-Jewish U.S. attorney born in Austria and known for his defense of radicals in Chicago in the 1880s. His wife was the famed concert pianist Fannie Bloomfield Zeisler.

== Childhood, marriage and legal education ==
Sigmund Zeisler was born in Bielitz, Austrian Silesia on April 11, 1860. He began his education at the University of Vienna and emigrated to Chicago in 1883.

Zeisler graduated from the Northwestern University School of Law in 1884.

== Personal life ==
In 1885 he married his second cousin Fannie Bloomfield, sister of philologist Maurice Bloomfield and the aunt of linguist Leonard Bloomfield. The Zeislers had three sons: Leonard Bloomfield Zeisler, Paul Bloomfield Zeisler, and Ernest Bloomfield Zeisler (married to Claire Zeisler). After Fannie Bloomfield-Zeisler's death in 1927, Zeisler married Amelia Spellman in 1930. He died at Michael Reese Hospital in Chicago on June 4, 1931.

== Professional career ==
In 1886-1887, Zeisler was co-counsel for the defendants in the anarchist cases, popularly known as the Haymarket cases. Zeisler was a progressive and was a member of the American Anti-Imperialist League, the Municipal Voters' League, and the Civil Service Reform Association.

Zeisler was a writer and lectured on legal topics. Zeisler was a member of the Chicago Literary Club, The Little Room, Book and Play and the Cliff Dwellers Club.

== Cases ==
- The Haymarket trials
- Heath & Milligan Mfg Co. v. Worst 207 U.S. 338 (1907) regarding lead-based paint.

== Publications ==
- "The Legal and Moral Aspects of Abortion", remarks at the 1910 meeting of the Chicago Gynecological Society, printed in the Journal of Surgery, Gynecology and Obstetrics, Vol. 10, No. 5, p. 539.
- Reminiscences Of The Anarchist Case (1927)
