= Claire Zeisler =

American artist (1903–1991)

- Zeisler circa 1980 with works from her Dimensional Fibers
- Born: Claire Block; April 18, 1903; Cincinnati, Ohio
- Died: September 30, 1991 (aged 88); Chicago, Illinois
- Known for: Fiber Arts
- Spouses: Harold Florsheim (m. 1921–1943) Ernest Zeisler (m. 1946)
- Relatives: Joan Florsheim Binkley (daughter); Peter Florsheim (son); Thomas Florsheim Sr. (son)

Claire Zeisler (April 18, 1903 – September 30, 1991) was an American fiber artist who expanded the expressive qualities of knotted and braided threads, pioneering large-scale freestanding sculptures in this medium. Throughout her career Zeisler sought to create "large, strong, single images" with fiber.

Zeisler's non-functional structures were constructed using traditional weaving and avant-garde off the loom techniques such as square knotting, wrapping, and stitching. Zeisler preferred to work with natural materials such as jute, sisal, raffia, hemp, wool, and leather. The textiles were often left un-dyed, evidence of Zeisler's preference for natural coloration that emphasized the fiber itself. When she did use color, she gravitated towards red.

Her work is influenced by and has influenced fiber artists in the 1960s and 1970s, including Kay Sekimachi, Lenore Tawney, Magdalena Abakanowicz, and Sheila Hicks. The resurgence of interest in fiber arts and macrame during the 2000s have inspired a new generation of knotters and creators, including Jim Olarte and Agnes Hansella.

== Biography ==
Claire Block was born in Cincinnati, Ohio, attended Columbia College Chicago for one year, then in 1921 married Harold Florsheim (son of Milton S. Florsheim and an heir to Florsheim Shoe). They had three children, Joan (née Florsheim) Fraerman Binkley (married to architect Leroy "Roy" Binkley), Peter Florsheim, and Thomas Florsheim, Sr. (who left the family company in 1964 to join Weyenberg Shoe Company, taking it over in 1977; in 2002, his sons Thomas Florsheim, Jr. and John Florsheim reacquired Florsheim Shoe Company in 2002 under Weyco ownership) before divorcing in 1943.

In 1946, she married physician and author Ernest Bloomfield Zeisler, the son of Fannie (née Bloomfield) Zeisler and Sigmund Zeisler. In the 1930s she bought works by Paul Klee, Joan Miró, Henry Moore, and Picasso, and as well as tribal objects including African sculptures, tantric art, ancient Peruvian textiles and more than 300 American Indian baskets. The ancient and ethnic textile cultures in Zeisler's private collection contrasted the textile culture in the West that became dominated by the mechanized loom after the Industrial Revolution. Instead of an emphasis on the utilization of textile making, avant-garde artists instead sought to revitalize the mechanized process through an emphasis on handcraft in which the artists gained "unmediated contact" with the materials. Zeisler's interest in working by hand using elementary construction techniques, common interests held by the avant-garde fiber artists in the 1960s/70s, often had "low culture connotations" of "utility, femininity, domesticity, amateurism, decorativeness, and even primitiveness."

Zeisler studied at the Chicago Institute of Design (formerly New Bauhaus) in the 1940s with Eugene Dana and the Illinois Institute of Technology where she was taught by the Russian avant-garde sculptor Alexander Archipenko and the Chicago weaver Bea Swartchild. In 1946, she attended the Summer Art Institute at Black Mountain College, studying color and design under Josef Albers.

Red Preview, a fiber construction Zeisler created in 1969

Zeisler's early work in the 1950s used conventional weaving techniques. Using the loom, Zeisler created place mats and textiles for use in apparel. By 1961, her work became increasingly experimental in the use of off-the-loom techniques that pushed the boundaries of traditional textile, making freestanding, three-dimensional fiber sculptures using a variety of techniques. She had her first solo exhibition, at the Chicago Public Library in that year (Jan. 2–30), at the age of 59. Zeisler’s first solo show was exhibited in the same year as Lenore Tawney’s “breakthrough” 1962 solo show at the Staten Island Museum. It was followed in the same year by an exhibition of her weavings and selections from her collection, at the Renaissance Society at the University of Chicago (Oct. 9–Nov. 6).

Zeisler became a celebrated innovator in fiber sculpture only after her inclusion in "Woven Forms," a seminal exhibition at the Museum of Contemporary Crafts in New York City in 1963 (Mar. 22 – May 12) and her introduction to knotting at the New York studio of Lili Blumenau. "Woven Forms" presented Zeisler's work alongside the work of four other women artists who were working to pioneer off-loom construction: Lenore Tawney, Sheila Hicks, Alice Adams, and Dorian Zachai. Erika Billeter, the exhibition's curator, named the show "Woven Forms" because there had yet to be a name to encompass the innovative textiles of the avant-garde artists. She writes, "However they were displayed, they were strange objects and opened completely novel possibilities for the art of textiles." "Woven Forms" received only one published response by the press, that of artist Louise Bourgeois who reviewed the show for Craft Horizons. Her response was negative and revealed many of the prejudices that came from fiber art's low culture connotations. Bourgeois wrote, "A painting or a sculpture makes great demand on the onlooker at the same time that it is independent of him. These weavings, delightful as they are, seem more engaging and less demanding. If they must be classified, they would fall somewhere between fine and applied art…The pieces in the show rarely liberate themselves from decoration."

Zeisler perceived that knotting, although at the time used mostly in developing nations and by sailors, could free her from the geometric and two-dimensional limitations of the loom and would allow her to work in three dimensions. With this technique she made freestanding sculptures as much as 96 inches tall, often incorporating both tightly knotted sections and free falls of threads that have been likened to water and hair. Her well-known Red Preview, in the collection of the Art Institute of Chicago, has been called "strikingly erotic in form, both phallic in its vertical thrust and labial in its organization." She also worked in other forms and techniques, including large constructed balls of wool and wrapped spiral Slinky toys, and she covered stones with buttonhole-stitch threads to create relics resembling the tribal artifacts she collected. In 1964, Zeisler showed with Lenore Tawney and Sheila Hicks at the Museum for Arts and Crafts in Zurich, Germany. European fiber artists up until the exhibit had been working in the tradition of flat loom tapestries, and even in comparison to Tawney and Hicks, Zeisler’s work departed the most drastically from this convention. In the 1970s, Zeisler worked with leather, manipulating the material through techniques that were reminiscent of those used in paper cutting, such as weaving, plaiting, stacking and folding. Zeisler also experimented in the making of art objects in the 1970s, with works such as Pages (1976) and Chapters (1976) that used stacks of textiles such as cotton and wool fleece to form thick shapes. Her "intimately scaled works" were created out of "materials both sensuous and secret." Her later structures are characterized by cascading strands of loose fiber that spill over the floor forming a tangle.

Zeisler's work was presented in retrospective exhibits in the Art Institute of Chicago (1979) and the Whitney Museum of American Art (1985). A retrospective exhibit was held at the Agnes Allerton Gallery in 1979 that displayed works of her career from 1961–1978. In 1982, Claire Zeisler was honored in New York City by the Women's Caucus for Art for her lifetime in art. The press release read, "We honor Claire Zeisler as a weaver of multidimensional forms and a builder of powerful presences. The ancient techniques of knotting and wrapping fibers have found new lie, and new meanings, in her hands."

== See also ==
- Fiber art
- Weaving
