= Everybody Sing (film) =

1938 film by Edwin L. Marin

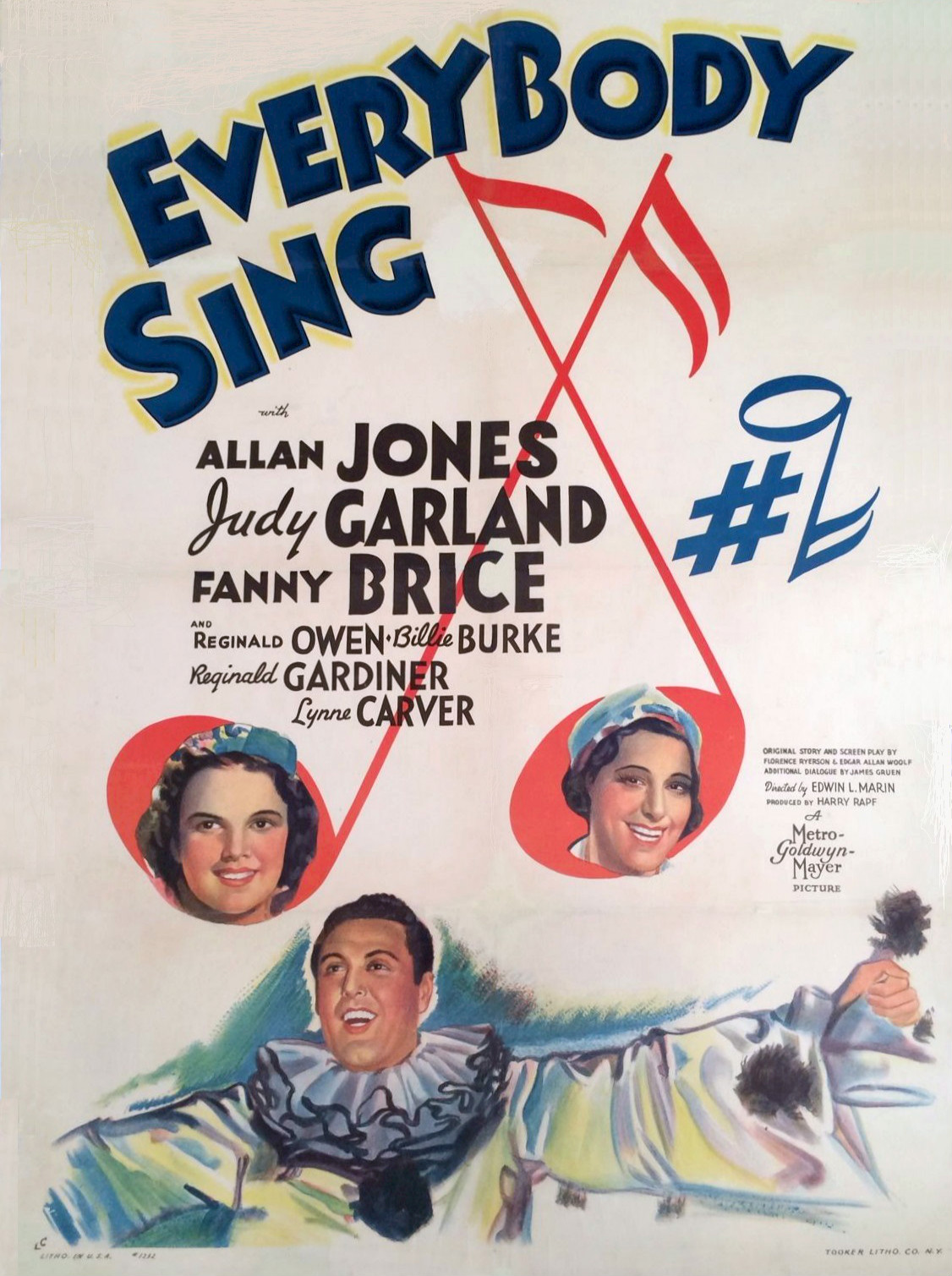
- Theatrical release poster
- Directed by: Edwin L. Marin
- Screenplay by: Florence Ryerson; Edgar Allan Woolf
- Story by: Florence Ryerson; Edgar Allan Woolf
- Produced by: Harry Rapf
- Starring: Allan Jones; Judy Garland; Fanny Brice
- Cinematography: Joseph Ruttenberg
- Edited by: William S. Gray
- Music by: William Axt (uncredited) {see article}
- Production company: Metro-Goldwyn-Mayer
- Distributed by: Loew's Inc.
- Release date: February 4, 1938
- Running time: 91 minutes
- Country: United States
- Language: English
- Budget: $795,000
- Box office: $1 million

Everybody Sing is a 1938 American musical comedy film directed by Edwin L. Marin, and starring Allan Jones, Judy Garland and Fanny Brice, and featuring Reginald Owen and Billie Burke. The screenplay and story by Florence Ryerson and Edgar Allan Woolf had additional work by James Gruen and Milton Merlin with uncredited contributions from Bert Kalmar, Harry Ruby and Dalton Trumbo.

A modest box office success, the film was a significant step in Garland's career, boosting her stardom at MGM and helping to secure perhaps her best known role in The Wizard of Oz the following year.

== Plot ==
Teenager Judy Bellaire (Judy Garland) has trouble fitting in at school. She frequently causes trouble by introducing her jazzy vocal style into her conservative music class and is expelled as a result. She returns home to her dysfunctional and financially challenged family, where her frustrated playwright-father (Reginald Owen), ditzy actress-mother (Billie Burke), and beautiful elder sister, Sylvia (Lynne Carver) compete for attention along with Olga, the funny Russian maid (Fanny Brice) and Ricky, the hunky singing cook (Allan Jones), who is in love with Sylvia. Judy foils her father's attempt to ship her off to school in Europe by escaping from the ship and then trying out for a musical show as a blackface singer, taking advantage of her love of jazz to enchant the show's producer, who hires her and makes her a star of his new show. Meanwhile, Ricky cuts a record, musically expressing his love for Sylvia. Nevertheless, Sylvia is forced into engagement with another man.

When Judy's distraught parents discover she is appearing in a musical show, Sylvia rejoins Ricky, who is also appearing in the show. Finally, all the cast members are reunited, including Olga, who finds her lost love, Boris. The film's happy ending includes an extravagant stage piece with gorgeously attired chorus girls, happily reunited parents and child, and the happy kiss between Sylvia and Ricky, who is now the producer of a successful musical show.

== Cast ==
- Allan Jones as Richard "Ricky" Saboni
- Judy Garland as Judy Bellaire
- Fanny Brice as Olga Chekaloff
- Billie Burke as Diana Bellaire
- Reginald Owen as Hillary Bellaire
- Lynne Carver as Sylvia Bellaire
- Reginald Gardiner as Jerrold Hope
- Monty Woolley as John "Jack" Fleming
- Helen Troy as Hillary's secretary
- Adia Kuznetzoff as Boris, the bus driver
- Henry Armetta as Signor Giovanni Vittorino, Cafe Nappo
- Michelette Burani as Madame Le Brouchette
- Mary Forbes as Miss Colvin

== Music ==
- "The One I Love" (Bronisław Kaper, Walter Jurmann and Gus Kahn)
- "(Down On) Melody Farm" (Kaper, Jurmann and Kahn)
- "Swing Mr. Mendelssohn"(Kaper, Jurmann and Kahn)
- "The Show Must Go On" (Kaper, Jurmann and Kahn)
- "Cosi-Cosa"(Kaper and Jurmann)
- "Quainty, Dainty Me" (Bert Kalmar and Harry Ruby)
- "Snooks (Why? Because!)" (Kalmar and Ruby)

Allan Jones sings a short arrangement of "Cosi-Cosa", a popular song by Kaper and Jurmann, which Jones had introduced a few years earlier in A Night at the Opera (1935).

The "Snooks" number is based on the character "Baby Snooks" played on Broadway and on the radio by Brice. The St. Brendan's Boys Choir, directed by Robert Mitchell, provided the singing voices for the schoolgirl chorus that backs Judy on her numbers.

The musical performances were staged by Dave Gould, except for "Quainty, Dainty Me", staged by Seymour Felix; the dance director was Val Raset. Brice's dancing was doubled by Iola Cochran.

== Production notes ==
Working titles for Everybody Sing were The Ugly Ducking – a reference to Garland's character – and Swing Fever. Principal photography took place from September 2–3, and then late September to December 21, 1937, with retakes on January 8–10, 1938.

After a stalled career, this was one of the films marking the picking up of momentum in Garland's ascent to stardom. Following the sensational audience reaction to her performance of "You Made Me Love You" to a picture of Clark Gable in Broadway Melody of 1938 (1937), she was rushed into shooting two films back to back, Thoroughbreds Don't Cry (1937) and this film, which was held for later release.

Everybody Sing was Jones' final film for MGM, and the first MGM appearance by Woolley.

According to TCM.com:

As important as the film itself in the development of Garland's career was a seven-week, seven-city promotional tour that started in Miami Beach and included stops in New York and Chicago. With Garland mentor Roger Edens accompanying her on the piano, she stepped alone for the first time onto huge stages to sing in front of adoring crowds and began to establish the audience rapport that would, in time, make her one [of] the world's greatest live entertainers.

== Reception ==
The reviewer for Film Weekly wrote that Garland's singing put the film into the "excellent" class, and that "Anyone who stands up to Miss Brice at her own comedy game is very good indeed."

According to MGM's records the film earned $655,000 in the US and Canada and $348,000 elsewhere, resulting in an overall loss of $174,000.
