= The One I Love (Allan Jones song) =

"The One I Love" is a popular song written by Bronisław Kaper and Walter Jurmann, with lyrics by Gus Kahn. The song was published in 1937, and introduced in the 1938 film Everybody Sing, starring Allan Jones, Judy Garland, and Fanny Brice. In the film the song was sung by Allan Jones and reprised by Jones and Lynne Carver.
