= Language (Bloomfield book) =

Book by Leonard Bloomfield

- Author: Leonard Bloomfield
- Language: English
- Subject: linguistics
- Genre: textbook
- Publisher: Henry Holt
- Publication date: 1933
- Media type: Print (hardcover)
- ISBN: 9781138868489

Language is an influential textbook by Leonard Bloomfield. It is described as "one of the most important general treatments of linguistic science in the first half of the 20th century and almost alone determined the subsequent course of linguistics in the United States".

== Content ==
Language is a complete revision, indeed a new writing, of Bloomfield's earlier book An Introduction to the Study of Language which had been published in 1914. Language became the foundation of a movement that later came to be known as structural linguistics and Bloomfield became a pioneer in general linguistics.

== See also ==
- Language, book by Edward Sapir
