= Lynne Carver =

American actress (1916–1954)

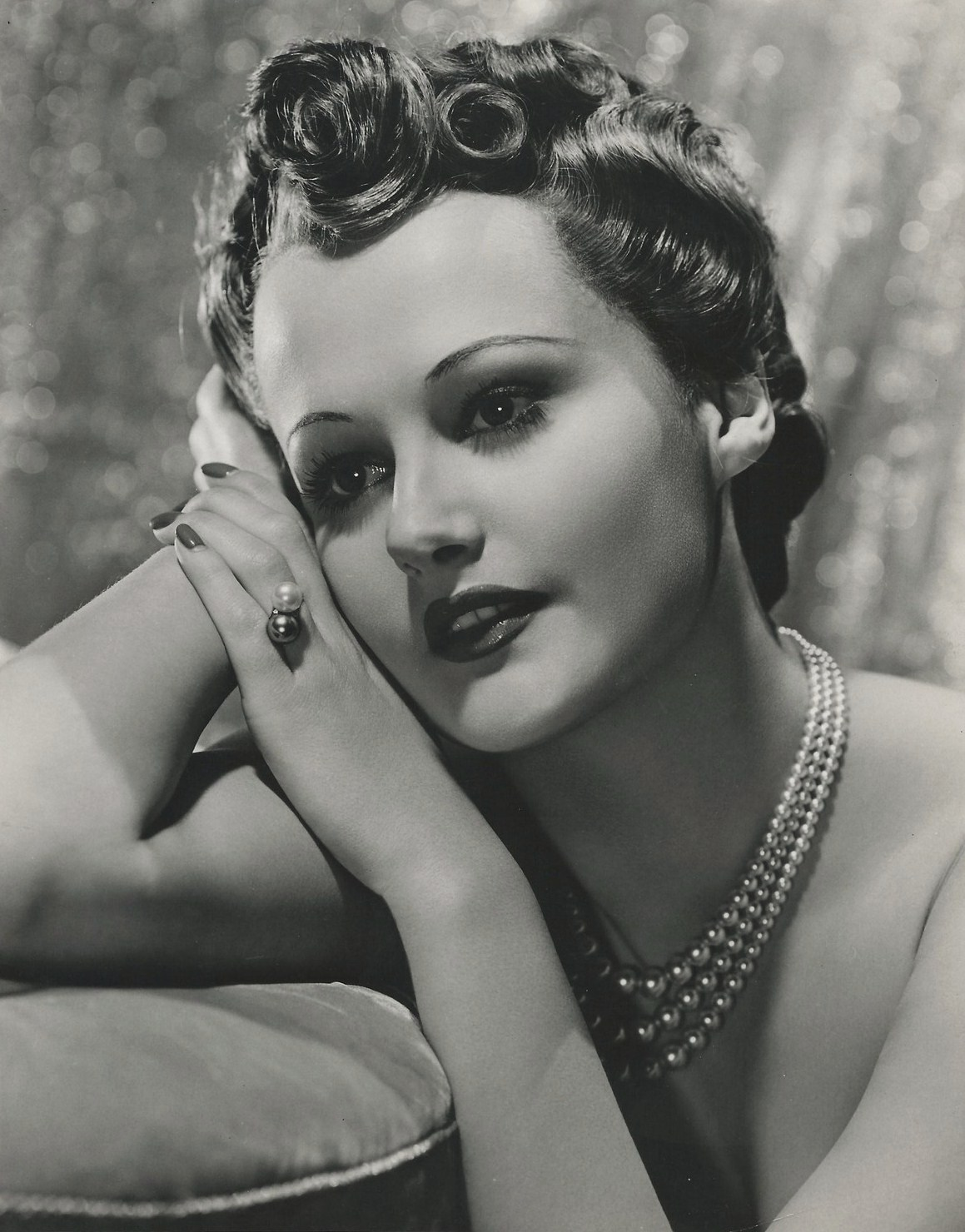
- Carver in 1938
- Born: Virginia Reid Sampson; September 13, 1916; Douglas, Arizona, U.S.
- Died: August 12, 1955 (aged 38); New York City, U.S.
- Occupation: Actress
- Years active: 1934–1948
- Spouse(s): Nicholas Nayfack (m. 1937; div. 1942) William Mullaney (m. 1948)

Lynne Carver (born Virginia Reid Sampson, September 13, 1916 – August 12, 1955) was an American film actress. She appeared in more than 40 films between 1933 and 1955.

== Early years ==
Carver was born in Lexington, Kentucky. Her father, Reid Johnson Sampson, was a mining engineer in Arizona and New Mexico for several years preceding World War I, and he and his family were briefly detained by Pancho Villa during one of the Mexican general's raids across the border into the Southwestern US, when Carver was an infant.

The Sampson family were prominent Kentuckians for several generations, where her grandfather, William Sampson, had served as Chief Justice of the Kentucky Supreme Court during the American Civil War.

Her older sister, Marjorie Lee Sampson, followed Virginia to Hollywood and landed a few small parts, but never achieved the status of her sister, and soon moved on.

Carver studied singing with contralto Amy Ellerman.

== Career ==
Carver went to Hollywood at a young age to pursue a career in acting after winning a beauty pageant. Early on she was billed as Virginia Reid with RKO Pictures and can be seen in several musicals as one of the "Goldwyn Girls". She dated Howard Hughes, briefly, in the 1930s, before moving on to MGM as Lynne Carver where she became a regular in their stable of actresses. In a 1938 interview, she explained her name change by saying, "I wanted to keep some sort of family name ... Finally my father suggested two, Lynn and Craven. I added the 'e' to the first and changed the last one to Carver because we didn't like Craven much."

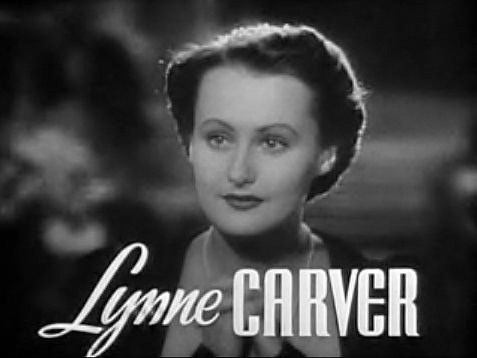
Carver in the trailer for Madame X

First playing minor bit parts, Carver eventually moved up to the level of ingenue in a few of her later roles. As her career advanced, she appeared in several films with Fred Astaire and Ginger Rogers, and was probably best known for her role as Alice Raymond in the early Dr. Kildare films. She was Barbara in the magical musical production Maytime in 1937 along with Nelson Eddy and Jeanette MacDonald and also appeared with them in Bitter Sweet, a 1940 attempt to recapture the success of Maytime. Two of her better known MGM performances are as Sylvia Bellaire in the 1938 musical comedy film, Everybody Sing starring Allan Jones and Judy Garland, and as Bess, Scrooge's nephew's fiancée, in A Christmas Carol starring Reginald Owen as Ebenezer Scrooge. Both films were released in 1938. Her last film for MGM was Tennessee Johnson which starred Van Heflin as the 17th President of the United States. Carver played Martha, the daughter of Andrew Johnson.

The slowdown of work in Hollywood due to World War II caused her career to stall. During and after the war, she played mostly in Republic westerns with Roy Rogers and Johnny Mack Brown and other more obscure films, but never achieved the level of success she had known earlier.

== Personal life ==
On March 31, 1936, Carver married dentist Ralph McClung in Selma, Alabama. They had divorced by mid-December 1936. She married Nicholas Nayfack in 1937 and they divorced in 1942. She was married to theatrical agent William Mullaney, lived in New York, and had a busy stage and TV career until 1954.

== Death ==
Carver died at Memorial Hospital in New York City after a year-long battle with cancer, on August 12, 1955, aged 38.

== Filmography ==
| Year | Title | Role | Starring | Notes |
|---|---|---|---|---|
| 1934 | Down to Their Last Yacht | Singer in Quartet | | Uncredited |
| 1934 | Kid Millions | Goldwyn Girl | | Uncredited |
| 1936 | Murder on a Honeymoon | Actress Holding Parrot | | Uncredited |
| 1936 | Roberta | Fashion Model | | Uncredited |
| 1936 | Strangers All | Blonde Actress in Film | | Uncredited |
| 1936 | Hooray for Love | Jane – with College Boy | | Uncredited |
| 1936 | Old Man Rhythm | College Girl | | Uncredited |
| 1936 | To Beat the Band | Minor Role | | |
| 1937 | Maytime | Barbara Roberts | Jeanette MacDonald and Nelson Eddy | |
| 1937 | Madame X | Helene | | |
| 1937 | The Bride Wore Red | Maddelena Monti | | |
| 1938 | Everybody Sing | Sylvia Bellaire | | |
| 1938 | Young Dr. Kildare | Alice Raymond | | |
| 1938 | A Christmas Carol | Bess | | |
| 1939 | The Adventures of Huckleberry Finn | Mary Jane | | |
| 1939 | Within the Law | June | | |
| 1939 | Calling Dr. Kildare | Alice Raymond | | |
| 1940 | Broadway Melody of 1940 | Emmy Lou Lee | | |
| 1940 | Sporting Blood | Joan Lockwood | | |
| 1940 | Dulcy | Angela Forbes | | |
| 1940 | Bitter Sweet | Dolly | | |
| 1941 | Mr. District Attorney in the Carter Case | Joyce Belmont | | |
| 1942 | Man from Cheyenne | Marian Hardy | | |
| 1942 | Yokel Boy | Vera Valaize | | |
| 1942 | Sunset on the Desert | Ann Kirby | | |
| 1942 | Tennessee Johnson | Martha Lincoln | | |
| 1943 | The Human Comedy | Daughter Beaufrere | | Uncredited |
| 1943 | Presenting Lily Mars | Bonnie - Showgirl | | Uncredited |
| 1944 | Law of the Valley | Ann Jennings | | |
| 1945 | Flame of the West | Abbie Compton | | |
| 1947 | Drifting Along | Pat McBride | | |
| 1948 | Crossed Trails | Maggie Flynn | | |
