= Stacy Adams Shoe Company =

American menswear brand

- Industry: Apparel
- Founded: 1875; 151 years ago in Brockton, Massachusetts
- Founders: William H. Stacy; Henry L. Adams
- Parent: Weyco Group
- Website: stacyadams.com

Stacy Adams is an American brand of menswear including suits, sleepwear, underwear, sportswear, jewelry, and shoes, with an emphasis on urban fashions, including styles resembling modern zoot suits, as well as more casual hip-hop clothing.

Stacy Adams is currently owned by Glendale, Wisconsin-based Weyco Group.

== History ==
The Stacy Adams Shoe Company was founded in 1875 in Brockton, Massachusetts by William H. Stacy and Henry L. Adams.

== In popular culture ==
Morris Day, front man of the Minneapolis-based funk and soul band The Time, is known for his large collection of Stacy Adams shoes. He mentions the brand by name in The Time's 1982 song "The Walk", from the album What Time Is It?: "I'm about to walk a hole in my Stacy Adams." In Graffiti Bridge (film), a character played by Morris mentions the shoe brand in the line: "You better put some treble on that tone, or you're gonna be pulling some Stacy Adams out your ass." Rapper Coolio mentioned the shoe brand in his song "1,2,3,4 (Sumpin' New)" from the 1995 album Gangsta's Paradise: "Comin' at 'em with a pattern and a fresh pair a' Adams." It was also used as a reference in Snoop Dogg's song "Stacey Adams" featuring Kokane from the album The Last Meal in 1999. Tom Waits also references "my Stacy's are soaking wet" in his song "Tom Traubert's Blues/Waltzing Matilda", from the album Small Change, released in 1976 by Asylum Records. Also on the album Nighthawks at the Diner, in the track "Spare Parts", Tom Waits has the lyrics " I wiped my Stacy Adams, and I jackknifed my legs". Ryan Gosling's character in Drive (2011 film) wore a pair of the Stacy Adams Madison Cap Toe Boot (in taupe).
