= A Vedic Word Concordance =

Multi-volume concordance of Vedic Sanskrit texts

A Vedic Word Concordance (Sanskrit: Vaidika-Padānukrama-Koṣa) is a multi-volume concordance of the corpus of Vedic Sanskrit texts. It has been under preparation from 1930 and was published in 1935–1965 under the guidance of Viśvabandhu Śāstrī (1897–1973), with an introduction in Sanskrit and English. It aims to be "a universal vocabulary register" of "Vedic works, with complete textual reference and critical commentary bearing on phonology, accent, etymo-morphology, grammar, metre, text-criticism, and Ur-Aryan philology".

== Contents ==
The work covers 123,000 word-bases and 5,000,000 word forms found in about 400 Vedic and Vedanga texts, including Samhitas, Brahmanas, Aranyakas and Upanishads (even very late ones). The Vedanga section does not cover all the published Shrauta or Grihya texts, however, while the Upanishad section also includes the Bhagavad Gita.

The concordance extends to about 11,000 pages, published in 16 parts:

- Section: Samhitas (6 parts), 1942–1963.
- Section II: Brahmanas and Aranyakas (2 parts), 1935–36
- Section III: Upanishads (2 parts), 1945
- Section IV: Vedangas (4 parts), 1958–1961
- Index (2 parts), 1964–65.

A revised and enlarged edition was published 1973–1976.

== History of development ==
Viśvabandhu Śāstrī continued the work of Vishveshvaranand and Nityanand, who had published word indices to the four Vedic Samhitas in 1908–1910, leading the Vishveshvaranand Institute from 1924 until his death in 1973.

After the partition of India, the institute moved to its present premises at Sadhu Ashram, Hoshiarpur, Punjab, India. Most of the approximately 6000 Sanskrit manuscripts formerly located at the Dayanand College of Lahore were clandestinely brought to Hoshiarpur at the time. Since 1965, the institute has been incorporated in the Panjab University, Chandigarh as the Vishveshvaranand Institute of Sanskrit and Indological Studies (VISIS).

Based on the Vedic Word Concordance, the institute currently compiles a Dictionary of Vedic Interpretation, of which the first volume, running up to the lemma Agni, has been completed.

== Editions ==
- Vishva Bandhu, Bhim Dev, S. Bhaskaran Nair (eds.), Vaidika-Padānukrama-Koṣa: A Vedic Word-Concordance, Vishveshvaranand Vedic Research Institute, Hoshiarpur, 1963–1965.

== Related works ==
- Bloomfield, Maurice (1990). A Vedic Concordance. Motilal Banarsidass Publ. ISBN 81-208-0654-9.
- Bloomfield, Maurice; Edgerton; Franklin, Emeneau M. B. (1930). Vedic variants : a study of the variant readings in the repeated mantras of the Veda. University of Pennsylvania. OCLC 13965411.
- Franceschini, Marco (2008). A New Vedic Concordance (2 volumes and CD). Harvard Oriental Series Volume 66.
