= Lillian Florsheim =

American sculptor (1896–1988)

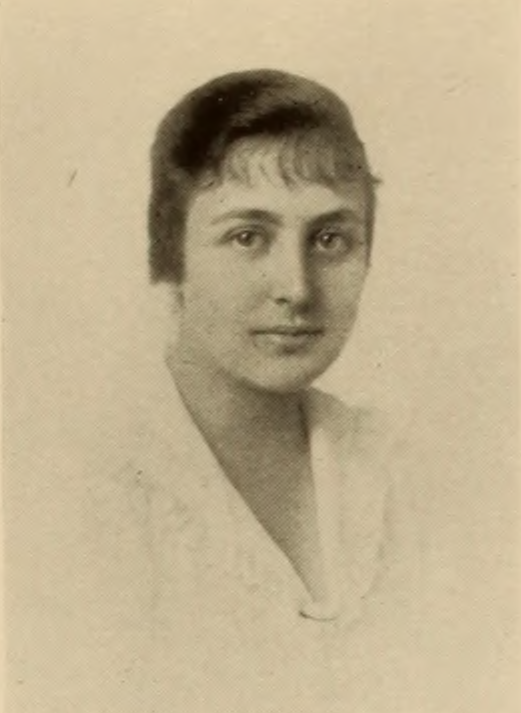
- Born: May 17, 1896; New Orleans
- Died: December 28, 1988; Chicago
- Occupation: Sculptor

Lillian Florsheim (née Lillian Hyman; May 17, 1896 – December 28, 1988) was an American sculptor whose work was displayed in the Art Institute of Chicago and museums in Washington, D.C. and New Orleans.

== Early life and education ==
Lillian Hyman was born on May 17, 1896 in New Orleans, Louisiana to Clara Newman and Harris Hyman. Hyman was one of four children, with sisters Nettie and Claire and a brother, Harris Hyman, Jr. She attended Smith College in Massachusetts and graduated in 1916. In 1918, Hyman married Irving Florsheim, a navy officer and heir (along with his brother, Harold) to the Florsheim Shoe Company. The Florsheims had two children, Nancy Goldberg née Florsheim, restaurant owner and manager whom married artist Bertrand Goldberg and Mary Florsheim Picking, who was married to actor Allan Jones.

== Career ==
Florsheim's art career and studies began in the late 1940s, around the time of her divorce from Irving Florsheim. Her career began in 50s and continued into her 80s; she first began her studies taking painting courses taught by Rudolph Weisenborn and George Buehle. However, after viewing the work of Max Bill at the Art Institute of Chicago, Florsheim became more interested in abstract work and enrolled in classes at the Institute of Design with Hugo Weber in 1951. While there, she took an interest in three-dimensional studies.

Between the 1950s and 80s, Florsheim created a body of work with more than 200 sculptures. She used a variety of materials, methods, and techniques throughout her creations. During the 1950s, she created abstracted figures, string study models, and utilitarian objects in Plexiglas. By the mid-60s, her sculptures became more abstract and complex studies of form and by the 70s, her work evolved further into strong geometric constructions using rods and planes and her works grew larger. In 1970, Florsheim had a significant show at the Museum of Contemporary Art in Chicago, followed by a three-year break. When she returned to her work, she focused on more intimate pieces.

== Personal life ==
In 1946, purchased a home on Chicago's Gold Coast designed by architect Andrew Rebori in 1938. The home was constructed for Rebori's own use and included a coach house in the rear. The same year, Florsheim's daughter Nancy, married artist Bertrand Goldberg. He would renovate Lillian's home to display her art, design her studio space, and designed a kitchen as a bridge to join the main house and carriage house together. The kitchen was featured in the Chicago Tribune and Home and Garden due to its unique design and color scheme of black, white, and stainless steel, which made small bridge space feel larger. Florsheim maintained a close with Nancy and Goldberg throughout her life, and the pair moved close to whom moved a few blocks from Lillian's home in 1955, and took over the Rebori home following her death.

In the 1940s, Florsheim began to amass her own collection of art. She was particularly interested in abstract art and she knew and maintained relationships with many of the artists she collected. Her collection included works from Georges Vantongerloo, Barbara Hepworth, Naum Gabo, Jean Arp, Isamu Noguchi, and Victor Vasarely.

== Death and legacy ==
Lillian Florsheim died on December 28, 1988, in Chicago, IL at the age of 92. Between 1965 and 1985, Florsheim had more than 15 solo shows around the world including in Chicago, Germany, Israel, France, and New Orleans.

Florsheim's work is held in both public and private collections including:

- Art Institute of Chicago
- Hirshhorn Museum, Washington, D.C.
- Smithsonian Museum, Washington D.C.
- Wilhelm-Hack-Museum, Ludwigshafen, Germany
- Longue Vue, New Orleans, LA
