= Florsheim Shoe Company Building =

Former shoe factory in Chicago, Illinois

Coordinates: 41.9389°N 87.7266°W

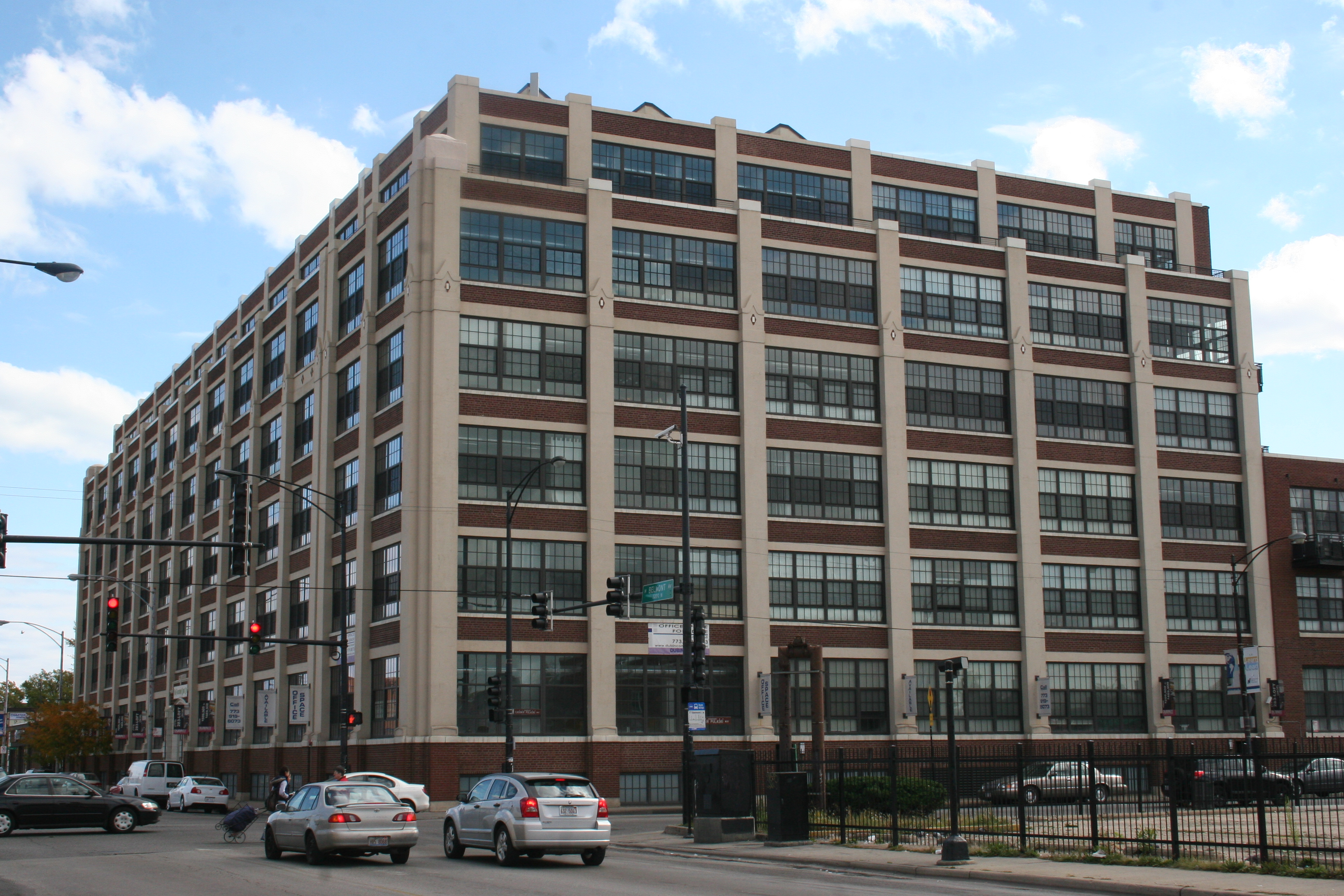
The building in 2012

The Florsheim Shoe Company Building is a former shoe factory at 3963 West Belmont Avenue in the Avondale community area of Chicago, Illinois. Constructed from 1924 to 1926 for the Florsheim Shoe Company and designed by Alfred S. Alschuler, the six-story reinforced-concrete building is an example of early-20th-century industrial architecture. It was converted into condominiums and rental apartments in 2005 as the Shoemaker Lofts. The Commission on Chicago Landmarks designated it a Chicago Landmark on March 29, 2006.

== History ==
Milton Florsheim founded Florsheim & Co. in Chicago in 1892. After the company opened a four-story factory at 3927 West Belmont Avenue in 1919, it obtained a permit in 1924 for the larger factory immediately to its west; the six-story building opened in 1926.

The International Shoe Company acquired Florsheim in 1953. Its successor, Interco, sold the Belmont building to Records Management Services in 1986.

== Architecture ==
The building has a reinforced-concrete frame whose structural grid is visible on the exterior, with red-brick infill panels and large, multipaned industrial-sash windows. The top story is set back to form a penthouse, and the Belmont Avenue entrance is framed by terra-cotta and geometric ornament. Its extensive window area and concrete frame are characteristic of the daylight-factory type, intended to admit natural light to workspaces while allowing flexible interior layouts.

== Landmark designation ==
The Commission on Chicago Landmarks designated the building a Chicago Landmark on March 29, 2006. The designation recognized its association with Chicago manufacturing, its early-20th-century industrial design, its association with Alschuler, and its visual presence at the Belmont–Pulaski intersection.
