= The Firefly (1937 film) =

1937 film by Joseph M. Newman, Robert Zigler Leonard

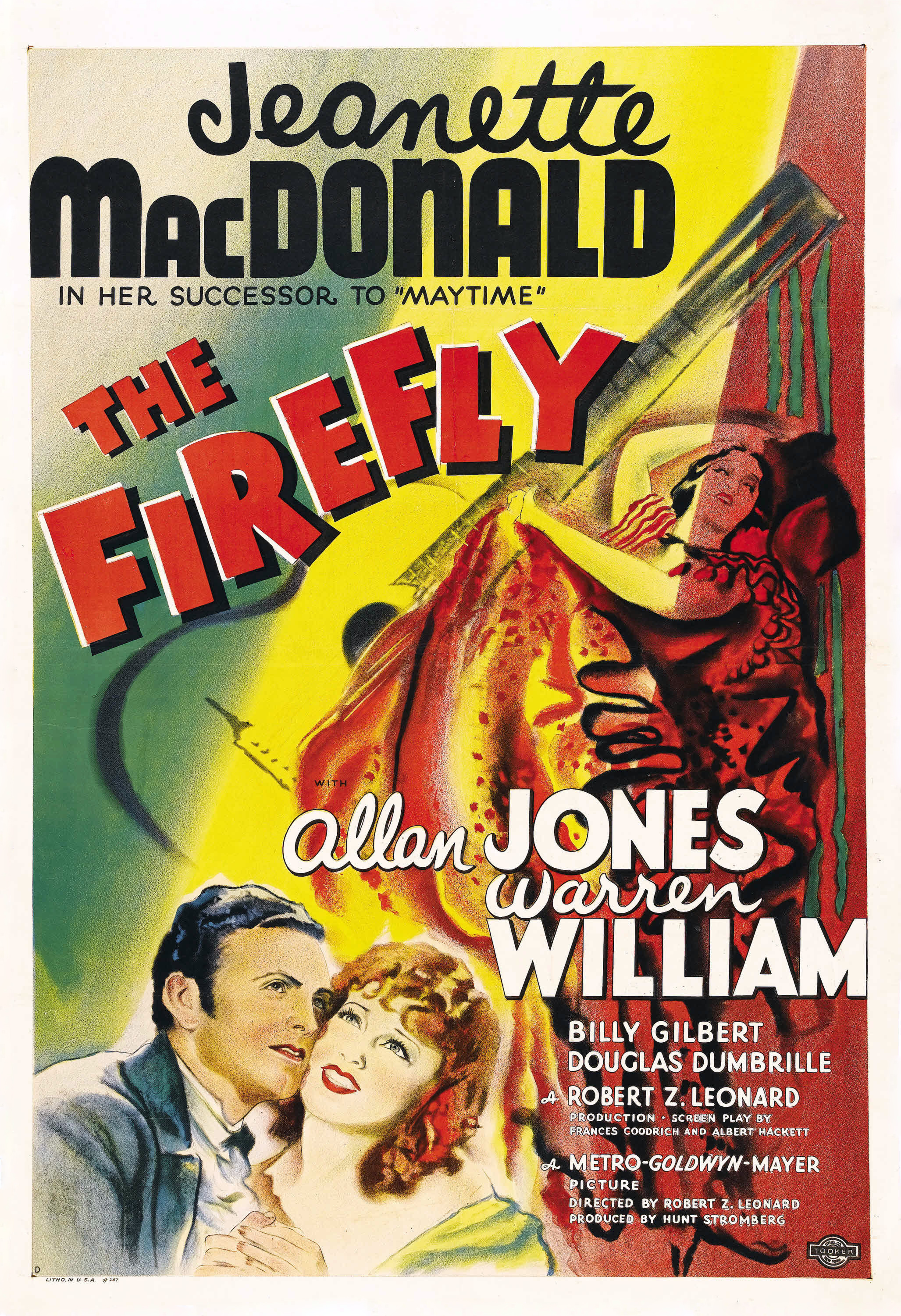
- Directed by: Robert Z. Leonard
- Screenplay by: Frances Goodrich; Albert Hackett; Ogden Nash
- Based on: The Firefly; 1912 operetta by Otto A. Harbach
- Produced by: Robert Z. Leonard; Hunt Stromberg
- Starring: Jeanette MacDonald; Allan Jones; Warren William
- Cinematography: Oliver T. Marsh
- Edited by: Robert Kern
- Music by: Herbert Stothart; Rudolf Friml
- Production company: Metro-Goldwyn-Mayer
- Distributed by: Loew's Inc.
- Release date: September 1, 1937
- Running time: 131 minutes
- Country: United States
- Language: English
- Budget: $1,495,000
- Box office: $1,244,000 (Domestic earnings) $1,430,000 (Foreign earnings)

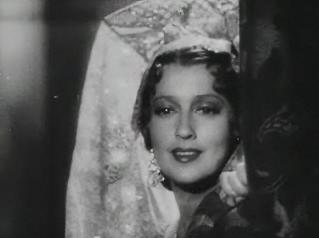
Jeanette MacDonald in the film's trailer

The Firefly is a 1937 American historical musical film directed by Robert Z. Leonard and starring Jeanette MacDonald, Allan Jones and Warren William. The film is an adaptation of the operetta of the same name by composer Rudolf Friml and librettist Otto A. Harbach that premiered on Broadway in 1912. The film used nearly all of the music from the operetta but jettisoned the plot in favor of a new storyline set in Spain during the time of the Emperor Napoleon I. It added a new song, "The Donkey Serenade" (a reworking by Herbert Stothart of Friml's 1918 orchestral piece 'Chanson'), which became extremely popular, as was one of the Friml songs, "Giannina Mia". The original release prints of the film were elaborately tinted with Sepia-Blue, Sepia-Orange and Sepia-Blue-Pink.

== Plot ==
During the Peninsular War, secret agent Nina Maria Azara works undercover for Spanish King Ferdinand VII as a singer known as the "Firefly." She is much admired by French soldiers ("Danse Jeanette"), her unwitting sources of intelligence. During a performance ("Life is like a Firefly"), Nina Maria flirts with "Don Diego," who―unknown to her―is actually Captain Andre of French Intelligence. In return, he sings a tribute to her ("A Woman’s Kiss").

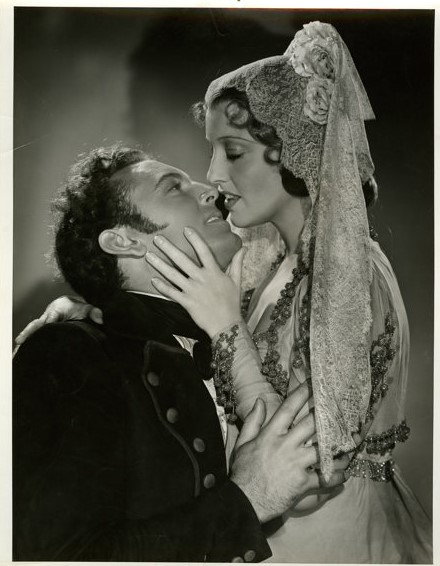
Jeanette MacDonald and Allan Jones as Nina Maria and Captain Andre/Don Diego.

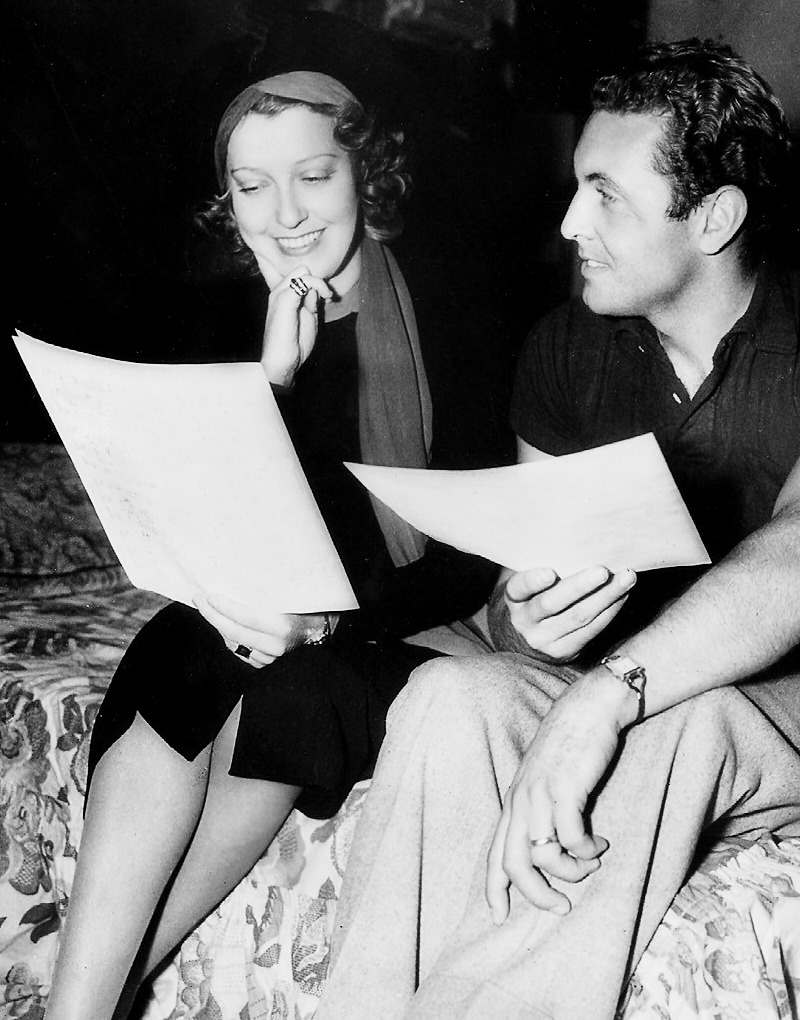
Jeanette MacDonald and Allan Jones backstage on the set of The Firefly.

To her intelligence chief, the Marqués de Melito, Nina Maria reports that Napoleon is sending 30,000 more troops against the Allies. Alarmed, Melito orders her to determine whether King Ferdinand's Bayonne meeting to discuss terms with Napoleon is a trap.

On her way to Vitoria, Nina Maria is followed by "Don Diego," who expresses ardent admiration. While she discourages the unwanted escort, he serenades her mule instead ("The Donkey Serenade"), amusing her.

At the Vitoria inn, a contact instructs that a vendor in the Bayonne market will provide carrier pigeons upon hearing a password. "Don Diego," presents himself during her dinner ("Para la Salud"), arranging for musicians to entertain her ("Ojos Rojos"). Andre charms her by pretend-romancing her in Venice ("Giannina Mia"); nevertheless, she instructs him away to await her in Madrid.

In Bayonne, Nina Maria entertains French troops ("He Who Loves and Runs Away") when she sees the persistent Andre and Colonel de Rouchemont arrive independently. Rouchemont, Napoleon’s aide, asks her to dinner at the chateau.

Nina Maria receives two carrier pigeons from her contact. "Don Diego" asks why a Spaniard is so friendly with the French. Her locket holds portraits of her parents, killed when the French invaded Spain 20 years before, but she replies it was long ago ("Sympathy").

When Andre asks Nina Maria whether she loves him, she replies that she does. Trumpets announce Napoleon’s arrival, and she says she must keep an appointment. Andre urges her not to go with Rouchemont; she gives him her locket as a love token. Nina Maria goes to the chateau ("When a Maid Comes Knocking at Your Heart"), where she sees Rouchemont’s papers revealing that the Spanish king is being lured to France to be arrested.

Noticing by their markings that the carrier pigeons have been substituted for French-trained ones, she realizes she is suspected as a spy. She suspects "Don Diego" might be a counterspy, particularly upon learning that the pigeon vendor has been arrested.

While the French Intelligence Chief listens, concealed in a closet, Nina Maria asks "Don Diego" to take a message to Vitoria. The Chief reveals the identity of Captain Andre, who first suspected her as an agent. Upon opening her message, however, they find a dinner order. Her test deftly avoided the trap, giving them no proof against her. As she departs France, Andre returns her locket, regrets his betrayal, and affirms that he loves her. She spurns him for being French.

Ferdinand VII abdicates, and Joseph Bonaparte rules as king of Spain as five years pass. French troops outnumber the Allies 80,000 to 50,000 and a strategic advantage is needed ("English March"). Undercover, Nina Maria again entertains French soldiers ("Capriccio Espagnol" Asturian folk dance origins). When Rouchemont sends for her, she claims the Spanish ostracized her for being a French sympathizer. While arranging a change of clothes for her, he catches her taking papers out of the lining of her ragged coat. The papers contain an accurate map of the French lines with code asking for verification. Andre, surprised to see Nina Maria, informs Rouchemont that the code indicates an attack in 5 hours. Rouchemont orders their entire formation changed, and the French send a deceptive message via Allied pigeons verifying the former positions.

Visiting Nina Maria in prison, Andre declares his love for her. As the Battle of Vitoria begins, she admits she was caught intentionally so the French would change their impregnable defensive positions, thus enabling Wellington and the Allies to win. During the battle, Andre is wounded severely ("I Love You Don Diego"). Nina Maria is rescued by Melito, who announces the French have retreated and the war is over. Nina Maria finds Andre among the hospital wounded; on his recovery, they set out joyfully for a life together ("Finale").

== Cast ==
- Jeanette MacDonald as Nina Maria Azara
- Allan Jones as Don Diego / Captain André
- Warren William as Colonel de Rouchemont
- Billy Gilbert as Inn Keeper
- Douglass Dumbrille as Marqués de Melito
- Henry Daniell as General Savary
- Leonard Penn as Etienne du Bois
- Tom Rutherford as King Ferdinand
- Belle Mitchell as Lola
- George Zucco as Saint-Clair, Secret Service Chief
- Corbet Morris as Duvall
- Matthew Boulton as Duke of Wellington
- Riley Hill (credited as Roy Harris) - Lieutenant
- Frank Campeau as Beggar (uncredited)
- Alan Curtis as Soldier (uncredited)
- Brandon Hurst as General (uncredited)

== Musical numbers ==
- DANSE JEANETTE
  - Written by Herbert Stothart
  - Danced by Jeanette MacDonald
  - Sung by Jeanette MacDonald
- LOVE IS LIKE A FIREFLY
  - Music by Rudolf Friml
  - Lyrics by Otto A. Harbach, Bob Wright and Chet Forrest
  - Sung by Jeanette MacDonald
- A WOMAN'S KISS
  - Music by Rudolf Friml
  - Lyrics by Bob Wright and Chet Forrest
  - Sung by Allan Jones
  - Backgroung vocal by Jeanette MacDonald
- THE DONKEY SERENADE
  - Music by Bob Wright, Chet Forrest, and Herbert Stothart, adapted from "Chanson" by Rudolf Friml
  - Lyrics by Bob Wright and Chet Forrest
  - Sung by Allan Jones
- PARA LA SALUD
  - Arranged by Herbert Stothart
  - Danced by Jeanette MacDonald
- OJOS ROJOS (uncredited)
  - Argentine Folk Song
  - Arranged by Manuel Alvarez Maciste
  - Played by Manuel Alvarez Maciste
- GIANNINA MIA
  - Music by Rudolf Friml
  - Lyrics by Otto A. Harbach
  - Sung by Allan Jones
- HE WHO LOVES AND RUNS AWAY
  - Music by Rudolf Friml
  - Lyrics by Gus Kahn
  - Sung by Jeanette MacDonald
- SYMPATHY
  - Music by Rudolf Friml
  - Lyrics by Otto A. Harbach
  - Sung by Jeanette MacDonald
- WHEN A MAID COMES KNOCKING AT YOUR HEART
  - Music by Rudolf Friml
  - Lyrics by Otto A. Harbach, Bob Wright & Chet Forrest
  - Sung by Jeanette MacDonald
- ENGLISH MARCH
  - Sung by Chorus
- I LOVE YOU DON DIEGO
  - Music by Rudolf Friml
  - Lyrics by Otto A. Harbach
  - Sung by Jeanette MacDonald
- THE DONKEY SERENADE
  - Music by Rudolf Friml and Herbert Stothart
  - Lyrics by Bob Wright and Chet Forrest
  - Sung by Jeanette MacDonald and Allan Jones
- FINALE: "GIANNINA MIA"
  - Music by Rudolf Friml
  - Lyrics by Otto A. Harbach
  - Sung by Jeanette MacDonald and Allan Jones

== Critical reception ==
Modern Screen’s Leo Townsend described the film as "a delightful and captivating musical which will more than please lovers of this type of entertainment." He wrote positively of the two lead performances: "The picture shows Jeanette MacDonald definitely improving as an actress. Besides her unusual excellent vocal work, it offers her a chance to exhibit her dancing talent. In the male lead, Allan Jones is a surprise hit. He is in fine voice, and his pleasant personality makes him certain star material. Because Jones is so outstanding, the Nelson Eddy fans won't be too disappointed at the absence of Nelson as Jeanette's singing partner."

Photoplay also noted the absence of Nelson Eddy and commented that the strong performance of Allan Jones offered proof that MacDonald could be successfully paired with other leading men. Although writing that the "pace is slow and uneven and dialogue is sometimes saccharine", it described the film as a "spectacular production" in which MacDonald "somehow manages to be more beautiful than ever." It noted that "the entire picture is sentimental fantasy and as such is refreshingly without a moral message … it’s genuinely good entertainment."
