= Weyco Group =

American fashion company

- Type: Public
- Traded as: Nasdaq: WEYS; Russell 2000 Component
- Industry: Footwear
- Founded: 1892
- Headquarters: Glendale, Wisconsin
- Key people: Thomas W. Florsheim Jr., CEO
- Revenue: ▲US$$320.5 million (2014)
- Net income: ▲US$19.8 million (2014)
- Number of employees: 640
- Subsidiaries: Florsheim Shoes, The Combs Company, Nunn Bush Shoe
- Website: www.weycogroup.com

Weyco Group (formerly Weyenberg Shoe Manufacturing Company or W. R. P. Shoe Company) is an American footwear company that designs, markets and distributes brand names including Florsheim, Nunn Bush, Stacy Adams, BOGS, Rafters and Umi. The company, which focuses on North American wholesale and retail distribution, has been assembled by a series of acquisitions.

== History ==
In 1964, after an estrangement with his father Harold Florsheim, son of company founder Milton S. Florsheim, Thomas Florsheim Sr. left the Florsheim Shoe Company and invested $750,000 in the Weyenberg Shoe Manufacturing Company, becoming partners with Frank Weyenberg. They acquired Nunn Bush and Stacy Adams, while developing the new Brass Boot line in Europe. When the Florsheim Group filed for Chapter 11 bankruptcy in 2002, Weyco purchased some of the company's assets. Weyco acquired Umi in 2010, and in 2011 it acquired The Combs Company and its BOGS and Rafters footwear brands. Weyco is led by Thomas Florsheim Jr. (the great-grandson of Milton S. Florsheim).

== Current business ==
The company focuses on two business segments in North America: wholesale and retail. The business entails mid-priced leather dress shoes; synthetic and leather casual footwear; outdoor boots, shoes, and sandals. Its wholesale customers are footwear, department, and specialty stores primarily in the United States and Canada. As of June 2015, it had 16 company-owned retail stores in the United States in addition to an internet business. For 2014, the company posted overall net sales of $320.5 million of which $243.4 million came from wholesale in North America and $23.3 million from North American retail.

Thomas W. Florsheim Jr. is the current CEO.

== See also ==
- Weyenberg Shoe Factory: a former factory in Beaver Dam, Wisconsin
