= The Allen House (Westport, Connecticut) =

Historic house in Connecticut, United States

- U.S. National Register of Historic Places
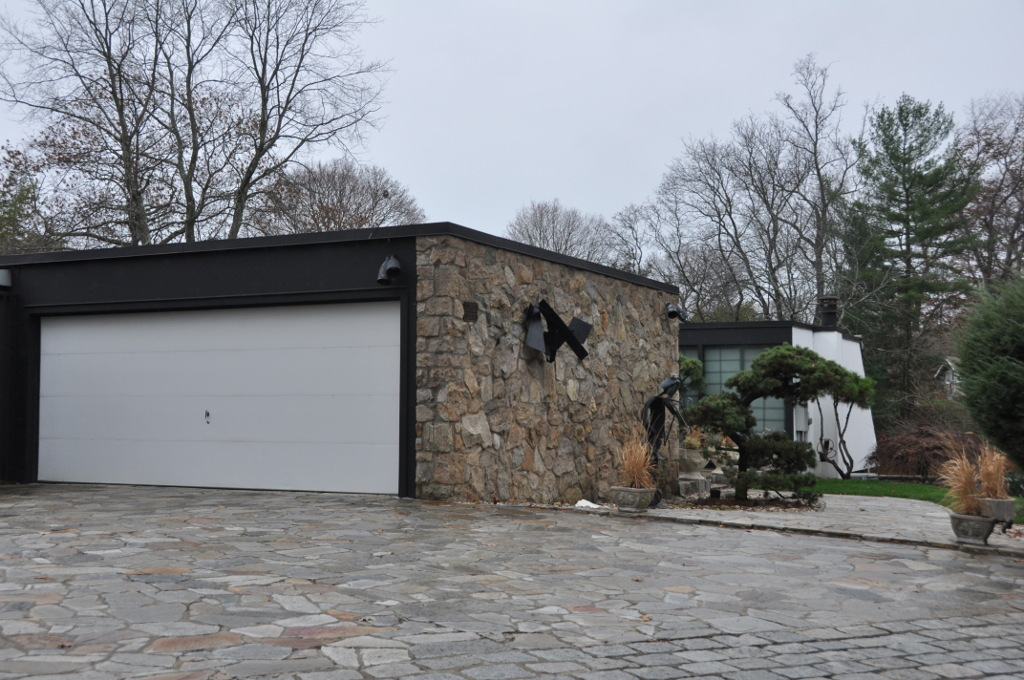

- Location within Connecticut Location within the United States
- Interactive map showing the location of Allen House
- Location: 4 Burritt's Landing North, Westport
- Coordinates: 41°6′57″N 73°22′32″W
- Area: 1.1 acres (0.45 ha)
- Built: 1958
- Architectural style: Mid-Century Modern
- NRHP reference No.: 10000492
- Added to NRHP: July 22, 2010

The Allen House is a historic house at 4 Burritt's Landing North in Westport, Connecticut. Built in 1958, it is the only known example in Westport of work by Chicago architect Roy Binkley, Jr., and is a good example of Bauhaus-style mid-20th Century Modern architecture. It was listed on the National Register of Historic Places in 2010.

== Description and history ==
The Allen House is located in southwestern Westport, on 1.1 acres (0.45 ha) set between Burritt's Landing North (a private lane) and Saugatuck Avenue (Route 136). The house is set near the northern edge of the property, overlooking a small pond. It is a single-story wood-frame structure, its exterior finished in fieldstone, redwood, and glass. It is covered by a flat roof. The house is in the shape of an H, with two substantial wings connected by a central hyphen. The main entrance is on one side of the hyphen, and a private courtyard with views of the pond is on the other side. The west wing houses the public rooms as well as the master bedroom, and has a lower level open to the pond due to the sloping terrain. The east wing houses the garage, a guest bedroom, and library.

The house was built in 1958 to a design by the Chicago-based architect Roy Binkley, Jr., a protegé of Mies van der Rohe. It was built for Ernst and Marcia Peterson Herrmann. The property was originally landscaped by Frank Okamura, but only a few elements of his design survive. The only notable alteration to the house has been the addition of retractable awnings on the extensive south-facing facades to shelter them from the summer sun.

== See also ==
- National Register of Historic Places listings in Fairfield County, Connecticut
