= Acharya Vishva Bandhu =

Indian Vedic scholar and educationist

- Born: 1897; India
- Died: 1973 (aged 75–76)
- Occupations: Vedic scholar Educationist; Writer
- Known for: Vedic studies
- Awards: Padma Bhushan

Acharya Vishva Bandhu was an Indian Vedic scholar, writer, educationist and the principal of Dayanand Brahma Mahavidyalaya, an institution under the management of D. A. V. College Trust and Management Society. He was best known for his contributions in fostering Vishveshvaranand Vishwa Bandhu Institute of Sanskrit and Indological Studies, an Indological institution founded by two sanyasins, Vishveshvaranand and Nityanand, in 1903. He served as the director of the institution and also contributed to the establishment of Lal Chand Research Library of DAV College, Chandigarh. He was the editor of Vedic Texto-Linguistic Studies and A Vedic Word Concordance, two treatises dealing with the textual and linguistic aspects of the Vedas. The Government of India awarded him the third highest civilian honour of the Padma Bhushan, in 1968, for his contributions to Indian education.

== See also ==
- A Vedic Word Concordance
