= Richard A. Florsheim =

American painter

- Born: 1916; Chicago, Illinois, U.S.
- Died: 1979 (aged 62–63); Chicago, Illinois, U.S.
- Education: Latin School of Chicago; University of Chicago
- Occupations: Painter, lithographer, sculptor

Richard A. Florsheim (1916–1979) was an American painter, lithographer, and sculptor. His work is in the permanent collections of the Art Institute of Chicago, the Smithsonian American Art Museum, and the Whitney Museum of American Art.

== Early life and education ==
Richard Florsheim was born to a wealthy Jewish family in Chicago in 1916. His father was industrialist and civic leader Leonard S. Florsheim (of the Florsheim family).

From 1923-1934 Richard was a student at the Chicago Latin School, then from 1934-1935 he studied with Aaron Bohrod a renoun American painter in New York. From 1935-1936 he attended the University of Chicago, and in the late 1930's he exhibited with the Salon des Refusés in Paris.
