= Maurice Bloomfield =

American philologist (1855–1928)

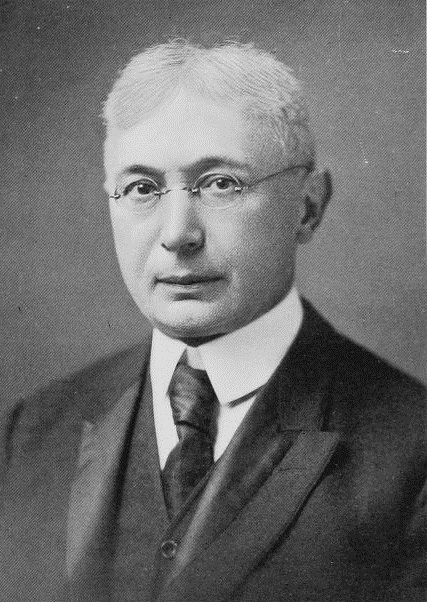
- Born: Maurice Blumenfeld; February 23, 1855; Bielitz, Austrian Empire (now part of Bielsko-Biała, Poland)
- Died: June 12, 1928 (aged 73)
- Spouses: Rosa Zeisler (m. 1885; died 1920) Helen Scott (m. 1921)
- Relatives: Fannie Bloomfield Zeisler (sister); Leonard Bloomfield (nephew)

Academic background
- Education: Johns Hopkins University

Maurice Bloomfield (February 23, 1855 – June 12, 1928) was an Austrian Empire–born American philologist and Sanskrit scholar.

== Biography ==
He was born Maurice Blumenfeld in Bielitz (Polish: Bielsko), in what was then Austrian Silesia (today part of Poland) to Jewish parents. His sister was Fannie Bloomfield Zeisler, and the linguist Leonard Bloomfield was his nephew. He married Rosa Zeisler in 1885 and had a son and a daughter; Rosa died in 1920. In 1921, he married Helen Scott.

He immigrated to the United States in 1867, and graduated from Furman University, Greenville, South Carolina, ten years later. He then studied Sanskrit at Yale, under W. D. Whitney, and at Johns Hopkins University. He was part of the second graduating class to earn a PhD from Johns Hopkins; his degree was conferred in 1879. He returned to Hopkins as associate professor in 1881 after spending two years in Berlin and Leipzig, and soon promoted professor of Sanskrit and comparative philology. He was forced by ill health to retire in 1926 and was named Professor Emeritus in honor of his 45 years on the Hopkins faculty. After retirement, he moved to San Francisco to be closer to his son, and he died there on June 13, 1928. In 1896 Princeton University bestowed the LL.D. degree upon him.

His papers in the American Journal of Philology included several on comparative linguistics, such as those on assimilation and adaptation in congeneric classes of words, as well as many valuable contributions to the interpretation of the Vedas. He was best known as a student of the Vedas. He translated Hymns of the Atharva-Veda (1897) for Max Müller's Sacred Books of the East; contributed the section The Atharva-Veda and the Gopatha Brahmana (1899) to the Buhler-Kielhorn Grundriss der indo-arischen Philologie und Altertumskunde; was the first to edit Kausika-Sutra (1890), and in 1907 published A Vedic Concordance in the Harvard Oriental Series. In 1905 he published Cerberus, the Dog of Hades, a study in comparative mythology. The Religion of the Veda appeared in 1908; Life and Stories of the Jaina Savior Parasvanatha and a work on the Rig Veda were published in 1916.

Bloomfield was elected to the American Philosophical Society in 1904 and the American Academy of Arts and Sciences in 1914.
