= Leonard Bloomfield =

American linguist (1887–1949)

- Born: April 1, 1887; Chicago, Illinois, US
- Died: April 18, 1949 (aged 62); New Haven, Connecticut, US
- Education: Harvard College; University of Wisconsin; University of Chicago; University of Leipzig; University of Göttingen
- Spouse: Alice Sayers
- Scientific career
- Fields: Linguistics, ethnolinguistics
- Workplaces: University of Cincinnati, University of Illinois, Ohio State University, University of Chicago, Yale University
- Thesis: A semasiologic differentiation in Germanic secondary ablaut, (1909)

Leonard Bloomfield (April 1, 1887 – April 18, 1949) was an American linguist who led the development of structural linguistics in the United States during the 1930s and 1940s. He is considered to be the father of American distributionalism. His influential textbook Language, published in 1933, presented a comprehensive description of American structural linguistics. He made significant contributions to Indo-European historical linguistics, the description of Austronesian languages, and description of languages of the Algonquian family.

Bloomfield's approach to linguistics was characterized by its emphasis on the scientific basis of linguistics and emphasis on formal procedures for the analysis of linguistic data. The influence of Bloomfieldian structural linguistics declined in the late 1950s and 1960s as the theory of generative grammar developed by Noam Chomsky came to predominate. However, he influenced Zellig Harris, and Maurice Gross’s Lexicon-Grammar approach carried this intellectual legacy forward.

== Early life and education ==
Bloomfield was born in Chicago, Illinois, on April 1, 1887, to Jewish parents, Carola (née Buber) and Sigmund Bloomfield. His father immigrated to the United States as a child in 1868; the original family name Blumenfeld was changed to Bloomfield after their arrival. In 1896 his family moved to Elkhart Lake, Wisconsin, where he attended elementary school, but returned to Chicago for secondary school. His uncle Maurice Bloomfield was a prominent linguist at Johns Hopkins University, and his aunt Fannie Bloomfield Zeisler was a well-known concert pianist.

Bloomfield attended Harvard College from 1903 to 1906, graduating with the A.B. degree. He subsequently began graduate work at the University of Wisconsin, taking courses in German and Germanic philology, in addition to courses in other Indo-European languages. A meeting with Indo-Europeanist Eduard Prokosch, a faculty member at the University of Wisconsin, convinced Bloomfield to pursue a career in linguistics. In 1908 Bloomfield moved to the University of Chicago, where he took courses in German and Indo-European philology with Frances A. Wood and Carl Darling Buck. His doctoral dissertation in Germanic historical linguistics, A semasiologic differentiation in Germanic secondary ablaut, was supervised by Wood, and he graduated in 1909.

He undertook further studies at the University of Leipzig and the University of Göttingen in 1913 and 1914 with leading Indo-Europeanists August Leskien, Karl Brugmann, as well as Hermann Oldenberg, a specialist in Vedic Sanskrit. Bloomfield also studied at Göttingen with Sanskrit specialist Jacob Wackernagel, and considered both Wackernagel and the Sanskrit grammatical tradition of rigorous grammatical analysis associated with Pāṇini as important influences on both his historical and descriptive work. Further training in Europe was a condition for promotion at the University of Illinois from Instructor to the rank of assistant professor.

== Career ==
Bloomfield was instructor in German at the University of Cincinnati, 1909–1910; Instructor in German at the University of Illinois at Urbana–Champaign, 1910–1913; promoted to assistant professor of Comparative Philology and German, also University of Illinois, 1913–1921; Professor of German and Linguistics at the Ohio State University, 1921–1927; Professor of Germanic Philology at the University of Chicago, 1927–1940; Sterling Professor of Linguistics at Yale University, 1940–1949. During the summer of 1925 Bloomfield worked as Assistant Ethnologist with the Geological Survey of Canada in the Canadian Department of Mines, undertaking linguistic field work on Plains Cree; this position was arranged by Edward Sapir, who was then Chief of the Division of Anthropology, Victoria Museum, Geological Survey of Canada, Canadian Department of Mines. In May 1946, he suffered a debilitating stroke, which ended his career.

Bloomfield was one of the founding members of the Linguistic Society of America. In 1924, along with George M. Bolling (Ohio State University) and Edgar Sturtevant (Yale University) he formed a committee to organize the creation of the Society, and drafted the call for the Society's foundation. He contributed the lead article to the inaugural issue of the Society's journal Language, and was President of the Society in 1935. He taught in the Society's summer Linguistic Institute in 1938–1941, with the 1938–1940 Institutes being held in Ann Arbor, Michigan, and the 1941 Institute in Chapel Hill, North Carolina. Bloomfield was also a member of the American Philosophical Society.

== Indo-European linguistics ==
Bloomfield's earliest work was in historical Germanic studies, beginning with his dissertation, and continuing with a number of papers on Indo-European and Germanic phonology and morphology. His post-doctoral studies in Germany further strengthened his expertise in the Neogrammarian tradition, which still dominated Indo-European historical studies. Bloomfield throughout his career, but particularly during his early career, emphasized the Neogrammarian principle of regular sound change as a foundational concept in historical linguistics.

Bloomfield's work in Indo-European beyond his dissertation was limited to an article on palatal consonants in Sanskrit and one article on the Sanskrit grammatical tradition associated with Pāṇini, in addition to a number of book reviews. Bloomfield made extensive use of Indo-European materials to explain historical and comparative principles in both of his textbooks, An introduction to language (1914), and his seminal Language (1933). In his textbooks he selected Indo-European examples that supported the key Neogrammarian hypothesis of the regularity of sound change, and emphasized a sequence of steps essential to success in comparative work: (a) appropriate data in the form of texts which must be studied intensively and analysed; (b) application of the comparative method; (c) reconstruction of proto-forms. He further emphasized the importance of dialect studies where appropriate, and noted the significance of sociological factors such as prestige, and the impact of meaning. In addition to regular linguistic change, Bloomfield also allowed for borrowing and analogy.

It is argued that Bloomfield's Indo-European work had two broad implications: "He stated clearly the theoretical bases for Indo-European linguistics" and "he established the study of Indo-European languages firmly within general linguistics."

=== Sanskrit studies ===
As part of his training with leading Indo-Europeanists in Germany in 1913 and 1914 Bloomfield studied the Sanskrit grammatical tradition originating with Pāṇini, who lived in northwestern India during the fifth or fourth century BC. Pāṇini's grammar is characterized by its extreme thoroughness and explicitness in accounting for Sanskrit linguistic forms, and by its complex context-sensitive, rule-based generative structure. Bloomfield noted that "Pāṇini gives the formation of every inflected, compounded, or derived word, with an exact statement of the sound-variations (including accent) and of the meaning". In a letter to Algonquianist Truman Michelson, Bloomfield noted "My models are Pāṇini and the kind of work done in Indo-European by my teacher, Professor Wackernagel of Basle."

Pāṇini's systematic approach to analysis includes components for: (a) forming grammatical rules, (b) an inventory of sounds, (c) a list of verbal roots organized into sublists, and (d) a list of classes of morphs. Bloomfield's approach to key linguistic ideas in his textbook Language reflect the influence of Pāṇini in his treatment of basic concepts such as linguistic form, free form, and others. Similarly, Pāṇini is the source for Bloomfield's use of the terms exocentric and endocentric used to describe compound words. Concepts from Pāṇini are found in Eastern Ojibwa, published posthumously in 1958, in particular his use of the concept of a morphological zero, a morpheme that has no overt realization. Pāṇini's influence is also present in Bloomfield's approach to determining parts of speech (Bloomfield uses the term "form-classes") in both Eastern Ojibwa and in the later Menomini language, published posthumously in 1962.

== Austronesian linguistics ==
While at the University of Illinois Bloomfield undertook research on Tagalog, an Austronesian language spoken in the Philippines. He carried out linguistic field work with Alfredo Viola Santiago, who was an engineering student at the university from 1914 to 1917. The results were published as Tagalog texts with grammatical analysis, which includes a series of texts dictated by Santiago in addition to an extensive grammatical description and analysis of every word in the texts. Bloomfield's work on Tagalog, from the beginning of field research to publication, took no more than two years. His study of Tagalog has been described as "the best treatment of any Austronesian language ... The result is a description of Tagalog which has never been surpassed for completeness, accuracy, and wealth of exemplification."

Bloomfield's only other publication on an Austronesian language was an article on the syntax of Ilocano, based upon research undertaken with a native speaker of Ilocano who was a student at Yale University. This article has been described as a "tour de force, for it covers in less than seven pages the entire taxonomic syntax of Ilocano".

== Algonquian linguistics ==
Bloomfield's work on Algonquian languages had both descriptive and comparative components. He published extensively on four Algonquian languages: Fox, Cree, Menominee, and Ojibwe, publishing grammars, lexicons, and text collections. Bloomfield used the materials collected in his descriptive work to undertake comparative studies leading to the reconstruction of Proto-Algonquian, with an early study reconstructing the sound system of Proto-Algonquian, and a subsequent more extensive paper refining his phonological analysis and adding extensive historical information on general features of Algonquian grammar.

Bloomfield undertook field research on Cree, Menominee, and Ojibwe, and analysed the material in previously published Fox text collections. His first Algonquian research, beginning around 1919, involved study of text collections in the Fox language that had been published by William Jones and Truman Michelson. Working through the texts in these collections, Bloomfield excerpted grammatical information to create a grammatical sketch of Fox. A lexicon of Fox based on his excerpted material was published posthumously.

Bloomfield undertook field research on Menominee in the summers of 1920 and 1921, with further brief field research in September 1939 and intermittent visits from Menominee speakers in Chicago in the late 1930s, in addition to correspondence with speakers during the same period. Material collected by Morris Swadesh in 1937 and 1938, often in response to specific queries from Bloomfield, supplemented his information. Significant publications include a collection of texts, a grammar and a lexicon (both published posthumously), in addition to a theoretically significant article on Menomini phonological alternations.

Bloomfield undertook field research in 1925 among Plains Cree speakers in Saskatchewan at the Sweet Grass reserve, and also at the Star Blanket reserve, resulting in two volumes of texts and a posthumous lexicon. He also undertook brief field work on Swampy Cree at The Pas, Manitoba. Bloomfield's work on Swampy Cree provided data to support the predictive power of the hypothesis of exceptionless phonological change.

Bloomfield's initial research on Ojibwe was through study of texts collected by William Jones, in addition to nineteenth century grammars and dictionaries. During the 1938 Linguistic Society of America Linguistic Institute held at the University of Michigan in Ann Arbor, Michigan, he taught a field methods class with Andrew Medler, a speaker of the Ottawa dialect who was born in Saginaw, Michigan, but spent most of his life on Walpole Island, Ontario. The resulting grammatical description, transcribed sentences, texts, and lexicon were published posthumously in a single volume. In 1941 Bloomfield worked with Ottawa dialect speaker Angeline Williams at the 1941 Linguistic Institute held at the University of North Carolina in Chapel Hill, North Carolina, resulting in a posthumously published volume of texts.

== Selected publications ==
- Bloomfield, Leonard. 1909/1910. "A semasiological differentiation in Germanic secondary ablaut". Modern Philology 7:245–288; 345–382.
- Bloomfield, Leonard (1911). "The Indo-European Palatals in Sanskrit". The American Journal of Philology. 32 (1): 36–57. doi:10.2307/288802. hdl:2027/uiuo.ark:/13960/t0mt16d4t. JSTOR 288802.
- Bloomfield, Leonard. 1914. Introduction to the Study of Language. New York: Henry Holt. Reprinted 1983, John Benjamins. Retrieved April 19, 2009. ISBN 90-272-1892-7.
- Bloomfield, Leonard (1914a). "Sentence and Word". Transactions and Proceedings of the American Philological Association. 45: 65–75. doi:10.2307/282688. JSTOR 282688.
- Bloomfield, Leonard (1916). "Subject and Predicate". Transactions and Proceedings of the American Philological Association. 47: 13–22. doi:10.2307/282823. JSTOR 282823.
- Bloomfield, Leonard. 1917. Tagalog texts with grammatical analysis. University of Illinois studies in language and literature, 3.2-4. Urbana, Illinois.
- Bloomfield, Leonard (1925). "Why a linguistic society?". Language. 1 (1): 1–5. JSTOR 409544.
- Bloomfield, Leonard (1925a). "On the sound-system of Central Algonquian". Language. 1 (4): 130–156. doi:10.2307/409540. JSTOR 409540.
- Bloomfield, Leonard. 1925–1927. "Notes on the Fox language." International Journal of American Linguistics 3:219-232; 4: 181–219
- Bloomfield, Leonard (1926). "A set of postulates for the science of language" (PDF). Language. 2 (3): 153–164. doi:10.2307/408741. hdl:11858/00-001M-0000-002A-5F51-4. JSTOR 408741. Archived (PDF) from the original on 2017-09-22. (reprinted in: Martin Joos, ed., Readings in Linguistics I, Chicago and London: The University of Chicago Press 1957, 26–31).
- Bloomfield, Leonard (1927). "On Some Rules of Pāṇini". Journal of the American Oriental Society. 47: 61–70. doi:10.2307/593241. JSTOR 593241.
- Bloomfield, Leonard (1927a). "Literate and illiterate speech". American Speech. 2 (10): 432–441. doi:10.2307/451863. JSTOR 451863. S2CID 147012813.
- Bloomfield, Leonard. 1928. Menomini texts. Publications of the American Ethnological Society 12. New York: G. E. Stechert, Agents. [reprinted 1974. New York: AMS Press] ISBN 0-404-58162-5
- Bloomfield, Leonard (1928a). "A note on sound change". Language. 4 (2): 99–100. doi:10.2307/408791. JSTOR 408791.
- Bloomfield, Leondard. 1929. Review of Bruno Liebich, 1928, Konkordanz Pāṇini-Candra, Breslau: M. & H. Marcus. Language 5:267–276. Reprinted in Hockett, Charles. 1970, pp. 219–226.
- Bloomfield, Leonard. 1930. Sacred stories of the Sweet Grass Cree. National Museum of Canada Bulletin, 60 (Anthropological Series 11). Ottawa. [reprinted 1993, Saskatoon, SK: Fifth House]. ISBN 1-895618-27-4
- Bloomfield, Leonard. 1933. Language. New York: Henry Holt. ISBN 0-226-06067-5, ISBN 90-272-1892-7
- Bloomfield, Leonard. 1934. Plains Cree texts. American Ethnological Society Publications 16. New York. [reprinted 1974, New York: AMS Press]
- Bloomfield, Leonard. 1935. "Linguistic aspects of science". Philosophy of Science 2/4:499–517.
- Bloomfield, Leonard. 1939. "Menomini morphophonemics". Etudes phonologiques dédiées à la mémoire de M. le prince N.S. Trubetzkoy, 105–115. Travaux du Cercle Linguistique de Prague 8. Prague.
- Bloomfield, Leonard. 1939a. Linguistic aspects of science. Chicago: University of Chicago Press. ISBN 0-226-57579-9
- Bloomfield, Leonard (1942). "Outline of Ilocano syntax". Language. 18 (3): 193–200. doi:10.2307/409552. JSTOR 409552.
- Bloomfield, Leonard. 1942a. Outline guide for the practical study of foreign languages. Baltimore: Linguistic Society of America.
- Bloomfield, Leonard. 1946. "Algonquian." Harry Hoijer et al., eds., Linguistic structures of native America, pp. 85–129. Viking Fund Publications in Anthropology 6. New York: Wenner-Gren Foundation.
- Bloomfield, Leonard. 1958. Eastern Ojibwa. Ed. Charles F. Hockett. Ann Arbor: University of Michigan Press.
- Bloomfield, Leonard. 1962. The Menomini language. Ed. Charles F. Hockett. New Haven: Yale University Press.
- Bloomfield, Leonard. 1975. Menomini lexicon. Ed. Charles F. Hockett. Milwaukee Public Museum Publications in Anthropology and History. Milwaukee: Milwaukee Public Museum.
- Bloomfield, Leonard. 1984. Cree-English lexicon. Ed. Charles F. Hockett. New Haven: Human Relations Area Files. ISBN 99954-923-9-3
- Bloomfield, Leonard. 1984b. Fox-English lexicon. Ed. Charles F. Hockett. New Haven: Human Relations Area Files. ISBN 99954-923-7-7
