= Fannie Bloomfield Zeisler =

Austrian-American pianist (1863–1927)

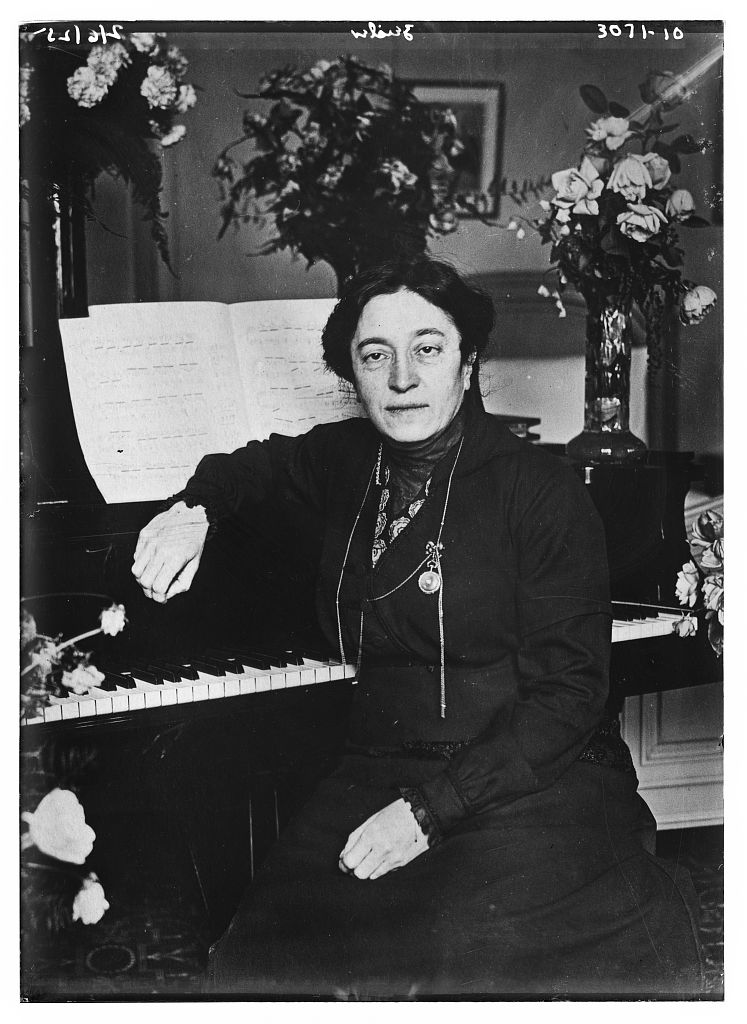
- Zeisler c. 1910–1915

Background information
- Also known as: Fannie Bloomfield
- Born: Fannie Blumenfeld; July 16, 1863; Bielitz, Austrian Silesia, Austrian Empire
- Died: August 20, 1927 (aged 64) Chicago, Illinois, US
- Genre: classical
- Instrument: Piano
- Years active: 1875–1925

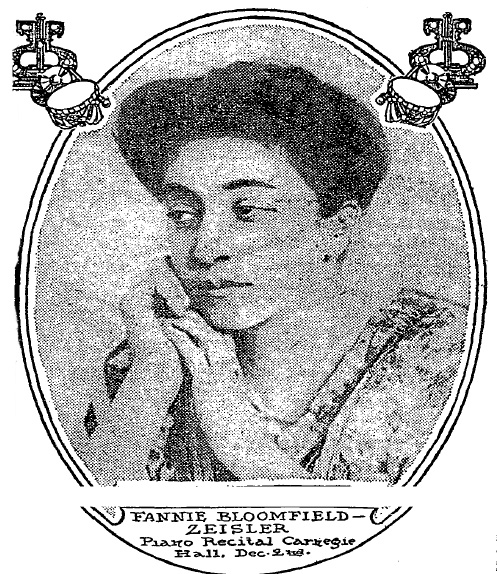
Portrait from The New York Times, November 26, 1911

Fannie Bloomfield Zeisler (July 16, 1863 – August 20, 1927) was an Austrian-born American pianist.

== Biography ==
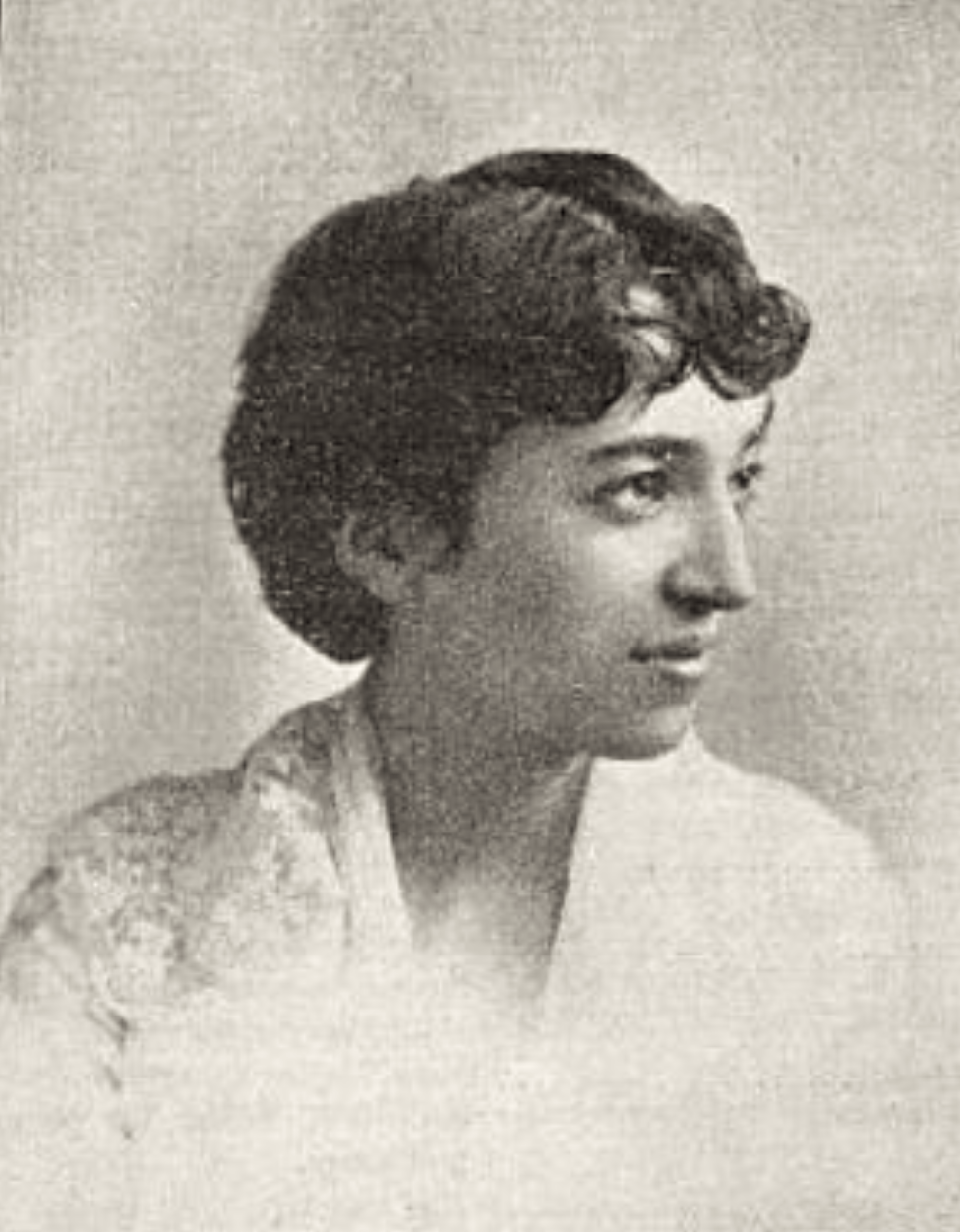
Fannie Bloomfield Zeisler in 1890.

Zeisler was born Fannie Blumenfeld on July 16, 1863, in Bielitz, Austrian Silesia, to Jewish parents. She emigrated to the United States with her family at the age of 4 in 1867. The family settled in Chicago, Illinois, where they later changed their name to Bloomfield. She was the sister of Maurice Bloomfield and the aunt of Leonard Bloomfield.

At the age of six, before receiving any musical instruction, she began picking out tunes on the piano. Her first teachers were in Chicago; Bernard Ziehn and Carl Wolfsohn. In 1877, Annette Essipova, then on tour in the United States, heard her play and advised that she became a pupil of Theodor Leschetizky. She made her debut at the age of 11 in February 1875. In 1878, she returned to Austria to study in Vienna, under Leschetizky. While in Austria, she changed her name from Blumenfeld to Bloomfield. She returned to Chicago in 1883.

Bloomfield performed in concert in Chicago in April 1884. In January 1885, she debuted in New York City. Around the turn of the century, she made piano rolls of various piano compositions, Chopin's Waltz No. 11 in G minor being among them. In 1888, she was honorably initiated into musical women's fraternity Alpha Chi Omega.

== Personal life ==
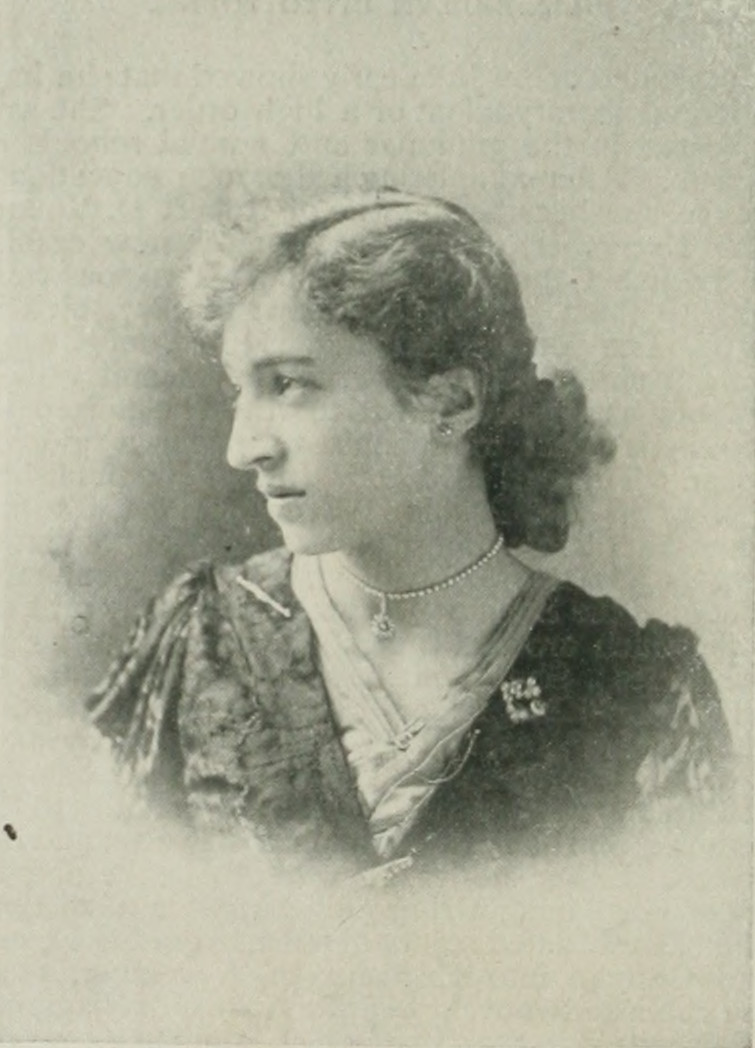
ca. 1893

Bloomfeld married the attorney Sigmund Zeisler in 1885 and had three sons: Leonard Bloomfield Zeisler, Paul Bloomfield Zeisler, and Ernest Bloomfield Zeisler (married to Claire Zeisler). In 1888, she returned to Vienna to study with Leschetizky. She also began to tour in Europe and the United States, with the Chicago Symphony Orchestra. Her last performance was in February 1925 in Chicago. She played the Beethoven Andante Favori and concertos by Chopin and Schumann.

Zeisler died in Chicago, Illinois on August 20, 1927.

== Discography and interviews ==
- Caswell Collection, Vol. 3: Fannie Bloomfield Zeisler ASIN: B00005B7H6
- The Genesis Recordings of Legendary Pianists, Vol. 1 ASIN: B00000J89K
- Great pianists on piano playing from James Francis Cooke, (published in 1917 republished by Dover 1999)
