= Milton S. Florsheim =

American shoe magnate (1868–1936)

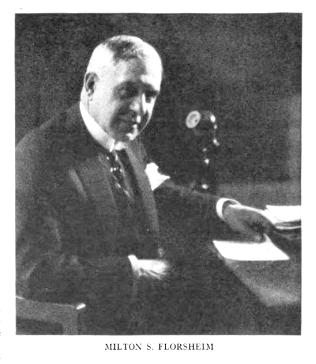
- Shown circa 1924
- Born: July 27, 1868; Montreal, Quebec, Canada
- Died: December 22, 1936 (aged 68); Los Angeles, California, US
- Burial place: Rosehill Cemetery
- Known for: Founder of Florsheim Shoes
- Spouse: Gertrude Stern
- Children: Irving S. Florsheim; Harold Milton Florsheim
- Parent(s): Henriette Nusbaum Florsheim; Sigmund Florsheim
- Family: Lillian Florsheim (daughter-in-law); Claire Zeisler (daughter-in-law); Mary Jones Bradley (granddaughter)

Milton S. Florsheim (July 27, 1868 – December 22, 1936), was the chairman of the board and founder of Florsheim Shoes.

== Biography ==
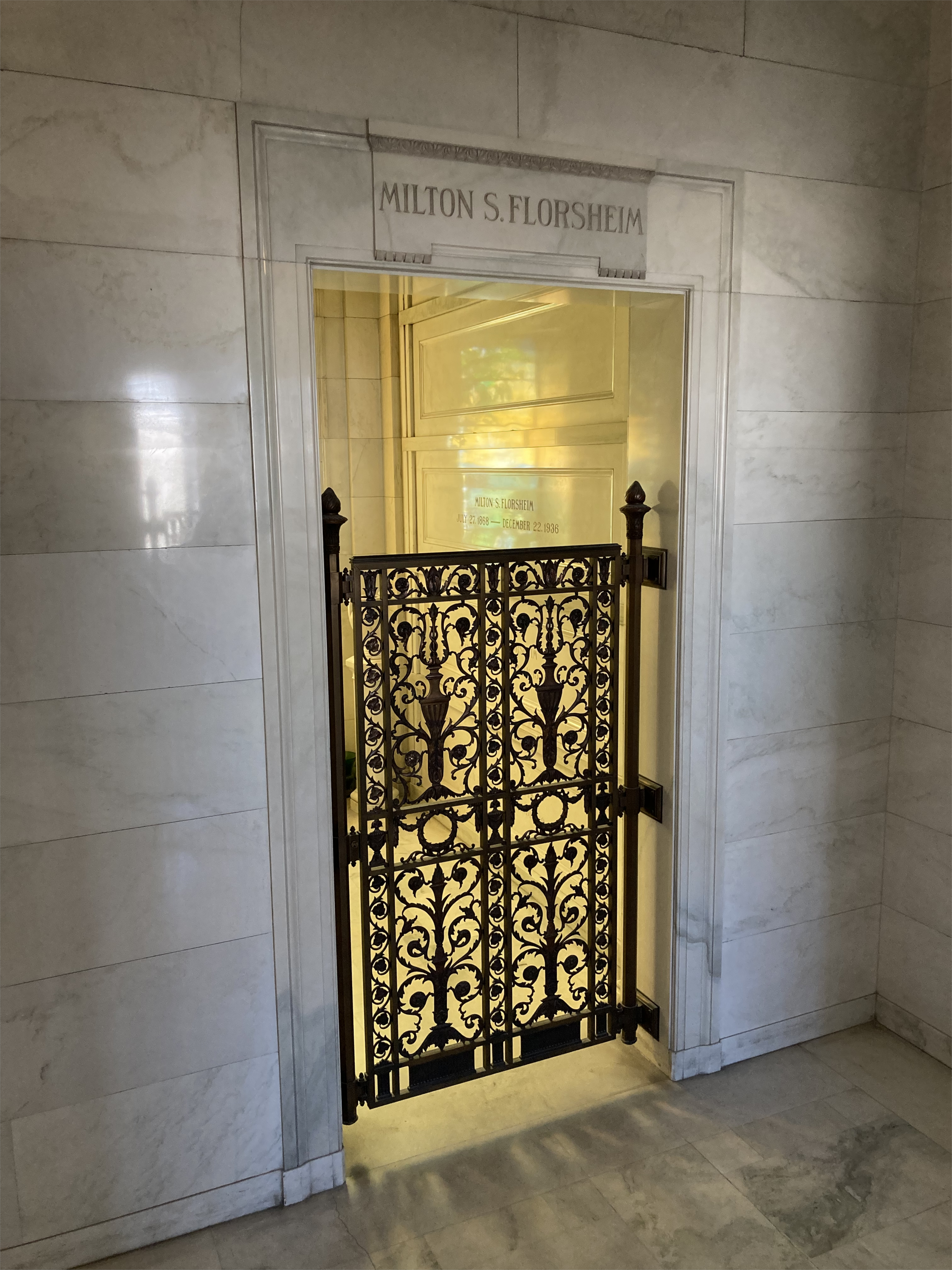
Florsheim's grave at Rosehill Mausoleum

Florsheim was born to a Jewish family in Montreal, Canada on July 27, 1868, the son of Henriette (née Nusbaum) and Sigmund Florsheim. Shortly before he started grade school, the Florsheim family relocated to the Chicago area. He attended Chicago public schools. He worked in his father's shoe store before founding Florsheim Shoes in 1892. Florsheim was connected with the American Jewish Committee and the Jewish Charities of Chicago and was a trustee of Northwestern University.

In 1894, he married Gertrude Stern; they had two sons, Irving S. and Harold Milton (1900-1987). Harold was married to artist Claire Florsheim Zeisler. Their daughter Nancy married architect Bertrand Goldberg. Irving married sculptor Lillian Florsheim. Their daughter, Mary, was married to actor and singer Allan Jones.

Florsheim died on December 22, 1936, in Los Angeles, California, aged 68. He was interred at Rosehill Mausoleum in Rosehill Cemetery, Chicago.
