= Allan Jones (actor) =

American actor and tenor (1907–1992)

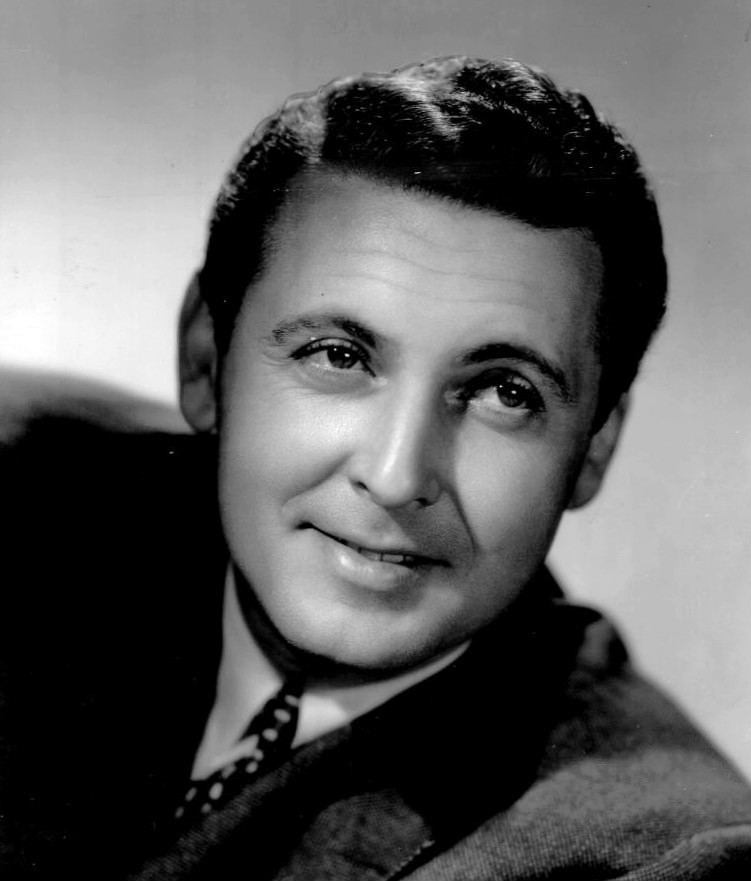
- Jones in 1945.
- Born: Theodore Allen Jones; October 14, 1907; Old Forge, Pennsylvania, U.S.
- Died: June 27, 1992 (aged 84); New York City, New York, U.S.
- Occupations: Singer, actor
- Years active: 1928–1987
- Spouses: Irene Hervey (m. 1936; div. 1957) Mary Florsheim Picking (m. 1958; div. 1964) Esther Marie Villavincie (m. 1967)
- Children: 2, including Jack Jones

Allan Jones (October 14, 1907 – June 27, 1992) was an American tenor and actor.

Jones is probably best remembered today as the male romantic lead actor in the first two films the Marx Brothers starred in for Metro-Goldwyn-Mayer, A Night at the Opera (1935) and A Day at the Races (1937), as well as the film musicals Show Boat (1936) and The Firefly (1937), where he introduced "The Donkey Serenade", which became his signature song.

== Early years ==
Jones was born in Old Forge, Pennsylvania, and raised in nearby Scranton, where he graduated from Central High School. His father and grandfather were Welsh coal miners, and he worked in coal mines early in his adult life. He left that occupation to study voice at New York University.

In an interview in 1973, Jones recalled that his father and grandfather were musically talented: "My father had a beautiful tenor voice. So did my grandfather...Grandfather taught violin, voice, and piano when he could. My father sang every chance he could get and realized his ambition through me."

== Stage ==
Jones appeared on Broadway a few times, including 1933's Roberta and the short-lived 1934 revival of Bitter Sweet after debuting in Boccacio in 1931.

== Film ==
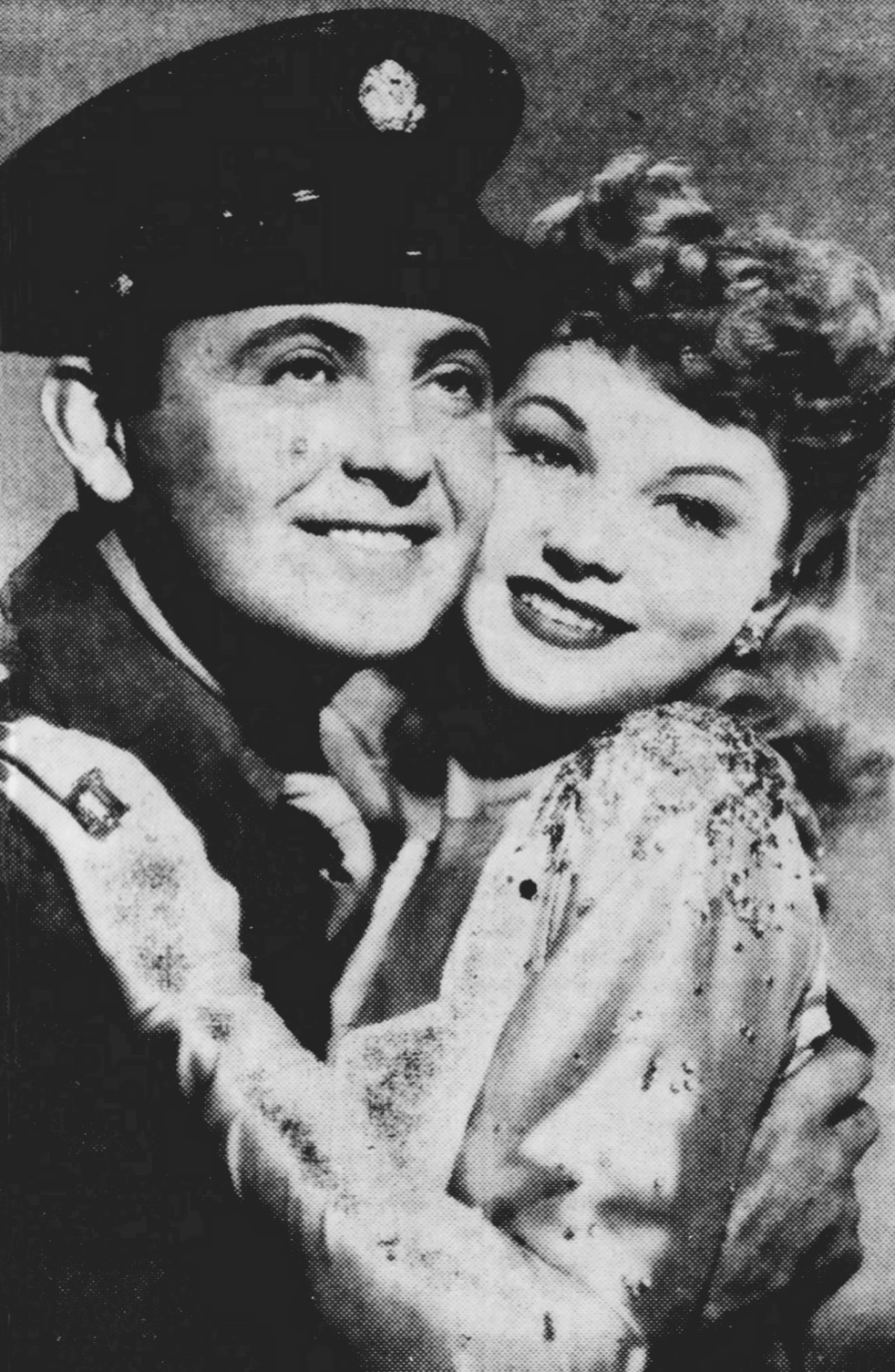
Allan Jones and Jane Frazee in When Johnny Comes Marching Home, 1943

Jones starred in many film musicals during the 1930s and 1940s. The best-known of these were Show Boat (1936) and The Firefly (1937), where he first performed what became his signature song: "The Donkey Serenade". Jones is probably best remembered today as the romantic lead opposite Kitty Carlisle and Maureen O'Sullivan respectively, in the first two MGM films of the Marx Brothers, A Night at the Opera (1935) and A Day at the Races (1937), filling the straight-man role opened by the departure of Zeppo Marx from the team.

Jones made a brief appearance in the 1936 Nelson Eddy–Jeanette MacDonald film Rose Marie, singing music from Charles Gounod's Romeo et Juliette and Giacomo Puccini's Tosca. According to Merchant of Dreams, Charles Higham's biography of Louis B. Mayer, Eddy, who apparently considered Jones a rival and a potential threat, asked that most of the footage of Jones in Rose Marie be cut, including his rendition of the tenor aria E lucevan le stelle from Tosca and MGM agreed to Eddy's demands. In his final film for MGM, Everybody Sing (1938) with Judy Garland and Fanny Brice, Jones introduced the pop standard "The One I Love". "My Love For Yours" 1939.

In 1940, Jones starred in two musicals for Universal Pictures: The Boys from Syracuse, with the stage score by Rodgers and Hart, and One Night in the Tropics with a score by Jerome Kern and Dorothy Fields, which was also the screen debut of Abbott and Costello. After these two films, Jones slipped to leads in several "B" musicals, at Paramount and Universal, including a reunion with his A Night at the Opera co-star Kitty Carlisle in Larceny with Music (1943). The same year, he made a guest appearance, as himself, in the Olsen and Johnson musical Crazy House, where he again performed "The Donkey Serenade".

== Recordings ==
Jones recorded prodigiously throughout his career, primarily for RCA Victor. In 1977, his 1938 recording of "The Donkey Serenade" ranked third among the all-time best-selling single records issued by RCA Victor.

== Radio ==
In the mid-1940s, Jones and pianist Frankie Carle starred in the Old Gold Show on CBS radio.

== Later years ==
In 1979, Jones appeared in a summer performance of Man of La Mancha at the Elitch Theatre in Denver, Colorado.

In December 1980, Jones made his final screen appearance on an episode of the ABC-TV series, The Love Boat, which also featured his son Jack Jones and Dorothy Lamour. During the 1980s, Jones appeared in several stage productions of Man of La Mancha, Paint Your Wagon, Guys and Dolls, and Carousel. Jones continued to make concert appearances until a few months before his death in 1992.

Jones also bred and raised racehorses on his ranch in California.

== Personal life ==
Jones was married four times. He was married to actress Irene Hervey from 1936 to 1957; their son was pop singer Jack Jones. His other wives included Marjorie Annette Bull, Esther Marie Villavincie, and Mary Florsheim (granddaughter of Milton S. Florsheim).

== Death ==
Jones died of lung cancer at Lenox Hill Hospital in New York City on June 27, 1992, aged 84.

== Filmography ==
Year	Title	Role	Notes
1935	Reckless	Allan	Film debut
1935	A Night at the Opera	Riccardo Barone	with the Marx Brothers
1936	Rose Marie	Romeo	with Jeanette Macdonald
1936	Show Boat	Gaylord Ravenal	with Irene Dunne
1937	A Day at the Races	Gil Stewart	with the Marx Brothers
1937	The Firefly	Don Diego	with Jeanette Macdonald
1938	Everybody Sing	Ricky Saboni	with Judy Garland and Fanny Brice
1939	Honeymoon in Bali	Eric Sinclair	
1939	The Great Victor Herbert	John Ramsey	with Mary Martin
1940	The Boys from Syracuse	Antipholus of Ephesus / Antipholus of Syracuse	
1940	One Night in the Tropics	Jim Moore	film debut of Abbott and Costello
1941	The Hard-Boiled Canary	Michael Maddy	
1942	True to the Army	Pvt. Stephen Chandler	
1942	Moonlight in Havana	Johnny Norton	
1942	When Johnny Comes Marching Home	Johnny Kovacs - aka Johnny O'Rourke	
1943	Rhythm of the Islands	Tommy	
1943	Larceny with Music	Ken Daniels	
1943	Crazy House	Himself	
1943	You're a Lucky Fellow, Mr. Smith	Tony Smith	
1944	Sing a Jingle	Ray King	
1945	Honeymoon Ahead	Orpheus	
1945	Senorita from the West	Phil Bradley	
1964	Stage to Thunder Rock	Mayor Ted Dollar	
1965	A Swingin' Summer	Mr. Johnson	
