= Florsheim Shoes =

American shoe brand

Florsheim, Inc.
- Type: Shoe brand
- Founded: 1892; 134 years ago
- Founder: Milton S. Florsheim
- Headquarters: Glendale, Wisconsin, United States
- Parent: Weyco Group
- Website: Florsheim Shoes

Florsheim Shoes is an American shoe brand founded in Chicago in 1892. It is a subsidiary of Weyco Group, which is owned by members of the founding Florsheim family.

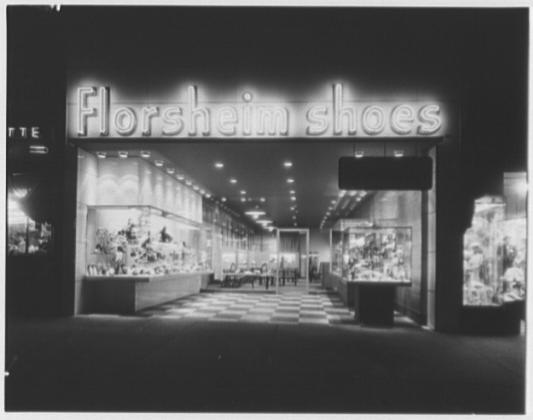
Florsheim shoe store in The Bronx in 1952

== History ==
Florsheim & Co. was founded in Chicago in 1892 by the German immigrant Sigmund Florsheim and his son Milton S. Florsheim.

The company marked its shoes with its own name and assisted stores in promoting them. By 1930, Florsheim was making women's shoes and had five Chicago factories and 2,500 employees, with 71 stores partly or entirely company-owned and 9,000 stores around the US selling Florsheims.

Milton Florsheim died in 1936 and was succeeded by his son Irving. In 1946, his younger son Harold became president with Irving Florsheim becoming chairman.

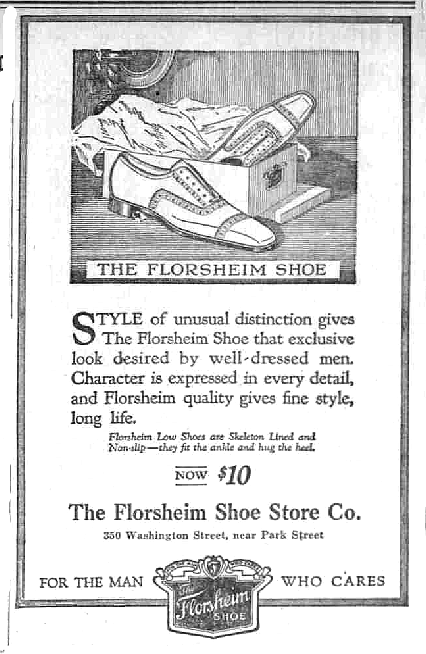
1922 newspaper ad for Florsheim shoes

In 1953, International Shoe Company, the world's largest shoe maker, bought Florsheim for $21 million. Three years later, Florsheim became a division, continuing to operate as a separate entity. During its first ten years, Florsheim was International Shoe's most important unit, doubling its sales and accounting for a quarter of the parent company's sales, as well as more than double that fraction of earnings. Florsheim had 70% of high-quality men's shoes and succeeded when its parent company was struggling. Irving Florsheim died in 1959, and under International Shoe Company ownership, Thomas W. Florsheim, son of Harold, left the company in 1964, investing $750,000 in rival Weyenberg Shoe Manufacturing Company (Weyco Group) of Glendale, Wisconsin, partnering with Frank Weyenberg in a deal where the Florsheim family would be involved with its rival. In 1976, Thomas W. Florsheim, Sr. took over Weyco after Frank Weyenberg's death.

Florsheim eventually sold women's shoes through Thayer-McNeil stores, also owned by International Shoe (by this time called Interco).

In the 1980s Florsheim began selling athletic shoes, and Interco's shoe division became part of Florsheim.

In 1991, Interco declared bankruptcy but kept Florsheim until the company exited the shoe business in 1994. Florsheim became a separate company. In 1996 it changed its name to Florsheim Shoe Group.

Until the mid-1990s, Florsheim had stores in many US malls. With the rise of such shoe stores as Journeys and Finish Line, Inc., and the de-emphasis of shoe stores in American malls, most Florsheim stores closed by the early 2000s. This followed the fate of other companies such as Kinney Shoes, Thom McAn and Butler Shoes. Butler Shoes became Butler Group owned by Zale Corporation. Butler Group closed in 1990.

In 2002, Florsheim filed for Chapter 11 bankruptcy and announced the closure of 131 underperforming stores. Thomas W. Florsheim returned the company to its family ownership when Weyco, then controlled by his sons Thomas W. Florsheim, Jr. and John W. Florsheim, acquired Florsheim Shoe assets for $47 million.

In 2009, Florsheim Shoes collaborated with Duckie Brown to create a line of men's shoes.

== Fans of the brand ==
Michael Jackson wore Florsheim shoes for dancing. He wore its models Como, Como Imperial, and Berkley, with leather heels installed. Florsheim loafers worn and signed by Jackson have sold for as much as $14,000 at auction.

During his second presidency, Donald Trump has shown enthusiasm for the shoes, reportedly guessing his cabinet members' shoe sizes and ordering them their own pairs. He personally has been seen sporting the black Oxfords.

== Gallery ==
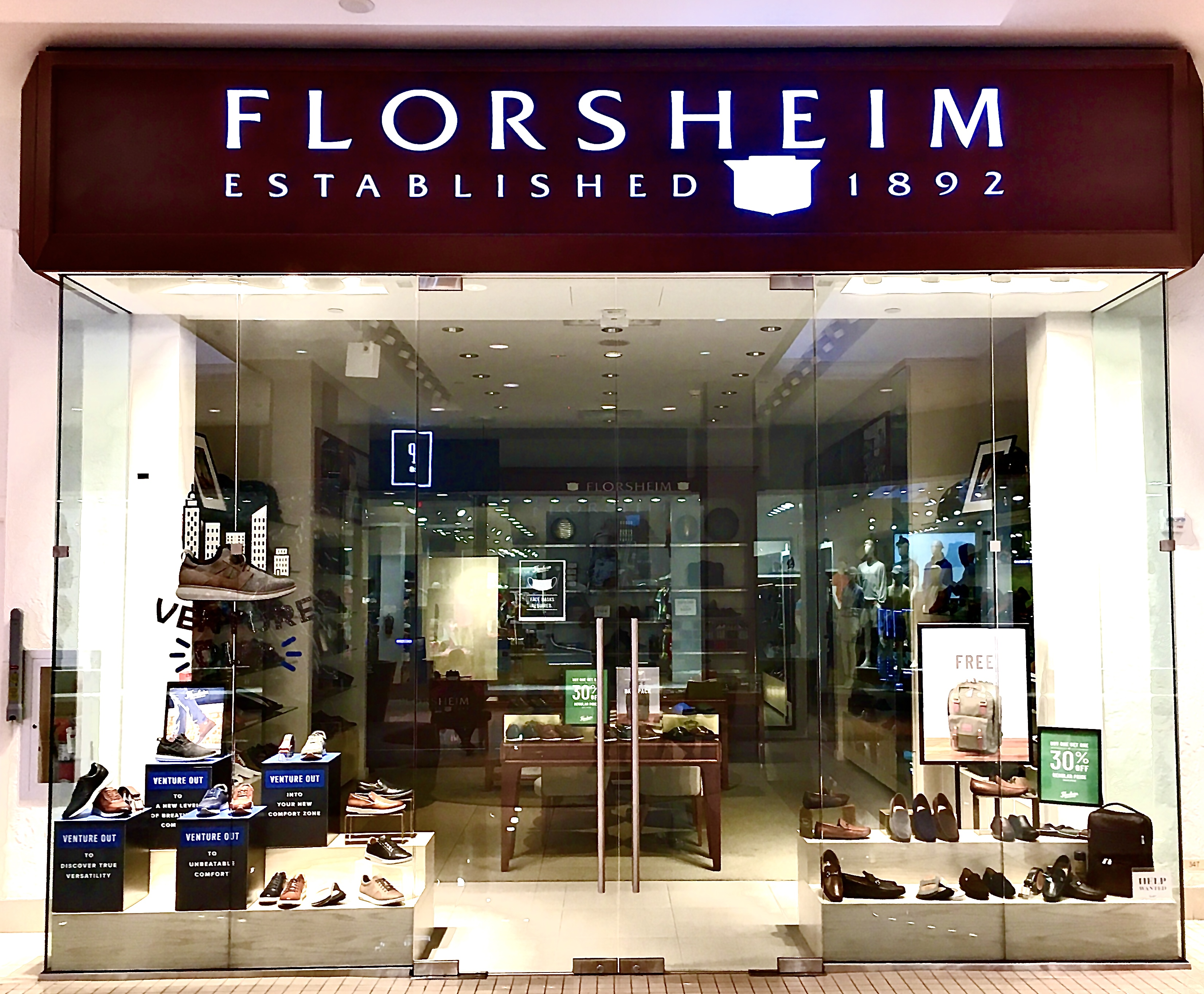
Store in Aventura, Florida, 2021

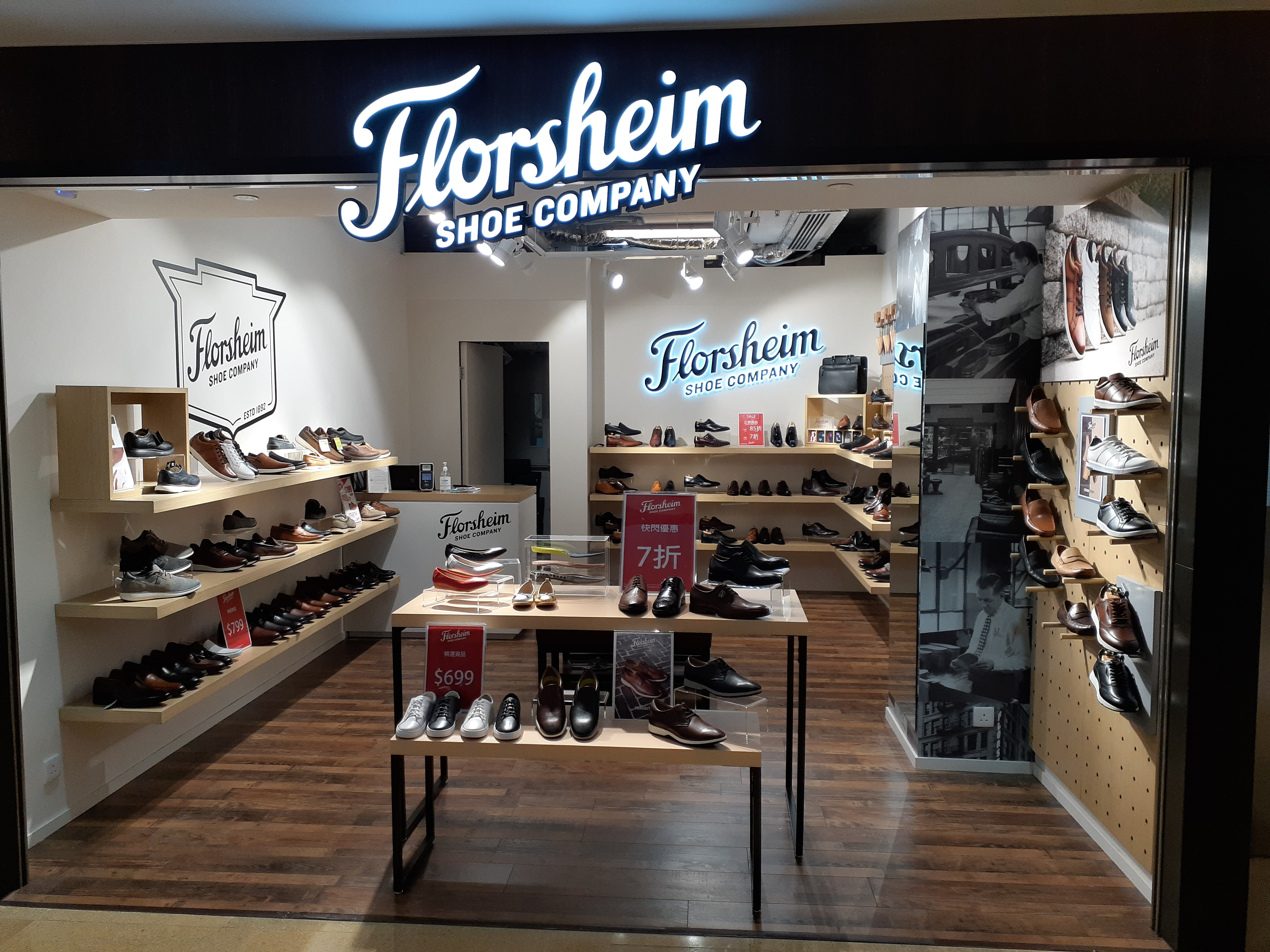
Store in Cityplaza mall in Hong Kong, 2021

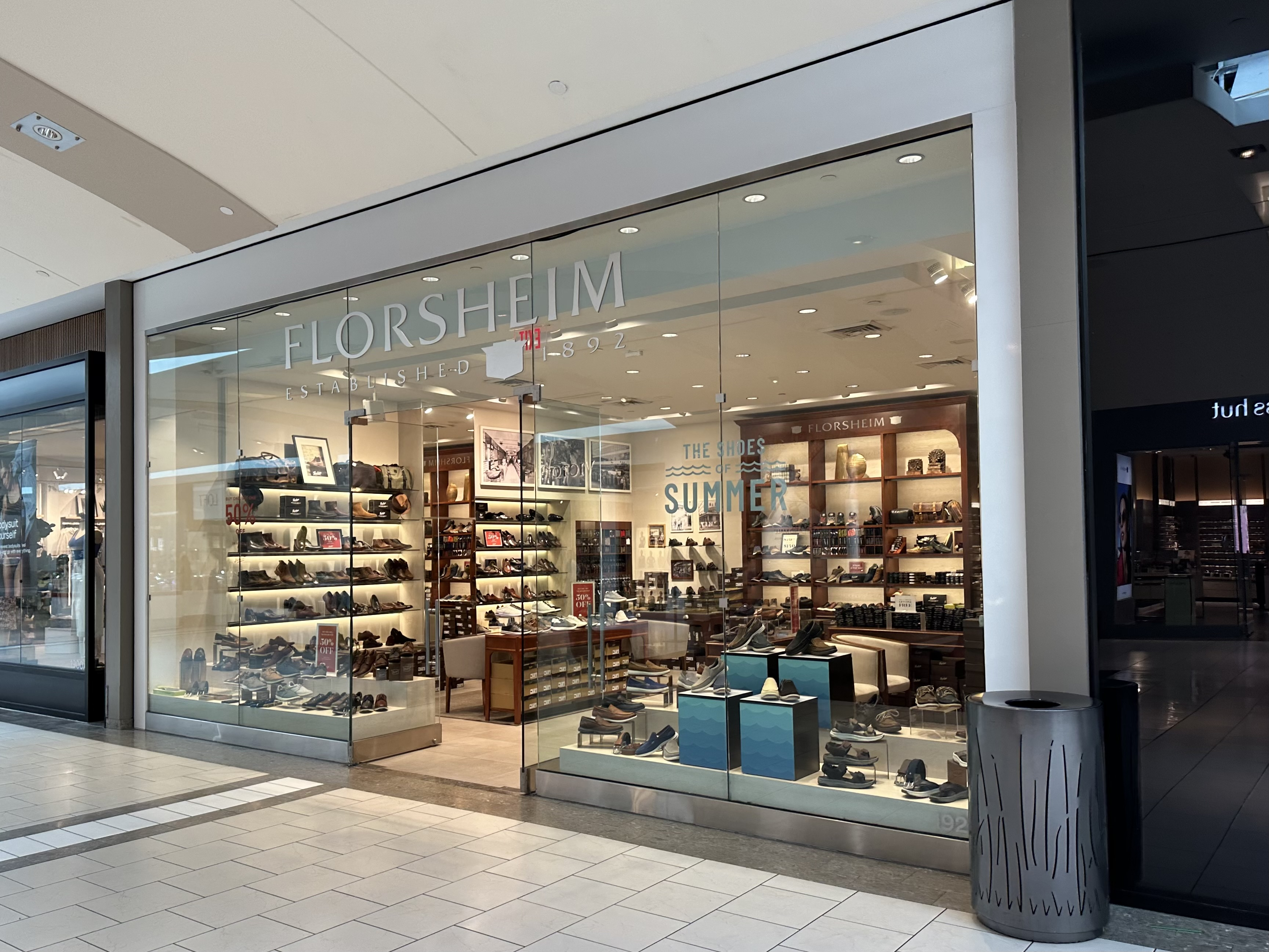
Store in Dadeland Mall in Kendall, Florida, 2023

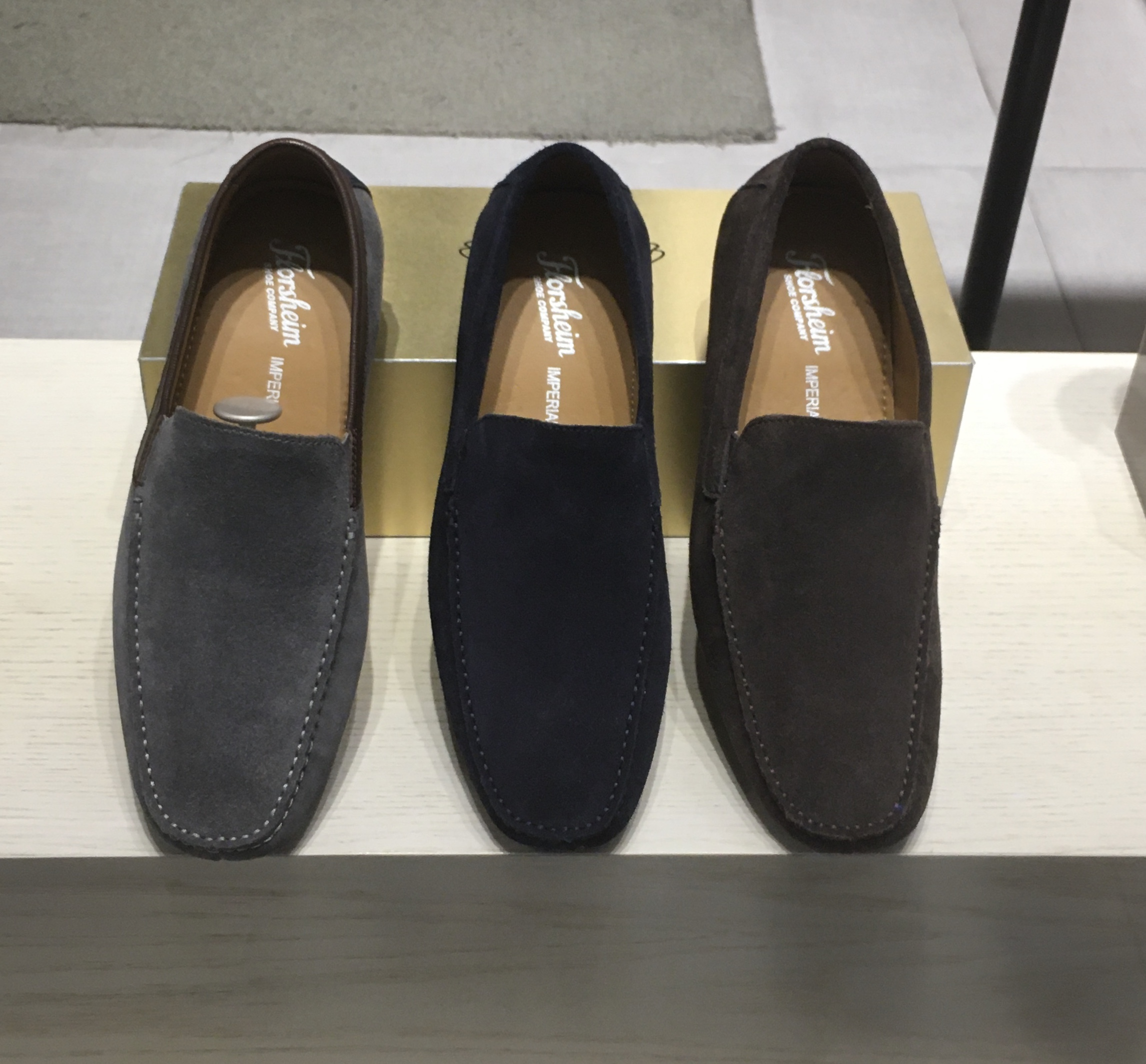
Loafers from Florsheim Shoes, 2021

== See also ==
- Florsheim Shoe Company Building in Chicago
