= Jeanette MacDonald discography =

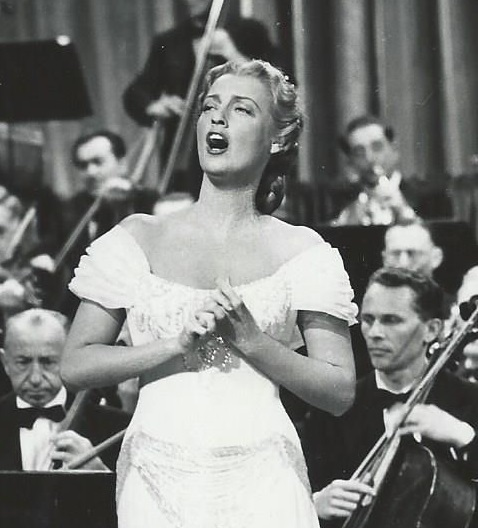
- MacDonald performing with an orchestra in the movie The Sun Comes Up (1949)
- Studio albums: 8
- Compilation albums: 7 (official)
- Tribute albums: 2
- Singles: 11 (21 songs) (Note: "Ah! Sweet Mystery of Life" was released twice on two different singles: one was a solo, and the other was a duet.)
- B-sides: 10
- Songs: 50+

American actress/singer Jeanette MacDonald (1903 – 1965) recorded over 50 songs during her film career for RCA Victor and its foreign counterparts. Due to the limited statistics released to the public, it is not certain how many songs and singles she has released or their exact popularity in music charts, although she has officially recorded eight studio albums (five LPs) and released seven compilation albums. Despite soundtracks for musical films not becoming a concept until the 1940s, many of her singles were re-recordings of songs she had performed in the movies (a common practice other musical actors did at the time); her first "album" was the single "Dream Lover"/"March of the Grenadiers" (1930) on 78 rpm discs for The Love Parade. She also recorded a cover album of songs featured in Sigmund Romberg's Up in Central Park in 1945 with Robert Merrill, as well as non-English records during her 1931 European tour.

MacDonald performed in musicals alongside Maurice Chevalier, Allan Jones, and Nelson Eddy, although her films with Eddy are the most well-known today. The single "Ah! Sweet Mystery of Life"/"Indian Love Call" from Rose Marie (1936) received a gold record from RCA Red Seal. Her other popular (and/or well-remembered) singles were "Beyond the Blue Horizon", "San Francisco", and "Ave Maria". "Beyond the Blue Horizon" peaked at #9 in the charts and became MacDonald's signature song; she performed it professionally three times in her career.

MacDonald's first studio album was MacDonald in Song (1939), followed by Religious Songs (1945) and Operetta Favorites (1946). Her first LP was Romantic Moments (1950), followed by Favorites, Favorites in Hi-Fi (1959), Smilin' Through (1960) and Jeanette MacDonald Sings Songs of Faith and Inspiration (1963). Seven official compilation albums were released, such as Jeanette MacDonald 1929–1939 and A Tribute to Jeanette MacDonald volumes 1 and 2, but due to the varying copyrights on audio worldwide, unofficial albums in MacDonald's name have been released on CDs in European countries under public domain.

== Albums ==
=== Studio albums ===
| Title | Year | Album details | Notes | R. |
|---|---|---|---|---|
| MacDonald in Song | c. 1939 | No. of tracks: 10; Label: RCA Red Seal; Conductor: Giuseppe Bamboschek; Serial number: M 642; Formats: 78 rpm | Also included a few songs with Bamboschek as piano accompaniment | |
| Religious Songs | 1945 | No. of tracks: 6; Label: RCA Victor, Radio Corporation of America; Conductor: Maximilian Pilzer; Serial number: RCA LM-62; Formats: 78 rpm | Also known as Jeanette MacDonald With Orchestra and Chorus Religious Songs | |
| Up in Central Park | 1945 | No. of tracks: 6; Label: RCA Camden; Conductor: Robert Russell Bennett; Serial number: RCA M-991; Formats: 78 rpm | A tribute album with Robert Merrill | |
| Operetta Favourites | 1946 | No. of tracks: 6; Label: RCA Red Seal; Conductor: Russ Case; Serial number: M-1071; Formats: 78 rpm | Re-released in 1950 | |
| Romantic Moments | 1950 | No. of tracks: 6; Label: RCA Victor Red Seal; Conductor: Robert Russell Bennett; Serial number: RCA LM-62, WDM-1489; Formats: LP | — | |
| Favorites | —N/a (Note: The date of this album's release is unknown, however, the songs featured were recorded in August 1950 and was most likely released either at the end of the year or in early 1951.) | No. of tracks: 6; Label: RCA Victor; Conductor: Robert Russell Bennett; Serial number: RCA LM-73; Formats: 10", LP | — | |
| Favorites in Hi-Fi | 1959 | No. of tracks: 12; Label: RCA Victor; Conductor: Lehman Engel; Serial number: RCA LPM-1738; Formats: LP | Receives RIAA gold record; Collaboration with Nelson Eddy; Also known as: Favorites in Stereo; Jeanette MacDonald and Nelson Eddy: Favorites in Hi-Fi | |
| Smilin' Through | 1960 | No. of tracks: 12; Label: RCA Camden; Serial number: CAL-325; Formats: LP | Released in the UK in 1969; Re-released in the USA in 1986 | |
| Jeanette MacDonald Sings Songs of Faith and Inspiration | 1963 | No. of tracks: 12; Label: RCA Camden; Serial number: CAL-750; Formats: LP | — | |

=== Compilation albums ===
| Title | Year | Album details | Notes | Ref |
|---|---|---|---|---|
| Operetta Favorites by Jeanette MacDonald and Nelson Eddy | 1952 | No. of tracks: 8; Label: RCA Victor; Serial number: LCT-16; Formats: LP | — | |
| Jeanette MacDonald and Nelson Eddy (Vintage Series) | 1966 | No. of tracks: 16; Label: RCA Victor; Serial number: RCA LPV-526; Formats: Vinyl, LP | From RCA Victor's Vintage Series | |
| Jeanette MacDonald Sings San Francisco And Other Silver Screen Favorites | 1970 | No. of tracks: 12; Label: RCA Victrola; Serial number: VIC-1515; Formats: LP | Not to be confused with San Francisco and Other Jeanette MacDonald Favorites | |
| Singing Sweetheart | 1979 | Label: J&B; Serial number: JB036; Formats: LP | Peaked at number 51 in Australia. | |
| A Tribute to Jeanette MacDonald, vol. 1 | ? | No. of tracks: Label: OASI Recordings; Serial number: OASI 7007; Formats: Vinyl, LP, CD | — | |
| A Tribute to Jeanette MacDonald, vol. 2 | ? | No. of tracks: Label: OASI Records; Serial number: OASI 7011; Formats: Vinyl, LP, CD | — | |
| San Francisco and Other Jeanette MacDonald Favorites | 1991 | No. of tracks: 22; Label: RCA Victor Gold Seal; Serial number: RCA 09026-60877-2; Formats: CD | — | |
| Jeanette MacDonald 1929–1939 | c. 1994 | No. of tracks: 23; Label: Chansophone; Serial number: Chansophone 141; Formats: CD | Also known as Jeanette MacDonald: Succes Et Raretes, 1929–1939 | |

== Songs ==
=== Singles ===
| Year | Title | Credits | Notes | Ref. |
|---|---|---|---|---|
| 1930 | "Dream Lover"/"March of the Grenadiers" | Director: Nathaniel Shilkret; Composer: Victor Schertzinger; Lyrics by: Clifford Grey | From the movie The Love Parade | |
| 1930 | "Always, In All Ways"/"Beyond the Blue Horizon" | Director: LeRoy Shield; Composer: W. Franke Harling, Richard A. Whiting; Lyrics by: Leo Robin | Over 12,000 copies sold; Reissued in 1944; From the movie Monte Carlo | |
| 1932 | "One Hour with You"/"We Will Always Be Sweethearts" | Director: Nathaniel Finston; Composer: Richard A. Whiting; Lyrics by: Leo Robin | Sold over 3000 copies; From One Hour with You | |
| 1932 | "Une heure près de toi"/"Coeur contre coeur" | Director: Nathaniel Finston; Composer: Richard A. Whiting; Lyrics by: André Hornez (translated from Leo Robin) | In French; Sold 64 copies; From Une heure près de toi (French version of One Hour with You) | |
| 1932 | "Love Me Tonight"/"Isn't It Romantic?" | Director: Nathaniel Finston; Composer: Richard Rodgers; Lyrics by: Lorenz Hart | Sold over 3000 copies; From Love Me Tonight | |
| 1932 | "Veux-tu m'aimer"/"N'est-ce pas poétique" | Director: Nathiel Finston; Composer: Richard Rodgers; Lyrics by: Lorenz Hart | In French; From Veux-tu m'aimer (French version of Love Me Tonight) | |
| 1934 | "The Merry Widow Waltz"/"Vilia" | Director: Herbert Stothart (arranger, conductor); Composer: Franz Lehár; Lyrics by: Lorenz Hart | For the movie The Merry Widow | |
| 1934 | "Tonight Will Teach Me to Forget"/"Try to Forget" | Director: Herbert Stothart; Composer: Franz Lehár; Lyrics by: Gus Kahn | For the movie The Merry Widow | |
| 1935 | "Italian Street Song"/"Ah! Sweet Mystery of Life" | Director: Herbert Stothart; Composer: Victor Herbert; Lyrics by: Rida Johnson Young | From Naughty Marietta | |
| 1936 | "Indian Love Call"/"Ah! Sweet Mystery of Life" | Director: Nathaniel Shilkret; Composer: Rudolf Friml; Lyrics by: Otto Harbach, Oscar Hammerstein II | With Nelson Eddy; From Rose Marie; Gold record from RCA Red Seal | |
| 1937 | "Farewell to Dreams"/"Will You Remember?" | Director: Nathaniel Shilkret; Composer: Sigmund Romberg; Lyrics by: Gus Kahn | With Nelson Eddy; "Farewell to Dreams" was a deleted song; From Maytime | |

=== Selected list of other songs ===
| Year | Title | Lang. | Translation | Collab(s). | Album | Credits | Notes | Ref. |
|---|---|---|---|---|---|---|---|---|
| 1931 | "Dear, When I Met You" | English | — | — | — | Director: Ray Noble; Composer: A. Seymour Brown; Lyrics by: Albert von Tilzer | Recorded in London with His Master's Voice | |
| 1931 | "Reviens" | English | — | — | — | Director: Ray Noble; Composer: Harry Fragson; Lyrics by: Harry Fragson | Recorded in London with His Master's Voice | |
| 1931 | "Good Night" | English | — | — | — | Director: Ray Noble; Composer: Paul Abrahám; Lyrics by: Paul Abrahám | Recorded in London with His Master's Voice | |
| 1931 | "Pardon, Madame" | English | — | — | — | Director: Ray Noble; Composer: Paul Abrahám; Lyrics by: Paul Abrahám | Recorded in London with His Master's Voice | |
| 1933 | "J'aime d'amour" | French | "The Merry Widow Waltz" | — | — | Director: Herbert Stothart; Composer: Franz Lehár; Lyrics: Robert de Flers | Recorded in Paris with Disque Gramophone | |
| 1933 | "Chanson de Vilya" | French | | — | — | Director: Herbert Stothart (arranger, conductor); Composer: Franz Lehár; Lyrics by: Lorenz Hart | Recorded in Paris with Disque Gramophone | |
| 1939 | "When I Have Sung My Songs" | English | | Piano accompanist: Giuseppe Bamboschek | MacDonald in Songs (1939) | Director: Giuseppe Bamboschek; Composer: Ernest Charles; Lyrics by: Ernest Charles | | |
| 1939 | "Do Not Go, My Love" | English | | Piano accompanist: Giuseppe Bamboschek | MacDonald in Songs (1939) | Director: Giuseppe Bamboschek; Composer: Richard Hageman; Lyrics by: | — | |
| 1939 | "Annie Laurie" | English | | Piano accompanist: Giuseppe Bamboschek | MacDonald in Songs (1939) | Director: Giuseppe Bamboschek; Composer: Alicia Scott; Lyrics by: Alicia Scott, William Douglas | — | |
| 1939 | "Comin' Thro' the Rye (Old Scotch Air)" | English | — | Piano accompanist: Giuseppe Bamboschek | MacDonald in Songs (1939) | Director: Giuseppe Bamboschek; Composer: Lyrics by: Robert Burns | | |
| 1939 | "From the Land of the Sky-Blue Water" | English | — | — | MacDonald in Songs (1939) | Director: Giuseppe Bamboschek; Composer: Charles Wakefield Cadman; Lyrics by: Nelle Richmond Eberhart | | |
| 1939 | "Let Me Always Sing" | English | — | — | MacDonald in Songs (1939) | Director: Giuseppe Bamboschek; Composer: Gene Raymond; Lyrics: Gene Raymond | | |
| 1939 | "Ave Maria" | Latin | — | — | MacDonald in Songs (1939) | Director: Giuseppe Bamboschek; Composer: Bach; Lyrics by: Charles Gounod | From the opera Faust. | |
| 1939 | "Les Filles de Cadiz" | French | — | — | MacDonald in Songs (1939) | Director: Giuseppe Bamboschek; Composer: Léo Delibes; Lyrics by: Alfred de Musset | | |
| 1939 | "Il était un roi de Thulé" | French | | — | MacDonald in Songs (1939) | Director: Giuseppe Bamboschek; Composer: Lyrics by: Charles Gounod | | |
| 1939 | "Air des bijoux" | French | "The Jewel Song" | — | MacDonald in Songs (1939) | Director: Giuseppe Bamboschek; Composer: Charles Gounod; Lyrics by: Jules Barbier and Michel Carré | — | |
| 1939 | "Je veux vivre dans ce rêve" | French | "Juliette's Waltz Song" | — | — | Director: Giuseppe Bamboschek; Composer: Charles Gounod; Lyrics by: Jules Barbier and Michel Carré | | |
| 1939 | "Depuis le jour" | French | — | — | — | Director: Giuseppe Bamboschek; Creator: Gustave Charpentier | From the opera Louise | |
| 1939 | "Lover, Come Back to Me" | English | — | — | — | Director: Giuseppe Bamboschek; Composer: Sigmund Romberg; Lyrics by: Oscar Hammerstein II | For New Moon | |
| 1939 | "One Kiss" | English | — | — | — | Director: Giuseppe Bamboschek; Composer: Sigmund Romberg; Lyrics by: Oscar Hammerstein II | For New Moon | |
| 1941 | "Drink to Me Only with Thine Eyes" | English | — | — | — | Director: Herbert Stothart; Composer: Traditional; Lyrics by: Ben Jonson | For Smilin' Through | |
| 1941 | "Smilin' Through" | English | — | — | — | Director: Herbert Stothart; Composer: Arthur Penn; Lyrics by: Arthur Penn | For Smilin' Through | |
| 1941 | "The Kerry Dance" | English | — | — | — | Director: Herbert Stothart; Creator: L. J. Molloy | For Smilin' Through | |
| 1941 | "Ouvre ton coeur" | French | | — | — | Director: Herbert Stothart; Creator: Georges Bizet | For Smilin' Through | |
| 1941 | "A Little Love, a Little Kiss" | English | — | — | — | Director: Herbert Stothart; Composer: Leo Silèsu; Lyrics by: Adrian Ross | For Smilin' Through | |
| 1941 | "Land of Hope and Glory" | English | — | — | — | Director: Herbert Stothart; Composer: Edward Elgar; Lyrics by: A. C. Benson | For Smilin' Through | |
| 1945 | "Agnus Dei (Lamb of God)" | | — | — | Religious Songs (1945) | Director: Maximillian Pilzer; Original creator: Bizet | — | |
| 1945 | "O Lord Most Holy (Panis angelicus)" | ? | — | — | Religious Songs (1945) | Director: Maxmillian Pilzer; Composer: César Franck; Lyrics by: César Franck | — | |
| 1945 | "Summer Serenade" | English | — | — | — | Director: Maximillian Pilzer; Composer: Bob Wright; Lyrics by: Chet Forrest | — | |
| 1945 | "Italian Street Song" | English | — | — | — | Director: Maximillian Pilzer; Composer: Victor Herbert; Lyrics by: Rida Johnson Young | — | |
| 1945 | "Abide with Me" | English | — | — | Religious Songs (1945) | Director: Maximillian Pilzer; Composer: William Monk; Lyrics by: Henry F. Lyte | With mixed chorus | |
| 1945 | "Nearer My God to Thee" | English | — | — | Religious Songs (1945) | Director: Maximillian Pilzer; Composer: Lowell Mason; Lyrics by: Sarah F. Adams | With mixed chorus | |
| 1945 | "The Holy City" | English | — | — | Religious Songs (1945) | Director: Maxmillian Pilzer; Composer: Stephen Adams; Lyrics by: F. E. Weatherly | With mixed chorus | |
| 1945 | "Battle Hymn of the Republic" | English | — | — | Religious Songs (1945) | Director: Maximillian Pilzer; Composer: William Steffe; Lyrics by: Julia Ward Howe | With mixed chorus | |
| 1945 | "Carousel in the Park" | English | — | — | Up in Central Park (1945) | Director: Robert Russell Bennett; Composer: Sigmund Romberg; Lyrics by: Dorothy Fields | — | |
| 1945 | "It Doesn't Cost You Anything to Dream" | English | — | — | Up in Central Park (1945) | Director: Robert Russell Bennett; Composer: Sigmund Romberg; Lyrics by: Dorothy Fields | — | |
| 1945 | "Close as Pages in a Book" | English | — | Duet with Robert Merrill | Up in Central Park (1945) | Director: Robert Russell Bennett; Composer: Sigmund Romberg; Lyrics by: Dorothy Fields | — | |
| 1945 | "The Fireman's Bride" | English | — | Duet with Robert Merrill | Up in Central Park (1945) | Director: Robert Russell Bennett; Composer: Sigmund Romberg; Lyrics by: Dorothy Fields | — | |
| 1946 | "They Didn't Believe Me" | English | | | Operetta Moments (1946) | Director: Russ Case; Composer: Jerome Kern; Lyrics by: Michael E. Rourke | Song from the musical The Girl From Utah | |
| 1946 | "Giannina Mia" | English | | | Operetta Moments (1946) | Director: Russ Case; Composer: Rudolf Friml; Lyrics by: Otto Harbach | Song from The Firefly | |
| 1946 | "Smoke Gets in Your Eyes" | English | — | — | Operetta Moments (1946) | Director: Russ Case; Composer: Jerome Kern; Lyrics by: Otto Harbach | From Roberta | |
| 1946 | "Sweetheart Waltz" | English | — | — | Operetta Moments (1946) | Director: Russ Case; Composer: Victor Herbert; Lyrics by: Robert B. Smith | From Sweethearts | |
| 1946 | "Romany Life" | English | — | — | Operetta Moments (1946) | Director: Russ Case; Composer: Victor Herbert; Lyrics by: Harry B. Smith | From The Fortune Teller | |
| 1946 | "Donkey Serenade" | English | — | — | Operetta Moments (1946) | Director: Russ Case; Composer: Rudolf Friml; Lyrics by: Herbert Stothart | From The Firefly | |
| 1946 | "I Wish I May, I Wish I Might" | English | — | — | — | Director: Russ Case; Composer: William Provost; Lyrics by: Lee Rogrow | Featured in an audio adaptation of Cinderella by Michael Martin | |
| 1946 | "Look at Me, Look at Me" | English | — | — | — | Director: Russ Case; Composer: William Provost; Lyrics by: Lee Rogrow | Featured in an audio adaptation of Cinderella by Michael Martin | |
| 1946 | "Dancing the Waltz Tonight" | English | — | — | — | Director: Russ Case; Composer: William Provost; Lyrics by: Lee Rogrow | Featured in an audio adaptation of Cinderella by Michael Martin | |
| 1946 | "Today I've Found Prince Charming" | English | — | — | — | Director: Russ Case; Composer: William Provost; Lyrics by: Lee Rogrow | Featured in an audio adaptation of Cinderella by Michael Martin | |
| 1946 | "Mi chiamano Mimi" | Italian | — | — | — | Director: Frieder Weissmann; Composer: Giacomo Puccini; Lyrics: Giuseppe Giacosa and luigi Illica | — | |
| 1946 | "Un bel di vedremo" | Italian | — | — | — | Director: Frieder Weissmann; Composer: Giacomo Puccini; Lyrics: Giuseppe Giacosa and luigi Illica | — | |
| 1947 | "I'll See You Again" | English | — | — | — | Director: Robert Armbruster; Creator: Noël Coward | — | |
| 1947 | "Romance" | English | — | — | — | Director: Robert Armbruster; Composer: Claude Debussy; Lyrics by: Paul Bourget and Carman | — | |
| 1947 | "Beau Soir" | French | — | — | — | Director: Robert Armbruster; Composer: Claude Debussy; Lyrics by: Paul Bourget and Chapman | | |
| 1947 | "I Love You Truly" | English | — | — | — | Director: Robert Armbruster; Creator: Carrie Jacobs-Bond | — | |
| 1947 | "A Perfect Day" | English | — | — | — | Director: Robert Armbruster; Creator: Carrie Jacobs-Bond | — | |
| 1947 | "Springtide" | English | — | — | — | Director: Robert Armbruster; Composer: Edvard Grieg; Lyrics by: Aasmund Olavsson Vinje and Nathan Haskell Dole | — | |
| 1947 | "Where There's Love" | English | — | — | — | Director: Robert Armbruster; Composer: Richard Strauss; Lyrics by: Earl Brent | Based on waltzes from Der Rosenkavalier and was featured in Three Daring Daughters | |
| 1947 | "Summertime" | English | — | — | — | Director: Robert Armbruster; Composer: George Gershwin; Lyrics by: Ira Gershwin and DuBose Heyward | | |
| 1947 | "The Man I Love" | English | — | — | — | Director: Robert Armbruster; Composer: George Gershwin; Lyrics by: Ira Gershwin | | |
| 1947 | "Zigeuner" | English | — | — | — | Director: Robert Armbruster; Creator: Noël Coward | — | |
| 1949 | "Tes yeux" | | — | — | — | Director: Robert Armbruster; Creator: René Rabey | — | |
| 1949 | "Vilia" | English | — | — | — | Director: Robert Armbruster; Composer: Franz Lehár; Lyrics by: Adrian Ross | — | |
| 1949 | "If You Were Mine" | English | — | — | — | Director: Robert Armbruster; Composer: Lyrics by: | — | |
| 1949 | "Songs My Mother Taught Me" | English | — | — | — | Director: Robert Armbruster; Composer: Antonín Dvořák; Lyrics by: Adolf Heyduk | — | |
| 1950 | "Only a Rose" | English | — | — | Favorites | Director: Robert Russell Bennett; Composer: Rudolf Friml; Lyrics by: Brian Hooker | — | |
| 1950 | "Les Filles de Cadiz" | French | — | — | Favorites | Director: Robert Russell Bennett; Composer: Léo Delibes; Lyrics by: Alfred de Musset | — | |
| 1950 | "The Old Refrain" | English | — | — | — | Director: Robert Russell Bennett; Composer: Kreisler; Lyrics by: Mattullath | | |
| 1950 | "Beyond the Blue Horizon" | English | — | — | Favorites | Director: Robert Russell Bennett; Composer: W. Franke Harling and Richard A. Whiting; Lyrics by: Leo Robin | — | |
| 1950 | "Ciribiribin" | English | | | Favorites | Director: Robert Russell Bennett; Composer: Alberto Pestalozza; Lyrics by: Carlo Tiochet | — | |
| 1950 | "One Night of Love" | English | | | Favorites | Director: Robert Russell Bennett; Composer: Victor Schertzinger; Lyrics by: Gus Kahn | — | |
| 1950 | "Indian Love Call" | English | | | Favorites | Director: Robert Russell Bennett; Composer: Rudolf Friml; Lyrics by: Otto Harbach and Oscar Hammerstein II | — | |
| 1950 | "When You're Away" | English | — | — | Romantic Moments (1950) | Director: Robert Russell Bennett; Composer: Victor Herbert; Lyrics by: Heney Blossom | — | |
| 1950 | "One Alone" | English | — | — | Romantic Moments (1950) | Director: Robert Russell Bennett; Composer: Sigmund Romberg; Lyrics by: Oscar Hammerstein II, Otto Harbach | — | |
| 1950 | "Parlez-moi d'amour" | ? | — | — | Romantic Moments (1950) | Director: Robert Russell Bennett; Composer: Jean Lenoir; Lyrics by: Jean Lenoir | — | |
| 1950 | "Will You Remember?" | English | — | — | Romantic Moments (1950) | Director: Robert Russell Bennett; Composer: Sigmund Romberg; Lyrics by: Rida Johnson Young | — | |
| 1950 | "Ah! Sweet Mystery of Life" | English | — | — | Romantic Moments (1950) | Director: Robert Russell Bennett; Composer: Victor Herbert; Lyrics by: Rida Johnson Young | — | |
| 1950 | "San Francisco" | English | — | — | Romantic Moments (1950) | Director: Robert Russell Bennett; Composer: Bronislaw Kaper and Walter Jurmann; Lyrics by: Gus Kahn | — | |
| 1957 | "Indian Love Call" | English | — | Duet with Nelson Eddy | Favorites in Hi-Fi (1959) | Director: Lehman Engel; Composer: Rudolf Friml; Lyrics by: Otto Harbach and Oscar Hammerstein II | — | |
| 1957 | "Ah! Sweet Mystery of Life" | English | — | Duet with Nelson Eddy | Favorites in Hi-Fi (1959) | Director: Lehman Engel; Composer: Victor Herbert; Lyrics by: Rida Johnson Young | — | |
| 1957 | "Wanting You" | English | — | Duet with Nelson Eddy | Favorites in Hi-Fi (1959) | Director: Lehman Engel; Composer: Sigmund Romberg; Lyrics by: Oscar Hammerstein II | — | |
| 1957 | "Will You Remember?" | English | — | Duet with Nelson Eddy | Favorites in Hi-Fi (1959) | Director: Lehman Engel; Composer: Sigmund Romberg; Lyrics by: Gus Kahn | — | |
| 1958 | "Giannia Mia" | English | — | — | Favorites in Hi-Fi (1959) | Director: David Rose; Composer: Rudolf Friml; Lyrics by: Otto Harbach | — | |
| 1958 | "Beyond the Blue Horizon" | English | — | — | Favorites in Hi-Fi (1959) | Director: David Rose; Composer: W. Franke Harling and Richard A. Whiting; Lyrics by: Leo Robin | — | |
| 1958 | "Italian Street Song" | English | — | — | Favorites in Hi-Fi (1959) | Director: David Rose; Composer: Victor Herbert; Lyrics by: Rida Johnson Young | — | |
| 1958 | "The Breeze and I" | English | — | — | Favorites in Hi-Fi (1959) | Director: David Rose; Composer: Ernesto Lecuona; Lyrics by: Al Stillman | — | |

=== Unreleased ===
Note that many of the tracks included were re-recordings of tracks that had been released to the public prior.
| Year | Title | Lang. | Translation | Collab(s) | Credits | Notes | Ref. |
|---|---|---|---|---|---|---|---|
| 1930 | "Dream Lover" | English | — | — | Director: LeRoy Shield; Composer: Victor Schertzinger; Lyrics by: Clifford Grey | — | |
| 1933 | "Only a Rose" | English | — | — | Label: Disque Gramophone; Director: M. Bervily; Composer: Rudolf Friml; Lyrics by: Brian Hooker | Recorded in Paris with Disque Gramophone | |
| 1934 | "J'aime d'amour" | French | "The Merry Widow Waltz" | — | Director: Herbert Stothart; Composer: Franz Lehár; Lyrics: Robert de Flers | Second version; Recorded in Hollywood | |
| 1934 | "Mon coeur est las, mon coeur est lourd" | French | "Tonight Will Teach Me to Forget" | — | Director: Herbert Stothart; Composer: Lyrics | — | |
| 1934 | "Essayons d'oublier" | French | "Try to Forget" | — | Director: Herbert Stothart; Composer: Jerome Kern; Lyrics: Harold J. Salesmon (translated from Otto Harbach) | — | |
| 1935 | "Chanson italienne" | French | "Italian Street Song" | — | Director: Herbert Stothart; Composer: Victor Herbert; Lyrics: | — | |
| 1935 | "Mélodie du rêve" | French | "Ah! Sweet Mystery of Life" | — | Director: Herbert Stothart; Composer: Victor Herbert; Lyrics: | — | |
| 1936 | "Song of Love" | English | — | — | Director: Nathaniel Shilkret; Composer: Sigmund Romberg; Lyrics: Rida Johnson Young | Later included on Jeanette MacDonald and Nelson Eddy (Vintage Series) | |
| 1939 | "Depuis le jour" | French | — | — | Director: Giuseppe Bamboschek; Creator: Gustave Charpentier | — | |
| 1939 | "From the Land of the Sky-Blue Water" | English | — | Piano accompanyment by Gene Raymond | Director: Giuseppe Bamboschek; Composer: Charles Wakefield Cadman; Lyrics: Nelle Richmond Eberhart | — | |
| 1939 | "Let Me Always Sing" | English | — | Piano accompanyment by Gene Raymond | Director: Giuseppe Bamboschek; Composer: Gene Raymond; Lyrics: Gene Raymond | Two takes were recorded on September 16 and October 5 | |
