= Favorites in Stereo =

1959 studio album by Jeanette MacDonald and Nelson Eddy

Studio album by Jeanette MacDonald and Nelson Eddy
- Released: 1959
- Recorded: 1957 and 1958, New York, NY and Hollywood, CA, USA
- Genres: operetta, pop
- Length: 32:15
- Label: RCA Victor
- Producers: Simon Rady, Ed Welker

Professional ratings
Review scores
Source	Rating
Allmusic	4.5/5 stars

Favorites in Stereo is a studio album by Jeanette MacDonald and Nelson Eddy. The album was recorded in stereo and released by RCA Victor in 1959. For its monaural release the title was changed to Favorites in Hi-Fi. The album peaked at number 40 on the Billboard 200 chart. It was certified Gold by the Recording Industry Association of America on October 27, 1966.

== Background ==
Nelson Eddy and Jeanette MacDonald were a popular romantic screen team in a series of eight motion pictures produced by Metro-Goldwyn-Mayer between 1935 and 1942. The two reunited on a 1957 broadcast of the CBS Television series The Big Record starring Patti Page. Their performance of the "Italian Street Song" from their first film together, Naughty Marietta (1935) created a renewed interest for the team. As a result, RCA brought them together to record Favorites in Stereo. During its making, MacDonald feared that the changing music tastes of the public would cause the album to underperform, and was pleasantly surprised about the album's success.

== Reception ==
The album was popular with critics and audiences, selling over one million copies. In his review of the album music critic, Bruce Eder, noted: "The results are impressive, even though both singers' voices had darkened somewhat since their heyday of the '30s – the dimensionality of stereo separation is not pushed artificially, but the division of the voices and the perspective of the orchestral accompaniments does allow for some superb listening moments, particularly on "Italian Street Song" on side one."

The Democrat and Chronicle added: "[The album] showed the two singers in peak form." Phil Sheridan for The Philadelphia Inquirer made the album his Album Choice, predicting that "young and old will embrace this album" and praised the "memorable" performances as "singing in grand style[.]"

== Track listing ==
Side one
No.	Title	Lyrics	Music	Performed by	Length
1.	"Will You Remember?" (from Maytime)	Rida Johnson Young	Sigmund Romberg	Jeanette MacDonald and Nelson Eddy	2:48
2.	"Rosalie" (from Rosalie)	Cole Porter	Porter	Eddy	2:29
3.	"Giannina Mia" (from The Firefly)	Otto Harbach	Rudolf Friml	MacDonald	2:16
4.	"Rose Marie" (from Rose Marie)	Otto Harbach and Oscar Hammerstein II	Rudolf Friml and Herbert Stothart	Eddy	3:02
5.	"Italian Street Song" (from Naughty Marietta)	Rida Johnson Young	Victor Herbert	MacDonald	2:16
6.	"Indian Love Call" (from Rose-Marie)	Harbach and Hammerstein	Friml and Stothart	MacDonald and Eddy	2:16

Side two
No.	Title	Lyrics	Music	Performed by	Length
1.	"Ah, Sweet Mystery of Life" (from Naughty Marietta)	Young	Herbert	MacDonald and Eddy	3:19
2.	"The Breeze and I"	Al Stillman	Ernesto Lecuona	MacDonald	2:32
3.	"While My Lady Sleeps"	Bronisław Kaper	Gus Kahn	Eddy	3:26
4.	"Wanting You" (from New Moon)	Hammerstein	Romberg	MacDonald and Eddy	3:03
5.	"Stouthearted Men" (from New Moon)	Hammerstein	Romberg	Eddy	2:24
6.	"Beyond the Blue Horizon" (from Monte Carlo)	Leo Robin, Richard A. Whiting, and W. Franke Harling	Robin, Whiting, and Harling	MacDonald	2:24
