= Cairo (1942 film) =

1942 film by W. S. Van Dyke

- Theatrical poster
- Directed by: W. S. Van Dyke
- Written by: Concept: Ladislas Fodor
- Screenplay by: John McClain
- Produced by: Joseph L. Mankiewicz (uncredited)
- Starring: Jeanette MacDonald; Robert Young
- Cinematography: Ray June
- Edited by: James E. Newcom
- Music by: Score: Herbert Stothart; Songs: Arthur Schwartz (music); Yip Harburg (lyrics); Howard Dietz (lyrics)
- Production company: Metro-Goldwyn-Mayer
- Release date: August 17, 1942
- Running time: 101 minutes
- Country: United States
- Language: English
- Budget: $924,000
- Box office: $1,197,000

Cairo is a 1942 musical comedy film made by MGM and Loew's, and directed by W. S. Van Dyke. The screenplay was written by John McClain, based on an idea by Ladislas Fodor about a news reporter shipwrecked in a torpedo attack, who teams up with a Hollywood singer and her maid to foil Nazi spies. The music score is by Herbert Stothart. This film was Jeanette MacDonald's last film on her MGM contract.

The film was poorly received upon its initial release.

== Plot ==
American Homer Smith is the star reporter of a small newspaper, which is named the best small town newspaper in the country. As a reward for his contributions, he is sent to North Africa to report on the war. In the Mediterranean, however, his ship is sunk; he and one other survivor, Philo Cobson, make it to shore. Cobson reveals that he is a member of British Intelligence and asks Smith to give a coded message to a Mrs. Morrison in Cairo.

Mrs. Morrison tells him that motion picture star Marcia Warren is a Nazi spy. Smith, a big fan of Warren, has trouble believing it, but finds Warren's behavior suspect. He gets a job as her butler as Juniper Jones. Meanwhile, the innocent Warren begins to think that Smith is an enemy agent. Despite their mutual suspicions, they start to fall in love. Eventually, the real spies are unmasked: Cobson and Mrs. Morrison.

== Cast ==
- Jeanette MacDonald as Marcia Warren
- Robert Young as Homer Smith, aka Juniper Jones
- Ethel Waters as Cleona Jones, Marcia's Maid
- Reginald Owen as Philo Cobson
- Grant Mitchell as Mr. O.H.P. Boggs
- Lionel Atwill as Teutonic gentleman
- Eduardo Ciannelli as Ahmed Ben Hassan
- Mitchell Lewis as Ludwig
- Dooley Wilson as Hector
- Larry Nunn as Bernie
- Dennis Hoey as Col. Woodhue
- Mona Barrie as Mrs. Morrison
- Rhys Williams as Strange man
- Cecil Cunningham as Mme. Laruga
- Harry Worth as Viceroy Hotel bartender
- Frank Richards as Alfred
- Faten Hamama as Amina

== Reception ==
According to MGM records. the film earned $616,000 in the U.S. and Canada and $581,000 elsewhere, meaning the studio recorded a profit of $273,000.
