= Jeanette MacDonald =

American singer and actress (1903–1965)

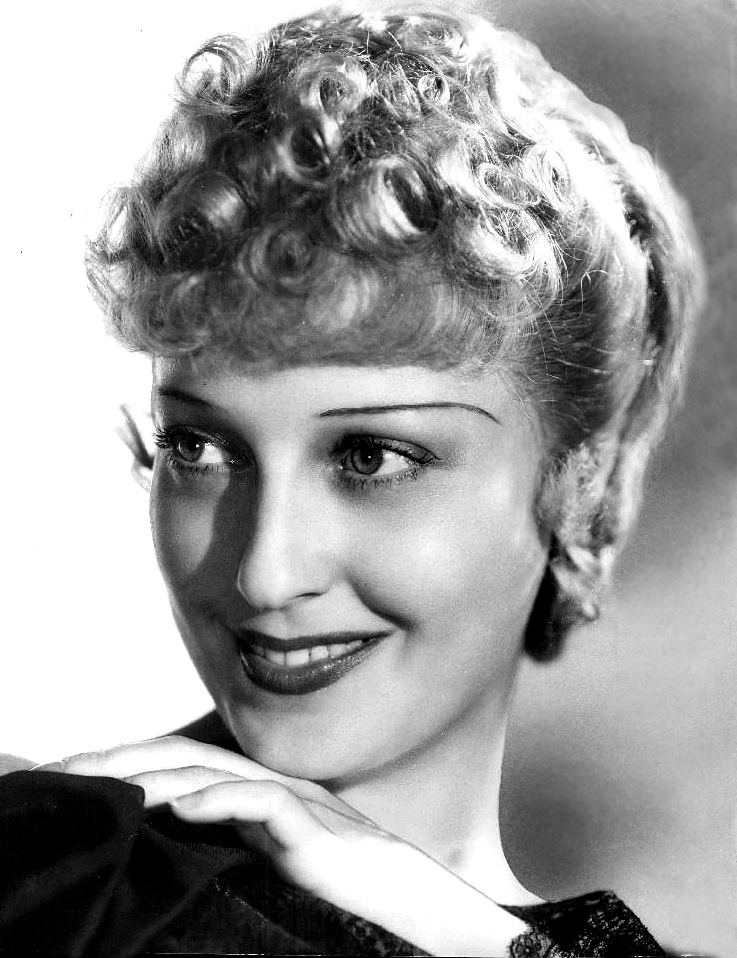
- MacDonald in 1934
- Born: Jeannette Anna McDonald; June 18, 1903; Philadelphia, Pennsylvania, U.S.
- Died: January 14, 1965 (aged 61); Houston, Texas, U.S.
- Resting place: Forest Lawn Memorial Park (Glendale, California)
- Other name: Jeanette MacDonald
- Occupations: Actress; singer; radio host; philanthropist
- Years active: 1909–1959
- Spouse: Gene Raymond (m. 1937)
- Partner: Nelson Eddy (1935-1965)
- Relatives: Blossom Rock (sister)
- Awards: 2 RCA Red Seal gold records (one for "Indian Love Call"/"Ah, Sweet Mystery of Life"); 1 RIAA gold record for Favorites in Hi-Fi; Screen Actors Guild award for Maytime; Hollywood Walk of Fame
- Musical career
- Genres: Opera/operetta; musical theater
- Instrument: Vocals (soprano)
- Labels: RCA Victor; RCA Red Seal Records; His Master's Voice; Disque Gramophone

Jeanette Anna MacDonald (June 18, 1903 – January 14, 1965) was an American soprano and actress best remembered for her musical films of the 1930s with Maurice Chevalier (The Love Parade, Love Me Tonight, The Merry Widow and One Hour with You) and Nelson Eddy (Naughty Marietta, Rose-Marie, and Maytime). During the 1930s and 1940s she starred in 29 feature films, four nominated for Best Picture Oscars (The Love Parade, One Hour with You, Naughty Marietta and San Francisco), and recorded extensively, earning three gold records. She later appeared in opera, concerts, radio, and television. MacDonald was one of the most influential sopranos of the 20th century, introducing opera to film-going audiences and inspiring a generation of singers.

== Early years ==
MacDonald was born Jeannette Anna McDonald on June 18, 1903, at her family's Philadelphia home at 5123 Arch Street. She was the youngest of the three daughters of Anna May (née Wright) and Daniel McDonald, a factory foreman and a salesman for a contracting household building company, respectively, and the younger sister of character actress Blossom Rock (born Edith McDonald, also known as Marie Blake), who was most famous as "Grandmama" on the 1960s TV series The Addams Family. She was of Scottish, English, and Dutch descent. The extra N in her given name was later dropped for simplicity's sake, and A added to her surname to emphasize her Scottish heritage. She began dancing lessons with local dance instructor Caroline Littlefield, mother of American ballerina/choreographer Catherine Littlefield, when very young, performing in juvenile operas, recitals, and shows staged by Littlefield around the city, including at the Academy of Music. She later took lessons with Al White and began touring in his kiddie shows, heading his "Six Little Song Birds" in Philadelphia at the age of nine.

== Acting career ==
=== Broadway ===
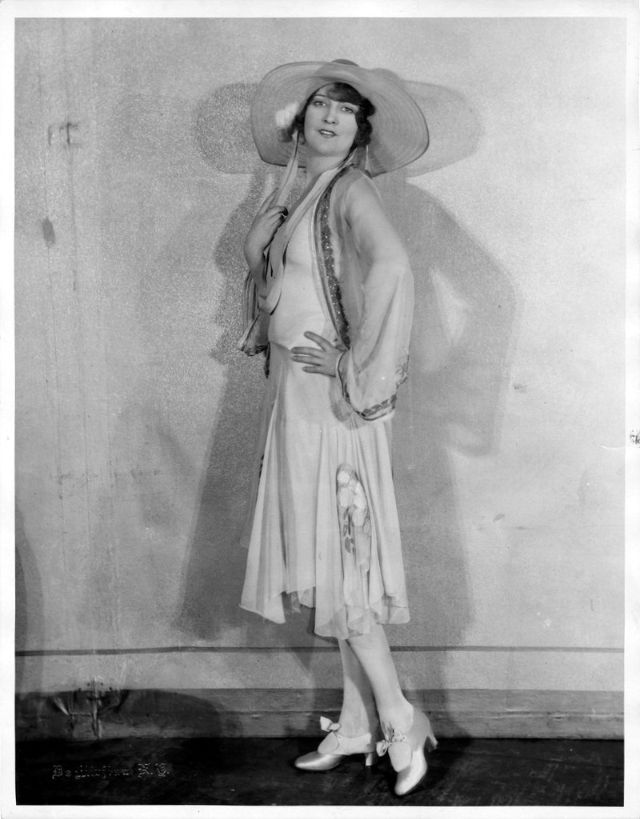
MacDonald backstage in a costume for the Broadway show Sunny Days (1928)

In November 1919, MacDonald joined her older sister Blossom in New York. She took singing lessons with Wassili Leps and landed a job in the chorus of Ned Wayburn's The Demi-Tasse Revue, a musical entertainment presented between films at the Capitol Theatre on Broadway. In 1920, she appeared in two musicals: Jerome Kern's The Night Boat as a chorus replacement, and Irene on the road as the second female lead; future film star Irene Dunne played the title role during part of the tour, and Helen Shipman played the title role during the other part of the tour. In 1921, MacDonald played in Tangerine as one of the "Six Wives". In 1922, she was a featured singer in the Greenwich Village revue Fantastic Fricassee, for which good press notices brought her a role in The Magic Ring the next year. MacDonald played the second female lead in this long-running musical which starred Mitzi Hajos. In 1925, MacDonald again had the second female lead opposite Queenie Smith in Tip Toes, a George Gershwin hit show.

The following year, 1926, found MacDonald still in a second female lead in Bubblin' Over, a musical version of Brewster's Millions. She finally landed a starring role in Yes, Yes, Yvette in 1927. Planned as a sequel to producer H.H. Frazee's No, No, Nanette, the show toured extensively, but failed to please the critics when it arrived on Broadway. MacDonald also played the lead in her next two plays: Sunny Days in 1928 in her first show for the producers Lee and J.J. Shubert, for which she received rave reviews; and Angela (1928), which the critics panned. Her last play was Boom Boom in 1929, with her name above the title; the cast included young Archie Leach, who would later become Cary Grant.

While MacDonald was appearing in Angela, film star Richard Dix spotted her and had her screen-tested for his film Nothing but the Truth. The Shuberts, however, would not let her out of her contract to appear in the film, which starred Dix and Helen Kane (the "Boop-boop-a-doop girl"). In 1929, famed film director Ernst Lubitsch was looking through old screen tests of Broadway performers and spotted MacDonald. He cast her as the leading lady in The Love Parade, his first sound film, which starred Maurice Chevalier.

=== Film career ===
==== Paramount, controversial move to Fox Film Corporation ====
In the first rush of sound films during 1929 and 1930, MacDonald starred in six films—the first four for Paramount Studios. Her first, The Love Parade (1929), directed by Ernst Lubitsch and co-starring Maurice Chevalier, was a landmark of early sound films, and received a Best Picture nomination. MacDonald's first recordings for RCA Victor were two hits from the score: "Dream Lover" and "March of the Grenadiers". The Vagabond King (1930) was a lavish two-strip Technicolor film version of Rudolf Friml's hit 1925 operetta. Broadway star Dennis King reprised his role as 15th-century French poet François Villon, and MacDonald was Princess Katherine. She sang "Some Day" and "Only a Rose". The UCLA Film and Television Archive owns the only known color print of this production.

Both Paramount and MacDonald were extremely busy in 1930. Paramount on Parade was an all-star revue, similar to other mammoth sound revues produced by major studios to introduce their formerly silent stars to the public. MacDonald's footage singing a duet of "Come Back to Sorrento" with Nino Martini was cut from the release print due to copyright reasons with Universal Studios, which had recently acquired the copyright to the song for an upcoming movie, King of Jazz. Let's Go Native was a desert-island comedy directed by Leo McCarey, co-starring the likes of Jack Oakie and Kay Francis. Monte Carlo became another highly regarded Lubitsch classic, with British musical star Jack Buchanan as a count who disguises himself as a hairdresser in order to woo a scatterbrained countess (MacDonald). MacDonald introduced "Beyond the Blue Horizon", which she recorded three times during her career, including performing it for the Hollywood Victory Committee film Follow the Boys.

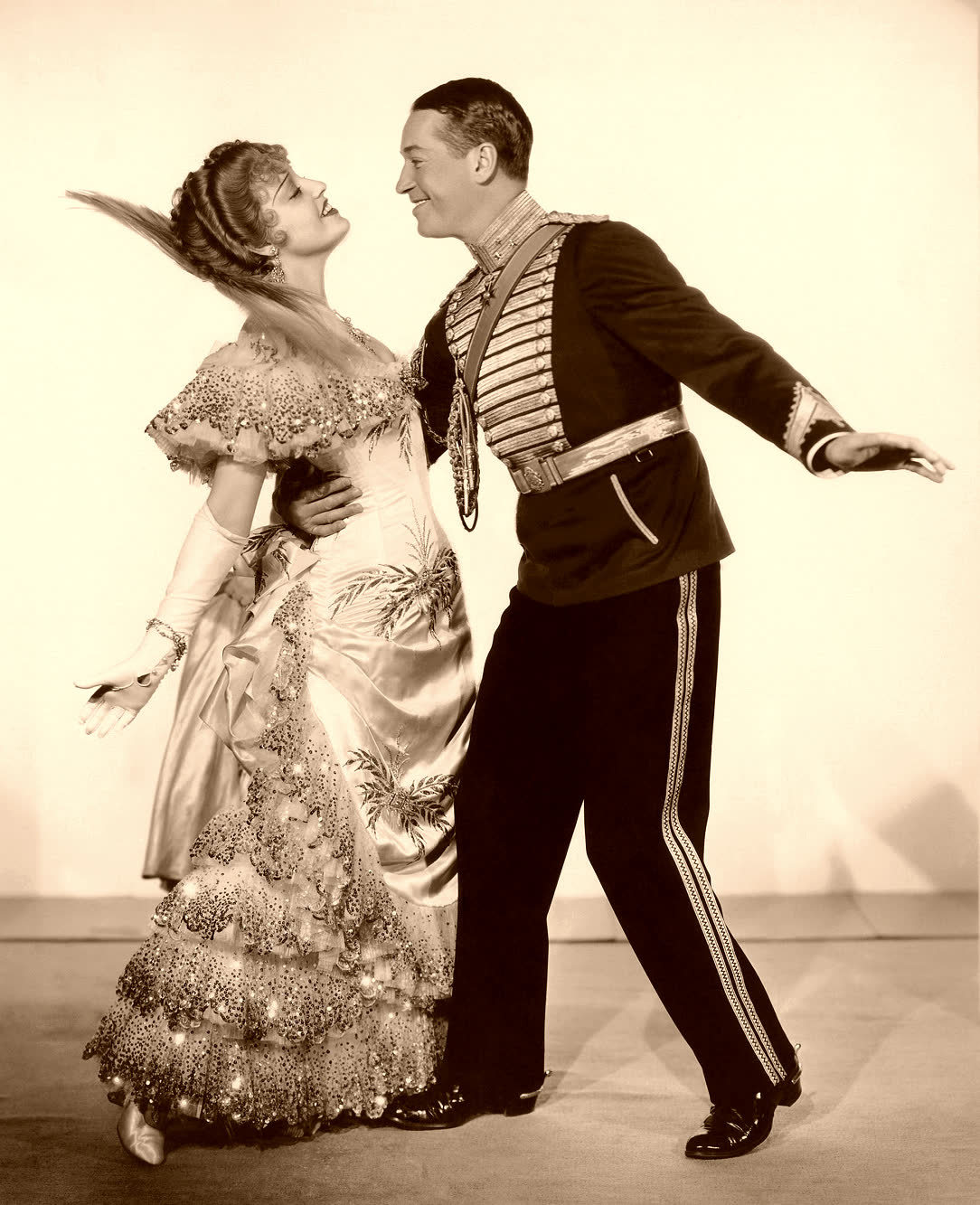
MacDonald with Maurice Chevalier in a promotional still for The Merry Widow (1934)

In hopes of producing her own films, MacDonald went to United Artists to make The Lottery Bride in 1930. Despite music by Rudolf Friml, the film was not successful. MacDonald next signed a three-picture deal with the Fox Film Corporation, a controversial move in Hollywood; every other studio was far superior in the eyes of many, from their budgets to the fantastical entertainment of their films. Oh, for a Man! (1930) was more successful; MacDonald portrayed a temperamental opera singer who sings Wagner's "Liebestod" and falls for an Irish burglar played by Reginald Denny. In 1931, Don't Bet on Women was a non-musical drawing-room comedy in which a playboy (Edmund Lowe) bets his happily married friend (Roland Young) that he can seduce his friend's wife (MacDonald). Annabelle's Affairs (1931) was a farce, with MacDonald as a sophisticated New York playgirl who does not recognize her own miner husband, played by Victor McLaglen, when he turns up five years later. Although highly praised by reviewers at the time, only one reel of this film survives.

MacDonald took a break from Hollywood in 1931 to embark on a European concert tour, performing at the Empire Theater in Paris (Mistinguett and Morris Gest were said to have been in the crowd) and at London's Dominion Theatre, and was invited to dinner parties with British Prime Minister Ramsay MacDonald and French newspaper critics. She returned to Paramount the following year for two films with Chevalier. One Hour with You in 1932 was directed by both George Cukor and Ernst Lubitsch, and simultaneously filmed in French with the same stars, but a French supporting cast. Currently, no surviving print of Une Heure près de toi (One Hour with You) is known. Rouben Mamoulian directed Love Me Tonight (1932), considered by many film critics and writers to be the perfect film musical. Starring Chevalier as a humble tailor in love with a princess played by MacDonald, much of the story is told in sung dialogue. Richard Rodgers and Lorenz Hart wrote the original score, which included the standards "Mimi", "Lover", and "Isn't It Romantic?"

==== MGM, Nelson Eddy partnership ====
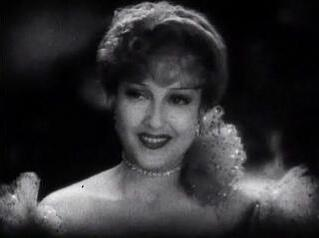
From the trailer for The Merry Widow (1934)

In 1933, MacDonald left again for Europe, and while there signed with Metro-Goldwyn-Mayer. Her first MGM film was The Cat and the Fiddle (1934), based on the Jerome Kern Broadway hit. Her co-star was Ramón Novarro. The plot about unmarried lovers shacking up just barely slipped through the new Production Code guidelines that took effect July 1, 1934. Despite a Technicolor finale—the first use of the new three-color Technicolor process other than Disney cartoons—the film was not a huge success. It lost $142,000. In The Merry Widow (1934), director Ernst Lubitsch reunited Maurice Chevalier and MacDonald in a lavish version of the classic 1905 Franz Lehár operetta. The film was highly regarded by critics and operetta lovers in major U.S. cities and Europe, but failed to generate much income outside urban areas, losing $113,000. It had a huge budget of $1.6 million, partially because it was filmed simultaneously in French as La Veuve Joyeuse, with a French supporting cast and some minor plot changes.

Naughty Marietta (1935), directed by W. S. Van Dyke, was MacDonald's first film in which she teamed with newcomer baritone Nelson Eddy. Victor Herbert's 1910 score, with songs like "Ah! Sweet Mystery of Life", "I'm Falling in Love with Someone", "'Neath the Southern Moon", "Tramp, Tramp, Tramp", and "Italian Street Song", enjoyed renewed popularity. The film won an Oscar for sound recording, and received an Oscar nomination for Best Picture. It was voted one of the Ten Best Pictures of 1935 by the New York film critics, was awarded the Photoplay Gold Medal Award as Best Picture of 1935 (beating out Mutiny on the Bounty, which won the Oscar), and in 2004 was selected to the National Film Registry. MacDonald earned gold records for "Ah! Sweet Mystery of Life" and "Italian Street Song". The following year, MacDonald starred in two of the highest-grossing films of that year. In Rose-Marie, MacDonald played a haughty opera diva who learns her young brother (pre-fame James Stewart) has killed a Mountie and is hiding in the northern woods; Eddy is the Mountie sent to capture him. Nelson Eddy and she sang Rudolf Friml's "Indian Love Call" to each other in the Canadian wilderness (actually filmed at Lake Tahoe). Eddy's definitive portrayal of the steadfast Mountie became a popular icon. When the Canadian Mounties temporarily retired their distinctive hat in 1970, photos of Eddy in his Rose Marie uniform appeared in thousands of U.S. newspapers. San Francisco (1936) was also directed by W.S. Van Dyke. In this tale of the 1906 San Francisco earthquake, MacDonald played a hopeful opera singer opposite Clark Gable as the extra-virile proprietor of a Barbary Coast gambling joint, and Spencer Tracy as his boyhood chum who has become a priest and gives the moral messages.

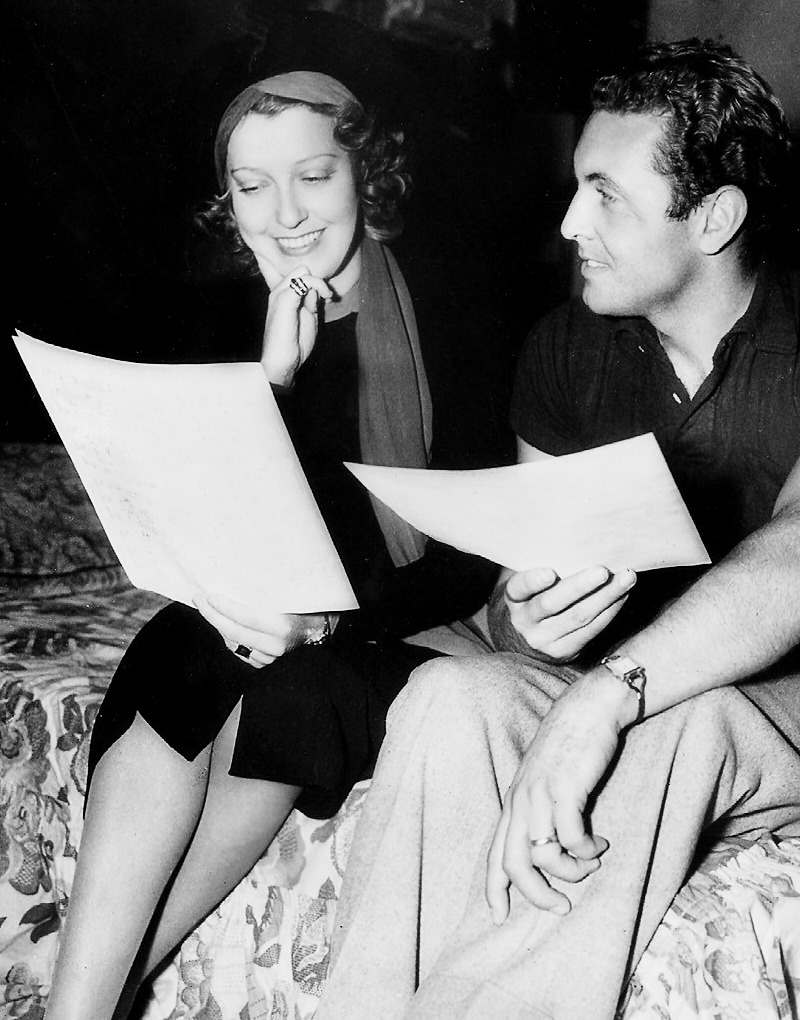
MacDonald and Allan Jones behind the scenes of The Firefly (1937)

In the summer of 1936, filming began on Maytime, co-starring Nelson Eddy, Frank Morgan, and Paul Lukas, produced by Irving Thalberg. After Thalberg's untimely death in September, production was shut down and the half-finished film scrapped. A new script was filmed with a different storyline and supporting actors (including John Barrymore, whose relationship with MacDonald was strained due to his alcoholism). The 'second' Maytime (1937), was the top-grossing film worldwide of the year, and is regarded as one of the best film musicals of the 1930s. "Will You Remember" by Sigmund Romberg brought MacDonald another gold record.

The Firefly (1937) was MacDonald's first solo-starring film at MGM with her name alone above the title. Rudolf Friml's 1912 stage score was borrowed, and a new song, "The Donkey Serenade", added, adapted from Friml's "Chanson" piano piece. With real-life Americans rushing to fight in the ongoing revolution in Spain, this historical vehicle was constructed around a previous revolution in Napoleonic times. MacDonald's co-star was tenor Allan Jones, who she demanded get the same treatment as she would, such as an equal number of close-ups. The MacDonald/Eddy team had split after MacDonald's engagement and marriage to Gene Raymond, but neither of their solo films grossed as much as the team films, and an unimpressed Mayer used this to point out why Jones could not replace Eddy in the next project. The Girl of the Golden West (1938) was the result, but the two stars had little screen time together, and the main song, "Obey Your Heart", was never sung as a duet. The film featured an original score by Sigmund Romberg, and reused the popular David Belasco stage plot (also employed by opera composer Giacomo Puccini for La fanciulla del West).

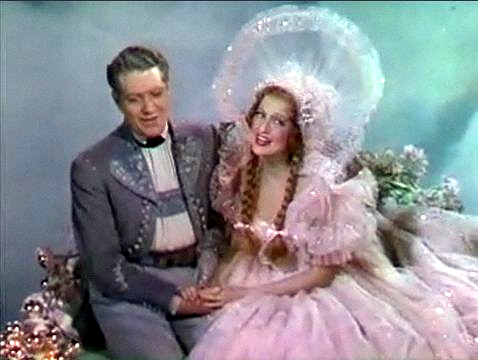
Eddy and MacDonald from the trailer for Sweethearts (1938)

Mayer had promised MacDonald the studio's first Technicolor feature, and he delivered with Sweethearts (1938), co-starring Eddy. In contrast to the previous film, the co-stars were relaxed onscreen and singing frequently together. The film integrated Victor Herbert's 1913 stage score into a modern backstage story scripted by Dorothy Parker and Alan Campbell. MacDonald and Eddy played a husband-and-wife Broadway musical-comedy team who are offered a Hollywood contract. Sweethearts won the Photoplay Gold Medal Award as Best Picture of the Year. Mayer dropped plans for the team to co-star in Let Freedom Ring, a vehicle first announced for them in 1935. Only Eddy starred, whereas MacDonald and Lew Ayres co-starred in Broadway Serenade (1939) as a contemporary musical couple who clash when her career flourishes while his founders. MacDonald's performance was subdued, and choreographer Busby Berkeley, just hired away from Warner Bros., was called upon to add an over-the-top finale in an effort to improve the film. Broadway Serenade did not entice audiences in a lot of major cities, with Variety claiming that New York, Chicago, and Los Angeles' cinema attendances were "sad", "slow", and "sour".

Following Broadway Serenade, and not coincidentally right after Nelson Eddy's surprise elopement with Ann Franklin, MacDonald left Hollywood on a concert tour and refused to renew her MGM contract. Months later she summoned her manager Bob Ritchie from London to help her renegotiate. After initially insisting that she wanted to film Smilin' Through with James Stewart and Robert Taylor, MacDonald finally relented and agreed to film New Moon (1940) with Eddy, which proved to be one of MacDonald's more popular films. Composer Sigmund Romberg's 1927 Broadway hit provided the plot and the songs: "Lover, Come Back to Me", "One Kiss", and "Wanting You", plus Eddy's version of "Stout Hearted Men". This was followed by Bitter Sweet (1940), a Technicolor film version of Noël Coward's 1929 stage operetta, which Coward loathed, writing in his diary about how "vulgar" he found it. Smilin' Through (1941) was MacDonald's next Technicolor project, the third adaptation filmed in Hollywood, with Brian Aherne and Gene Raymond. Its theme of reunion with deceased loved ones was enormously popular after the devastation of World War I, and MGM reasoned that it should resonate with audiences during World War II, but it failed to make a profit. MacDonald played a dual role—Moonyean, a Victorian girl accidentally murdered by a jealous lover, and Kathleen, her niece, who falls in love with the son of the murderer.

I Married an Angel (1942), was adapted from the Rodgers & Hart stage musical about an angel who loses her wings on her wedding night. The script by Anita Loos suffered serious censorship cuts during filming that made the result less successful. MacDonald sang "Spring Is Here" and the title song. It was the final film made by the team of MacDonald and Eddy. After a falling-out with Mayer, Eddy bought out his MGM contract (with one film left to make) and went to Universal, where he signed a million-dollar, two-picture deal. MacDonald remained for one last film, Cairo (1942), a cheaply budgeted spy comedy co-starring Robert Young as a reporter and Ethel Waters as a maid, whom MacDonald personally requested. Within one year, beginning in 1942, L.B. Mayer released his four highest-paid actresses from their MGM contracts; Norma Shearer, Joan Crawford, Greta Garbo, and Jeanette MacDonald. Of those four stars, MacDonald was the only one whom Mayer would rehire.

==== Final roles ====
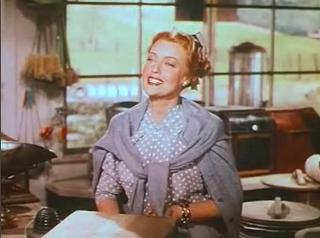
From the trailer for The Sun Comes Up (1949)

After opening the Metropolitan Opera's membership campaign, MacDonald appeared as herself in Follow the Boys (1944), an all-star extravaganza about Hollywood stars entertaining the troops. The more than 40 guest stars included Marlene Dietrich, W.C. Fields, Sophie Tucker, and Orson Welles. MacDonald is shown during a concert singing "Beyond the Blue Horizon", and in a studio-filmed sequence singing "I'll See You in My Dreams" to a blinded soldier. She returned to MGM after five years off the screen for two films. Three Daring Daughters (1948) co-starred José Iturbi as her love interest. MacDonald plays a divorcée whose lively daughters (Jane Powell, Ann E. Todd, and Elinor Donahue) keep trying to get her back with her ex, but she has secretly remarried. The song "The Dickey Bird" made the hit parade. The Sun Comes Up (1949) teamed MacDonald with Lassie in an adaptation of a short story by Marjorie Kinnan Rawlings. MacDonald played a widow who has lost her son, but warms to orphan Claude Jarman Jr. It would prove to be her final film.

She frequently attempted a comeback movie, even financing and paying a screenwriter. One of the possible film reunions with Nelson Eddy was to be made in England, but Eddy pulled out when he learned MacDonald was investing her own funds. Eddy preferred to publicly blame the proposed project as mediocre, when in fact MacDonald was uninsurable due to her heart condition. A reunion with Maurice Chevalier was also considered. Other thwarted projects with Eddy were The Rosary, The Desert Song, and a remake of The Vagabond King, plus two movie treatments written by Eddy for them, Timothy Waits for Love and All Stars Don't Spangle. Offers continued to come in, and in 1962, producer Ross Hunter proposed MacDonald in his 1963 comedy The Thrill of It All, but she declined. 20th Century Fox also toyed with the idea of MacDonald (Irene Dunne was briefly considered) for the part of Mother Abbess in the film version of The Sound of Music. It never moved beyond the discussion stages partly because of MacDonald's failing health.

An annual poll of film exhibitors listed MacDonald as one of the top-10 box-office draws of 1936, and many of her films were among the top-20 moneymakers of the years they were released. In addition, MacDonald was one of the top-10 box-office attractions in Great Britain from 1937 to 1942. During her 39-year career, MacDonald earned two stars on the Hollywood Walk of Fame (for films and recordings) and planted her feet in the wet concrete in front of Grauman's Chinese Theater.

=== Musical theatre ===
In the mid-1950s, MacDonald toured in summer-stock productions of Bitter Sweet and The King and I. She opened in Bitter Sweet at the Iroquois Amphitheater, Louisville, Kentucky, on July 19, 1954. Her production of The King and I opened August 20, 1956, at the Starlight Theatre. While performing there, she collapsed. Officially, it was announced as heat prostration, but in fact it was a heart seizure. She began limiting her appearances, and a reprisal of Bitter Sweet in 1959 was her last professional stage appearance.

MacDonald and her husband Gene Raymond toured in Ferenc Molnár's The Guardsman. The production opened at the Erlanger Theater in Buffalo, New York, on January 25, 1951, and played in 23 Northeastern and Midwestern cities until June 2, 1951. Despite less-than-enthusiastic comments from critics, the show played to full houses for virtually every performance. The leading role of "The Actress" was changed to "The Singer" to allow MacDonald to add some songs. While this pleased her fans, the show closed before reaching Broadway.

In the 1950s, talks with respect to a Broadway return occurred. In the 1960s, MacDonald was approached about starring on Broadway in a musical version of Sunset Boulevard. Harold Prince recounts in his autobiography visiting MacDonald at her home in Bel Air to discuss the proposed project. Composer Hugh Martin also wrote a song for the musical, entitled "Wasn't It Romantic?"

MacDonald also made a few nightclub appearances. She sang and danced at The Sands and The Sahara in Las Vegas in 1953, The Coconut Grove in Los Angeles in 1954, and again at The Sahara in 1957, but she never felt entirely comfortable in their smoky atmospheres.

== Music career ==
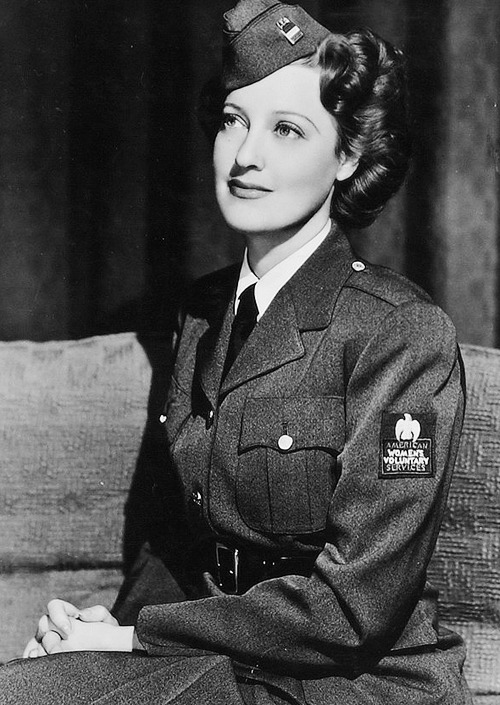
MacDonald dressed in an American Women's Voluntary Services uniform (c. 1942)

=== Concert tours, World War II charity work ===
Starting in 1931 and continuing through the 1950s, MacDonald engaged in regular concert tours between films. Her first European tour was in 1931, where she sang in both France and England. Her first American concert tour was in 1939, immediately after the completion of Broadway Serenade. MacDonald performed at the Mayo Civic Auditorium in Rochester, Minnesota on April 19, 1939, to open that venue before an audience. She sang several times at the Hollywood Bowl and Carnegie Hall. When America joined World War II in 1941, MacDonald co-founded the Army Emergency Relief and raised funds on concert tours. When she was home in Hollywood, she held an open house at her home on Sunday afternoons for GIs. On one occasion, at the request of Lt. Ronald Reagan, she was singing for a large group of men in San Francisco who were due to ship out to the fierce fighting in the South Pacific. She closed with "The Battle Hymn of the Republic", and 20,000 voices spontaneously joined in. She auctioned off encores for donations and raised almost $100,000 for the troops (over $1.5 million, adjusted for inflation). President Franklin D. Roosevelt, who considered MacDonald and Eddy two of his favorite film stars, awarded her a medal. She also did command performances at the White House for President Dwight D. Eisenhower.

=== Opera ===
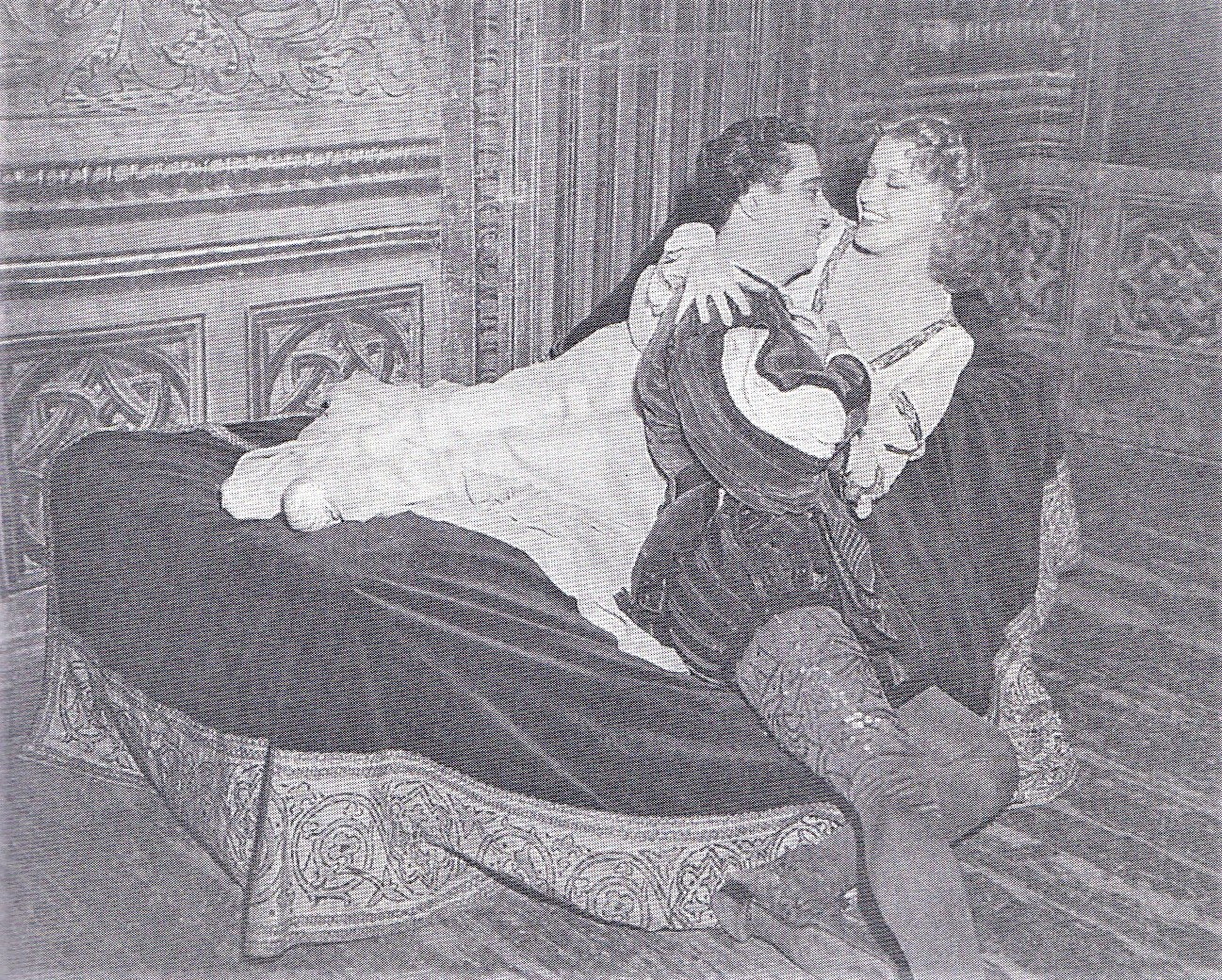
MacDonald rehearsing with Armand Tokatyan for Roméo et Juliette in Montreal, 1943

Unlike Nelson Eddy, who came from opera to film, MacDonald in the 1940s yearned to reinvent herself in opera. She began training for this goal with Lotte Lehmann, one of the leading opera stars of the early 20th century. "When Jeanette MacDonald approached me for coaching lessons", wrote Lehmann, "I was really curious how a glamorous movie star, certainly spoiled by the adoration of a limitless world, would be able to devote herself to another, a higher level of art. I had the surprise of my life. There couldn't have been a more diligent, a more serious, a more pliable person than Jeanette. The lessons which I had started with a kind of suspicious curiosity turned out to be sheer delight for me. She studied Marguerite with me—and lieder. These were the ones which astounded me most. I am quite sure that Jeanette would have developed into a serious and successful lieder singer if time would have allowed it."

MacDonald made her opera debut singing Juliette in Gounod's Roméo et Juliette in Montreal at His Majesty's Theatre (May 8, 1943). She quickly repeated the role in Quebec City (May 12), Ottawa (May 15 and 17), Toronto (May 20 and 22), and Windsor (May 24). Her U.S. debut with the Chicago Opera Company (November 4, 11 and 15, 1944) was in the same role. She also sang Marguerite in Gounod's Faust with the Chicago Opera. In the summer of 1945, she appeared with the Cincinnati Opera as Juliette in two performances of Roméo et Juliette (July 10 and 25) and one as Marguerite in Faust (July 15). That November, she did two more performances of Roméo et Juliette and one of Faust in Chicago. On December 12, 1951, she did one performance of Faust with the Philadelphia Civic Grand Opera Company at the Academy of Music.

Claudia Cassidy, the music critic of the Chicago Tribune wrote, "Her Juliet is breathtakingly beautiful to the eye and dulcet to the ear." The same critic reviewed Faust: "From where I sit at the opera, Jeanette MacDonald has turned out to be one of the welcome surprises of the season ... her Marguerite was better than her Juliet ... beautifully sung with purity of line and tone, a good trill, and a Gallic inflection that understood Gounod's phrasing ... You felt if Faust must sell his soul to the devil, at least this time he got his money's worth."

== Radio and television ==
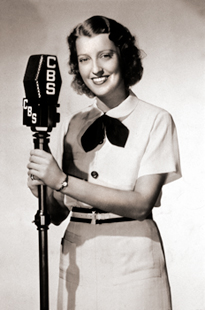
A promotional photo of MacDonald for Vicks Open House (1937)

MacDonald's extensive radio career may have begun on a 1929 radio broadcast of the Publix Hour. She was on the Academy Awards ceremony broadcast in 1931. She hosted her own radio show, Vicks Open House, from September 1937 to March 1938, for which she received $5,000 a week. However, the time demands of doing a weekly live radio show while filming, touring in concerts, and making records proved enormously difficult, and after fainting on-air during one show, she decided not to renew her radio contract with Vicks at the end of the 26-week season. Thereafter, she stuck to guest appearances.

MacDonald appeared in condensed radio versions of many of her films on programs such as Cecil B. DeMille's Lux Radio Theater, often with Nelson Eddy, and the Railroad Hour, which starred Gordon MacRae. These included The Merry Widow, Naughty Marietta, Rose Marie, Maytime, Sweethearts, Bitter Sweet, Smilin' Through, and The Sun Comes Up, plus other operettas and musicals such as Victor Herbert's Mlle Modiste, Irene, The Student Prince, Tonight or Never with Melvyn Douglas, A Song for Clotilda, The Gift of the Magi, and Apple Blossoms. Other radio shows included The Prudential Family Hour, Screen Guild Playhouse, and The Voice of Firestone, which featured the top opera and concert singers of the time. In 1953, MacDonald sang "The Star-Spangled Banner" at the inauguration of President Dwight D. Eisenhower, broadcast on both radio and TV.

MacDonald sang frequently with Nelson Eddy during the mid-1940s on several Lux Radio Theater and The Screen Guild Theater productions of their films together. She also appeared as his guest several times on his various radio shows such as The Electric Hour and The Kraft Music Hall. He was also a surprise guest when she hosted a war-bonds program called Guest Star, and they sang on other World War II victory shows together. The majority of her radio work in the mid to late 1940s was with Eddy. Her 1948 Hollywood Bowl concert was also broadcast over the air, in which she used Eddy's longtime accompanist, Theodore Paxson.

MacDonald appeared on early TV, most frequently as a singing guest star. She sang on The Voice of Firestone on November 13, 1950. On November 12, 1952, she was the subject of Ralph Edwards' This Is Your Life. Her surprise guests included her sisters, a sailor she danced with at the Hollywood Canteen, her former English teacher, her husband and the clergyman who married them, and Nelson Eddy appeared as a voice from her past, singing the song he sang at her wedding; his surprise appearance brought her to tears. Shortly thereafter, she appeared as the mystery guest on the December 21, 1952, episode of What's My Line? After the panelists guessed her identity, she told John Daly she was in New York for the holidays and would have a recital at Carnegie Hall on January 16. On February 2, 1956, MacDonald starred in Prima Donna, a television pilot for her own series, written for her by her husband Gene Raymond. The initial show featured guest stars Leo Durocher and Larraine Day, but it failed to find a slot. In December 1956, MacDonald and Eddy made their first TV appearance as a team on the Lux Video Theatre Holiday Special. In 1957, Eddy and she appeared on Patti Page's program The Big Record, singing several songs. On Playhouse 90 (March 28, 1957), MacDonald played Charley's real aunt to Art Carney's impersonation in Charley's Aunt.

== Personal life ==
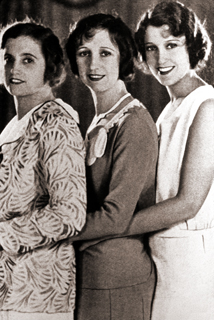
MacDonald (right) with her sisters Blossom Rock (middle) and Elsie (left) (c. 1920s)

When MacDonald was born, her father quickly doted on her. Although he had hoped for a son who would pursue "an American dream" life that he believed he had failed to live himself, he advised his three daughters to do this instead. MacDonald was the only daughter in the family that had inherited both her father's red hair and blue-green eyes, although she often admired her sisters' beauty, such as Blossom's dimples and her elder sister Elsie's (1893—1970) blonde hair and blue eyes. Elsie could play the piano, and taught toddler MacDonald a variety of popular waltzes and Stephen Foster's compositions. At this time, MacDonald discovered that she was an extrovert who enjoyed socializing with friends and performing for others, admitting that "[I] needed people to watch and applaud me as much as I needed food and drink." At the end of her first performance in the local church as a child, "I paused ever so slightly and then, when I realized they needed prodding, I promptly began clapping my hands and said to the congregation, 'Now everybody's got to clap!'"

MacDonald cited the number thirteen as her lucky number. Her characters always had a name beginning with M, the first letter of her surname and the 13th letter of the English alphabet, a ritual upon which she had insisted. Interestingly, thirteen became a recurring number throughout her life, such as the thirteen-year gap between her overseas tours in Europe; principal photography for The Merry Widow had taken thirteen weeks to film; her first movie, The Love Parade, was the number-one box-office draw for 13 weeks; MacDonald performed opera for the first time for a screen test thirteen years after meeting Newell (who was also on set); the thirteen-year gap between her and sister Blossom's death; and husband Gene Raymond's birthday was August 13.

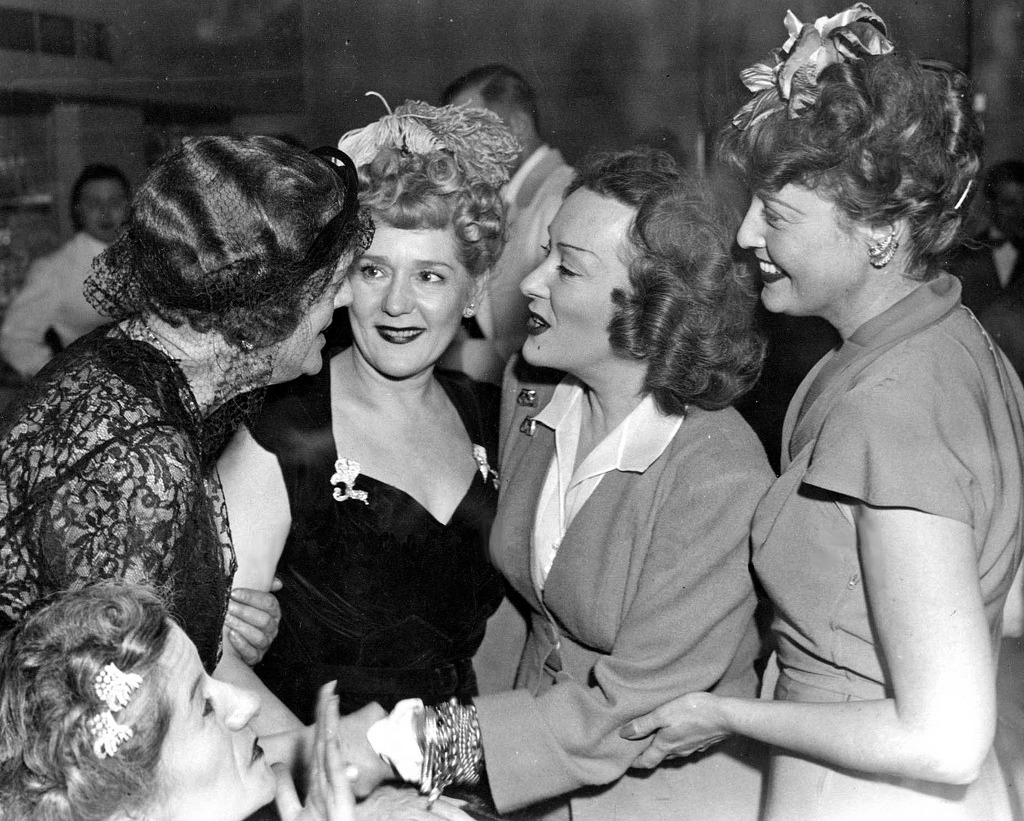
MacDonald (right), with Harriet Kriesler, Mary Pickford and Gloria Swanson at the Stork Club in 1944

On sets, MacDonald would never lip-sync, instead singing along to song playbacks during filming, which Lew Ayres discovered when he starred alongside her in Broadway Serenade, whereupon he was supplied with earplugs after the volume nauseated him.

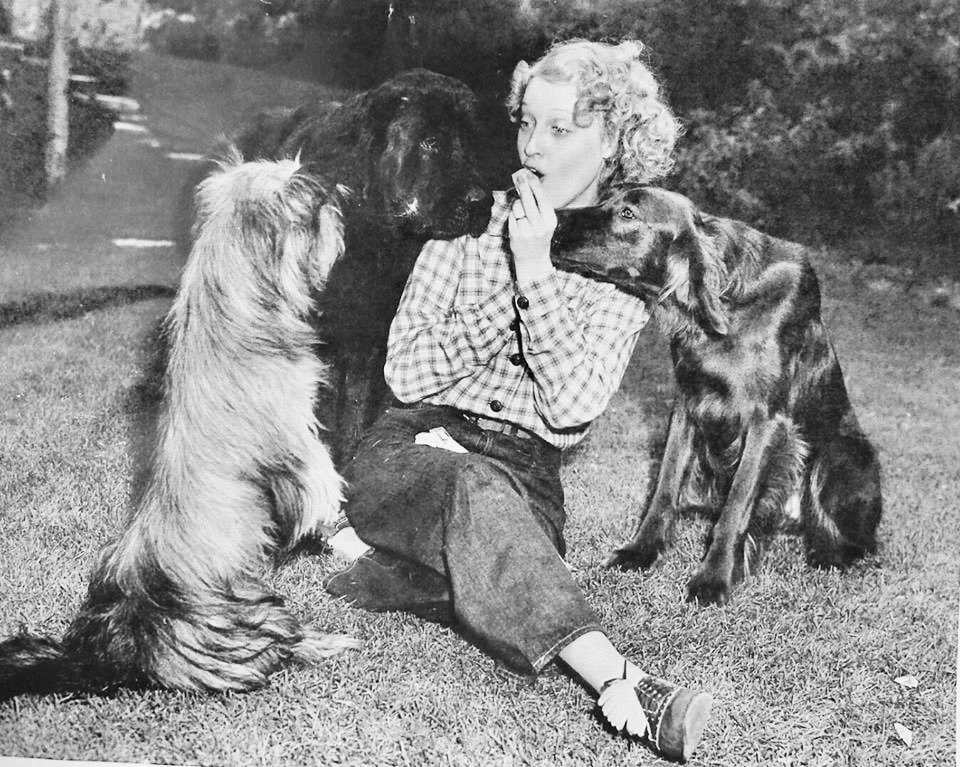
MacDonald playing with three of her dogs in the Twin Gables garden. Despite being allergic to dogs, MacDonald has been quoted saying, "A MacDonald home without dogs is like ham without eggs." (c. mid-to-late 1930s)

A recurrent issue throughout MacDonald's career was her health. Her handwritten letter from August 1929 indicates that MacDonald, age 26, had recently suffered a heart attack. She also suffered from stage fright throughout her life to the point that her therapist told her to imagine that all of the members of the audience were lettuce. Due to her heart condition, she could not carry a pregnancy to term; she had blackouts and fainting spells, became stressed to the point of not being able to eat, and was frequently in and out of hospitals and trying different treatments (one being massage therapy), which only worked for a limited time. A few years before her death, MacDonald became a Religious Scientist. Her illnesses would not allow her to perform early morning filming shoots, much to her colleagues' annoyance.

MacDonald was a Republican, but she mostly avoided commenting on politics. When approached by the House Un-American Activities Committee about whether she had heard any gossip about Communist activity in Hollywood, she replied, "As at any focal point, there are some belligerents, but they are no more numerous than in any other community." Neither she nor Gene Raymond were ever considered or subpoenaed for a HUAC hearing; in a radio interview, MacDonald was quoted as saying, "Let he who is without sin cast the first stone" in response to what her opinion was on the investigations. She fired her manager Charles Wagner for anti-Semitic abuse of her Jewish friend Constance Hope, and declared during the 1940 presidential election, "I sing for Democrats and Republicans, black and white, everyone, and I just can't talk politics."

=== Relationships ===
MacDonald met Jack Ohmeis (1901–1967) at a party during her appearance in Tangerine. He was an architecture student at New York University and the son of a successful bottle manufacturer. His family was hesitant about the relationship, assuming that MacDonald was a gold-digger, but accepted her after they met. She and Ohmeis became engaged a year later, but their future plans and aspirations forced them to go their separate ways; the sudden death of MacDonald's father was another factor in the break-up. Unfortunately, the Ohmeis family would lose a lot of their fortune after the Wall Street Crash, so MacDonald loaned money to Jack, and he repaid her as soon as he could, which was as late as the 1950s. MacDonald next dated Irving Stone (1901-1968) from around 1926–28; they met when she was touring in Chicago in The Magic Ring. Stone, who lived in Milwaukee, was the nephew of the founder of the Wisconsin Boston Store, and worked in the family business. Few details were known of Stone's romance with MacDonald until the discovery of hundreds of pages of handwritten love letters she wrote to him that were found in his apartment after his death, which happened three years after her death.

MacDonald eventually dated a Wall Street rep named Robert Ritchie (died 1972), 12 years her senior, who claimed that he was the son of a fallen millionaire. They traveled with MacDonald's family to Hollywood, and he became a press agent for MGM. Rumors circulated that they were engaged and/or secretly married, since Ritchie was by MacDonald's side during her European tour and they lived together—MacDonald even signing her return address as "JAR" (Jeanette Anna Ritchie) and referring to him as her "darling husband". Despite Ritchie's family claiming that he was married to MacDonald but the marriage had been annulled in 1935, he never confirmed the claims. He later relocated to Europe as an MGM representative, becoming responsible for recruiting Greer Garson, Hedy Lamarr, and Luise Rainer.

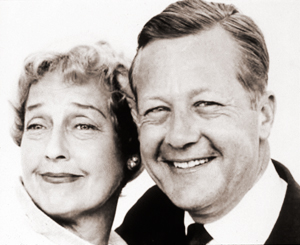
MacDonald with husband Gene Raymond in the late 1950s

MacDonald married Gene Raymond in 1937. She met him at a Hollywood party two years earlier at Roszika Dolly's home; MacDonald agreed to a date, as long as it was at her family's dinner table. Despite the strong relationship, Raymond's mother did not like MacDonald, attempting to snub her a few times (such as arranging her son with Janet Gaynor as a plus-one at a charity ball), and did not attend the wedding. The Raymonds lived in a 21-room Mock Tudor mansion named Twin Gables with their pet dogs and their horse White Lady, which Raymond gave to MacDonald as a birthday present; after MacDonald's death, it was briefly owned by John Phillips and Michelle Phillips of The Mamas and Papas. MacDonald often worried about her husband's self-esteem; his acting career was constantly shaky, and RKO Pictures eventually sold out his contract when he had two movies left to make with them in the 1950s. Although she appreciated his support, MacDonald wished that their success was equal.

Raymond was sometimes mistaken for Nelson Eddy by MacDonald's fans and passersby, which MacDonald later admitted that she never liked: "Of course we always laughed it off—sometimes Gene even obliged by signing Nelson's name—but no one will ever know the agonies I suffered on such occasions. More than anything else in the world those days, I wanted to see him receive as much acclaim as I, to spare him these humiliations." When she reunited with Chevalier in 1957, he asked her why she had retired from films, to which she replied, "Because for exactly twenty years I've played my best role, by his [Raymond's] side. And I'm perfectly happy."

=== Autobiography ===
MacDonald began developing an autobiography in the 1950s. She wanted her readers to both be inspired by her career and understand how she had coped with balancing a public and personal life. In one early version she intended to candidly discuss Nelson Eddy but dropped that idea when Eddy feared public fallout. She hired and fired other ghostwriters and wrote a manuscript solo but it was rejected by the publisher for being "too genteel"; MacDonald refused to include many personal details about Eddy and she deleted already typed pages admitting to one single pregnancy that ended in miscarriage. Her last ghost writer, Fredda Dudley Balling, noted that MacDonald was too ill to work more than a couple hours a day, so a final draft was never completed. The unfinished manuscript was published and annotated in 2004. MacDonald said that publishers wanted her to spice up her story. She refused to gossip about her colleagues and said she did not live that kind of life. In the last year of her life, despite declining health, she still was trying to find a publisher. An early version of the book, written with James Brough, is in the Cinematic Arts Library, Doheny Memorial Library, University of Southern California.

=== Nelson Eddy ===
The most significant professional and personal relationship of Jeanette MacDonald's life was with Nelson Eddy, her co-star in eight films. Their 30-year relationship was largely hidden from the public. In a handwritten 1935 letter to "Dearest Jeanette", written on his letterhead, Eddy stated: "I love you and will always be devoted to you."

During filming of Rose Marie (1936), biographer Sharon Rich reports MacDonald had her first of eight pregnancies by Eddy—before any intimate relationship with Gene Raymond, who was physically unable to father children, as she alluded to in her unfinished autobiography: "The MacRaymonds had no children."

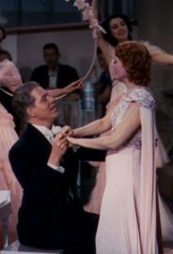
Jeanette MacDonald visibly pregnant with Nelson Eddy from the trailer for the film Sweethearts (1938)

Biographer E. J. Fleming alleged Eddy confronted Raymond for abusing the visibly pregnant MacDonald during Sweethearts (1938), ending with Eddy attacking him (reported publicly as a fall down stairs). Louis B. Mayer refused to allow annulment and elopement; MacDonald lost the baby (named Daniel Kendrick Eddy) at nearly six months, which Eddy buried in Ojai, California. All pregnancies ended in miscarriage.

Forbidden early on by Mayer to marry, they performed a handfast wedding at Lake Tahoe during Rose Marie. They considered themselves married "by God's law", renewing vows annually; MacDonald's 1948 desk diary notes "Lake Tahoe". MacDonald's autobiography includes several mentions of marital discord with Raymond, including a near-divorce in 1948.

Eddy nearly died of pneumonia in February 1946. In a semi-comatose state, he was "not expected to survive the night". A doctor summoned MacDonald so she could say her goodbyes. She sat by his bedside, holding his hand and speaking to him for two hours until he rallied. On March 26, Eddy wrote a lengthy diary entry to MacDonald about their first intimate night together after his recovery: "Never, my darling, have you been so completely my own as you were this night…never have you been so completely my wife—your arms, your lips—their magical effect on me – your whispered words—things you have never before said to me—how much I have missed you at night—how I want you always in my arms as I sleep…you and you alone are my existence." Several letters and diary entries show Eddy referring to MacDonald privately as 'my wife,' a term he continued to use until the end of her life.

In the 1930s and 1940s they privately occupied several homes: a 1938 Burbank house at 812 S. Mariposa Street; a remodeled bunkhouse at 1330 Angelo Drive, Beverly Hills; and from 1947, 710 N. Camden Drive (formerly MacDonald's mother's home). They also stayed at hotels and celebrity friends' properties, including those of Lily Pons and Irene Dunne. In 1963, MacDonald and Raymond moved into adjoining 8th-floor apartments in the East building of the Wilshire Comstock in Westwood; Eddy had a 7th-floor unit in the adjacent West building—which she decorated as their rendezvous spot—until her final illness prevented her from walking the short distance outside to visit. (Eddy's widow Ann later moved into it after Eddy's death).

Biographer Sharon Rich—who was a close friend of Blossom Rock (MacDonald's sister, an early key source who provided pictures, information, and her phone book authorizing interviews) and knew Gene Raymond—documented their affair in the biography Sweethearts, which continued (with breaks) until MacDonald's death. Rock is heard speaking and answering a question in a 1977 recording despite her stroke.

In 2015 MacDonald's papers auctioned, including the 1935 Eddy letter and her 1963 diary aligning with Rich's Sweethearts on her health and marriage.

In 2025 a letter from her secretary Emily West was made public, detailing Eddy's deep distress at MacDonald's funeral; lingering at her open casket, he looked physically unwell and near collapse. "His grief was terrible to see. It was dreadful to see him like that. He looked so utterly stricken, he was overcome and said he couldn't stay.... After a little while, Nelson went back down alone to see her." Newsreel footage shows Eddy as the last guest exiting, consoled by celebrities like Lauritz Melchior.

== Death ==
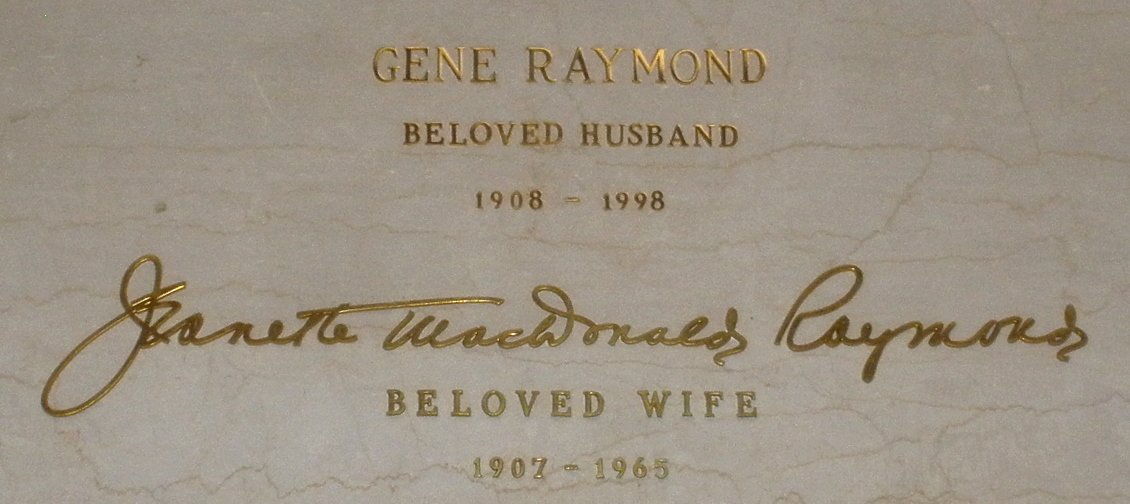
MacDonald's crypt, marked as "Jeanette MacDonald Raymond" in her handwriting. The birth year is incorrect because studios had made her appear younger. When Raymond died in 1998, his remains were placed in the same crypt with hers, with his name added.

MacDonald died at the Houston Methodist Hospital from heart failure on January 14, 1965, with Raymond by her hospital bed. Two years before, she had been assigned Dr. Michael DeBakey, who had recently operated successfully on the Duke of Windsor, in the hope that he could save her. Despite the surgery, MacDonald became ill with pleurisy the week after, and was in Houston Methodist Hospital for over a month. In December 1964, her condition worsened and she was rushed to UCLA Medical Center. DeBakey suggested open-heart surgery, and Raymond brought MacDonald into the hospital January 12. On the afternoon of the 14th, Raymond was at her bedside massaging her feet when she died. He said that their last conversation was when MacDonald said, "I love you", and he replied, "I love you too"; she then sighed deeply, and her head hit the pillow.

The funeral took place on January 18. Along with close family and widower Raymond, it was notably attended by a handful of MacDonald's costars (such as Eddy, Allan Jones, Chevalier, Joe E. Brown, Spencer Tracy, Lloyd Nolan, etc.), representatives of her fan club, former presidents Harry S. Truman and Dwight D. Eisenhower, Senator George Murphy, former vice-president Richard Nixon, future governor & president Ronald Reagan, and Mary Pickford; Dr. Gene Emmet Clark of the Church of Religious Science officiated. Newsreel footage shows Nelson Eddy as the last person to exit the church, with Lauritz Melchior and other celebrities offering him condolences. MacDonald was interred in a pink-marbled crypt at Forest Lawn Memorial Park, Glendale, which reads "Jeanette MacDonald Raymond".

== Honors and commemorations ==
For her contribution to the motion picture industry, MacDonald has a star on the Hollywood Walk of Fame at 6157 Hollywood Blvd. For her contribution to recording, MacDonald has a star on the Hollywood Walk of Fame at 1628 Vine Street.

MacDonald was crowned as the Queen of the Movies in 1939 with Tyrone Power as her king. The ceremony was filmed and presented by Ed Sullivan.

MacDonald was awarded an honorary doctor of music degree from Ithaca College in 1956.

MacDonald was named Philadelphia's Woman of the Year in 1961. Of the award, she said, "It is strange how awards, decorations, doctorates, etc., can be conferred from various parts of the country, and even the world. And yet, the funny satisfaction of being recognized in one's home town seems to be a more gratifying recognition than all."

=== Posthumous ===
Shortly after MacDonald's death, surviving classmates from her high school contributed a $150 donation in her name to the Children's Heart Hospital of Philadelphia.

The USC Thornton School of Music built a Jeanette MacDonald Recital Hall in her honor.

A bronze plaque for MacDonald was unveiled in March 1988 on the Philadelphia Music Alliance's Walk of Fame in Raymond's presence.

== Credits ==
=== Discography ===
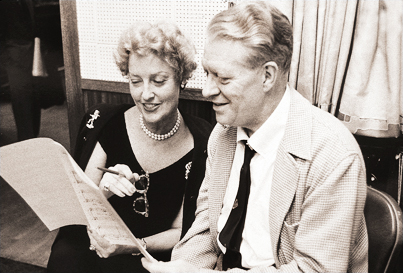
MacDonald and Nelson Eddy in the recording studio proofreading music sheets for Favorites in Stereo (c. 1956 – c. 1958)

MacDonald performed and recorded more than 50 songs during her career, working exclusively for RCA Victor in the United States. She also did some early recordings for His Master's Voice in England and France while she was there on a concert tour in 1931. She earned three gold records, one for the LP album, Favorites in Stereo that she did with Nelson Eddy in 1959.

- MacDonald in Song (1939)
- Religious Songs (1945)
- Operetta Favorites (1946)
- Romantic Moments (1950)
- Favorites (c. 1951)
- Favorites in Stereo (1959)
- Smilin' Through (1960)
- Jeanette MacDonald Sings Songs of Faith and Inspiration (1963)

==== Concerts ====
Date	Location	Set list	Notes	Ref
August 10, 1943	Emil Blatz Temple of Music, Milwaukee	"Le Roi de Thulé", "The Jewel Song", "The Waltz Song", "Les Filles de Cadiz", and "Badinage"	Performed with the Music Under the Stars Symphony Orchestra, conducted by Jerzy Bojanowski	
August 9, 1945	The Hollywood Bowl		Performed with the Hollywood Bowl Symphony Orchestra, conducted by Leopold Stokowski	
August 18, 1948	The Hollywood Bowl		Performed with the Hollywood Bowl Symphony Orchestra, conducted by Eugene Ormandy	
January 13, 1949	War Memorial Opera House		Performed with the San Francisco Symphony Orchestra, conducted by Pierre Monteux	
July 27, 1950	Robin Hood Dell		Performed with the Philadelphia Orchestra, conducted by Vladimir Golschmann	
July 19, 1951	Lewisohn Stadium		Performed with the Stadium Concerts Symphony Orchestra, conducted by Alexander Smallens	
July 26, 1952	Robin Hood Dell		Performed with the Philadelphia Orchestra, conducted by Erich Leinsdorf	
July 2, 1954	Red Rocks Theater		Performed with the Denver Symphony Orchestra, conducted by Saul Caston	
July 16, 1957	Emil Blatz Temple of Music, Milwaukee		Performed with the Music Under the Stars Orchestra, conducted by John Anello	

==== Tours ====
Title	Location(s)	Opening date	Closing date	Selected set list	Notes	Ref.
Jeanette MacDonald, en personne	Empire Theatre, Paris (France)	September 4, 1931	c. September 18, 1931 (Note: Two weeks later)	"Dream Lover" (Schertzinger/Grey), "Un Jour" (Friml), "Beyond the Blue Horizon" (Whiting/Harling/Robin), "Riveiens" (Fragson), "Marche des Grenadiers" (Schertzinger)		
Jeanette MacDonald, In Person	Dominion Theatre, London (England)	September 21, 1931	c. October 5, 1931	"Dream Lover" (Schertzinger/Grey), "Un Jour" ("Some Day"; Friml), "Beyond the Blue Horizon" (Whiting/Harling/Robin), "Riveiens" (Fragson), "Marche des Grenadiers" (Schertzinger)		
Jeanette MacDonald, dans une creation scenique	(Rex Theatre) Paris, Lille, Lyon, Marseille, Strasbourg, Amsterdam, Rotterdam, Brussels, Geneva, and Lausanne	February 3, 1933	n/a	"Aimez-moi ce soir", "Reviens", "Parlez-moi d'amour", "N'est-ce pas poétique?", "Le Chanson de Vilia", "J'aime d'amour", "Marche des Grenadiers"	This was a mixture of a concert and a stage play, which was entirely in French; Also featured The New Wayburn Rhythm Dancers, The Rex Appeal Girls, and The Mangan-Tillerex Dancers	
Jeanette MacDonald in Recital	Kansas State Teachers College of Pittsburg and 20 other cities (USA)	March 16, 1939	n/a	"Lehn' Deine Wang an Meine Wang" (A. Jensen), "Ich Liebe Dich" (E. Grieg), "My Old Kentucky Home" (S. Foster), "Comin' Thro the Rye" (G. H. Clutsam), "The Jewel Song" (from Faust), "Sempre Libera" (G. Verdi), "J'ai pleuré en rêve" (G. Hüe), "From the Land of the Sky-Blue Water" (C. W. Cadman), "Daddy's Sweetheart" (L. Lehmann), and "When I Have Sung My Songs" (E. Charles)		
Jeanette MacDonald in Recital	30 cities (USA)	Spring 1940		" "		
Jeanette MacDonald in Recital	11 cities (USA)	Fall 1940		" "		
Jeanette MacDonald in Recital	13 cities (USA)	Winter 1941		" "		
Jeanette MacDonald in Recital	14 cities (USA)	Fall 1942		" "	For the Army Emergency Relief fund	
Jeanette MacDonald in Recital	7 cities (USA)	Summer 1943		" "		
Jeanette MacDonald in Recital	20 cities (USA)	Fall 1943		" "		
Jeanette MacDonald in Recital	14 cities (USA)	Spring 1944		" "		
Jeanette MacDonald in Recital	20 cities (USA)	Fall 1944		" "		
Jeanette MacDonald in Recital	17 cities (USA)	Fall 1945		" "		
Jeanette MacDonald in Recital	England, Scotland and Wales (7 cities)	Summer 1946		" "	It was roughly at this point when other songs were included in the concerts, such as "Oh, Charlie Is My Darling", "Beau Soir", "The Last Rose of Summer", "Down in the Glen", and "Ah! non credea mirarti"	
Jeanette MacDonald in Recital	18 cities (USA)	Spring 1948		" "	" "	
Jeanette MacDonald in Recital (US Air Force Holiday Variety Show)	16 cities (Western Europe)	Late 1949	Early 1950	" "	""	
Jeanette MacDonald in Recital	13 cities (USA)	Spring 1950		" "	" "	
Jeanette MacDonald in Recital	7 cities (USA)	Fall 1950		" "		
Jeanette MacDonald in Recital	14 cities (USA and Canada)	Fall 1952		" "		
Jeanette MacDonald at The Sahara	The Sahara Hotel, Las Vegas	March 10, 1953	n/a		Supporting acts: Mickey Sharp (comic), Yvonne Moray (singer), and The Harem Dancers	
The First Lady of Song, Jeanette MacDonald	Sands Hotel, Las Vegas	October 28, 1953	n/a (Note: Three weeks later)	"There's No Business Like Show Business", "Ouvre ton coueur", "Indian Love Call", "Giannina Mia", "Chansonette", "The Donkey Serenade", "Ebb Tide", and "Un bel di".	Supporting acts: The Nicholas Brothers, comic Eddie Garson, and The Girls of the Sands; MacDonald also danced with Bill Alcorn and Jack Mattis	
The First Lady of Song, Jeanette MacDonald	Cocoanut Grove, Ambassador Hotel (Los Angeles)	January 20, 1954	n/a	"There's No Business Like Show Business", "Ouvre ton coueur", "Indian Love Call", "April in Paris"/"I Love Paris"/C'est Magnifique" (medley), "Chansonette", "The Donkey Serenade", "Ebb Tide", and "Un bel di".	" "	
