= MacDonald in Song =

1939 studio album by Jeanette MacDonald

Studio album by Jeanette MacDonald
- Released: 1939
- Recorded: September 11–16, 1939
- Studio: Hollywood Recording Studio, Los Angeles
- Genre: Popular music
- Label: RCA Victor
- Producer: Giuseppe Bamboschek (conductor)

Jeanette MacDonald chronology
MacDonald in Song (1939)	Religious Songs (1945)

MacDonald in Song (sometimes referred to as Jeanette MacDonald in Song) is a 1939 album by American actress Jeanette MacDonald, released by RCA Victor.

== Background ==
Jeanette MacDonald had appeared in Hollywood musical movies throughout the 1930s and was one of the most popular American artists in the world. She had toured France and England in 1931 and 1933, and would tour the United States in 1939, starting from March. The album was recorded later that year between September 11 and 16 at the Hollywood Recording Studio in Los Angeles with an orchestra, conducted by Giuseppe Bamboschek. Bamboschek performed the piano on four tracks, as well as MacDonald's husband Gene Raymond (whose two tracks were not released).

The album was released with four 10-inch discs.

== Track listing ==
Ten songs feature on the track, despite 17 songs being recorded (Note: Two ("One Kiss" and "Lover, Come Back to Me") were recorded in time for MacDonald's appearance in New Moon.) (some were additional takes) during the session.

No.	Title	Lyrics	Music	Length
1.	"When I Have Sung My Songs"	Ernest Charles	Ernest Charles	02:13
2.	"Do Not Go, My Love"	Richard Hageman	Richard Hageman	03:02
3.	"Annie Laurie"	Alicia Scott, William Douglas	Alicia Scott
4.	"Comin' Thro' the Rye (Old Scotch Air)"	Robert Burns	Robert Burns
5.	"From The Land Of The Sky-Blue Water"	Nelle Richmond Eberhart	Charles Wakefield Cadman
6.	"Let Me Always Sing"	Gene Raymond	Gene Raymond
7.	"Ave Maria"	Charles Gounod	Bach
8.	"Les Filles De Cadiz"	Alfred de Musset	Léo Delibes
9.	"Il Était Un Roi De Thulé"	Charles Gounod	Charles Gounod	03:43
10.	"Air De Bijoux"	Jules Barbier and Michel Carré	Charles Gounod	04:04

== Reception ==
MacDonald in Song received mixed reviews: Baltimore's The Evening Sun noted the "[s]loppy diction, a shallow, edgy voice quality and a banal lack of contrast in songs of varying mood[,]" and that "The red-haired soprano's film following will probably find these records pleasantly entertaining, but the regular concert record purchaser will not." D. S. Steinfirst ended his review with "Surprisingly enough, the Faust arias are above the average" after writing "Most of the singing is undistinguished." However, The Evening Sun dubbed "Ave Maria" the best track, which J. D. Callaghan agreed with, adding "although Miss MacDonald also is effective in two arias from the opera Faust."

== Bibliography ==
- Turk, Edward Baron (1998). Hollywood Diva: A Biography of Jeanette MacDonald. Los Angeles: University of California Press. ISBN 978-0-520-22253-3.
