= Oh, Charlie Is My Darling =

"Oh, Charlie is My Darling"

Song
- Published: 1927
- Songwriter(s): Irving Bibo

Oh, Charlie is My Darling is a song by Irving Bibo from 1927 and was published by Bibo, Boedon & Lang.
