= Herbert Stothart =

American songwriter, arranger, conductor and composer (1885–1949)

- Born: Herbert Pope Stothart; September 11, 1885; Milwaukee, Wisconsin, U.S.
- Died: February 1, 1949 (aged 63); Los Angeles, California, U.S.
- Resting place: Forest Lawn Memorial Park (Glendale)
- Spouse: Mary Wolfe
- Children: 3
- Awards: Best Original Score; 1939 The Wizard of Oz

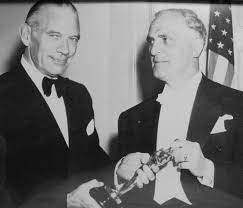
Herbert Stothart (right) receiving the Academy Award for the Wizard of Oz.

Herbert Pope Stothart (September 11, 1885 – February 1, 1949) was an American songwriter, arranger, conductor, and composer. He was nominated for ten Academy Awards and won Best Original Score for The Wizard of Oz. Stothart was widely acknowledged as a prominent member of the top tier of Hollywood composers during the 1930s and 1940s.

== Life and career ==
Herbert Stothart was born in Milwaukee, Wisconsin. He studied music in Europe and at the University of Wisconsin–Madison, where he later taught.

Stothart was initially hired by producer Arthur Hammerstein to serve as a musical director for touring companies of Broadway shows. He soon began composing music for Oscar Hammerstein II, the producer's nephew. Notably, Stothart composed music for the famous operetta, Rose-Marie. He collaborated with renowned composers such as Vincent Youmans, George Gershwin and Franz Lehár. Stothart achieved success on the pop charts with standards like "Cute Little Two by Four", "Wildflower", "Bambalina", "The Mounties", "Totem Tom-Tom", "Why Shouldn't We?", "Fly Away", "Song of the Flame", "The Cossack Love Song", "Dawn", "I Wanna Be Loved by You", "Cuban Love Song", "The Rogue Song" and "The Donkey Serenade".

The year 1929 marked the final year of silent films, the end of the era. Shortly after completing his latest musical, Golden Dawn, with Emmerich Kálmán, Oscar Hammerstein, and Otto Harbach, Stothart received an invitation from Louis B. Mayer to move to Hollywood, an invitation which he accepted. In 1929, Stothart signed a substantial contract with MGM.

The next twenty years of his life were spent at MGM Studios, where he was part of elite group of Hollywood composers. Among the many films he worked on was the famous 1936 version of Rose-Marie, starring Jeanette MacDonald and Nelson Eddy. He conducted and composed songs and scores for films such as The Cuban Love Song, The Good Earth, Romeo and Juliet, Mutiny on the Bounty, Mrs. Miniver, The Green Years and The Picture of Dorian Gray. His notable contributions also include the Marx Brothers' Night at the Opera, the romantic drama Anna Karenina based on Leo Tolstoy's novel, and two Charles Dickens adaptations (A Tale of Two Cities and David Copperfield). He ultimately won an Oscar for his musical score in the 1939 film The Wizard of Oz.

Herbert Stothart dedicated his entire Hollywood career to MGM. In 1947, while visiting Scotland, he suffered a heart attack. Afterward, he composed an orchestral piece titled Heart Attack: A Symphonic Poem, inspired by his personal tribulations. Additionally, he worked on another composition, Voices of Liberation, commissioned by the Roger Wagner Chorale. Stothart died two years later at the age of 63.

== Awards ==
=== Academy Awards ===
Two of Stothart’s scores, Mutiny on the Bounty and Maytime, were also nominated. Prior to 1938 nominations in the scoring category went to the heads of studio music departments regardless of the credited composer.

Year	Film	Category	Result
1938	Marie Antoinette	Best Music (Original Score)	Nominated
1938	Sweethearts	Best Music (Scoring)	Nominated
1939	The Wizard of Oz	Best Music (Original Score)	Won
1940	Waterloo Bridge	Best Music (Original Score)	Nominated
1941	The Chocolate Soldier	Best Music (Scoring of a Musical Picture)	Nominated
1942	Random Harvest	Best Music (Score of a Dramatic or Comedy Picture)	Nominated
1943	Madame Curie	Best Music (Score of Dramatic or Comedy Picture)	Nominated
1943	Thousands Cheer	Best Music (Scoring of a Musical Picture)	Nominated
1944	Kismet	Best Music (Score of a Dramatic or Comedy Picture)	Nominated
1945	The Valley of Decision	Best Music (Score of a Dramatic or Comedy Picture)	Nominated

== Works ==
Herbert Stothart produced over 100 film scores including:

1. Devil-May-Care (1929)
2. Rasputin and the Empress (1932)
3. Queen Christina (1933)
4. The Barretts of Wimpole Street (1934)
5. What Every Woman Knows (1934)
6. Anna Karenina (1935)
7. China Seas (1935)
8. David Copperfield (1935 version)
9. Mutiny on the Bounty (1935)
10. Naughty Marietta (musical score only; the songs were by Victor Herbert, Rida Johnson Young, and Gus Kahn) (1935)
11. A Night at the Opera (1935, which also used music by Giuseppe Verdi, Ruggero Leoncavallo, and Nacio Herb Brown, with some lyrics by Arthur Freed)
12. A Tale of Two Cities (1935)
13. After the Thin Man (1936)
14. Camille (1936) (additional uncredited music by Edward Ward)
15. The Good Earth (1937)
16. Maytime (1937)
17. Marie Antoinette (1938)
18. Of Human Hearts (1938)
19. Sweethearts (1938)
20. Idiot's Delight (1939)
21. The Wizard of Oz (Oscar: Best Original Score; songs by E.Y. Harburg and Harold Arlen) (1939)
22. Balalaika (1939)
23. Northwest Passage (1940 film by King Vidor)
24. Edison, the Man (1940)
25. Waterloo Bridge (1940)
26. Susan and God (1940)
27. New Moon (1940)
28. Pride and Prejudice (1940 version)
29. Bitter Sweet (1940)
30. Come Live With Me (1941)
31. Men of Boys Town (1941)
32. Ziegfeld Girl (1941)
33. Blossoms in the Dust (additional uncredited music by Daniele Amfitheatrof) (1941)
34. The Chocolate Soldier (additional music adapted by Bronislau Kaper)(1941)
35. Mrs. Miniver (additional uncredited music by Daniele Amfitheatrof) (1942)
36. I Married An Angel (1942)
37. Random Harvest (1942)
38. The Human Comedy (1943)
39. A Guy Named Joe (1943) (additional music by Alberto Colombo)
40. Madame Curie (1943)
41. Thousands Cheer (1943)
42. National Velvet (1944)
43. Thirty Seconds Over Tokyo (1944)
44. Dragon Seed (1944)
45. Kismet (1944)
46. The White Cliffs of Dover (1944)
47. The Picture of Dorian Gray (additional uncredited music by Mario Castelnuovo-Tedesco) (1945)
48. Adventure (1945)
49. They Were Expendable (1945 World War II film by John Ford) (1945)
50. The Valley of Decision (1945)
51. Undercurrent (1946) (additional uncredited music by Mario Castelnuovo-Tedesco)
52. The Green Years (1946)
53. The Yearling (arrangement of Frederick Delius's music) (1946)
54. The Sea of Grass (1947)
55. If Winter Comes (1947)
56. Desire Me (1947)
57. The Three Musketeers (1948)
58. Three Daring Daughters (additional uncredited music by Lothar Perl) (1948)
59. Big Jack (1949) (final score produced and released posthumously)

== Famous Songs ==
"The Donkey Serenade": Adapted from a melody by Rudolf Friml and featuring lyrics by Robert Wright and George Forrest, this song became well-known from the 1937 film version of The Firefly.

"Wildflower": (1923): A successful Broadway hit where Stothart collaborated with Vincent Youmans and Hammerstein-Harbach.

"Rose Marie": (1924): An extremely successful show written by Rudolf Friml, contributing to Stothart's career momentum.

"The Rogue Song": Featured in the 1930 film of the same name.

"Cuban Love Song": A hit from the 1931 film The Cuban Love Song.

"I Wanna Be Loved By You": Helen Kane first performed the song in 1928 and included a "Boop-Boop-a-Doop" tag that inspired the cartoon character Betty Boop. Marilyn Monroe famously performed the song in the 1959 comedy film Some Like It Hot.

== Death ==
Herbert Stothart died of cancer in Los Angeles, California at the age of 63. He is interred at Glendale's Forest Lawn Memorial Park Cemetery.
