= Beau soir =

1891 song composed by Claude Debussy with lyrics by Paul Bourget

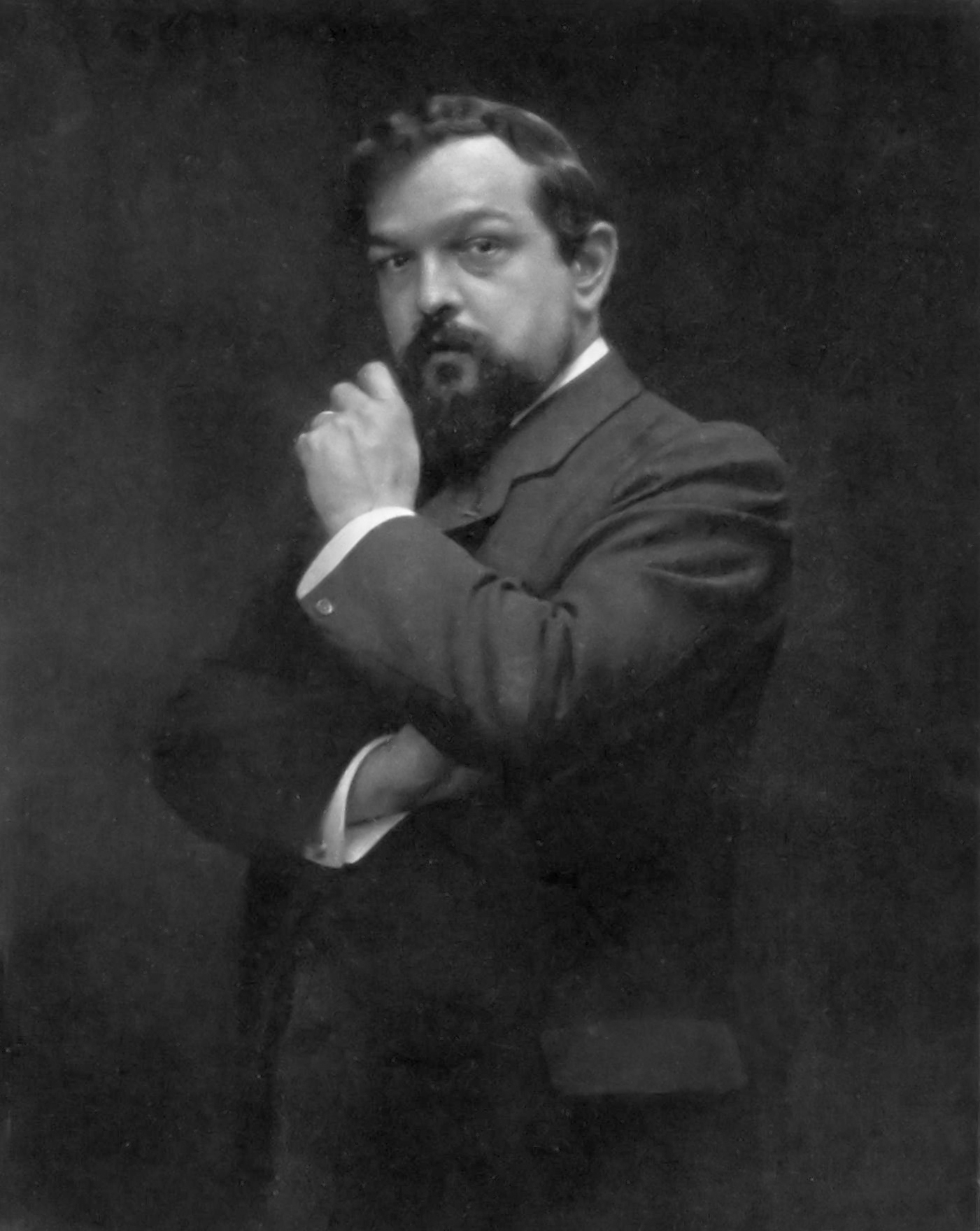
Claude Debussy in 1900

"Beau soir" (French for Beautiful Evening, or Evening Fair), L. 84, is a French art song written by Claude Debussy, first published in 1891. It is a setting of a poem by Paul Bourget.

== Description ==
"Beau soir" ("Beautiful Evening") is set to a poem by Paul Bourget. The poem paints the picture of a beautiful evening where the rivers are turned rose-colored by the sunset and the wheat fields are moved by a warm breeze. Debussy uses a gently flowing triplet rhythm in the accompaniment, which contrasts the duplets that drive the light melody. The piano and voice partner to create the sensation of peace that one might feel in the evening in nature, fitting the post-Romantic style. As any evening fades, however, so does the mood of the piece, and the song modulates from E major to F♯ minor. The piece reaches its climax when the melody reaches a high F♯, paired with the word "beau", about two-thirds through the piece, before entering its modulated conclusion.

== Lyrics ==
"Beau soir"
Performed Giuseppe De Luca

Lorsque au soleil couchant les rivières sont roses
Et qu'un tiède frisson court sur les champs de blé,
Un conseil d'être heureux semble sortir des choses
Et monter vers le cœur troublé.

Un conseil de goûter le charme d'être au monde
Cependant qu'on est jeune et que le soir est beau,
Car nous nous en allons, comme s'en va cette onde :
Elle à la mer, nous au tombeau.

== Recordings ==
"Beau soir"
Instrumental (cello and piano)

"Beau soir" has been recorded by many singers, including Barbra Streisand (on her album Classical Barbra), Maggie Teyte, Véronique Gens, Giuseppe De Luca, Dietrich Fischer-Dieskau, Renée Fleming, Jessye Norman (last track on the album An Evening With Jessye Norman), and Diana Damrau.

It has also been arranged for various instruments, including for violin and orchestra by Jascha Heifetz and cello and piano by Julian Lloyd Webber.
