= Rose Marie (1936 film) =

1936 film by W. S. Van Dyke

- Film poster
- Directed by: W. S. Van Dyke
- Screenplay by: Frances Goodrich; Albert Hackett
- Based on: Rose-Marie; 1924 operetta by: Otto Harbach; Oscar Hammerstein II
- Produced by: Hunt Stromberg
- Starring: Jeanette MacDonald; Nelson Eddy; Reginald Owen; Allan Jones; James Stewart; Alan Mowbray; Gilda Gray
- Cinematography: William H. Daniels
- Edited by: Blanche Sewell
- Music by: Rudolf Friml; Herbert Stothart
- Production company: Metro-Goldwyn-Mayer
- Distributed by: Loew's Inc.
- Release date: January 28, 1936
- Running time: 102 minutes
- Country: United States
- Language: English
- Budget: $875,000
- Box office: $3,515,000

Rose Marie is a 1936 American musical directed by W. S. Van Dyke and starring Jeanette MacDonald, Nelson Eddy and Reginald Owen. It was the third highest grossing international film of 1936. It is the second of three Metro-Goldwyn-Mayer film adaptations of the 1924 Broadway musical of the same name. A silent version was released in 1928 and a color film in 1954. All three versions are set in the Canadian wilderness. Portions of Rudolf Friml and Herbert Stothart's original score for the Broadway musical are included in both the 1936 and 1954 films.

Although the stage version's original plot was changed and most of its songs were omitted, the 1936 film was a great success and became perhaps MacDonald's and Eddy's best-known film. Their duet "Indian Love Call" was a major hit and remained a signature song throughout their careers.

== Plot ==
Marie de Flor is a Canadian soprano performing in Roméo et Juliette in Montreal with the premier of Quebec in the audience. Inviting the premier and his entourage to dinner after the performance, she learns from a man named Boniface that her brother Jack, supposedly in prison for armed robbery, was wounded as he escaped from prison and has killed a Mountie in the process. She departs for the Canadian wilderness with Boniface, hoping to help Jack. At the same time, Sergeant Bruce of the Mounties reports to headquarters and receives his latest mission: he must find Jack Flower, believed to be hiding near Lake Chibougam.

Marie and Boniface reach an outpost near Lake Chibougam, where Boniface disappears with Marie's money. Marie falls in with Sergeant Bruce, but Marie cannot tell him the truth for fear of compromising Jack. Marie sings at a local cafe to earn some money but fails to attract any tips.

Bruce insists that Marie report Boniface's theft, but she cannot admit her real identity, calling herself Rose. However, Bruce has recognized her via her voice. They travel together to an Indian ceremony that night. Bruce, despite his strong sense of duty, proves to be a womanizer, and they sing together. Marie finds Boniface and they leave together. However, Bruce has discovered that she is really Jack's sister and pursues her, knowing that she will lead him to Jack.

Boniface and Marie travel on horseback to Hayman's Landing, where Jack is hiding. Sergeant Bruce, who has been following her, rescues her from drowning as they cross a deep river, and Boniface flees to the forest.

Marie haughtily refuses the Sergeant's help but realizes that she will not reach Jack without his help. She and the sergeant travel together for the next three days before she leaves him with a new guide.

Marie finds Jack being nursed by Boniface's mother and tries to persuade him to reform. She gives him money to escape and begin a new life, but Bruce appears and arrests Jack. Marie pleads with the sergeant to release Jack, but he refuses.

No more is heard of Jack, but Marie, although unwell, returns to opera performance. She performs the title role in the opera Tosca. She imagines that she hears "Indian Love Call" throughout the opera and collapses on the stage just before the final curtain. She retires to a mountain lodge and refuses to sing for six months. Her manager Myerson visits and expresses his disappointment that she will not sing again. After he leaves, she begins singing "Indian Love Call". Myerson urges Sergeant Bruce, who has been waiting in the foyer, to join her, and they sing together.

== Cast ==
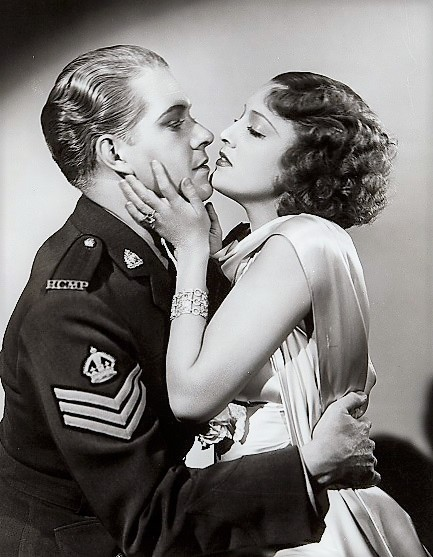
Nelson Eddy and Jeanette MacDonald in a still for the film by Russell Ball

- Jeanette MacDonald as Marie de Flor
- Nelson Eddy as Sergeant Bruce
- Reginald Owen as Myerson
- Allan Jones as Romèo and Mario Cavaradossi (opera scenes)
- James Stewart as Jack Flower
- Alan Mowbray as Premier of Quebec
- George Regas as Boniface
- Una O'Connor as Anna
- Robert Greig as Saloon and Hotel Owner
- James Conlin as Joe, the pianist
- Gilda Gray as Belle
- David Niven as Teddy (as David Nivens)
- Herman Bing as Mr. Daniells

An extra in the film named Robert Barr Miller, who appears in the credits under his real name, was sought by authorities for robbery and murder in northern California.

== Songs ==
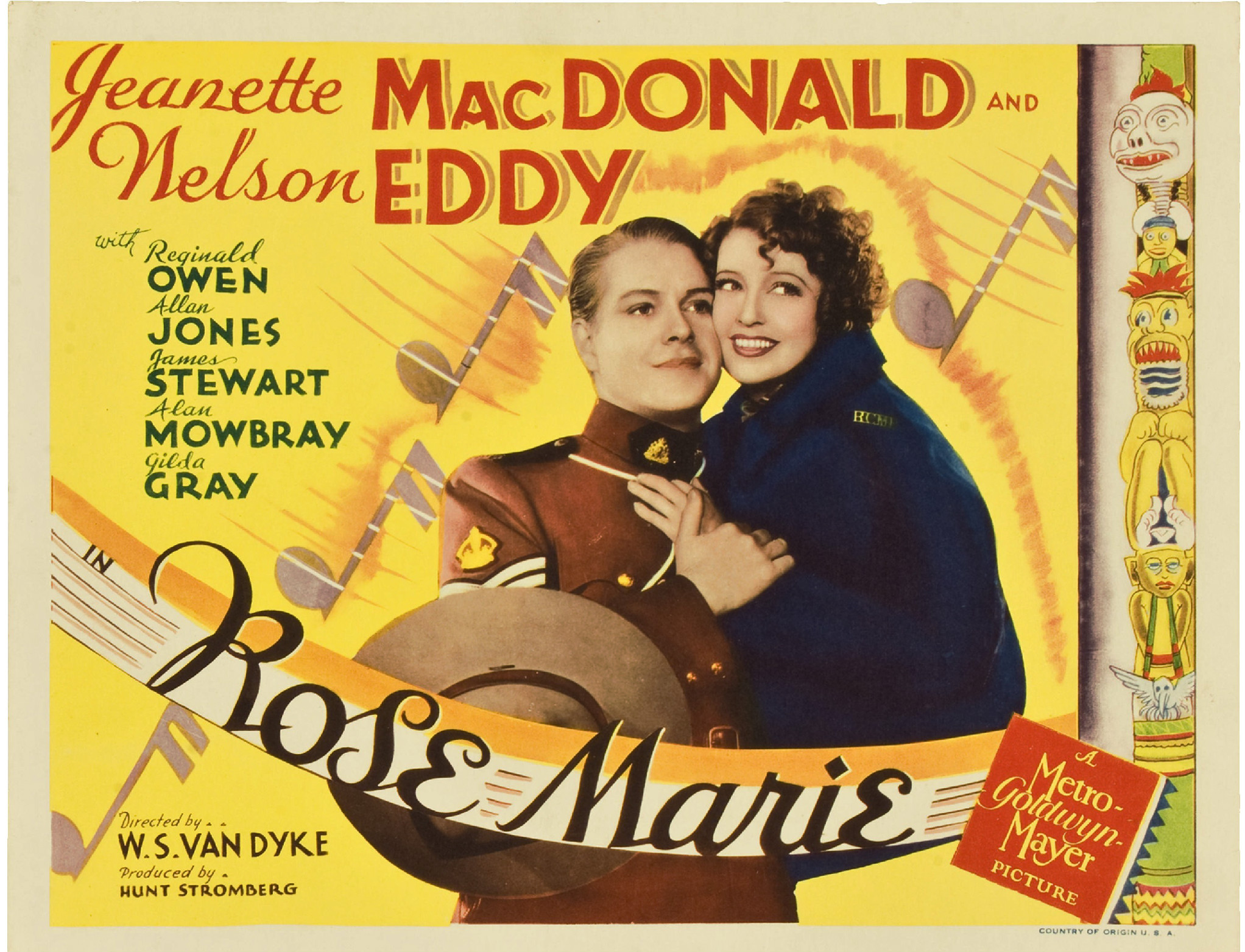
Lobby card

- Overture: "Indian Love Call" and "Rose Marie"
- Scenes from Roméo et Juliette (music by Charles Gounod, libretto by Jules Barbier and Michel Carré)
- "Pardon Me, Madame"
- "The Mounties"
- "Dinah" (music by Harry Akst, lyrics by Sam Lewis and Joe Young)
- "Some of These Days" (Shelton Brooks)
- "Rose Marie"
- "Totem Tom-Tom"
- "Just for You"
- "Three Blind Mice"
- "Indian Love Call" (sung four times)
- Act III of Tosca, from Tosca's entrance (music by Giacomo Puccini, libretto by Giuseppe Giacosa and Luigi Illica)
- "Indian Love Call (Reprise)"

== Production ==
While footage of the Mounties in boot camp was filmed in Canada, location filming with the lead actors occurred at Lake Tahoe. The film was originally slated to be in color, but makeup man Fred Phillips explained that when it was decided to film in black and white, the studio ordered him to change Eddy's makeup in a negative fashion. Phillips stated that orders were sent by Louis B. Mayer, who was angry at Eddy for his personal involvement in MacDonald's life.

== Reception ==
Rose Marie grossed a worldwide total of $3,515,000 ($1,695,000 in the US & Canada, and $1,820,000 internationally). It made a profit of $820,000.

In a contemporary review for The New York Times, critic Frank S. Nugent called Rose Marie "[a]s blithely melodious and rich in scenic beauty as any picture that has come from Hollywood" and wrote: "... Jeanette MacDonald and Nelson Eddy sing an operetta's love songs and we care not who may write its book. In splendid voice, whether singing solo or in duet, they prove to be fully as delightful a combination here as they were in the film of Victor Herbert's Naughty Marietta, which was so welcome a contribution to last year's film calendar."

The film is recognized by American Film Institute in these lists:

- 2002: AFI's 100 Years...100 Passions – Nominated
- 2004: AFI's 100 Years...100 Songs:
  - "Indian Love Call" – Nominated

== See also ==
- List of American films of 1936
