= New Moon (1940 film) =

1940 film by Robert Zigler Leonard, W. S. Van Dyke

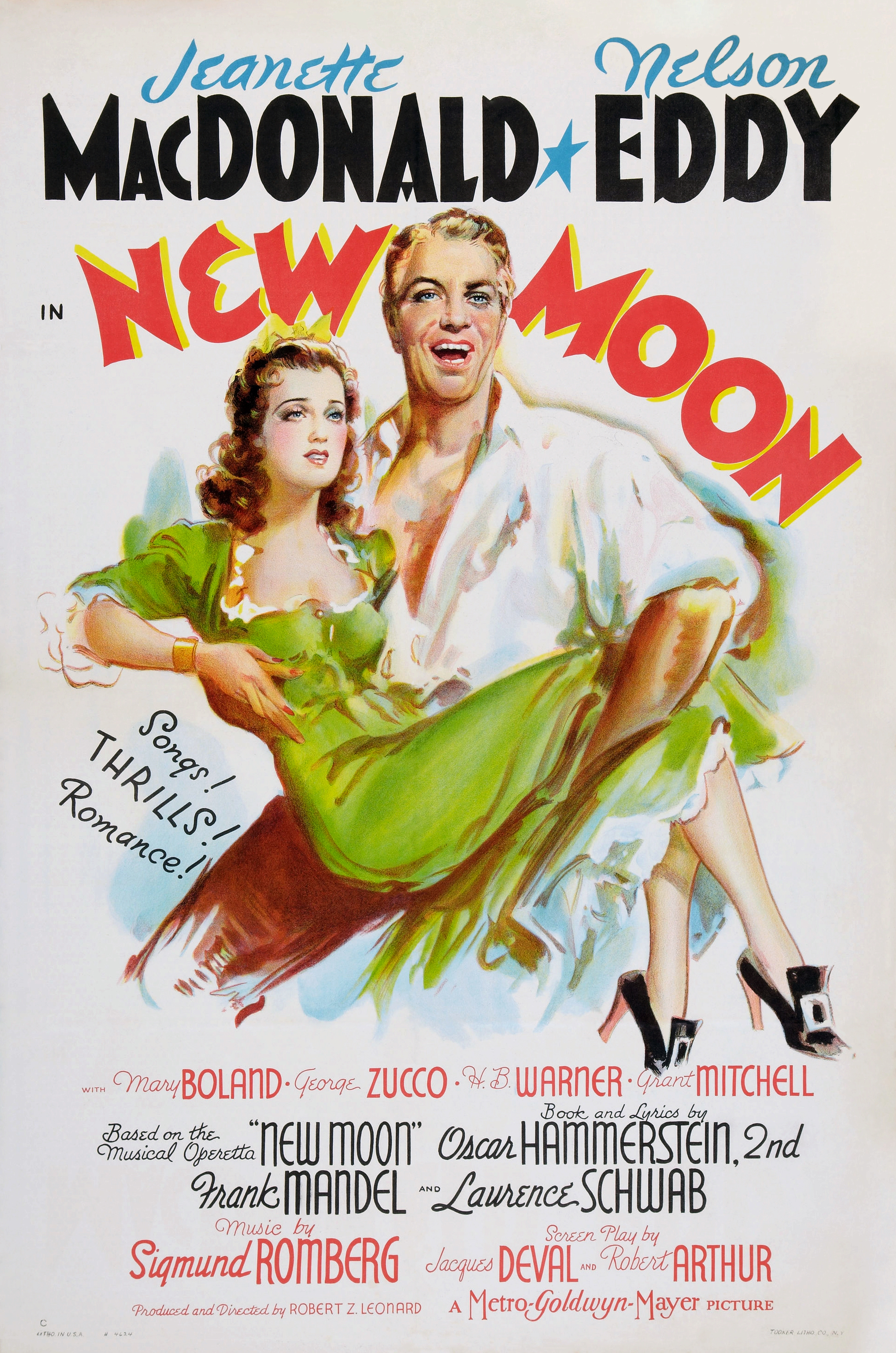
- Theatrical release poster
- Directed by: Robert Z. Leonard; W. S. Van Dyke
- Written by: Robert Arthur; Jacques Deval
- Based on: The New Moon; 1928 operetta by Sigmund Romberg; Oscar Hammerstein II
- Produced by: Robert Z. Leonard
- Starring: Jeanette MacDonald; Nelson Eddy; Mary Boland; George Zucco
- Cinematography: William H. Daniels
- Edited by: Harold F. Kress
- Music by: Herbert Stothart
- Production company: Metro-Goldwyn-Mayer
- Distributed by: Loew's Inc.
- Release dates: June 28, 1940 (world premiere); July 19, 1940 (New York City)
- Running time: 105 minutes
- Country: United States
- Language: English
- Budget: $1,487,000
- Box office: $1,290,000 (domestic earnings) $1,237,000 (foreign earnings)

New Moon is a 1940 American musical film released by Metro-Goldwyn-Mayer and directed by Robert Z. Leonard, with uncredited direction by W. S. Van Dyke.

It is the second film adaptation of the operetta The New Moon, which premiered on Broadway in 1928. The stage version featured music by Sigmund Romberg and book and lyrics by Oscar Hammerstein II and others. The first film adaptation, also titled New Moon, which premiered in 1930, was less faithful to the stage version.

== Plot ==
During the 18th century in New Orleans, Louisiana, a French nobleman in disguise as a bondsman, Charles leads his fellow bondsmen in revolt against his ship's captain, commandeering the ship and heading out to sea.

== Cast ==
- Jeanette MacDonald as Marianne de Beaumanoir
- Nelson Eddy as Charles (Henri), Duc de Villiers
- Mary Boland as Valerie de Rossac
- George Zucco as Vicomte Ribaud
- H. B. Warner as Father Michel
- Grant Mitchell as Governor of New Orleans
- Stanley Fields as Tambour
- Dick Purcell as Alexander
- John Miljan as Pierre Brugnon
- Ivan F. Simpson as Guizot
- William Tannen as Pierre
- Cecil Cunningham as Governor's Wife
- Joe Yule as Maurice
- Ray Walker as Coco
- George Irving as Ship's Captain
- Edwin Maxwell as Captain de Jean
- Robert Warwick as Commissar
- Claude King as Monsieur Dubois
- Buster Keaton as Prisoner Lulu (uncredited)

== Reception ==
The film was included in the 1978 book, The Fifty Worst Films of All Time (and How They Got That Way), by Harry Medved, Randy Dreyfuss, and Michael Medved.
