= The Firefly (operetta) =

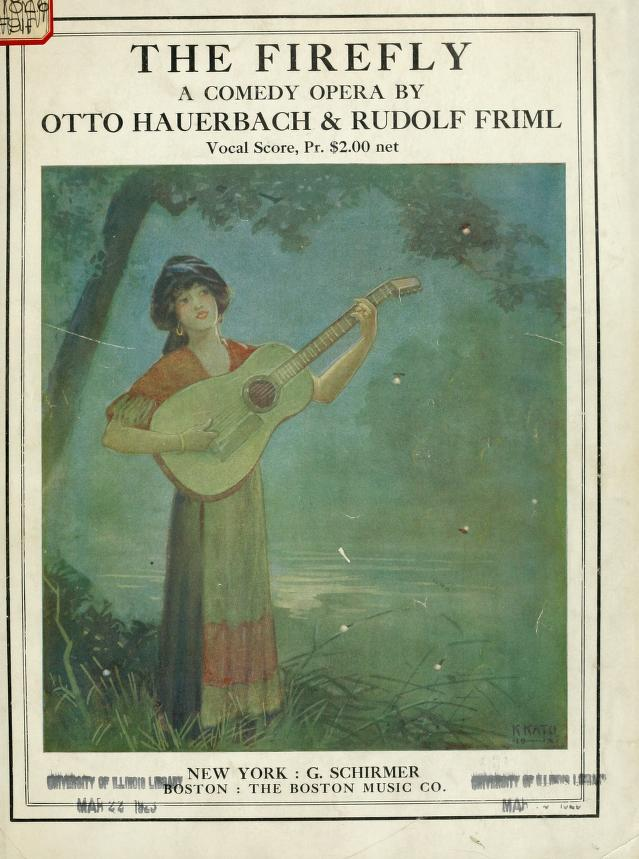
- Frontispiece of vocal score
- Music: Rudolf Friml
- Lyrics: Otto Harbach
- Book: Otto Harbach
- Productions: 1912 Broadway; 1931 Broadway

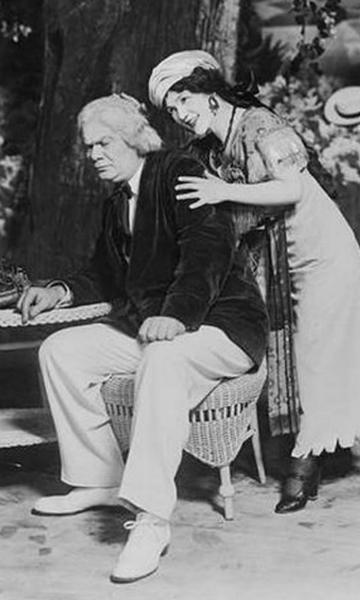
Henry Vogel and Emma Trentini in The Firefly (1912)

The Firefly was the first operetta written by composer Rudolf Friml, with a libretto by Otto Harbach. The story concerns a young Italian girl, who is a street singer in New York. She disguises herself and serves as a cabin boy on a ship to Bermuda, where she falls in love. Complications arise, and eventually, she becomes a grand opera diva.

After tryouts at the Empire Theatre in Syracuse, New York beginning in October 1912, the operetta premiered on Broadway on December 2, 1912 at the Lyric Theatre, transferring after Christmas to the Casino Theatre. It was warmly received and ran for an encouraging 120 performances. The piece became one of the more frequently revived Friml works but was not given a complete recording until 2006. A 1937 MGM film version used most of the songs but had a new plot set in Spain during the time of Napoleon. It starred Jeanette MacDonald and Allan Jones.

== Roles ==
Role (in order of appearance)	Voice Type	Original Broadway cast
Captain	tenor	
Sybil Van Dare	soprano	Vera De Rosa
Suzette (Geraldine's maid)	soprano	Ruby Norton
Pietro (Thurston's valet)		Sammy Lee
Mrs. Oglesby Van Dare (Sybil's mother)		Katherine Stewart
Jenkins (confidential secretary)		Roy Atwell
Geraldine Van Dare (Mrs. Van Dare's niece)	soprano	Audrey Maple
Jack Travers (Geraldine's sweetheart)	tenor	Craig Campbell
John Thurston (Jack's uncle)	baritone	Melville Stewart
Herr Franz (Choirmaster)		Henry Vogel
Antonio Columbo (Pick pocket)		Irene Cassini
Correlli (Nina's Guardian)		George Williams
Nina (a street singer)	soprano or mezzo-soprano	Emma Trentini
Chorus of sailors, guests, etc.

== Background and productions ==
One of the most popular theatrical forms in the early decades of the 20th century in America was the operetta, and its most famous composer was Irish-born Victor Herbert. It was announced in 1912 that Italian-born operetta diva Emma Trentini would be starring on Broadway in a new operetta by Herbert with lyricist Otto Harbach entitled The Firefly. Shortly before the writing of the operetta, Trentini appeared in a special performance of Herbert's Naughty Marietta conducted by Herbert himself. When Trentini refused to sing "Italian Street Song" for the encore, an enraged Herbert stormed out of the orchestra pit refusing any further work with Trentini. Arthur Hammerstein, the operetta's sponsor, frantically began to search for another composer. Not finding anyone who could compose as well as Herbert, Hammerstein settled on the almost unknown Friml because of his classical training. After a month of work, Friml produced the score for what would be his first theatrical success. The Firefly was followed by 32 more Friml operettas, but it remained one of his most popular.

After tryouts at the Empire Theatre in Syracuse, New York beginning on October 14, 1912, The Firefly opened at the Lyric Theatre on December 2, 1912 to a warm reception by both the audience and the critics. The production moved to the Casino Theatre on December 30, where it ran until March 15, 1913. All told the production ran for 120 performances. Directed by Frederick G. Latham and conducted by Gaetano Merola, the operetta starred Trentini as Nina, Craig Campbell as Jack Travers, Irene Cassini as Antonio Columbo, Vera De Rosa as Sybil Vandare, Sammy Lee as Pietro, Audrey Maple as Geraldine Vandare, Ruby Norton as Suzette, Katherine Stewart as Mrs. Oglesby Vandare, Melville Stewart as John Thurston, Henry Vogel as Herr Franz, and George Williams as Correlli.

The 1937 MGM film version of the show, starring Jeanette MacDonald, added the song "The Donkey Serenade". After the film's release, this song has usually been added to revivals. In 1943 at the Los Angeles Civic Light Opera, Francia White starred as Nina. One of the more frequently revived Friml works, the first complete recording of the operetta was made by the Ohio Light Opera and released by Albany Records in 2006.

== Synopsis ==
Act I

At a Hudson River pier in New York City around 1909, snobby Geraldine Van Dare appears, quarreling with her fiancé, Jack Travers. Her uncle's yacht is preparing to sail for Bermuda. Geraldine accuses Jack of flirting with a little Italian street singer. They board, and the young woman in question, Nina Corelli, arrives and recognizes her old friend Suzette, Geraldine's maid. Nina did wink at Jack, but it wasn't serious ("Love Is Like a Firefly"). She wants to escape from her drunken guardian, and learning that Bermuda is farther away than Coney Island, she begs Suzette to take her along, but in vain. Nina runs home and puts on her brother's clothes. Back at the ship, she tells Suzette her new identity: Antonio Columbo, a known pickpocket ("Giannina Mia"). Musician Franz, boarding the yacht, decides that he needs this voice for his choir. He asks that this "boy" be allowed to accompany them. As the gangplank is raised, Nina runs aboard.

Act II

"Antonio" is popular in Bermuda at the Van Dares' estate, but the boy reminds sulky Geraldine of the street singer. Meanwhile, Nina has now really fallen in love with Jack, who has offered her a job as a valet. John Thurston, Jack's uncle, comforts Geraldine. The police are seeking a thief, Antonio Columbo, regarding a robbery on the island, and so Nina reveals her true identity. Franz adopts Nina, and the two leave together.

Act III

Three years later, Jack's romance with Geraldine has subsided. Just as Franz arrives at the Van Dare's home in New York, with Nina, Jack visits on a courtesy call. Under Franz's skillful teaching, Nina has now become the great prima donna "Giannina". Jack realises that he loves her, and Nina reveals that she has always loved him.

== Musical numbers ==
"Something" sung by Walter Van Brunt and Elizabeth Spencer. Released by Edison Records in 1913.

"Giannina Mia" sung by Allan Rogers. Released by Edison Records in 1920.

Act I

- A Trip to Bermuda – Sybil Van Dare, Suzette, Pietro and Chorus
- He Says Yes, She Says No! – Geraldine Van Dare, Jack Travers and Chorus
- Call Me Uncle – John Thurston, Sybil and Chorus
- Love Is Like a Firefly – Nina
- Something – Suzette and Jenkins
- Giannina (Mia) – Nina

Act II

- (In) Sapphire Seas – Sybil and Ensemble
- Tommy Atkins (On a Dress-Parade) (I Want to be a Jolly Soldier) – Nina and Ensemble
- Sympathy – Geraldine and John
- A Woman's Smile – Jack
- De Trop – Jenkins, Pietro, Suzette and Chorus
- We're Going to Make a Man of You – Nina, Herr Franz, Jack, John and Jenkins
- The Beautiful Ship from Toyland – Franz and Male Chorus
- When a Maid Comes Knocking at Your Heart – Nina, Jack and Franz

Act III

- An American Beauty Rose – John and Ensemble
- The Latest Thing from Paris – Pietro and Suzette
- Kiss Me and 'Tis Day (The Dawn of Love) – Nina
