= Craig Campbell =

Craig Campbell may refer to:

- Craig Campbell (BMX rider) (born 1969), retired British BMX freestyle rider
- Craig Campbell (comedian) (born 1969), Canadian comedian
- Craig Campbell (politician) (born 1952), lieutenant governor of Alaska
- Craig Campbell (singer) (born 1979), country music artist from Lyons, Georgia
  - Craig Campbell (album), his debut album
- Craig Campbell (tennis) (born 1963), South African tennis player
- Craig Campbell (tenor) (1878–1965), Canadian tenor
