= Polenblut =

Operetta by Oskar Nedbal

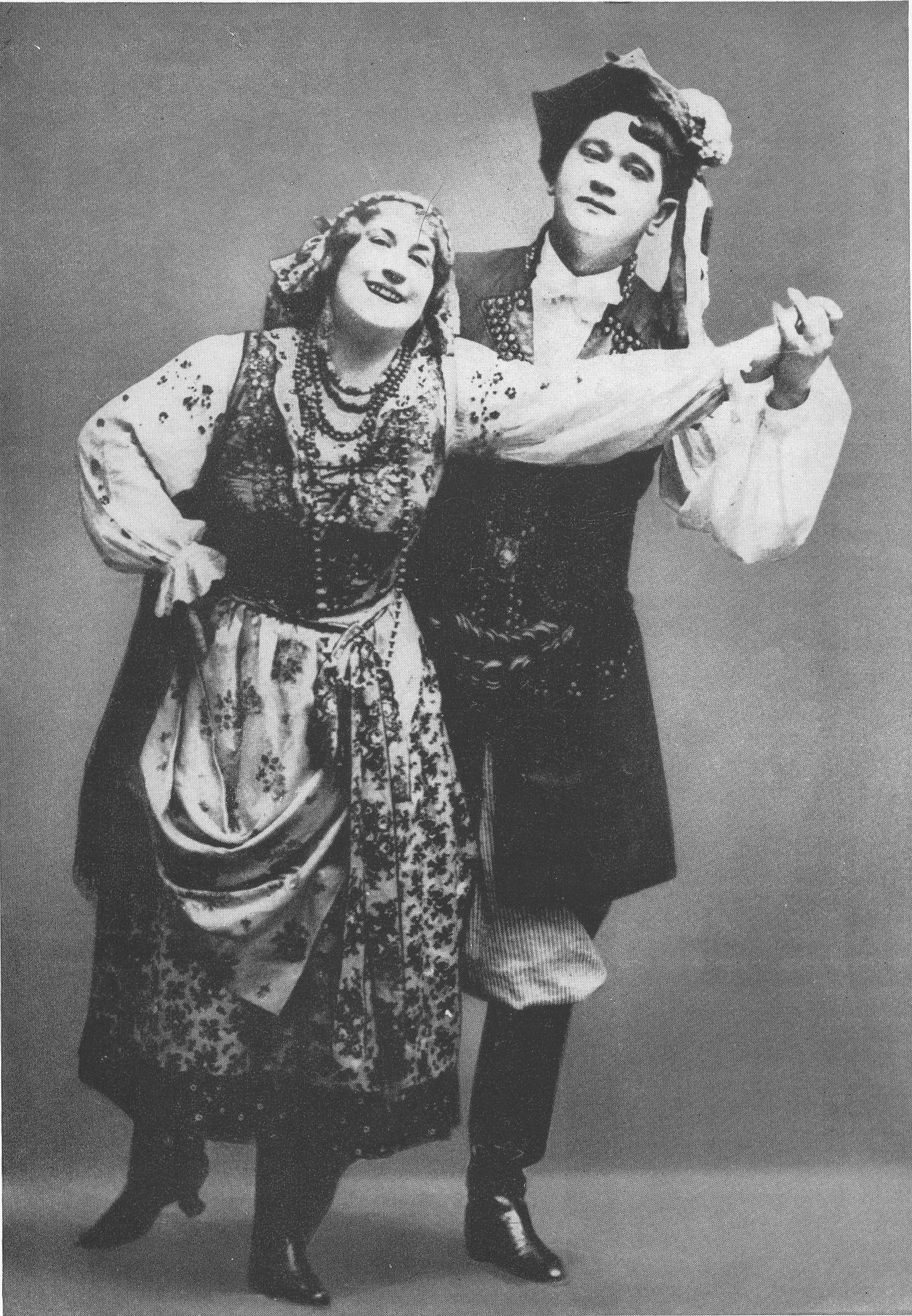
A premiere of Polenblut, Vienna, 1913

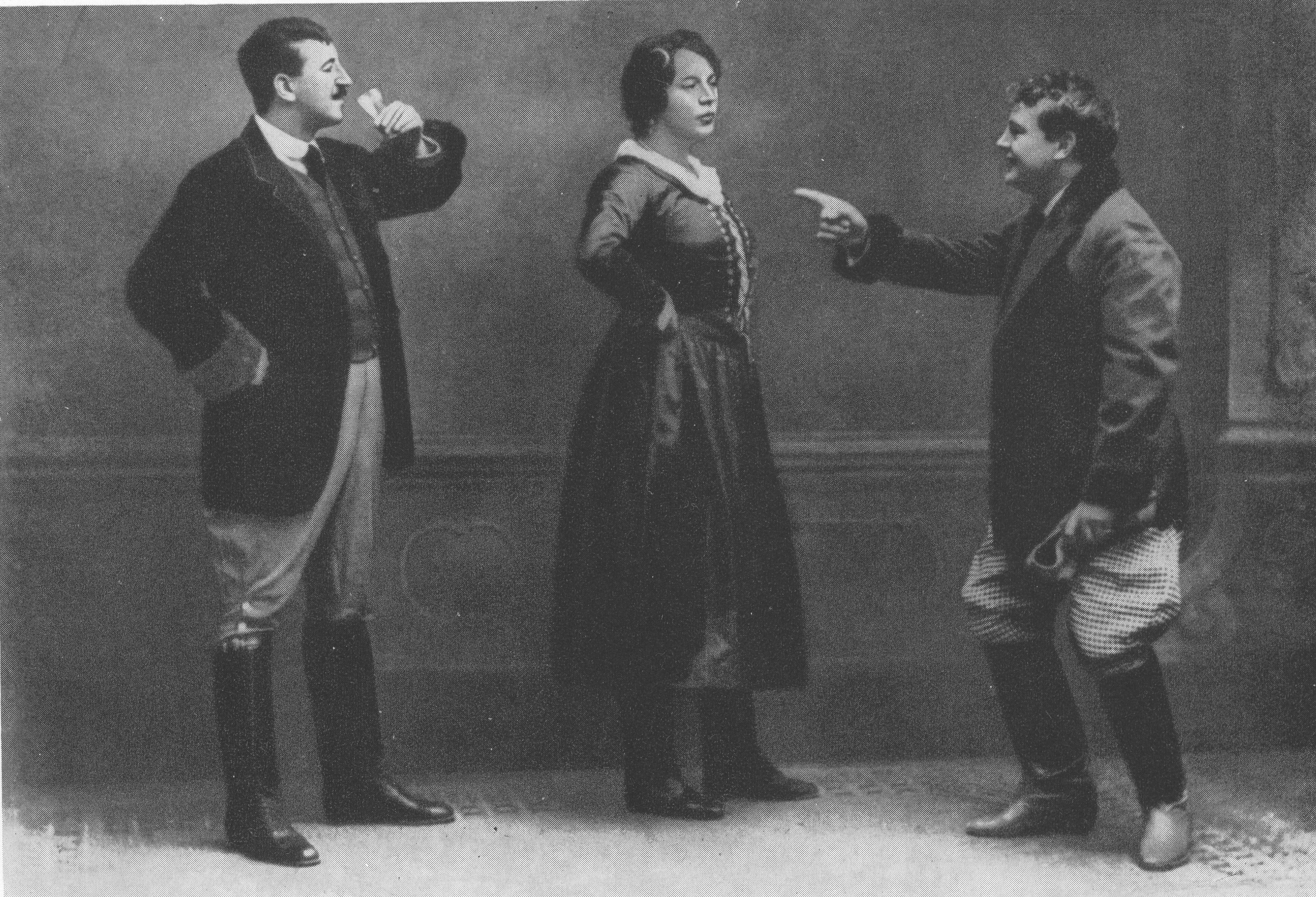
A 1914 Czech production of Polská krev

Polenblut (English: Polish Blood) is a German-language operetta in three scenes by Czech composer Oskar Nedbal with a libretto by Austrian playwright Leo Stein. It is allegedly loosely based on the short story "Mistress into Maid" (also known as "The Squire's Daughter") from The Belkin Tales by Russian author Alexander Pushkin; although Stein himself did not say this. It was one of the most popular operettas in Eastern Europe during World War I, but anti-German sentiment prevented the opera from finding a place on stages elsewhere other than in the United States where it was performed in a heavily modified adaptation under the name The Peasant Girl.

== Performance history ==
Polenblut premiered in Vienna at the Carltheater on 25 October 1913. The original cast included Karl Pfann as Count Boleslaw Baranski, Mizzi Zwerenz as Helena, Richard Waldemar as Pan Jan Zarembá, Kathe Ehren as Wanda, and Josef König as Popiel. It ran for a long time in Vienna; reaching its 250th performance on 26 January 1916 and continuing on past that.

The Czech version titled Polská krev was first staged at the Pilsen City Theatre on December 26, 1913, with libretto translated by Zdeněk Knittl, a tenor of the theatre. (Popiel: Richard Branald, Helena: Marie Vilímová, Zaremba: Adolf Kreuzmann, Bola: Antonín Vrba). On January 25, 1914 it premiered in Prague.

During World War I, Polenblut also had a long running production at the Theater des Westens in Berlin starring Käthe Dorsch as Helena. Simultaneously Sári Petráss starred in that part in a successful production in Budapest.

== Adaptations ==
It was adapted by Edgar Smith, Herbert Reynolds, and Harold Atteridge into the English-language operetta titled The Peasant Girl which premiered in 1914 in Buffalo, New York at the Teck Theatre. It played on Broadway in 1915 at the 44th Street Theatre in a production starring Emma Trentini and Clifton Crawford.

A musical film under the same title (versions in Czech and German) and based on the operetta was made in 1934.

In 1966, a TV film was produced in West Germany, directed by Wolfgang Liebeneiner, starring Horst Beck, Peter Garden, and Ina Dressel.
