= Lucy Isabelle Marsh =

American opera singer

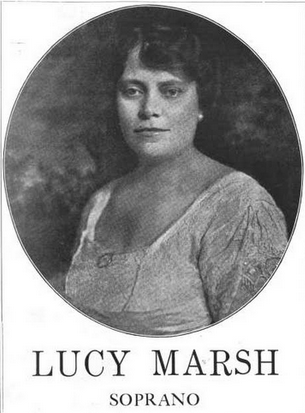

Background information
- Also known as: Anna Howard
- Born: April 10, 1878
- Died: January 20, 1956 (aged 77)
- Genres: Stage musical, screen classical
- Occupations: Soprano, artist
- Instruments: Performer & soprano (vocal)
- Years active: 1903–1927

Lucy Isabelle Marsh (April 10, 1878 – January 20, 1956) was an American lyric soprano who made her career as a professional recording artist for the Victor Talking Machine Company. She was an anonymous mainstay of the company, recording prodigiously from 1909 into the late 1920s. At the same time, she quickly won popular and critical recognition under her own name as a major artist on recordings for Victor.

== Biography ==
=== Training ===
Marsh obtained training in Paris under Baldelli, and under Trabadelo, who also taught Mary Garden. She studied under John Walter Hall in New York.

=== Career ===
Marsh sang in church choirs, and became lead soprano in important churches in New York City. As a Flower Maiden in the opera "Parsifal" she is known to have given nine performances at the Metropolitan Opera between November 1904 and March 1905. In 1908, she recorded three sides for Columbia Records.

In 1909, Marsh was engaged by The Victor Talking Machine Company in Camden, New Jersey, beginning her dual career as a recording artist and as a technically and artistically accomplished singer. Although she occasionally appeared on stage, she was best-known primarily through her many records for Victor.

The "recording artist" was essential to the commercial success of recording companies such as Victor in the early days of acoustic recording technology, from around 1902 through 1924. Female singers, particularly sopranos, were especially difficult to record well and singers were required whose sound quality registered well through the mechanical diaphragm. Marsh possessed such a "phonogenic" voice. Singers also needed to be quick studies at learning the latest song or an arrangement prepared for a recording. Such singers had to master the techniques of singing into a horn, which included knowing the best distance from the horn to stand for their voice, how and when to back away to avoid blasting or move forward for softer passages, how to adopt a position to blend with a partner or change positions to maintain the best balance when alternating lead passages with a partner, ensemble or accompanist. Marsh herself provided a description of the situation.

The Victor Talking Machine Company employed several fine singers as recording artists beginning with the company's founding in 1901, through the introduction of electrical recording in 1925. The Encyclopedic Discography of Victor Records, a project of researchers based at the University of California, Santa Barbara, has published the information contained in the session ledgers of Victor, supplemented with other sources. Examination of the database, made available on line, shows that Victor used many of these singers as anonymous members of several ensembles such as the Trinity Choir, the Lyric Quartet and the Victor Opera Quartet to produce recordings of "standards" and selections from shows, operas and operettas. Victor also afforded some of these artists occasional solo and ensemble recordings under their own names, some more and some less.

A popular specialty of the Victor company was a series of records known as "Gems from" operas, operettas and musical shows. These were attributed not to individual singers but to the Victor Opera Company, or Victor Light Opera Company. "Gems" were arrangements of fragments or medleys of selected numbers. A purchaser could expect to hear snatches of the most popular tunes and choruses, usually ending with an up-tempo number. Production of these records required several singers to collaborate by stepping forward at the proper time to sing solos into the horn and back for choral numbers. A typical "Gems" recording played for around four and a half minutes on one side of a 12-inch, 78 rpm record; occasionally, shows or operas contained enough material to merit two sides of a record. Many of these "Gems" records were re-recorded more than once but issued under the same catalog numbers. Over 25% of the Marsh matrices made between 1909 and 1922 were "Gems" records; another 38% were as a member of the Trinity Choir or Lyric Quartet, performing religious numbers or standards, and were also unattributed.

Marsh did stand out, however, in the number and quality of her solo recordings. About a quarter of the matrices, in the production of which Marsh participated, were solo recordings attributed to her on the label. At her first session for Victor, Marsh recorded "Angels ever bright and fair" from Handel's Theodora, an aria which is a test for the most accomplished soprano. Soon thereafter, Marsh solo recordings were moved from Victor's standard black label series, to the mid-priced purple label series, an exclusive position midway between the lower-priced black labels and the highly promoted and expensive Red Seal records. Marsh also recorded a few titles for Victor under the pseudonym of Anna Howard.

=== Artistic legacy ===
Collectors of recordings of vocal music who handle 78 rpm shellac records, particularly those made before 1925, cannot escape repeated contact with the ubiquitous recordings of Lucy Isabelle Marsh. In particular, aficionados of the classical repertory find that her recordings of classical and operatic standards often compare very favorably to those made by revered singers who had substantial stage careers. In 1957 Aida Favia-Artsay, a knowledgeable and perceptive critic of operatic singing, gave this assessment.

After a few turns of a Marsh disc, it becomes apparent that ... she could have had a brilliant operatic career. As far as voice goes, hers had all the requisites; and as for its production – a little more work in the chest register would have brought it up to par. Otherwise, she was musical, intelligent, resourceful, and obviously had a sound knowledge of the vocal technicalities. A pity that while her French was passable, her Italian left much to be desired.

Favia-Artsay's evaluation of several of her acoustic records provides detail for this assessment. A few selected quotations follow: The Nightingale (Alyabyev): "Exquisite timbre, individual voice – of virginal purity, round and equal. Precise chromatic scale, also the trill. Judicious phrasing and breath distribution." Spring's Awakening (Sanderson) "... Flowing, smooth coloratura. Phrasing fine:" O for the Wings of a Dove (Mendelssohn) "sings with subtle feeling. Not showy, but very artistic. Really an amazingly polished singer. Can hold her own with some of our best recording artists; and even top a few in some cases." Italian street song (Herbert) "Indeed, a brilliant piece of vocalization."

A generation later Michael Scott opined, "she was a particularly fine duet singer; with McCormack in 'Parle-moi de ma mère' from Carmen, she contrives a ravishing effect with her sweet and steady tones." Some of her later records made with a microphone were also held in high regard. Kutsch and Riemens speaks of "...masterly conceived recordings of arias from the Messiah and the oratorios of Mendelssohn and Rossini.".

=== Personal life ===
Marsh married Walter Colwell Gordon, a medical doctor, in 1910, and moved to Providence, Rhode Island. She had two sons, Calvin and Walter; Calvin also became a doctor, and Walter was a sales manager for several national companies. Marsh had four grandchildren. She died in 1956 at age seventy-seven.

Per Lucy Marsh's oldest grandchild (the only one born before she died):

Lucy and her husband had a grand house with three floors plus a basement at 118 Princeton Avenue, Providence, RI – built possibly as long ago as the early 1800s. The music room where Lucy taught lessons was on the first floor of the house. The property included a large lawn and a carriage house, which was converted to a medical office for Lucy's husband, a physician (General Practitioner).

Lucy and her husband also enjoyed time at their beach house at Point Judith, RI. The beach house was destroyed by a strong hurricane in 1938.

One of the clearest memories of Lucy's grandchild was the very formal family dinners. Lucy sat at the head of the table, with house staff coming in to serve on queue when Lucy rang a bell for each course.

To the best recollection of her grandchild, Lucy never spoke of her family, any siblings, where she was from, or similar matters. None of Lucy's relatives attended the formal family dinners. Lucy's family lineage was Dutch.

Lucy employed a nanny to care for her two sons, as she was often away from home singing at the Met or traveling overseas for work. Lucy is remembered by her granddaughter as a nice person, but someone who always maintained a fairly composed, formal demeanor even with family members.

Lucy's granddaughter does remember very fondly listening to Lucy sing at home, as well as teaching voice lessons to up and coming singers including Roberta Peters. A particularly fond memory was witnessing Lucy at the piano with her son, Walter, standing by her, as they sung "Danny Boy" as a duet.

Lucy was challenged with physical ailments in her later years, resulting in her being bedridden for much of her last three to five years of life. It's unclear what ailments she suffered from, or the specific cause of her death. Much to the dismay and frustration of her physician-husband, Lucy was often resistant to accepting medical care.

== Hit records ==
Year	Single	US Chart
1908	"The Glow-Worm" (from the Broadway musical The Girl Behind the Counter)	1
1910	"My Hero" (from the Broadway musical The Chocolate Soldier)	2
1910	"Ring O' Roses" (with Harry Macdonough; from the Broadway musical The Dollar Princess)	8
1910	"Every Little Movement" (with Harry Macdonough; from the Broadway musical Madame Sherry)	1
1911	"Italian Street Song" (with the Victor Light Opera Co.; from the Broadway musical Naughty Marietta)	2
1911	"My Beautiful Lady" (from the Broadway musical The Pink Lady)	3
1912	"Melody of Love" (from the Broadway musical Gypsy Love)	10
1912	"The Maids of Cadiz (Les Filles de Cadiz)" (non-Broadway musical release)	5
1912	"To the Land of My Own Romance (I Have a Dream, By Night, By Day)" (from the Broadway musical The Enchantress)	5
1913	"Homeland" (from the Broadway musical The Merry Countess)	6
1915	Aida – O Terra Addio ("Farewell, Oh Earth") (with John McCormack; non-Broadway musical release)	9
1916	"Just a-Wearyin' for You" (non-Broadway musical release)	10
1917	"Babes in the Wood" (with Harry Macdonough; from the Broadway musical Very Good Eddie)	2
1921	"Deep in Your Eyes" (from the Broadway musical The Half Moon)	15
1922	"The Song of Love" (with Royal Dadmun; from the Broadway musical Blossom Time)	2

All the above were released by Victor, except for "The Glow-Worm", which was released by Columbia.
