= Vida Whitmore =

American actress and businesswoman (1882–1978)

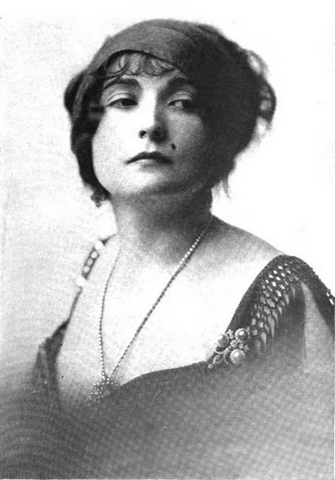
- Born: 1882
- Died: 1978 (aged 95–96)

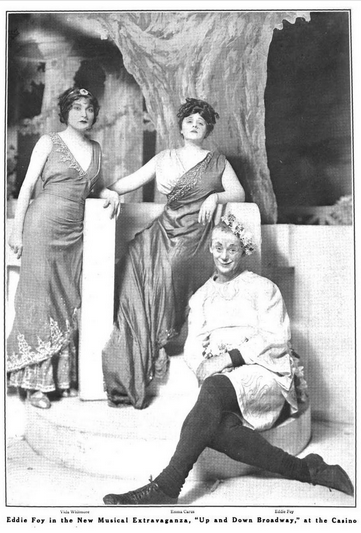
Vida Whitmore, Emma Carus, and Eddie Foy Sr. in Up and Down Broadway (1910)

Vida Whitmore (1882 – February 23, 1978), later Vida L. W. Hudson, was an American musical theatre actress, businesswoman, and major benefactor of Columbia University.

== Early life ==
Vida L. Whitmore was from Petersburg, Virginia, one of seven siblings born to Emmet Archer Whitmore and Martha Merrill Whitmore.

== Career ==
Whitmore went to London in 1903 with the show Dolly Varden. On Broadway she appeared in The Earl and the Girl (1905), Miss Dolly Dollars (1905), Up and Down Broadway (1910). and The Balkan Princess (1911).

She co-founded Whitmore & Lyden Dressmaking Company, incorporated in New York in 1907. The company employed twenty dressmakers in its first year of operation.

== Personal life and legacy ==
Vida Whitmore married twice. She married Mandeville de Marigny Hall in 1908. He was still married to his first wife at the time, and was soon arrested for passing bad checks and other crimes. Hall pawned about $20,000 worth of Whitmore's jewelry while they were on honeymoon in Europe. That marriage was annulled in 1912. She married Percy Kierstede Hudson, a stockbroker, after being named in his well-publicized 1928 divorce. The couple were living in Guatemala in 1959.

She was widowed in 1962, and she died in 1978, aged 95 years, in Palm Beach, Florida. Together the Hudsons left twelve million dollars to Columbia University. There are several professorships at Columbia named for Percy K. and Vida L. W. Hudson.
