= Craig Campbell (tenor) =

Canadian opera singer

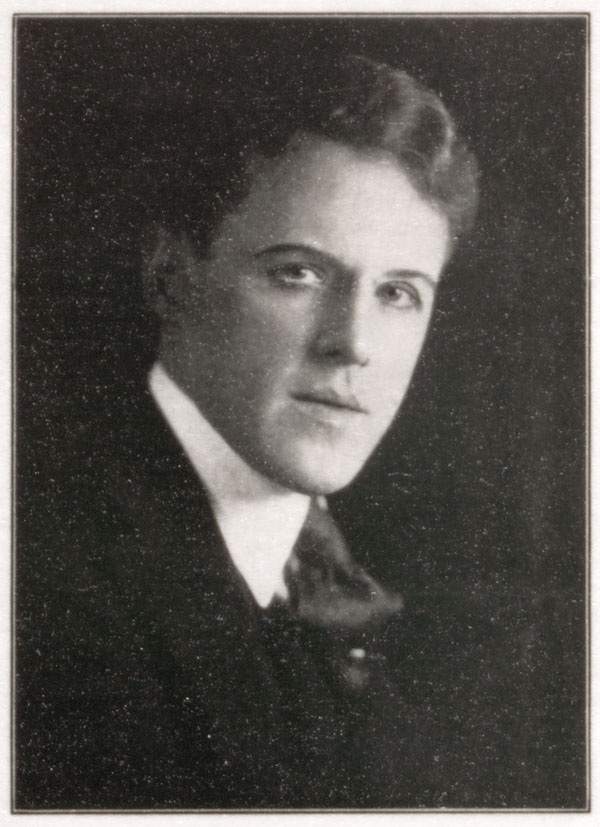

Robert Craig Campbell (1878–1965) was a Canadian tenor who performed in operettas across Canada and the United States. Campbell recorded with the Columbia, Davega, Perfect and Pathé labels. Although a tenor, Campbell had a very rich voice and could also sing baritone, and described himself as a tenore robusto.

== Childhood ==
Campbell was born in London, Ontario to Alexander and Elizabeth Campbell in 1878. While Campbell was young, the family moved several times, living in Hamilton and Owen Sound before settling down in Winnipeg. His first performance on stage took place in Winnipeg, when he performed for the High School Literary Society.

== Career ==
Campbell made a formal debut in 1909 in the role of Alfred Blake in The Love Cure by Edmund Eysler at the New Amsterdam Theatre. He began touring the United States and Canada as a vaudeville tenor on the Keith-Orpheum and Loew tour circuits. In 1912, Campbell starred as Jack Travers in the first production of Rudolf Friml's operetta The Firefly, which was performed at the Lyric Theatre. The female lead was Emma Trentini. This would lead to Campbell's first recording, when he recorded the song A Woman's Smile from this play for the Columbia Record Company.

Campbell became a member of the American Society of Singers in 1914. Campbell began giving performances in American opera halls and on concert stages. He appeared as a lead with Julia Claussen in Faust and Helena at the New York Symphony Orchestra in 1918. The next year, he sang Die Fledermaus with the St. Louis Municipal Opera. In 1931, he sang the role of Dick Dauntless in Ruddigore which was performed in Erlanger's Theater. Campbell retired from the stage sometime in the late 1930s, but continued to perform as an amateur in St. John's Episcopal Church's choir in Jersey City, New Jersey until 1954. He died in New York in 1965.

== Recordings ==
- A dream by James Bartlett and Charles Cory, recorded June 1912, released 1912 as Side A on Columbia Phonograph Company #A 1249.

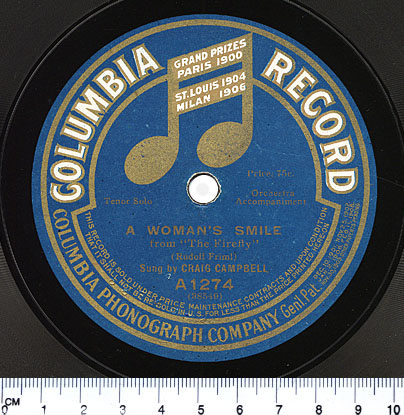
A Woman's Smile

- A woman's smile by Rudolph Friml, Gus Kahn and Otto Harbach, recorded June 1912, released 1912 as Side A on Columbia Phonograph Company #A 1274.
- Oh! That we two were maying with Grace Kerns by Alice Mary Smith, recorded June 2, 1913, released August 1913 as Side A on Columbia Phonograph Company #A1341.
- Good-bye by Paolo Tosti, recorded October 1918, released December 1919 as Side A on Pathé Frères Phonograph Company #25024 // I mind the day by Charles Willeby, recorded September 1919 as Side B.
- Silver Threads Among the Gold by Eben Rexford and Hart Danks, recorded June 1922, released December 15, 1922 as Side A on Pathé Frères Phonograph Company #5032 // We've been chums for fifty years by Thurland Chattaway, recorded June 1922.
- Who knows? by Ernest Ball and Paul Laurence Dunbar, recorded June 1922, released December 1922 as Side A on Pathé Frères Phonograph Company #025101. // The banks of Allan Water by Charles Edward Horn, as Side B
- Bonnie sweet Bessie by Arabella Root and James Gilbert, recorded December 1922, released June 1924 as Side A on Pathé Frères Phonograph Company #11527 // Believe me, if all those endearing young charms by Thomas Moore and Sir John Stevenson, recorded April 1924, as Side B.
