= Enlighten Thy Daughter (1934 film) =

1934 film

- Directed by: John Varley
- Written by: Ivan Abramson (story); Arthur Hoerl; Betty Laidlaw; Robert Lively
- Produced by: Robert Mintz; Louis Weiss
- Starring: Herbert Rawlinson; Charles Eaton; Claire Whitney
- Cinematography: Ernest Miller; Nick Rogelli
- Edited by: Patricia Rooney
- Music by: Lou Herscher
- Production company: Exploitation Pictures
- Distributed by: Exploitation Pictures; Weiss Brothers; First Division Pictures; Majestic Pictures; Wardour Films (UK)
- Release date: January 15, 1934
- Running time: 75 minutes
- Country: United States
- Language: English

Enlighten Thy Daughter is a 1934 American drama film directed by John Varley and starring Herbert Rawlinson, Charles Eaton and Claire Whitney. It was shot at the Photocolor Studios in Hastings-on-Hudson, New York. It is a remake of the 1917 silent film of the same title by Ivan Abramson.

== Cast ==
- Herbert Rawlinson as Dr. Richard Stevens
- Beth Barton as Ruth Stevens
- Charles Eaton as David Stevens
- Claire Whitney as Alice Stevens
- Edmund MacDonald as Gerald Winthrop
- Russell Hicks as Daniel Stevens
- Ara Gerald as Ethel Stevens
- Miriam Battista as Lillian Stevens
- Vinton Hayworth as Stanley Jordan
- Eunice Reed as Margie
- Wesley Barry as Wes
- Audrey Maple as Mrs. Crosby
- Lillian Walker as Mrs. Grainger
- Robert Emmett Keane as Dr. Palmer
- Ruth Denning as Singer
- Robert Lively as Singer
- Paul Vincent as Orchestra Leader

== Bibliography ==
- Koszarski, Richard. Hollywood on the Hudson: Film and Television in New York from Griffith to Sarnoff. Rutgers University Press, 2008.
- Soister, John T., Nicolella, Henry & Joyce, Steve . American Silent Horror, Science Fiction and Fantasy Feature Films, 1913-1929. McFarland, 2014.
