= The Melting Pot (play) =

1908 play by Israel Zangwill

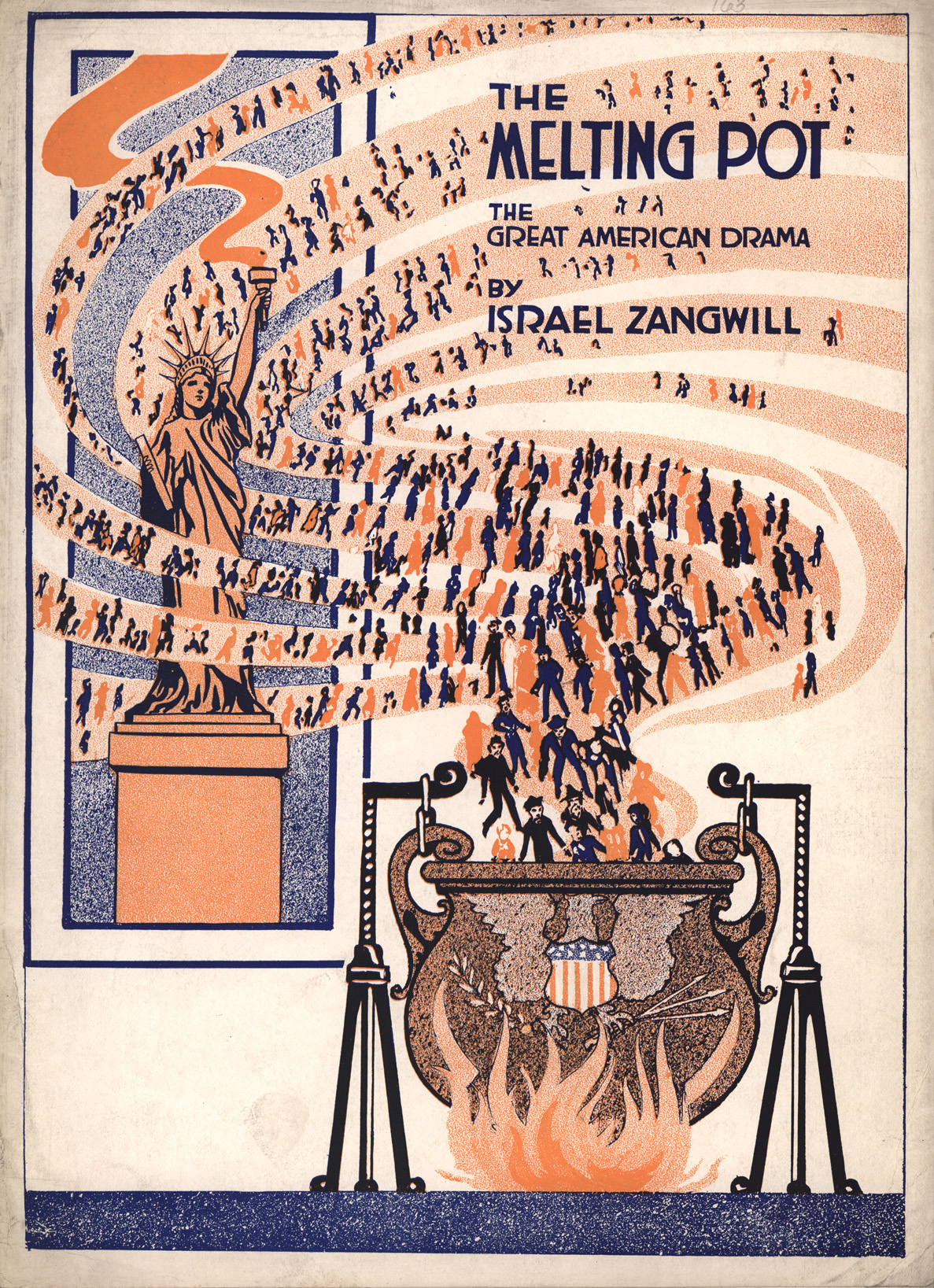
- Theatre Programme for The Melting Pot (1916).
- Written by: Israel Zangwill
- Characters: David Quixano

Premiere
- Date: September 6, 1909
- Place: Comedy Theatre
- Directed by: Hugh Ford

The Melting Pot is a play by Israel Zangwill, first staged in 1908. It depicts the life of a Russian Jewish immigrant family, the Quixanos, in the United States. David Quixano has survived a pogrom, which killed his mother and sister, and he wishes to forget this horrible event. He composes an "American Symphony" and wants to look forward to a society free of ethnic divisions and hatred, rather than backward at his traumatic past.

== Plot ==
David Quixano emigrates to America in the wake of the 1903 Kishinev Massacre in which his entire family is killed. He writes a great symphony called "The Crucible" expressing his hope for a world in which all ethnicity has melted away, and falls in love with a beautiful Russian Christian immigrant named Vera. The dramatic peak of the play is the moment when David meets Vera's father, who turns out to be the Russian officer responsible for the annihilation of David's family. Vera's father admits his guilt, the symphony is performed to accolades, David and Vera agree to wed and kiss as the curtain falls.

== Title ==
David, the hero, proclaims:

There she lies, the great Melting Pot—listen! Can't you hear the roaring and the bubbling? There gapes her mouth [He points east]—the harbour where a thousand mammoth feeders come from the ends of the world to pour in their human freight. Ah, what a stirring and a seething! Celt and Latin, Slav and Teuton, Greek and Syrian,—black and yellow—

VERA: Jew and Gentile—

DAVID: Yes, East and West, and North and South, the palm and the pine, the pole and the equator, the crescent and the cross—how the great Alchemist melts and fuses them with his purging flame! Here shall they all unite to build the Republic of Man and the Kingdom of God. Ah, Vera, what is the glory of Rome and Jerusalem where all nations and races come to worship and look back, compared with the glory of America, where all races and nations come to labour and look forward!

Although the idea of "melting" as a metaphor for ethnic assimilation had been used before, Zangwill's play popularized the term "melting pot" as a symbol for this occurrence in American society.

== Early productions ==
The Melting Pot opened in Washington, DC, at the Columbia Theatre, on October 5, 1908. President Theodore Roosevelt, in attendance that night, is said to have shouted "That's a great play, Mr. Zangwill." It opened at the Comedy Theatre in New York on September 6, 1909, and ran for 136 performances. It was produced by Liebler & Company and staged (directed) by Hugh Ford. As in the original production, Walker Whiteside played David, Henry Vogel played Herr Pappelmeister and Chrystal Herne (daughter of James A. Herne) played Vera.

== Revival ==
The play received a production at New York's Metropolitan Playhouse in March 2006.

The play was performed at the Finborough Theatre, London, in December 2017. It was the first UK production of The Melting Pot since 1938.

== Sources ==
- Edna Nahshon, From the Ghetto to the Melting Pot: Israel Zangwill's Jewish Plays (Wayne State University Press), 2006. ISBN 978-0-8143-2955-9
