= Kate Elinore =

American vaudeville entertainer

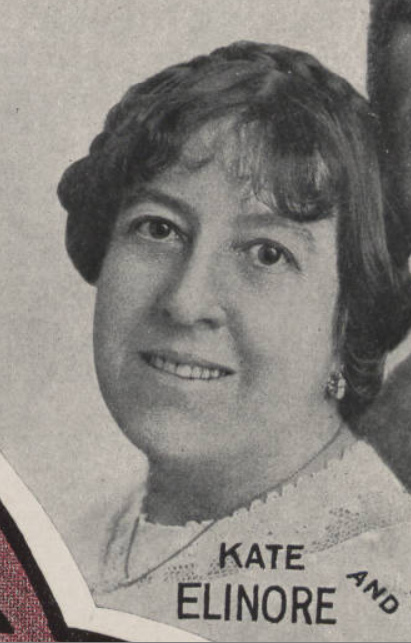
Kate Elinore

Kate Elinore (December 2, 1876 – December 30, 1924) was an American vaudeville entertainer remembered for her comedy double-act with her sister May, and for creating the role of Lizette in Naughty Marietta.

== Biography ==
Kate Elinore was born on December 2, 1876, in Brooklyn, New York. Elinore's comedic characters were based on female impersonators.

She began her career in vaudeville in a comic act with her sister May Elinore. On July 30, 1894, she made her first appearance with her sister in Atlantic City, New Jersey. The Elinore Sisters joined Tony Pastor's Company in New York in 1896. For 15 years, the Elinore Sisters developed a series of Irish American characters and "exploited ethnic, class, and gender hierarchies in creating their humor".

In 1909, she teamed with Sam Williams (1884–1961), who worked in vaudeville as a pianist. She later married him. Elinore was featured as a musical comedy actress in the role of Lizette in the original production of Victor Herbert's operetta Naughty Marietta in 1910. Historian Karen Halttunen considers Elinore "a rare woman in the rough field of ethnic comedy".

Elinore died on December 30, 1924, in Indianapolis, Indiana, following "a mysterious illness".
