= Naughty Marietta (film) =

1935 American operetta film

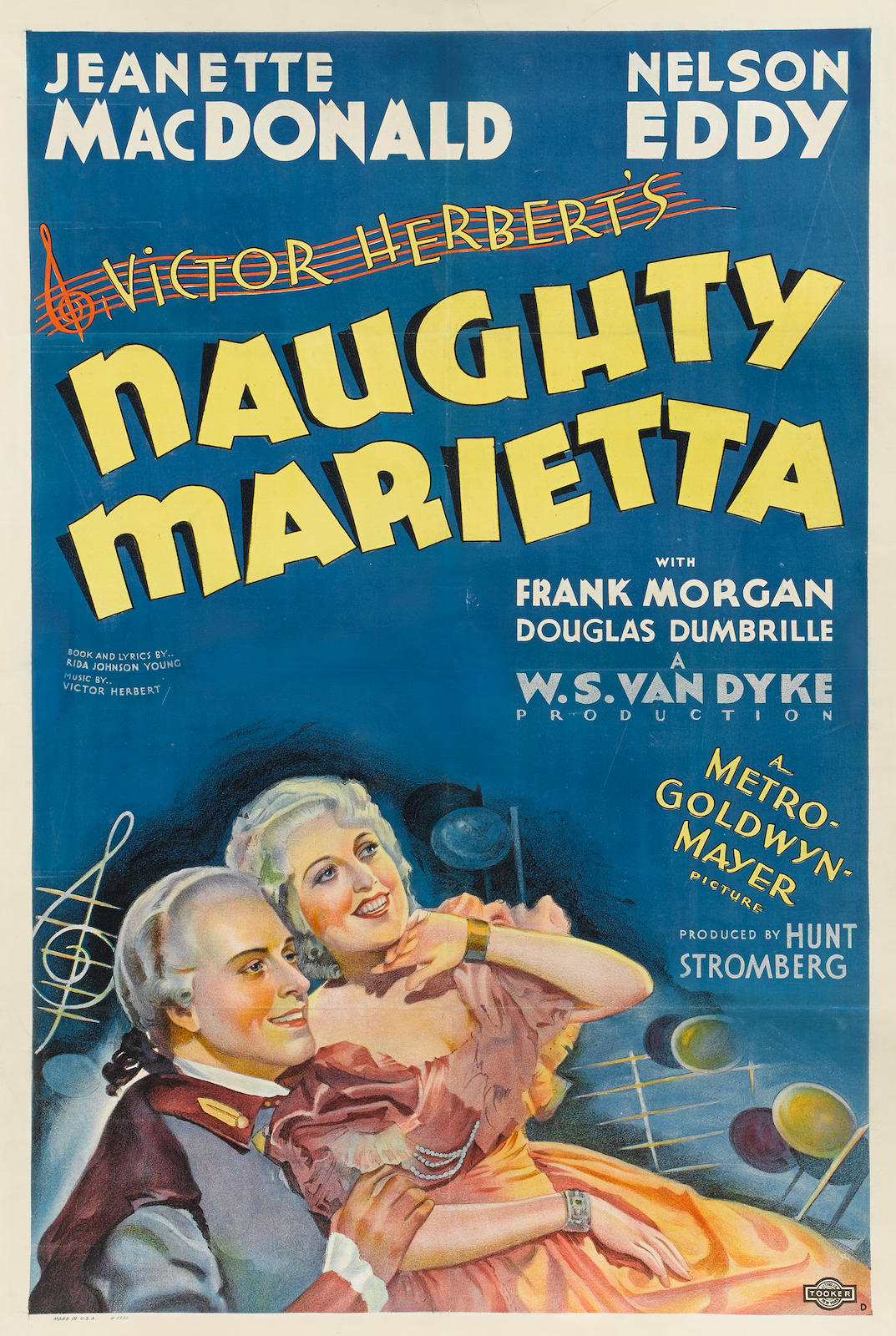
- Theatrical release poster
- Directed by: Robert Z. Leonard; W. S. Van Dyke
- Screenplay by: Frances Goodrich; Albert Hackett; John Lee Mahin
- Based on: Naughty Marietta; 1910 operetta by Victor Herbert and Rida Johnson Young
- Produced by: Hunt Stromberg; W. S. Van Dyke
- Starring: Jeanette MacDonald; Nelson Eddy; Frank Morgan; Douglass Dumbrille
- Cinematography: William H. Daniels
- Edited by: Blanche Sewell
- Music by: Victor Herbert
- Production company: Metro-Goldwyn-Mayer
- Distributed by: Loew's, Inc.
- Release dates: March 8, 1935 (Premiere); March 29, 1935
- Running time: 103 minutes
- Country: United States
- Language: English
- Budget: $782,000
- Box office: $2.1 million

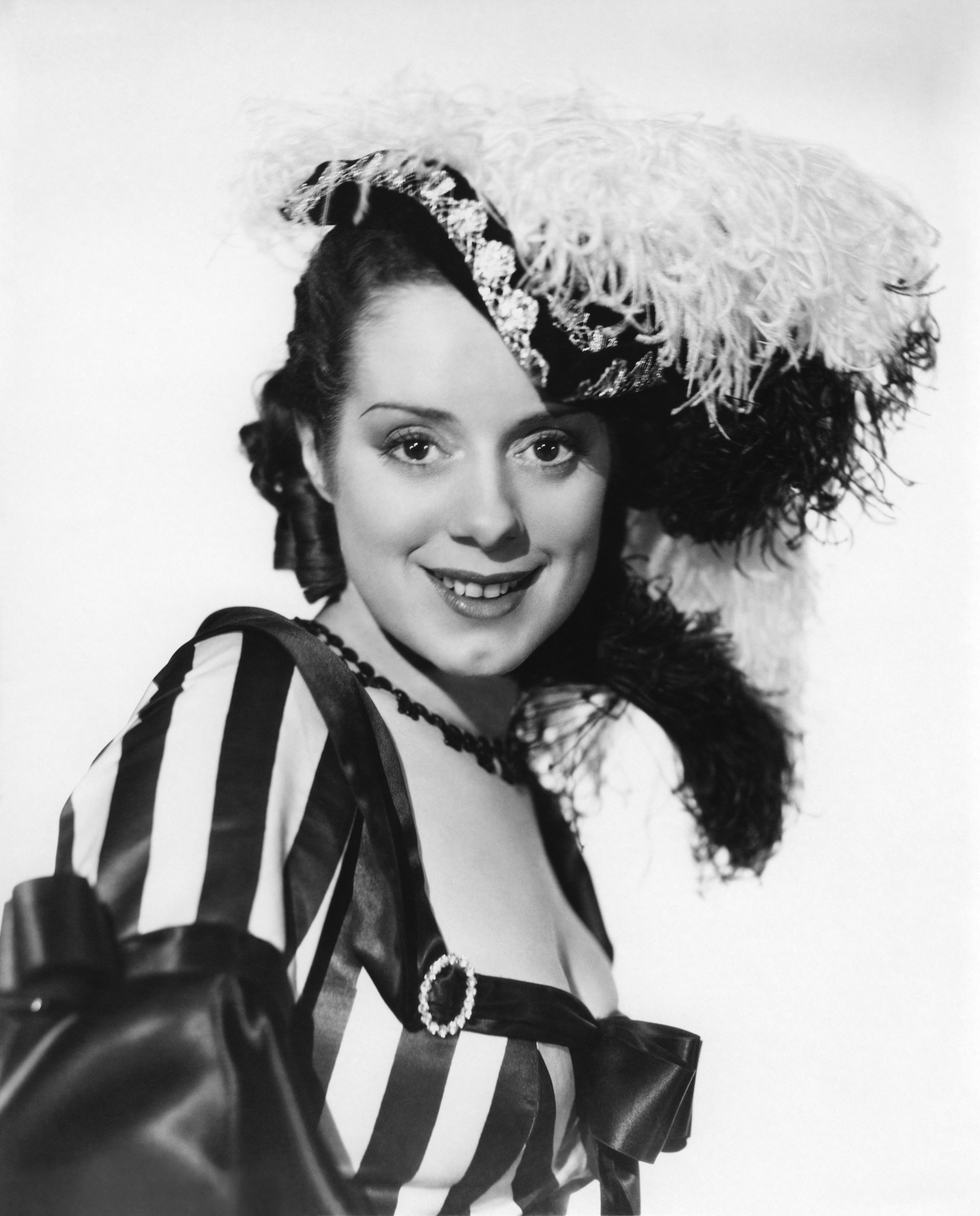
Elsa Lanchester as Madame d'Annard

Naughty Marietta is a 1935 American romantic musical film based on the 1910 operetta of the same name by Victor Herbert. Jeanette MacDonald stars as a princess who flees an arranged marriage. She sails for New Orleans and is rescued from pirates by Captain Richard Warrington (Nelson Eddy). Five of Herbert's most famous songs come from the score of Naughty Marietta, with words by lyricist Rida Johnson Young: "Ah! Sweet Mystery of Life", "Italian Street Song", "Neath the Southern Moon", "I'm Falling in Love with Someone" and "Tramp! Tramp! Tramp! (Along the Highway)". Additional lyrics for several of Herbert's songs were penned for the film by Gus Kahn. The film was written by Frances Goodrich, Albert Hackett, John Lee Mahin and Rida Johnson Young.

== Plot ==
To avoid an arranged marriage to Don Carlos, an elderly Spanish duke, Princess Marie masquerades as her uncle's former servant, Marietta, and escapes from France on a ship with casquette girls who are traveling to New Orleans to marry colonists. On board, Marietta befriends Julie.

En route, the women discuss what type of man they want to marry. "Marietta" shocks the other girls by stating that she does not intend to marry anyone. Shortly after, the ship is boarded by pirates, who kill the entire crew and take the girls ashore.

After the pirates divide the loot, they turn their attention to the girls. Just then, singing is heard ("Tramp! Tramp! Tramp!"). The pirates extinguish their torches and fire to try to avoid detection, but Marietta takes one of the torches and runs towards the sound of the singing, crying out "help, help". Mercenaries rout the pirates and rescue the women.

The mercenaries' leader, Captain Richard Warrington, sings "Neath a Southern Moon" to Marietta. Despite his attraction to her, however, Warrington declares that he does not intend to marry.

Warrington and his men take the casquette girls to New Orleans, where they are welcomed by the governor. The women are housed in the convent while they get to know their potential husbands. When some men approach Marietta, she declares that she does not want to marry any of them. The governor feels that he has seen Marietta before in Paris, but she denies it. When she pretends to have a disreputable past, the governor orders a pair of soldiers to escort her away in disgrace. Warrington relieves them of their duty and finds her a place to stay, even paying the first month's rent. Though Marietta tries to rid herself of Warrington, he is undaunted. Just then, a group of gypsies stroll by, advertising their Marionette Theater. The gypsy leader, Rodolpho, has his daughter sing, and Warrington joins in ("Italian Street Song"). Stung by Warrington's remark that she might not be able to sing as well as the gypsy, Marietta surprises him by doing so beautifully. While he is distracted getting rid of three would-be suitors, she slips away.

The following day, Warrington discovers that Marietta is working at the Marionette Theater. When he visits her after the performance, he receives a warmer reception. Soon after, however, a large award is offered for information about her whereabouts. Warrington persuades her to trust him, and takes her away by boat. During this time together, they discover that they are falling in love with each other ("I'm Falling in Love with Someone"). Later, however, they are found by French soldiers, and her true identity is revealed. Her uncle and Don Carlos are expected on the next ship to take her back.

Marietta is to attend a ball arranged by the governor in her honor. Julie comes to see her; she tells Marietta that Warrington had been ordered to leave New Orleans that day, but intends to come to the ball. Her uncle warns her that "if Warrington attempted to see her again, he would be arrested for treason and shot". Marietta asks Julie to stop Warrington from coming, but they realize it is too late when they hear him and his men singing ("Tramp! Tramp! Tramp!").

When Warrington enters the ballroom, the governor tries to get him to leave in order to save his life. Marietta pretends to have been toying with him to deceive her uncle. As Warrington is leaving, Marietta sings "Ah, Sweet Mystery of Life", joined by Warrington. The lovers then flee to the wild frontier.

== Cast ==
- Jeanette MacDonald as Princess Marie de Namour de la Bonfain (Marietta Franini)
- Nelson Eddy as Captain Richard Warrington
- Frank Morgan as Governor Gaspard d'Annard
- Elsa Lanchester as Madame d'Annard
- Douglas Dumbrille as Prince de Namour de la Bonfain (Uncle to Princess Marie)
- Cecilia Parker as Julie
- Walter Kingsford as Don Carlos de Braganza
- Joseph Cawthorne as Herr Schumann
- Greta Meyer as Frau Schumann
- Akim Tamiroff as Rudolpho
- Harold Huber as Abraham "Abe"
- Edward Brophy as Ezekial "Zeke" Cramer
- Helen Shipman as Servant to Princess Marie's uncle (the real Marietta Franini)
- Adriana Caselotti as Dancing Doll (uncredited)
- Mary Doran as Casquette Girl (uncredited)
- Raymond Massey as Pirate (uncredited)
- William Burress as Petshop Keeper (uncredited)

== Reception ==
=== Box office ===
Naughty Marietta grossed a total (domestic and foreign) of US$2,057,000 (equivalent to US$48,304,551 in 2025): $1,058,000 from the US and Canada and $999,000 elsewhere. It made a profit of $407,000.

=== Accolades ===
Naughty Marietta was nominated for the Academy Award for Best Picture. Douglas Shearer won the Academy Award for Best Sound Recording for his work on the picture. It also won the Photoplay Medal of Honor for the Best Picture of 1935. In 2003, Naughty Marietta was selected for preservation in the United States National Film Registry by the Library of Congress as being "culturally, historically, or aesthetically" significant.

== In popular culture ==
- "Ah! Sweet Mystery of Life" and "Falling in Love with Someone" are used in the musical Thoroughly Modern Millie.
- In the All in the Family episode "Archie the Gambler", "Ah! Sweet Mystery of Life" is sung by cast members Jean Stapleton, Rob Reiner and Sally Struthers.
- In the 1971 Woody Allen film Bananas, a political prisoner is tortured by being forced to endlessly listen to the Naughty Marietta score.
- The song "Ah! Sweet Mystery of Life" was used in Mel Brooks' 1974 comedy Young Frankenstein, with parts of the refrain sung by Madeline Kahn and Teri Garr.
- In a second-season episode of The Muppet Show, guest starring Zero Mostel, Miss Piggy expresses interest in performing Naughty Marietta.
- A 1978 episode of The Waltons, "Spring Fever", has the Walton children in a cinema watching Naughty Marietta, and listening to "Ah! Sweet Mystery of Life".
- In the 1980 film Bon Voyage, Charlie Brown (and Don't Come Back!!), Naughty Marietta is the in-flight movie on the plane when Charlie Brown, Linus Van Pelt, Peppermint Patty, Marcie, Snoopy and Woodstock travel to England.
- In a 1983 episode of Fantasy Island, a visitor asks Mr. Roarke to have her daughter sing in an operetta, Naughty Marietta.
