= Henry Vogel =

American actor

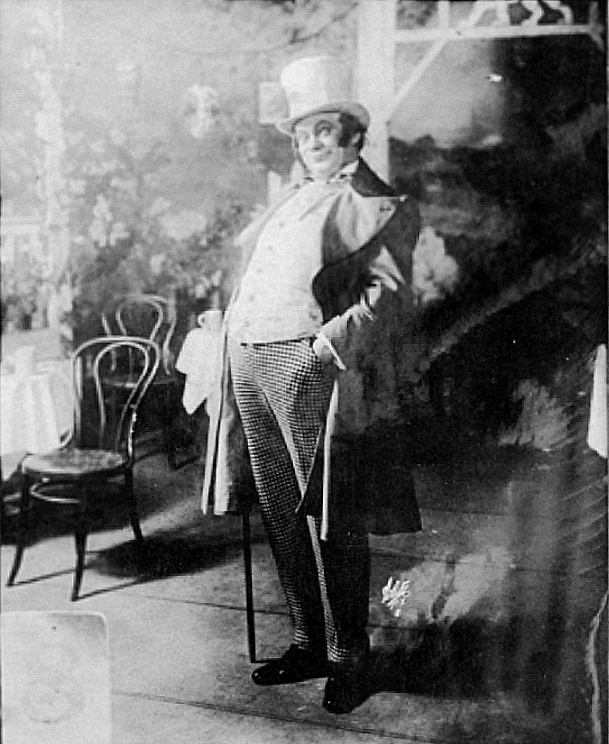
- Henry Vogel publicity shot from the play Princess Tra-La-La, 1916
- Born: June 15, 1863; Mindszent, Hungary
- Died: June 17, 1925 (aged 62); New York, NY, US
- Occupation: Stage Actor
- Years active: 1888–1920

Henry Vogel (June 15, 1863 – June 17, 1925) was an American actor and bass-baritone singer who originated several roles on the Broadway stage during the first two decades of the Twentieth Century.

== Early life ==
Henry Vogel was born Heinrich Vogelhut in Mindszent, Hungary. Ignoring his parents' wishes that he enter the clergy, he left Hungary for America in 1882.

== Career ==
After his arrival in America, he obtained US citizenship and attended the Balatka Academy of Musical Art, founded by Hans Balatka in Chicago during the late 1880s. There (as Henry Vogelhuth), he performed in several of its productions before moving to New York City. In 1890 (as Henry Vogel) he appeared in an English-language version of Jacques Offenbach's The Brigands starring Lillian Russell, and in 1903, he landed a role in the Broadway production of Nancy Brown. Other productions followed, including Paris by Night (1904), Miss Dolly Dollars (1905), and Victor Herbert’s The Wizard of the Nile (1908).

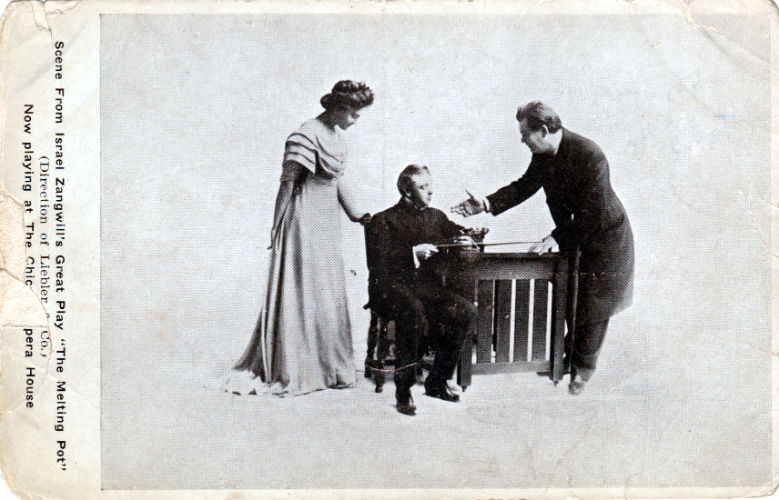
Vogel (right) in The Melting Pot with Walker Whiteside (middle) and unidentified actress (left)

It was announced in the press in 1907 that Byron Ongley (co-author of Brewster’s Millions) had written a vaudeville skit for him, Vogel, the Boy Detective, and His Shadow, Nearly – the shadow to be played by a midget.

Back on the Broadway stage in 1909, he played Herr Pappelmeister to Walker Whiteside’s David Quixano in the original 1909 production of Israel Zangwill’s play, The Melting Pot. His turn as Pappelmeister received acclaim, and the production itself was favorably reviewed by then US president Theodore Roosevelt.

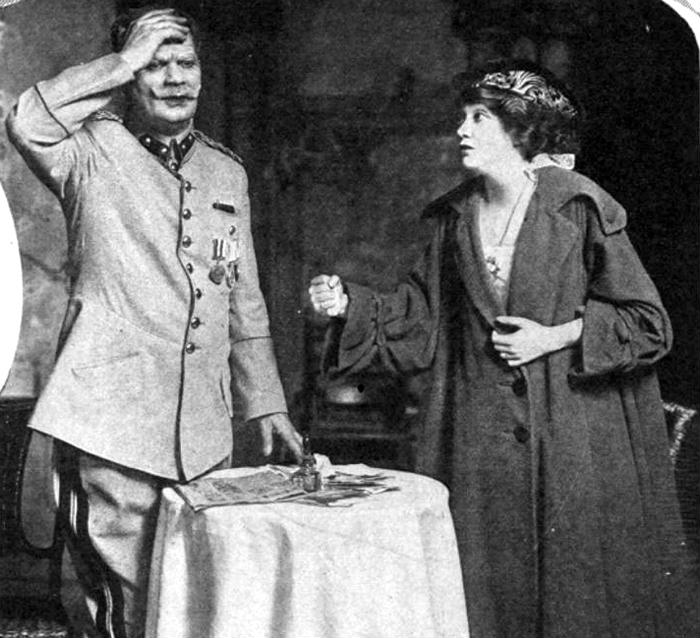
Vogel (left) as General Klaus and Fay Bainter (right) as Ruth Sherwood, in Arms and the Girl, 1916

Vogel went on to prominent roles in several other Broadway plays and operettas, including The Firefly (1912), Marie-Odile (1915), and Arms and the Girl (1916). Health issues caused him to move to California to pursue work in films, including The Spanish Dancer (1923) as Olivares, but continued ill health forced his retirement and return to New York.

== Family ==
Henry Vogel was the son of David Vogelhut and Eleanora "Leni" Vogelhut (née Propper) and was Jewish.

== Death ==
Henry Vogel died in New York City two days after his 62nd birthday, following a heart attack.

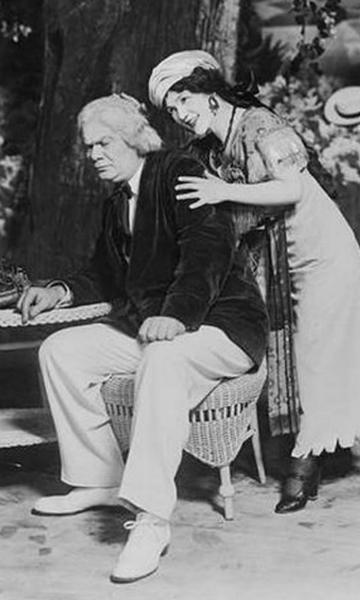
Vogel and Emma Trentini in The Firefly, 1912

== Selected plays ==
- Nancy Brown (1903), Henry Vogel as Baron Sauerbraten
- Miss Dolly Dollars (1905) as Lieutenant von Richter
- The Wizard of the Nile (1908) as King Ptolemy
- Dolly Varden (Previous to May 1908, Bijou, New Brunswick, N.J)
- The Melting Pot (1909) as Herr Pappelmeister
- The Little Damozel (1910)
- Paris By Night as Orlof Sleuthski (1904–05)
- The Girl and the Governor (Circa 1907/08)
- The Firefly (1912) as Herr Franz
- Marie-Odile as Sergeant Otto Beck (1915)
- Arms and the Girl (originally titled A Delicate Situation)(1916) as General Klaus
- Princess Tra-La-La (1916)
- Some Daddy (1918)
