= Miss Dolly Dollars =

Musical comedy by Harry B. Smith and Victor Herbert

Miss Dolly Dollars is a musical comedy written in two acts with the book and lyrics by Harry B. Smith and music by Victor Herbert. The musical concerns a wealthy American girl in Europe, who is sought after by bankrupt aristocrats. Its score includes a few famous songs such as "A Woman is Only a Woman (But a Good Cigar is a Smoke)".

After a tryout in Rochester, New York, the musical opened at the Knickerbocker Theatre in New York City, on September 4, 1905. It was produced by Charles B. Dillingham and directed by Al Holbrook, with music direction by Antonio DeNovellis. The scenic design was by Homer Emens and Edward G. Unitt, and costumes were by Caroline Seidle. The show soon transferred to the New Amsterdam Theatre on October 16, 1905. It ran for a total of 56 performances.

== Synopsis ==
Setting: A Villa on the Thames at Henley and the Garden of a Hotel in Paris

Wealthy Dorothy Gay, an American girl, is pursued while in Europe, by a number of penniless aristocrats, but she does not wish to marry simply for a title. A secretary, Finney Doolittle, is mistaken for his wealthy English Lord. Dorothy's father, Samuel, urges her to marry the phony Lord Burlingham, but she prefers a man whom she takes to be poor, but who is actually the English nobleman, and all ends happily.

== Cast ==
The opening night cast was as follows:

- Beatrice Anderson - Matilda
- John Ardizone - Duke de Bolero
- Leila Benton - Vena Rodriguez
- Charles Bradshaw - Samuel Gay
- Mildred Cecil - Hon. Reggy Chumpley
- Marion Chase - Vera Vane
- Carter DeHaven - Guy Gay
- Elizabeth Doddridge - Hon. Algy Sydney
- Elsie Ferguson - Celeste
- Joseph Frohoff - First Bailiff
- Lulu Glaser - Dorothy Gay
- Minerva Hall - Jane
- Sidney A. Harris - H'Alfred/ Prince Umskyvitch
- Carl Hartberg - Baron von Rheinheister
- Ralph C. Herz - Finney Doolittle
- Queenie Hewlitt - Millicent
- Bessie Holbrook - Hon. Montague Bank
- Edward Leahy - Captain Sheridan Barry
- James Leahy - The Marquis de Baccarat
- Helen Marlborough - Ruth Delamere
- Olive Murray - Bertha Billings
- William Naughton - The Hon. Percy Fitzboodle
- Byron Ongley - Miggs
- Enrico Oremonte - Count Chianti/ Bobby
- Susanne Parker - Miriam Odell
- Carrie Perkins - Mrs. Gay
- Sadie Probst - Hon. Mayland Bank
- James Reany - Count Runoffsky
- Aline Redmond - Greta Giltedge
- Elsa Reinhardt - Freda Dressler
- L. F. Sampson - Second Bailiff
- Lillian Spencer - Margery
- Melville Stuart - Lord Burlingham
- Lillie Van Arsdale - 'Arriet
- Henry Vogel - Lieutenant von Richter
- Vida Whitmore - Estelle DeLange
- Gladys Zell - Vashti

== Musical numbers ==
Act I

- The Self-Made Family (She's a Lady with Money) – Mrs. Gay, Samuel Gay and Guy Gay
- An Educated Fool (It Keeps Me Guessing All the Time) – Finney Doolittle
- Just Get Out and Walk – Dorothy Gay and Chorus
- An American Heiress – Dorothy and Noblemen
- Dolly Dollars – Guy
- My Fair Unknown – Lord Burlingham

Act II

- It's All in the Book You Know – Dorothy and Lieutenant von Richter
- Life's a Masquerade – Mrs. Gay, Samuel, Celeste and Guy
- The Moth and the Moon – Dorothy and Chorus
- Walks – Guy and Girls
- A Woman Is Only a Woman, But a Good Cigar is a Smoke (Puff, Puff, Puff) – Lord Burlingham
- (American Music) 'Tis Better Than Old Parsifal to Me – Principals and Chorus
- Queen of the Ring – Dorothy and Chorus
