= Audrey Maple =

American actress and vaudeville performer

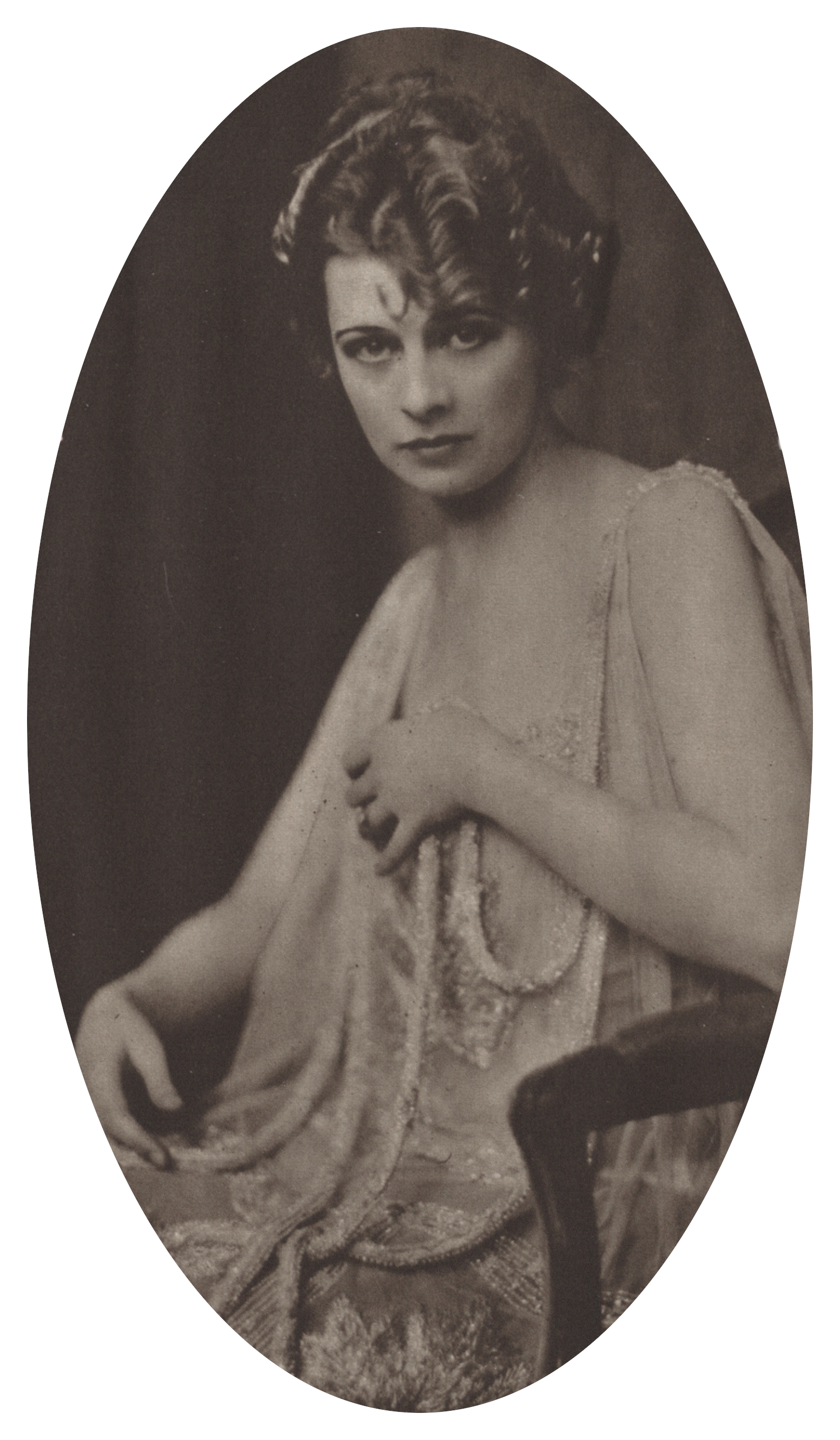
- Maple c.1917
- Born: Elsie H. Schroeder; 1899; Trenton, New Jersey, U.S.
- Died: April 18, 1971 (aged 71–72); New York City, U.S.
- Occupation: Actress
- Years active: 1908–1940
- Spouse: Ernest A. Zadig (m. 1940)

Audrey Maple (born Elsie H. Schroeder; 1899 – April 18, 1971) was an American actress, singer, and vaudeville performer.

== Early life ==
Audrey Maple was born Elsie H. Schroeder in Trenton, New Jersey. Her father was a musician.

== Career ==
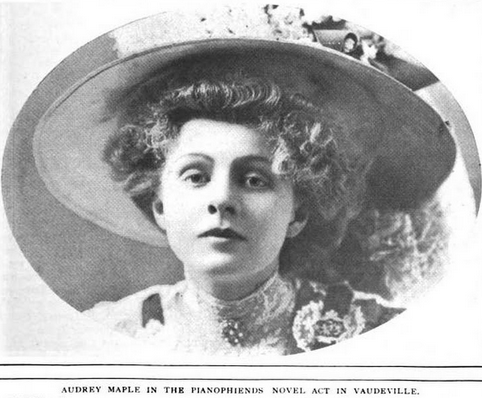
Audrey Maple, from a 1907 publication.

Audrey Maple performed in vaudeville in a novelty act called Pianophiends. In the operetta The Love Waltz (1908-1909), she was half of a highly publicized "eight-minute kiss" during a dance scene.

She appeared in Broadway productions, mostly musical comedies, including The Arcadians (1910), The Firefly (1912-1913), Molly O (1916), Katinka (1916), Good Night, Paul (1917), Her Regiment by Victor Herbert (1917), Monte Cristo Jr. (1919), Tangerine (1921-1922), Princess April (1924), Naughty Riquette (1926), My Princess (1927), Sunny Days (1928), Angela (1928-1929), and The Street Singer (1929-1930).

Maple appeared in two films, The Plumbers are Coming (1929) and Enlighten Thy Daughter (1934).

== Personal life ==
Maple's personal life involved enough gossip, scandal, and legal entanglements to prompt commentary in newspapers: "What again! It's perfectly terrible the way wives pick on poor little Audrey Maple, the pretty musical comedy star, and try to make out that she is a naughty girl." In 1928 she survived a car accident in Chicago that killed one of her co-stars, dancer Rosalie Claire.

In 1940, Audrey Maple married engineer and inventor Ernest A. Zadig, and retired from the stage. She died in New York in 1971, aged 72 years.
