= The Peasant Girl =

Operetta in three acts with music by Oskar Nedbal

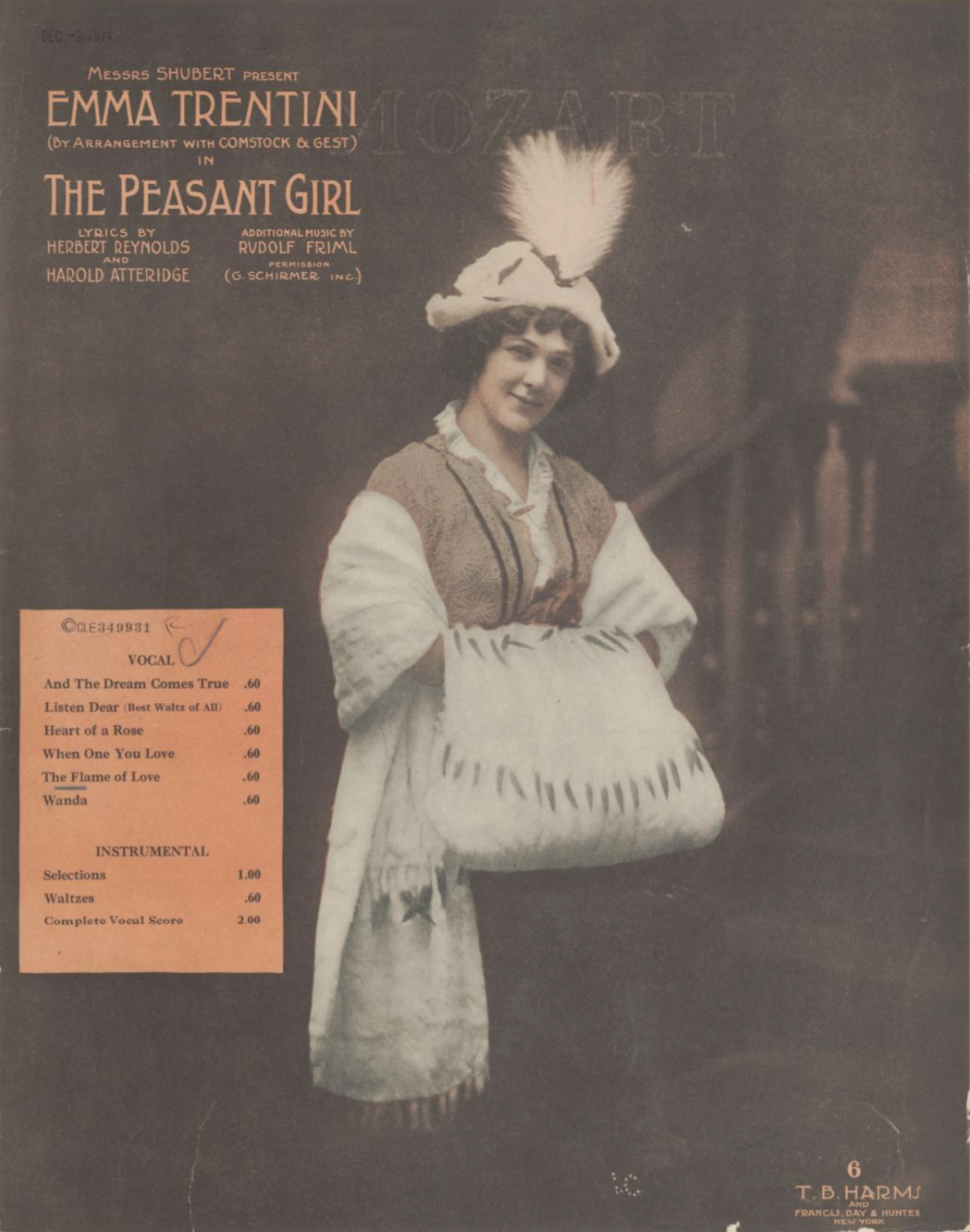
Front cover of 1914 sheet music from The Peasant Girl. Emma Trentini is pictured.

The Peasant Girl is an operetta in three acts with music by Oskar Nedbal. The work is an English-language adaptation of Nedbal's German-language operetta Polenblut which was in turn adapted from Alexander Pushkin's short story "Mistress into Maid" (also known as "The Squire's Daughter) from The Belkin Tales by librettist Leo Stein. Edgar Smith wrote the book to this adaptation and new lyrics were co-written by Herbert Reynolds and Harold Atteridge. Some new music was also included by composers Rudolf Friml and Clifton Crawford. Crawford also provided some additional lyrics in addition to starring in the show as Bronio Von Popiel opposite soprano Emma Trentini in the title role. The operetta was originally titled The Ballet Girl, but at the request of Trentini, it was renamed The Peasant Girl shortly before its premiere in 1914.

Because of World War I, Smith purposefully removed the original setting of Polenblut and positioned the work in an unnamed country in Europe sometime during the 19th century so as to remove the audience from associations with the ongoing conflict overseas. The story was also largely changed in order to feature Trentini's gift for comedy.

== Performance history ==
Produced by the Shubert brothers in collaboration with F. Ray Comstock and Morris Gest, The Peasant Girl premiered on November 16, 1914 at the Teck Theatre in Buffalo, New York. It subsequently toured in November and December 1914 to the Garrick Theatre in Detroit, the Alvin Theater in Pittsburgh, the Colonial Theater in Cleveland, and the Lyric Theatre in Philadelphia. In January 1915 the production was in residence at the Shubert Theatre in Boston, It left there in February 1915 for performances at the Court Square Theater in Springfield, Massachusetts followed by a short run at Parsons Theatre in Connecticut.

The Peasant Girl opened on Broadway at the 44th Street Theatre on Mar 2, 1915. It ran there for a total of 111 performances; closing on June 5, 1915. The production was co-directed by J. C. Huffman and J. H. Benrimo, and choreographed by Jack Mason. It used costumes designed by Melville Ellis and sets designed by the Ackerman Brothers. The cast was led by Emma Trentini as Helena (aka "The Peasant Girl") and Clifton Crawford as Bronio Von Popiel. Others in the cast included John Charles Thomas as Count Bolo Baranski, Ernest Hare as Von Mirski, Letty Yorke as Wanda Kwadinskaja, Ethel Houston as Jadwiga Pawlowa, Francis J. Boyle as Pan Jan Zaremba, Henry Mack as Wlatek, Charles Guidon as Von Gorski, Stanley Henry as Von Senovica, Frances Pritchard as Celeste, Lucille Blair as Baroness Petroffski, Edith Kingdon Hallor as Countess Napolska, and Karen Krischner as Fraulein Drygalska.

Trentini began a romantic affair with Friml during the run of The Peasant Girl which proved disruptive and led to Friml's firing.
