= Italian Street Song =

Song

"Italian Street Song" is a popular song written by Victor Herbert (music) and Rida Johnson Young (lyrics) in 1910.

The song was written for and introduced in the operetta Naughty Marietta, which premiered in Syracuse, New York on October 24, 1910, sung by Emma Trentini.

Italian Street Song
Recorded by Lucy Gates in 1916

At the final gala performance of the operetta's national tour at Harlem's West End Theatre, Trentini refused an encore of "Italian Street Song" despite Herbert's repeated cues. He stormed out of the pit and refused to ever write for her again. In 1910, Lucy Isabelle Marsh recorded "Italian Street Song".

Since 1935, the song has been most closely associated with Jeanette MacDonald, who played the lead role of Marietta in the Metro-Goldwyn-Mayer film version of the operetta released that year. The song proved to be one of her most popular; she recorded it multiple times throughout her lifetime, and she often performed it during concerts and radio appearances for the rest of her career. Her recording of the song was released as RCA Victor 78 RPM single #10-1134-A with an orchestra conducted by Maximilian Pilzer.

== Cover versions and references in popular culture ==
Billy May recorded a Latin-styled version of the piece for his 1954 album Naughty Operetta! The recording was later included on Capitol's Ultra-Lounge Internet-only album "Ciao Bella!"

The children's novel Zizzy Zing by Ursula Dubosarsky takes its name from a line of The Italian Street Song, which is played on a record by one of the characters.

It was performed on Sesame Street by Plácido Flamingo, accompanied by an orchestra of animals making musical versions of their noises, conducted by Seiji Ozawa.
