= Naughty Marietta (operetta) =

1910 comic opera by Rida Johnson Young and Victor Herbert

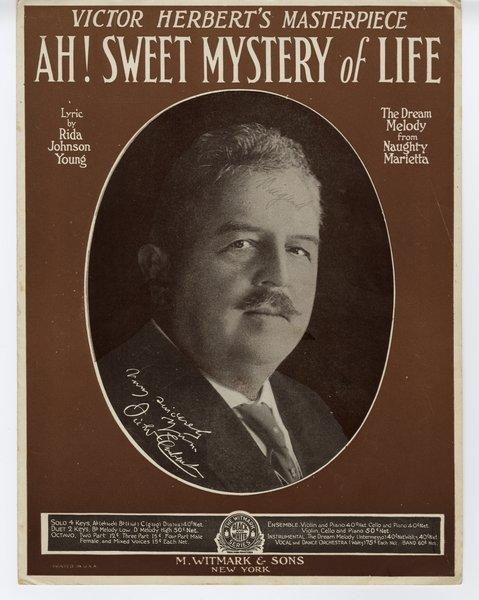
- Sheet music cover
- Music: Victor Herbert
- Lyrics: Rida Johnson Young
- Book: Rida Johnson Young
- Productions: 1910 Broadway; 1929 Broadway; 1931 Broadway

Naughty Marietta is an operetta in two acts, with libretto by Rida Johnson Young and music by Victor Herbert, written as a vehicle for Emma Trentini and produced by Oscar Hammerstein I. Set in 18th century New Orleans, it tells how Captain Richard Warrington is commissioned to unmask and capture a notorious French pirate calling himself "Bras Pique". Warrington is helped and hindered by a high-spirited runaway, Contessa Marietta. The score includes several well-known songs, including "Ah! Sweet Mystery of Life".

After a tryout in October 1910, in Syracuse, New York, it opened on Broadway in November to mostly strong reviews, ran for 136 performances and then toured. The operetta was revived on Broadway in 1929 and 1931 and has been adapted for film and television and recorded several times. It has been called Herbert's masterpiece and the first true American operetta.

== Background ==
By 1910, the success of Oscar Hammerstein I's Manhattan Opera House had threatened the Metropolitan Opera's business enough that they paid him $1.2 million not to produce grand opera in New York City for a decade. Hammerstein turned his focus to light opera, first commissioning Hans, the Flautist from Louis Ganne. It sold so well that the Manhattan Opera House was not available for Hammerstein's next light opera, which would be composed by Victor Herbert. Ironically, he had to rent his old Olympia Theatre, which he had sold in bankruptcy to A. L. Erlanger and Marc Klaw. That theatre had struggled to find a profitable tenant.

Hammerstein hired Rida Johnson Young to write the book for Herbert's new operetta. She was a lyricist for M. Witmark & Sons, which later published Herbert's score for Naughty Marietta. The creative team hoped to achieve the success of The Merry Widow, which had been a sensation in Europe and New York a few years earlier. The operetta was originally titled "Little Paris", after the nickname for New Orleans. The costume designer insisted on shifting the period of the show forward 25 years from 1750 to 1775 even though, by then, Louisiana had reverted to Spain, and the American revolutionary war had begun.

The part that Herbert wrote for Marietta is so long and difficult that Emma Trentini, who created the role, felt it was more taxing than the title role in Aida.

== Synopsis ==
=== Act I ===
In the 18th century in New Orleans' Place d'Armes, vendors are hawking their wares ("Clear Away!"). They believe the fountain is haunted by the ghost of a woman who was killed by the pirate Bras Pique. Étienne Grandet, the son of the territory's lieutenant governor, is secretly the pirate and has been attacking ships bound for New Orleans. Étienne's father shares in his profits, and his quadroon slave mistress Adah knows Étienne's secret.

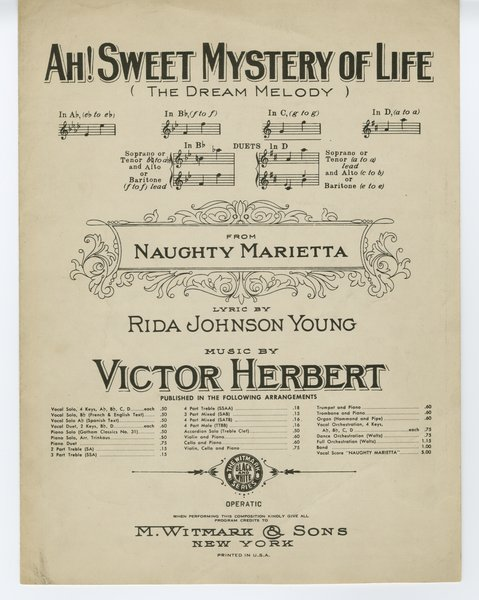
Sheet music cover to "Ah! Sweet Mystery of Life"

Captain Dick Warrington and Sir Harry Blake lead a band of locals into the square vowing to capture Bras Pique ("Tramp, Tramp, Tramp"). Lieutenant Governor Grandet holds them off to assist Étienne's scheme to establish a breakaway Louisiana dictatorship under his own command. Captain Dick's men are also excited about the arrival of marriageable casquette girls that the King of France has sent ("Taisez-Vous"). Plain-looking Lizette latches on to the boastful Simon O'Hara, Captain Dick's Jewish servant.

When the square clears, a fragment of the ghost's song comes from the fountain ("Mysterious Melody"). The singer is actually "Naughty Marietta", a casquette girl who escaped from her ship. Captain Dick, who had met her in Mozambique, agrees to hide her at the marionette theatre, where she poses as the son of the puppeteer Rudolfo. The captain insists he cannot love Marietta ("It Never, Never Can Be Love"). Marietta tells him that she will love the man who can complete the melodic fragment she dreamed up. Dick refuses her request to complete it but finds himself whistling it later.

Simon tries to impress Lizette ("If I Were Anyone Else but Me"). Worried that Étienne does not love her, Adah tries to divine her future ("'Neath a Southern Moon"). Marietta performs at Rudolfo's theatre ("Italian Street Song").

The King offers a reward for the return of the missing Contessa d'Altena, who hid among the casquette girls. She is known to sing a tune that the townfolk recognize as the ghost melody. Blake accidentally ruins Marietta's disguise. She insists she is not the Contessa and, during a scuffle between Étienne's and Dick's men, runs away with Rudolfo.

=== Act II ===
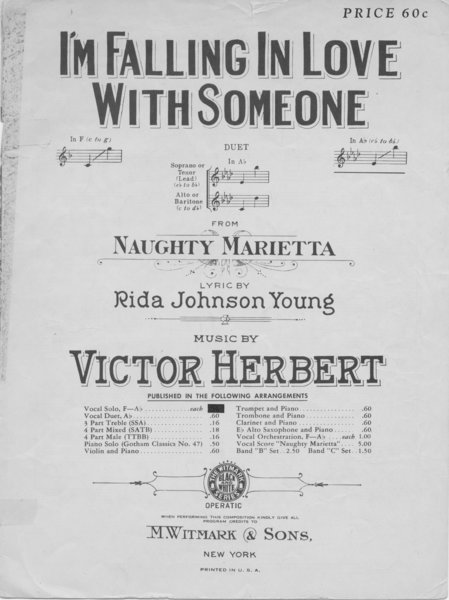
Sheet music cover to "I'm Falling in Love with Someone"

Marietta learns Rudolfo's craft ("Dance of the Marionettes"). Étienne believes she is the Contessa and woos her ("You Marry a Marionette"); a marriage to a contessa would legitimize his plan for a Louisiana.

The decadence of New Orleans is displayed at a quadroon ball ("New Orleans, Jeunesse Dorèe" and "The Loves of New Orleans"). Lizette pines for a husband ("The Sweet By-and-By"). Simon hopes to complete the Contessa's song and marry her, and he ignores Lizette. Marietta is shocked by the ball's immorality: drinking, gambling and womanizing. Captain Dick arrives to protect her, but thinks he has been flirting with Adah, and so she dances with Étienne ("Live for Today"), who proposes to her. She asks Étienne about Adah, and he says he will auction her. Marietta seeks out Dick, who realizes his feelings for her ("I'm Falling in Love with Someone").

Étienne auctions Adah, and Dick buys her. Marietta jealously agrees to marry Étienne and reveals she is Contessa d'Altena. Dick sets Adah free, and she offers to help him reveal Étienne as Bras Pique.

Simon revels in the ease of his new job as the Grandet's whipping boy ("It's Pretty Soft for Simon"), but when Dick fingers Étienne as Bras Pique, Simon is obligated to take the punishment. Adah tells Marietta of Étienne's pirate identity, and so she refuses to marry him. When the lieutenant governor locks her up, she hears a voice outside completing her dream song ("Ah, Sweet Mystery of Life"). It is Dick, whose men are not far behind. Dick and Marietta sing the finished song together. Étienne relinquishes his claim on Marietta, and Dick allows the pirates to escape without harm.

== Musical numbers ==
Act I

- Overture
- 1. Clear Away! – Opening Chorus
- 2. Mysterious Melody - Fanchon
- 3. Tramp, Tramp, Tramp – Captain Dick and Followers
- 4. Taisez-Vous – Casquette Girls and Men
- 5. Naughty Marietta – Marietta
- 6. It Never, Never Can Be Love – Marietta and Captain Dick
- 7. If I Were Anybody Else But Me – Lizette and Simon
- 8. 'Neath the Southern Moon – Adah
- 9. Italian Street Song – Marietta and Chorus
- 10. Finale

Act II

- 11. Dance of the Marionettes – Marietta and Rudolfo
- 12. You Marry a Marionette – Etienne
- 13. Intermezzo: Dance – Marietta
- 14. The Dream Melody (Ah! Sweet Mystery of Life)
- 15. New Orleans Jeunesse Dorèe– Chorus of Men
- 16. Loves of New Orleans – Ensemble
- 17. The Sweet By and By – Lizette
- 18. Prelude to live for Today - Orchestra
- 19. Live For To-Day – Marietta, Adah, Captain Dick and Etienne
- 20. I'm Falling In Love With Some One – Captain Dick
- 21. It's Pretty Soft for Simon – Simon
- 22. Finale

== Roles and original cast ==
- Captain Richard Warrington – Orville Harrold
- Lieutenant Governor Grandet – William Frederic
- Etienne Grandet, Son of Lieut. Governor – Edward Martindel
- Sir Harry Blake, An Irish Adventurer – Raymond Bloomer
- Simon O'hara, Capt. Dick's Servant – Harry Cooper
- Rudolfo, Keeper of Marionette Theatre – James S. Murray
- Florenze, Sec'y to Lieut. Governor – Howard Morgan
- Lizette, A Casquette Girl – Kate Elinore
- Adah, A Quadroon – Maria Duchêne
- The Voodoo Queen – Viola Ellis
- Nanette, Felice, Fanchon, Graziella and Franchesca – Louise Aichel, Blanche Lipton, Vera De Rosa, Sylvia Loti and Bessie Ricardo
- Marietta D'Altena – Emma Trentini

== Productions ==
Naughty Marietta had its first performance at Wieting Opera House on October 24, 1910, in Syracuse, New York. It was such a hit that hundreds of people had to be turned away. Hammerstein sought to maximize profits with eight shows a week, instead of six. Trentini could not perform that many, and they compromised on a seventh as a Wednesday matinee. The show then moved to Buffalo, where Herbert conducted the first half of the show on October 31 before leaving for Chicago.

The show's Broadway premiere on November 7, 1910, at the New York Theatre, was "a brilliant success". After the first act, the premiere audience would not stop applauding until Hammerstein took a bow from his box. Ticket prices ranged from 25¢ to $2.00, and grosses averaged $20,000 a week. It ran for 136 performances. The initial run was directed by Jacques Coini and conducted by Gaetano Merola and later William Axt.

Naughty Marietta then went on tour with Trentini in the lead and Herbert often conducting, passing first to the Montauk Theatre in Brooklyn on the Subway Circuit. Trentini found performing the matinees in addition to the evening shows too taxing, and in Indianapolis, she finally insisted that she would not continue in the role unless they were canceled. She would often cut numbers to save her voice. At the tour's final gala performance at Harlem's West End Theatre, she refused an encore of "Italian Street Song" despite Herbert's repeated cues. He stormed out of the pit and refused to ever write for Trentini again.

The operetta enjoyed revivals in 1929 at Jolson's 59th Street Theatre and in 1931 at Erlanger's Theatre.

== Reception ==
A review in The Buffalo News enthused, "Naughty Marietta is fully up to the Herbert standard, if it does not surpass his other productions." They also praised Young's libretto for providing the comic opera with a genuine story rather than limpid prompts for songs: "many of the situations are really original and funny ... [Young] has set a mark for those who come after her."

The New York Times wrote that the Broadway premiere audience was so enthusiastic it seemed "the roof would come down" and called for Orville Harrold to perform four encores of "I'm Falling in Love with Some One". The New-York Tribune noted that the applause for Trentini and Harrold "rocked the house" and had high praise for Herbert's score as "far and away better than anything he has written of late years. ... America wishes more such music from Mr. Herbert." Brooklyn Citizen's reviewer wrote that the performers made "New York their debtors".

A Brooklyn Daily Times critic loved Coini's direction and Merola's conducting; the critic called Herbert "the Massenet of the world of lighter music", praising him for working wonders with a book and lyrics that "defy description and it would be a waste of time to describe either." The Sun's critic wrote that Hammerstein had "a score made to order by Victor Herbert" for Emma Trentini. Though the libretto "was of no great note", he felt the show "ought to stay in town for a long time". By its second week, The Sun asserted, "It is unanimously conceded that this production establishes a new standard for comic opera from every point of consideration."

A review in The Theatre Magazine sniffed, "The less said about the book of this opera the better. It is simply stupid and will interrupt no one’s drowsing. This is the weak spot – that and the fact that the comedy introduced is far, far below the level of the rest of the work. It is vulgar at times, and not funny at its best." However, its praise for the music was unreserved, calling it "comic opera in true grand opera style" and praising Trentini's voice as a bird "that soars to endless heights".

According to Herbert's biographer Neil Gould, among others, Naughty Marietta is considered the composer's most famous stage work and the first true American operetta. It has been called his masterpiece and "one of the richest musical scores for the American stage".

== Recordings ==
Selections from Naughty Marietta were already being released by Victor during its original Broadway run. In November and December 1910, "I'm Falling in Love with Someone" was covered by John Barnes Wells, Harry Macdonough and Evan Williams. Lucy Isabelle Marsh recorded "Italian Street Song". By the summer of 1911, Victor Herbert's Orchestra was recording selections from the operetta and releasing medleys like "Gems from Naughty Marietta". His 1911 recording of "The Dream Melody Intermezzo" (Blue Amberol Records #1775) is included in the National Recording Registry.

In 1950, Columbia Records released an abridged soundtrack with Nelson Eddy and Nadine Conner conducted by Robert Armbruster. RCA Victor issued a highlights recording of Naughty Marietta using studio singers and Al Goodman's orchestra. RCA Victor's Show Time Series featured Mademoiselle Modiste and Naughty Marietta on a 1953 album with Felix Knight and Doretta Morrow.

A Capitol Records album starring Gordon MacRae was issued as part of a series of recordings based on MacRae's popular Railroad Hour program, which featured potted operettas and musicals. The first release was a 10-inch LP, later reissued on one side of a 12-inch LP with The Red Mill on the reverse. In 1963, Reader's Digest condensed Naughty Marietta on side 2 of the 4th disc in their 9-LP Treasury of Great Operettas.

A complete recording was finally released in 1981 by the Smithsonian Collection in a 2-LP box set. In 2001, Ohio Light Opera released a live recording of a performance of the operetta, including dialogue, on Albany Records.

== Adaptations ==
A film version of Naughty Marietta was released by MGM in 1935 starring Jeanette MacDonald and Nelson Eddy. The pairing was so successful that MacDonald and Eddy starred in several more operetta films together. An abridged TV version of the operetta was broadcast live in the United States on January 15, 1955, starring Patrice Munsel and Alfred Drake, as part of Max Liebman Presents.

== Cultural influence ==
Both the operetta and its title song are lampooned by the song "Naughty, Naughty Nancy" in the 1959 musical Little Mary Sunshine. "Ah! Sweet Mystery of Life" is used as a recurring gag in the 1974 film Young Frankenstein. "Ah! Sweet Mystery of Life" and "I'm Falling in Love with Someone" are included in the score of the musical Thoroughly Modern Millie.

The musical is used as a way of torturing a captured rebel in the 1971 Woody Allen movie Bananas. In the 1954 I Love Lucy episode "Ricky's Movie Offer", "Ah! Sweet Mystery of Life" is sung by Elizabeth Patterson; in the 1973 All In the Family episode "Archie The Gambler", the song is sung by Jean Stapleton, Rob Reiner, and Sally Struthers; and in the 1990 Designing Women episode "Pearls of Wisdom", Dixie Carter sings the song. In 1983, Fantasy Island (season 6, episode 9) adapted the musical with Dorothy Hamill as Marietta and Lorenzo Lamas as Richard Warrington.

In 1974, a short story by Roald Dahl titled "Ah! Sweet Mystery of Life, at Last I've Found Thee" was published in The New York Times. The story provided the title for a 1989 anthology of Dahl's work.
