= Herbert Reynolds (lyricist) =

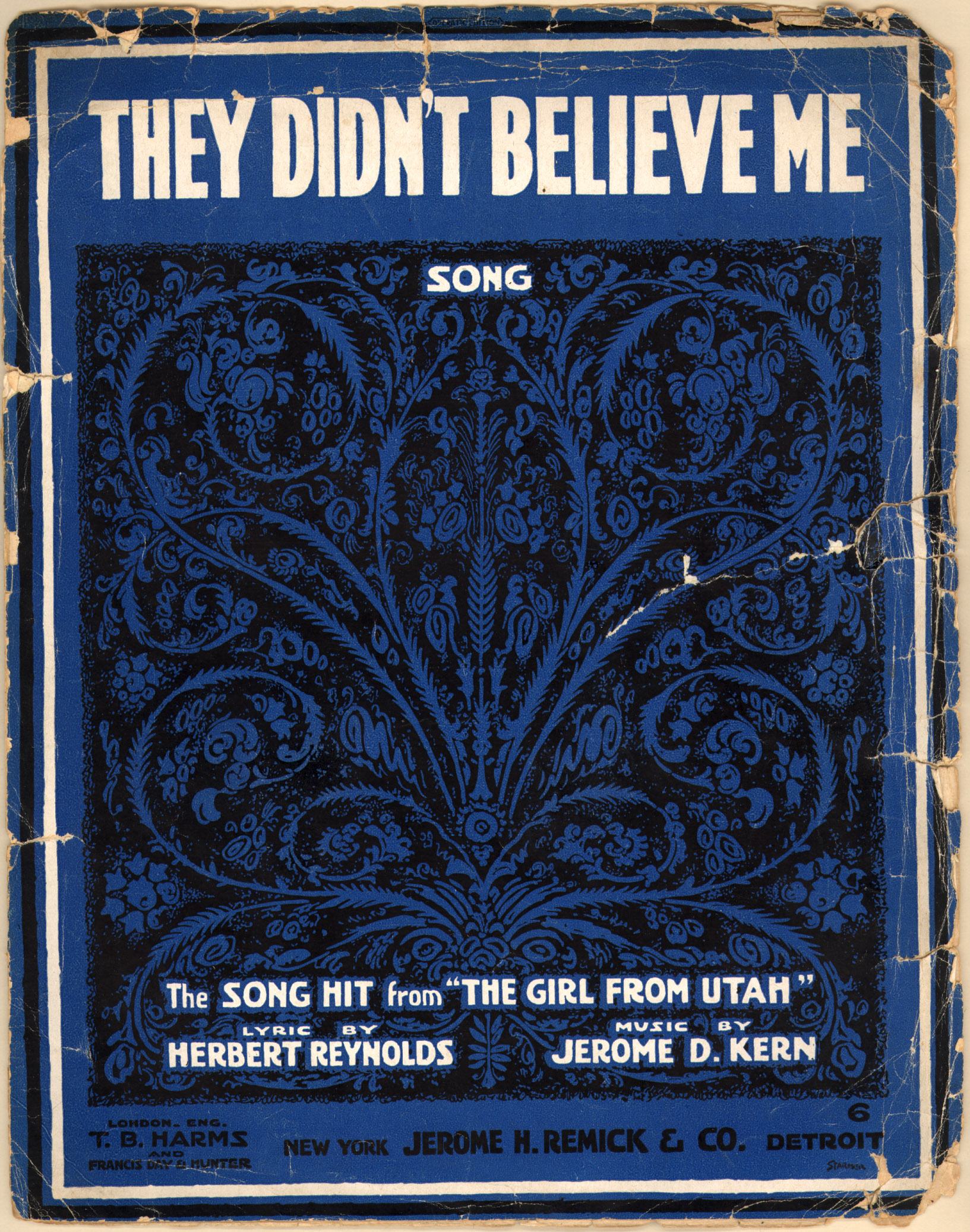
Sheet music cover of "They Didn't Believe Me" (1914)

Michael Elder Rourke (14 July 1867 – 26 August 1933), who assumed the pen name Herbert Reynolds in 1913, was an Irish-American lyricist. Reynolds wrote the lyrics to Jerome Kern's first big hit, "They Didn't Believe Me", interpolated into the 1914 American version of The Girl from Utah, produced by Charles Frohman. The show had a successful run of 140 performances at the Knickerbocker Theatre, opening on August 14, 1914. Frohman had hired the young Kern to write five new songs for the score together with Reynolds to strengthen what he felt was a weak first act. Julia Sanderson and Donald Brian starred in the production.

With Harold Atteridge he co-wrote the lyrics to The Peasant Girl (1914). He shared the lyric writing with P. G. Wodehouse in Miss Springtime (1916), with additional music by Kern.

Reynolds went on to collaborate with Kern and several other lyricists on the Broadway musical Very Good Eddie with a book by Guy Bolton and Philip Bartholomae, and again in Rock-a-Bye Baby (1918).
