= Craig Campbell (BMX rider) =

British BMX rider and disc jockey

Personal information
- Full name: Craig Campbell
- Nickname: Camps
- Born: 16 July 1969 (age 57) Essex, England

Cycling career
- Sport: Cycling
- Current team: Retired
- Discipline: BMX
- Role: Rider
- Rider type: Freestyle

Professional teams
- 1983?-: Haro
- ?: Skyway
- ?: Pro-Lite
- ?: Bully
- ?-1990: GT

Craig Campbell (born 16 July 1969, Essex) is a retired British freestyle BMX rider and disc jockey.

Widely regarded as one of the pioneers of the freestyle era in the 1980s, he was one of the first European riders to compete on American soil. Since retiring at an early age of twenty one in 1991, he established himself as a disc jockey.

== Biography ==
Born near Southend, Essex; Campbell first came to attention in 1983 when Bob Haro, needing a British rider to represent his company, noticed Campbell's performance at a competition taking place at Harrow Skate Park thus sponsoring him in the process, making him the first non-American rider to receive a full sponsorship by Haro, resulting in Campbell's sudden popularity.

Throughout his career, he have won a number of titles, amongst those are the UK King of the Skatepark in 1984 and the UKBFA British Pro Freestyle Champion in 1985. He also was one of the first European riders to compete in the United States and was the first to experiment with the Rocket Air on a BMX bike in 1986 after seeing Christian Hosoi performing it on a skateboard, although Ron Wilkerson was stated by some source to being the pioneer, though he popularised the move. He is also credited for revolutionising the 540 wallride, again on a BMX bike during a 2hip event in 1988.

In 1985, his association with Pro-Lite led him to get his own signature frame, built by Freewheeler, it became the best selling freestyle bike of the year, outselling its following two rivals.

In 1987, Campbell, now without a sponsor, was spending a year working in a sound mixing studio, producing soundtracks for TV commercials. Realising that his friend, Jess Dyrenforth, was in the United States getting paid to ride on shows, that prompted Campbell and his friends Nick Phillip and Lee Reynolds to move there to further their BMX career in the following year.

In 1991, as his contract with GT came to an end, he returned to the United Kingdom. As he was finding difficulty in making a living from freestyle BMX as well as a growing interest in music meant he retired in 1991 at the age of twenty one, where he established a career as a disc jockey.
