= Emma Trentini =

American opera singer

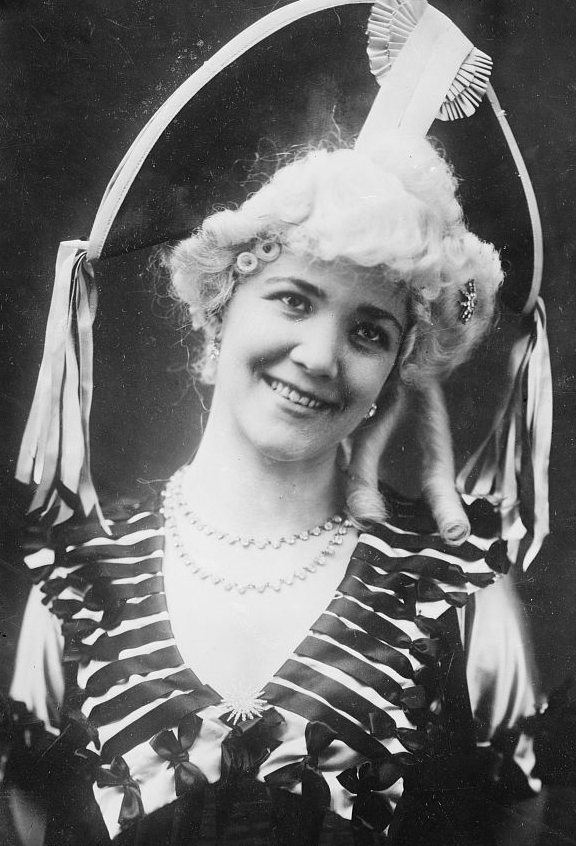
Emma Trentini in 1906.

Emma Trentini (1878 – March 23, 1959) was an Italian soprano opera singer who came to the United States in December 1906.

== Early life ==
She was born in Mantua, Italy. Her parents were poor and could not afford to give her money to attain an operatic career. At the age of 12 she was welcomed into the church choir of Mantua. A fund was raised and her mother consented to allow her to go away and study with the renowned Lombardi. She obtained a place at the Teatro alla Scala in Milan at the age of 14.

She studied there for four years and toured Europe as a performer between seasons. During her travels she met Australian soprano Dame Nellie Melba, who recommended Trentini to Oscar Hammerstein, who was in Paris at the time. Trentini sang for Hammerstein in Brussels, and she was given a five-year contract.

== Grand opera singer ==
She performed as a singer with Hammerstein at the Manhattan Opera House, which was built by Hammerstein and opened in 1906. The original opera house still stands at 34th Street.

When she came to America she spoke only Italian. Trentini studied English by repeating words and phrases over and over.

In February 1907, Trentini wore the clothing of an old woman in a production of the comic opera Il Barbiere di Siviglia by Gioachino Rossini. In March she appeared in her first true role in America at the Manhattan Opera House, performing the part of Musetta in La Bohème.

The same month she became ill for several weeks after going on stage with Nellie Melba and Emma Calvé, against the advice of her physician. Trentini made her return in Carmen, which she entered during the second act on April 17. She played the minor role of one of the women smugglers. Trentini continued to play minor roles further into her career.

During her second season at the Manhattan she was drafted to perform the part of Antonia in Les contes d'Hoffmann. She could not speak French but volunteered to learn the role. The following summer she resided in a house in Southern France and became fluent in the language.

Claude Debussy heard her sing Yniold in Pelléas et Mélisande at Covent Garden in London. He was enthusiastic and inscribed a photo to mon toute petite Yniold. He also heard her sing in Proseperine by Camille Saint-Saëns.

Among her more noteworthy roles are performances as Violetta in La Traviata, Nedda in Pagliacci, and Gilda in Rigoletto. She appeared in many Italian cities and Cairo. Under Hammerstein's management she sang roles in Un ballo in maschera, Louise, Les contes d'Hoffmann, Thaïs, and "Pelléas et Mélisande".

In Les contes d'Hoffmann she played three characters by an odd turn of events. Trentini was depicting two people when Italian soprano Lina Cavalieri became ill and could not make an evening performance. Hammerstein phoned Trentini and told her the situation. She asked that Cavalieri's part be sent to her. Within one hour of rehearsing she became letter perfect and she sang three roles that night.

== Comic opera ==
The New York Times interviewed her in September 1910 at her West 10th Street apartment. She was in the company of Victor Herbert, with whom she was preparing the music of a new part. Hammerstein wanted to change her from a grand opera singer to comic opera vocalist. When he suggested this she confessed to the writer that she cried for two days. Others followed Hammerstein's lead in wanting Trentini to make the transition. She reconsidered, exclaiming that it would be very nice to be the étoile-une toute petite étoile. In English, she meant she believed she could excel as a singular star of comic opera rather than one of many in grand opera.

The English language continued to be a problem for her, though she took eighty lessons in a single season the previous winter. The difficulty was more pronounced in comic opera which lacked the music to assist a performer. Trentini had never spoken lines at this point in her opera career. Herbert's comic opera, Naughty Marietta (1910), was set in New Orleans in 1750. In the second act Trentini was given an opportunity to portray a boy. The opera was adapted from a book by Rita Johnson Young.

The debut of Naughty Marietta was at the Bowery Theatre on November 7, 1910. Trentini and Orville Harrold appeared in 136 performances before the production was taken on the road. A dispute between Herbert and Trentini arose when Herbert requested that Trentini perform an encore of the Italian Street Song. Trentini ignored him because she wished to save her voice for the rest of the performance.

The feud between Herbert and Trentini gave composer Rudolf Friml his first big opportunity. Herbert refused to work with Trentini so Friml joined with Otto Harbach to compose The Firefly (1912) for Trentini. Friml said of Trentini in September 1970: Smartest singer I ever met. She never talked or sang out loud and when she did it was always one octave lower. She saved her full voice for a real audience. In 1914-1915 she starred in the title role of The Peasant Girl.

== Private life ==
Opera tenor Enrico Caruso wooed Trentini for sixteen months after which she vowed to marry him in 1911. A portion of their courtship occurred in Rimini. Later, Trentini was named as a co-respondent in Friml's divorce from his first wife in 1915, and evidence was introduced that they were having an affair.

Emma Trentini died in 1959.
