= List of The Tonight Show Starring Johnny Carson episodes (1965) =

- No. of episodes: 258

Release
- Original network: NBC

Season chronology
- ← Previous; 1964 episodes Next → 1966 episodes

The following is a list of episodes of the television series The Tonight Show Starring Johnny Carson which aired in 1965. In October, 1962 Johnny Carson took over as host of the show from the previous host Jack Paar.

== January ==
No.	Original release date	Guest(s)	Musical/entertainment guest(s)
570	January 1, 1965	Buddy Hackett, Jayne Mansfield	Jan Peerce
571	January 4, 1965	Bill Cosby guest host; Jason Robards, Art Carney	Bill Henderson
572	January 5, 1965	Eydie Gorme, The Amazing Randi, Jackie Clark	N/A
573	January 6, 1965	June Allyson, June Valli, fashion designers Vicki Tiel and Mia Fonsagrives	Charles Aznavour
574	January 7, 1965	Al Capp, Stefanie Powers, Lester Rand	Jerry Vale
575	January 8, 1965	Cornel Wilde, Jean Wallace, Terry-Thomas, Roger Conklin	Frankie Randall
576	January 11, 1965	Henry Morgan, Nobu McCarthy, author H. R. Hays	N/A
Toni Arden.
577	January 12, 1965	TBA	N/A
578	January 13, 1965	Gore Vidal, Milt Kamen	N/A
579	January 14, 1965	Allan Sherman, Phyllis Newman	Artie Shaw
580	January 15, 1965	Eydie Gorme, Mel Brooks, Rod Serling	Chuck Johnson
581	January 18, 1965	Milt Kamen guest host	N/A
582	January 19, 1965	Xavier Cugat, Charo, Cesar Romero	Billy Eckstine
Coverage of Presidential Inaugural Ball preempts The Tonight Show on January 20.
583	January 21, 1965	Al Capp, George Axelrod	N/A
584	January 22, 1965	The Redheads (an all-girl basketball team)	Roy Clark, Barbara Windsor
585	January 25, 1965	Eva Gabor, Robert Merrill, Andrew Lynn	N/A
586	January 26, 1965	Selma Diamond, Adam Keefe, Dr. Richard Evans	Roberta Peters, Mary Lou Williams
587	January 27, 1965	Bette Davis, Sidney Omarr	Erroll Garner, Johnny O'Neill
588	January 28, 1965	Henny Youngman, Kaye Ballard, Jeff Donnell	Joe Williams
589	January 29, 1965	Ed McMahon and Skitch Henderson guest hosts, George Jessel, Richard Tucker	N/A

== February ==
No.	Original release date	Guest(s)	Musical/entertainment guest(s)
590	February 1, 1965	(FROM LOS ANGELES) Bob Hope, Carol Anderson, Sue Raney	The Andrews Sisters
591	February 2, 1965	(FROM LOS ANGELES) Don Adams, William Frawley	N/A
592	February 3, 1965	(FROM LOS ANGELES) Don Rickles, Godfrey Cambridge	N/A
593	February 4, 1965	(FROM LOS ANGELES) Louis Nye, Lorne Greene, Pernell Roberts, Dan Blocker, Michael Landon, Tuesday Weld	N/A
594	February 5, 1965	(FROM LOS ANGELES) George Burns	Johnny Mathis, The Young Americans
595	February 8, 1965	(FROM LOS ANGELES) California Governor Edmund G. Brown, Diana Dors, Lou Holtz (comedian)	Denny Zeitlin
596	February 9, 1965	(FROM LOS ANGELES) Ethel Merman and daughter Ethel Geary, Chuck Maynard, John Bubbles	The Four Freshmen
597	February 10, 1965	(FROM LOS ANGELES) Bob Hope, Abbe Lane	George Shearing
598	February 11, 1965	(FROM LOS ANGELES) Roy Rogers and Dale Evans, Mamie Van Doren	N/A
599	February 12, 1965	(FROM LOS ANGELES) Danny Thomas, Piccola Pupa	N/A
600	February 15, 1965	Woody Allen	Connie Francis
601	February 16, 1965	Joan Crawford, Kaye Ballard, Xavier Cugat, Charo	Connie Haines
602	February 17, 1965	Milt Kamen, Joan Rivers (debut), Ulla Sellert	Julian Bream, Jack Haskell
603	February 18, 1965	Eli Wallach, Anne Jackson, Dorothy Provine	Roy Clark
604	February 19, 1965	Henry Morgan	Kay Starr
605	February 22, 1965	Alan King guest host	N/A
606	February 23, 1965	Woody Allen, James Mason, Luba Lisa	The Romeros
607	February 24, 1965	Eydie Gorme, Phil Foster, psychologist Dr. Rose Franzblau	N/A
608	February 25, 1965	Ethel Merman, Jack E. Leonard, Skip Cunningham, Henry Boyd	N/A
609	February 26, 1965	Bill Cosby, Diahn Williams	Vicki Carr

== March ==
No.	Original release date	Guest(s)	Musical/entertainment guest(s)
610	March 1, 1965	Rose Marie	N/A
611	March 2, 1965	Eva Gabor	N/A
612	March 3, 1965	Joan Rivers	N/A
613	March 4, 1965	Corbett Monica	The New Christy Minstrels
614	March 5, 1965	Selma Diamond, Don Francks, Dr. Ernest Dichter	N/A
615	March 8, 1965	Kaye Ballard, Joe Garagiola	Frankie Laine
616	March 9, 1965	Lee Remick, Alice Ghostley, David Frye	Jan Peerce
617	March 10, 1965	Eydie Gorme, George Jessel, Irwin Corey	N/A
618	March 11, 1965	Bob Hope, Richard Chamberlain, Hedda Hopper, Carol Lawrence, Barbara Parkins, Harve Presnell	N/A
Photoplay Awards are presented.
619	March 12, 1965	Buddy Hackett	The Andrews Sisters
620	March 15, 1965	Milt Kamen, Margaret Whiting, John Bubbles	Neil Wolfe
621	March 16, 1965	Corbett Monica, Nancy Dussault, Phil Ford and Mimi Hines	N/A
622	March 17, 1965	Don Adams	Jane Morgan
623	March 18, 1965	Robert Merrill, Joan Rivers, Jim Fowler	Maureen Thomson
624	March 19, 1965	Alan King guest host	N/A
625	March 22, 1965	Johnny Mathis, Phil Foster, Ruta Lee	Benny Goodman
626	March 23, 1965	Ethel Ennis, Muriel Grosfield	Roy Clark
627	March 24, 1965	Henry Morgan, Robert Murphy, Anita Gillette, Anita Bryant	N/A
628	March 25, 1965	Eydie Gorme	N/A
629	March 26, 1965	Tony Curtis, Larry Storch	Nancy Ames
630	March 29, 1965	Louis Nye, guest host; Vincent Price, Chita Rivera, Charlie Manna	Joe Williams, Anita Gillette
631	March 30, 1965	Frankie Laine, Shari Lewis	Della Reese
632	March 31, 1965	Robert Mitchum, Phyllis Diller	N/A

== April ==
No.	Original release date	Guest(s)	Musical/entertainment guest(s)
633	April 1, 1965	Al Capp	Donna Fuller
634	April 2, 1965	Milt Kamen, Diahn Williams	N/A
635	April 5, 1965	José Ferrer, Kaye Ballard, Ulick O'Connor	N/A
636	April 6, 1965	Gig Young, Charles Aznavour, Suzanne Pleshette, Louis O'Brien	N/A
637	April 7, 1965	Eva Gabor, Chan Thomas	Robert Merrill
638	April 8, 1965	France Nguyen	Tony Bennett
639	April 9, 1965	James Mason	Stanley Black, Anna Moffo
640	April 12, 1965	Joey Bishop guest host; Yogi Berra, Warren Spahn, Joan Rivers, Lou Holtz (comedian)	Connie Francis
641	April 13, 1965	Lola Albright, Ulick O'Connor	Jan Peerce
642	April 14, 1965	Dr. Joyce Brothers, Don Francks	N/A
643	April 15, 1965	Alan King, Eva Gabor, Barbara Cook, fashion expert Eve of Rome	The Righteous Brothers
644	April 16, 1965	Selma Diamond	Earl Wrightson, Lois Hunt
645	April 19, 1965	Sammy Davis Jr. guest host; Art Carney, Diana Sands	Johnny Brown
646	April 20, 1965	Maurice Edelman	Yvonne Constant
647	April 21, 1965	Janet Leigh, Charles Merrill Smith	William Walker
648	April 22, 1965	George Maharis, Gen. Theodore Bedwell	N/A
649	April 23, 1965	Ethel Merman, Buddy Hackett, Homer and Jethro	Frankie Fannelli
650	April 26, 1965	George Hamilton, Al Capp	Ella Logan
651	April 27, 1965	Ed Ames, Myron Cohen, Luba Lisa, Phil Ford & Mimi Hines	The Dorothy Donegan Trio
The "Tomahawk throw".
652	April 28, 1965	Godfrey Cambridge, Shari Lewis, elephant trainer Murray Hill	Jerry Vale
653	April 29, 1965	Ed McMahon and Skitch Henderson guest hosts; Edie Adams, Arlene Dahl, producer Alexander Cohen	Bob McGrath
Johnny Carson was attending the Press Photographer's Ball in Washington.
654	April 30, 1965	Rosemary Clooney	N/A

== May ==
No.	Original release date	Guest(s)	Musical/entertainment guest(s)
655	May 3, 1965	Kim Novak, Gig Young, Kaye Ballard, Louise O'Brien	N/A
656	May 4, 1965	Stella Stevens, Robert Merrill, Irwin Corey	Jan Peerce, Jack Haskell
657	May 5, 1965	Godfrey Cambridge	Jane Morgan
658	May 6, 1965	Zsa Zsa Gabor, Ken Murray	Monty Rock III
659	May 7, 1965	Eydie Gorme, Jack E. Leonard	Billy Daniels, The Highwaymen
660	May 10, 1965	Rudy Vallée, Eva Gabor, Lee Morgan, hairdresser Michel Kazan	N/A
661	May 11, 1965	Ed Begley, Anna Maria Alberghetti, John Bubbles	N/A
662	May 12, 1965	Milt Kamen, NORAD Command Dancers	N/A
663	May 13, 1965	Alan King, Max Lerner, Phyllis Newman	N/A
664	May 14, 1965	Joan Crawford, Dick Shawn, Corbett Monica	N/A
665	May 17, 1965	Woody Allen guest host; Barbara Nichols	N/A
666	May 18, 1965	Don Adams, Carol Lawrence, Harry Golden	N/A
667	May 19, 1965	Dick Shawn, Diahn Williams	Johnny Mathis
668	May 20, 1965	Selma Diamond, Ray Walston	The Modernaires
669	May 21, 1965	Eddie Lawrence, Xavier Cugat, Charo, Emily Yancy, Ed Goldfaden	Don Francks
670	May 24, 1965	George Jessel, Alex and Trude Assael	N/A
671	May 25, 1965	Gig Young, Rose Marie, Mamie Van Doren	N/A
672	May 26, 1965	Rocky Marciano, Anita Gillette, Smith and Dale	Marion Montgomery, William Walker
673	May 27, 1965	Henry Morgan, Tallulah Bankhead, Marya Mannes	Sheila Sullivan
674	May 28, 1965	Ethel Merman, Eydie Gorme, Myron Cohen	Frank d'Rone
675	May 31, 1965	Corbett Monica guest host; Steve Lawrence, Jayne Mansfield, Ronnie Martin	Della Reese,

== June ==
No.	Original release date	Guest(s)	Musical/entertainment guest(s)
676	June 1, 1965	Bill Dana, Oleg Cassini, Joan Rivers	Ruth Price
677	June 2, 1965	Godfrey Cambridge, John le Carré	Ruth Price
678	June 3, 1965	Phyllis Diller, Jack E. Leonard	N/A
679	June 4, 1965	Henry Morgan, Harry Blackstone Jr.	Ruth Price
680	June 7, 1965	Kaye Ballard, Tony Martin	N/A
681	June 8, 1965	Rod Serling, Eva Gabor	Teresa Stratas
682	June 9, 1965	Selma Diamond, Irina Demick	N/A
683	June 10, 1965	Sammy Davis Jr., Phyllis Newman	N/A
684	June 11, 1965	Corbett Monica	Richard Tucker
685	June 14, 1965	Robert Merrill, Ivan Tors, Julia Mead	The Righteous Brothers
686	June 15, 1965	Dan Dailey, Betty Grable	Trini Lopez
687	June 16, 1965	Hans Conried, Barbara O'Neil, Dr. Marguerite Frey	Luba Lisa
688	June 17, 1965	Jack Douglas and Reiko Douglas, Alice Ghostley	Johnny Cash, Huntington (Long Island) High School Orchestra
689	June 18, 1965	Ethel Merman, Cyril Ritchard	Buddy DeFranco
The new National College Queen is crowned.
690	June 21, 1965	Hugh Downs guest host	Pat O'Brien, Redd Foxx
691	June 22, 1965	George Maharis, Joan Rivers, Killer Joe Piro	N/A
692	June 23, 1965	Alan King, Dr. Herbert Axelrod	N/A
693	June 24, 1965	Sid Caesar, Phyllis Newman	N/A
694	June 25, 1965	Zsa Zsa Gabor, Dr. Bernarr Zovluck	N/A
695	June 28, 1965	Kaye Ballard, Redd Foxx	Frankie Avalon, Earl Hines
696	June 29, 1965	Henry Morgan, Ernest Warther	Anita Gillette
697	June 30, 1965	Richard Rodgers, Jack E. Leonard, Marilyn Michaels, Elizabeth Allen	N/A

== July ==
No.	Original release date	Guest(s)	Musical/entertainment guest(s)
698	July 1, 1965	Eydie Gorme, Corbett Monica, Gertrude Berg	N/A
699	July 2, 1965	George Jessel, Portland Hoffa, publisher Joe McCarthy	Eddie Fisher
700	July 5, 1965	Tony Randall, Xavier Cugat and Charo, Bea Lillie, Robert Sirchie	The Denny Zeitlin Trio
701	July 6, 1965	Woody Allen, Max Lerner, Diahn Williams	Arthur Prysock
702	July 7, 1965	Eva Gabor	N/A
703	July 8, 1965	Selma Diamond, Jack Palance	N/A
704	July 9, 1965	George Kirby, Joan Rivers	Jan Peerce
705	July 12, 1965	Jerry Lewis guest host; Jackie Vernon, The Ritts Puppets	Count Basie
Johnny Carson began performing in Las Vegas for an extended engagement.
706	July 13, 1965	Jerry Lewis guest host; Jan Murray	Gary Lewis and the Playboys, Danny Costello, Kay Stevens
707	July 14, 1965	Jerry Lewis guest host	N/A
708	July 15, 1965	Jerry Lewis guest host; Myron Cohen	The Four Freshmen
709	July 16, 1965	Jerry Lewis guest host; Al Capp, Sammy Cahn	N/A
710	July 19, 1965	Joey Bishop guest host; Sammy Davis Jr.	Anthony Newley
Bishop was supposed to start guest hosting the week before, but couldn't due to back trouble.
711	July 20, 1965	Sammy Davis Jr. guest host; Phil Foster, Kay Armen	N/A
712	July 21, 1965	Joey Bishop guest host; Bill Cosby, Glenda Granger	N/A
713	July 22, 1965	Joey Bishop guest host; Frank Fontaine	Roy Clark, Kay Stevens
714	July 23, 1965	Joey Bishop guest host; Allan Sherman	Brenda Lee
715	July 26, 1965	Joey Bishop guest host; Buddy Hackett, Simone Signoret	N/A
716	July 27, 1965	Joey Bishop guest host; Rod Serling	Rhetta and Tennyson
717	July 28, 1965	Joey Bishop guest host; White House Chief of Protocol Lloyd Hand and his wife	The Supremes
718	July 29, 1965	Joey Bishop guest host; Diana Dors, Gertrude Berg	Bob Manning
719	July 30, 1965	Joey Bishop guest host; Frank Sinatra, Sammy Davis Jr., Sally Ann Howes	N/A

== August ==
No.	Original release date	Guest(s)	Musical/entertainment guest(s)
720	August 2, 1965	Joey Bishop guest host	Bobby Rydell
721	August 3, 1965	Joey Bishop guest host; Phyllis Diller	N/A
722	August 4, 1965	Joey Bishop guest host; Corbett Monica	Buddy Greco, Carlos Montoya
723	August 5, 1965	Joey Bishop guest host;	N/A
724	August 6, 1965	Joey Bishop guest host; Eydie Gorme, Adam Keefe	N/A
725	August 9, 1965	Joey Bishop guest host; George Kirby	N/A
726	August 10, 1965	Joey Bishop guest host; Warren Berlinger	Billy Eckstine
727	August 11, 1965	Joey Bishop guest host; George Maharis	Shaw and Costa
728	August 12, 1965	Corbett Monica	N/A
Johnny Carson returns after a month away.
729	August 13, 1965	Ted Sorensen, Joan Rivers	N/A
730	August 16, 1965	Alan King, Kaye Ballard	N/A
731	August 17, 1965	Buddy Hackett, George Jessel, Diana Dors	N/A
732	August 18, 1965	Rudy Vallée, Flip Wilson, Gila Golan, William Walker	Rosemary Squires
733	August 19, 1965	Phyllis Diller	Jan Peerce
Contestants from the Miss USA Pageant were featured.
734	August 20, 1965	George Kirby, Myron Cohen	The Serendipity Singers
735	August 23, 1965	Eydie Gorme, Al Capp	N/A
736	August 24, 1965	Jackie Vernon, John Henry Faulk, Adam Keefe	Neil Sedaka
737	August 25, 1965	Buddy Hackett, Mel Blanc	N/A
738	August 26, 1965	George Kirby, Myron Cohen	The Serendipity Singers
739	August 27, 1965	Michael Caine	The Cariocas
740	August 30, 1965	Alan King, John Bubbles	Jack Haskell, Diana Baker and the Cariocas
741	August 31, 1965	Sheldon Leonard	Homer and Jethro

== September ==
No.	Original release date	Guest(s)	Musical/entertainment guest(s)
742	September 1, 1965	Eve Arden, Peter Lawford, Jackie Vernon	Ethel Ennis
743	September 2, 1965	Ed Begley, Louie Nye, Redd Foxx, Ruth Price	N/A
744	September 3, 1965	George Jessel, John Gavin, Jack Haskell	N/A
745	September 6, 1965	Bill Cosby guest host, The Muppets	Carmen McRae, Bill Henderson
746	September 7, 1965	Ben Gazzara, Jane Morgan, Norm Crosby	N/A
747	September 8, 1965	John Forsythe, Barbara Feldon, Sam Levenson	N/A
748	September 9, 1965	Dick Kallman, Henry Morgan, Myron Cohen	N/A
749	September 10, 1965	Roger Smith, Shani Wallace, William Smith	N/A
750	September 13, 1965	Rosemary Clooney, David McCallum, Jackie Vernon	Joe Williams
751	September 14, 1965	Ethel Merman, Andy Devine, Dr. Richard Evans	The Four Freshmen, Joe Williams
752	September 15, 1965	John Bubbles	Jan Peerce
753	September 16, 1965	George Jessel	N/A
754	September 17, 1965	Corbett Monica, Margaret Whiting, Mark Miller, Harry Golden	N/A
755	September 20, 1965	Kaye Ballard, Pete Rademacher	Robert Merrill, The Kenny Burrell Quartet
756	September 21, 1965	Sammy Davis Jr., Selma Diamond, Allen Sherman, actor Philip Truex	N/A
757	September 22, 1965	Susan Oliver	Tom Lehrer
758	September 23, 1965	Buddy Hackett, Eydie Gorme, Bob Newhart	Frank D'Rone
759	September 24, 1965	Ed McMahon and Skitch Henderson guest hosts	N/A
Johnny Carson had left for California to prepare for the show's two weeks' worth of shows.
760	September 27, 1965	(FROM LOS ANGELES) Bob Hope, Pearl Bailey	N/A
761	September 28, 1965	(FROM LOS ANGELES) Danny Thomas, Carol Lawrence	Robert Goulet
762	September 29, 1965	(FROM LOS ANGELES) Don Adams, Phyllis Newman	January Jones
763	September 30, 1965	(FROM LOS ANGELES) Rose Marie, Jerry Van Dyke, Carol Andresson	N/A

== October ==
No.	Original release date	Guest(s)	Musical/entertainment guest(s)
764	October 1, 1965	(FROM LOS ANGELES) George Burns, Jerry Lewis	N/A
Third anniversary show.
765	October 4, 1965	(FROM LOS ANGELES) Joey Bishop guest host; Frank Sinatra, Dean Martin, Juliet Prowse, Phil Foster, Jay Richard Kennedy	N/A
766	October 5, 1965	(FROM LOS ANGELES) Bill Cosby, George Segal, Carol Andreson, Ray Hastings, Groucho Marx	Paul Revere and the Raiders
767	October 6, 1965	(FROM LOS ANGELES) Bill Dana, Ann Miller, Dick Shawn	N/A
768	October 7, 1965	(FROM LOS ANGELES) Jack Benny, Rudy Vallée, Ann Blyth	N/A
769	October 8, 1965	(FROM LOS ANGELES) Don Rickles, Dick Shawn	N/A
770	October 11, 1965	Kaye Ballard, Jack Palance	N/A
771	October 12, 1965	Corbett Monica	Petula Clark, Alan Dale Brasil 66
772	October 13, 1965	Buddy Hackett, beauty consultant Eve of Roma	Charles Aznavour
773	October 14, 1965	TBA	N/A
774	October 15, 1965	Selma Diamond, George Kirby	N/A
775	October 18, 1965	Alan King guest host; Arlene Francis, Bernard Hollowood	Carol Sloane
776	October 19, 1965	Jack Douglas and wife Reiko	Julie London
777	October 20, 1965	George Maharis, Buddy Hackett	N/A
778	October 21, 1965	Jerry Van Dyke	N/A
779	October 22, 1965	Florence Henderson	N/A
780	October 25, 1965	Bette Davis, Edgar Bergen, Oleg Cassini	N/A
781	October 26, 1965	Elsa Lanchester	N/A
782	October 27, 1965	Jackie Vernon	Petula Clark
783	October 28, 1965	Florence Henderson, Al Capp	N/A
784	October 29, 1965	Diahann Carroll	N/A

== November ==
No.	Original release date	Guest(s)	Musical/entertainment guest(s)
785	November 1, 1965	Alan King guest host; Allan Sherman, Dixie Dean Harris	N/A
786	November 2, 1965	Robert Merrill	N/A
787	November 3, 1965	TBA	N/A
788	November 4, 1965	George Kirby, Joan Rivers	N/A
789	November 5, 1965	Carol Lawrence, Murray Roman	N/A
790	November 8, 1965	Shari Lewis, Jack Douglas and wife Reiko	N/A
11/9/1965 program cancelled due to the Northeast blackout. Scheduled guests were Yves St. Laurent, Robert Merrill, Virginia Martin.
791	November 10, 1965	Yves St. Laurent	N/A
792	November 11, 1965	George Kirby, Joan Rivers	N/A
793	November 12, 1965	Ethel Merman, Brian Kelly, Murray Roman	N/A
794	November 15, 1965	Selma Diamond, Anna Moffo	Mel Tormé
795	November 16, 1965	Omar Sharif, Kaye Ballard, Norris McWhirter and Ross McWhirter	N/A
796	November 17, 1965	Robert Young, Jack E. Leonard, Virginia Martin	N/A
797	November 18, 1965	TBA	N/A
798	November 19, 1965	Bill Dana	N/A
799	November 22, 1965	TBA	N/A
800	November 23, 1965	Myron Cohen	Ian and Sylvia
801	November 24, 1965	Henry Morgan, Claudine Auger	The Ramsey Lewis Trio
802	November 25, 1965	Ruby Keeler, Sammy Cahn	Paul Anka
803	November 26, 1965	Sam Levenson guest host; Richard Tucker	N/A
804	November 29, 1965	Alan King, Muhammad Ali	Little Jimmy Dickens
805	November 30, 1965	Bill Dana	Arthur Prysock

== December ==
No.	Original release date	Guest(s)	Musical/entertainment guest(s)
806	December 1, 1965	Murray Roman	N/A
807	December 2, 1965	Kaye Ballard	N/A
808	December 3, 1965	Willie Mays, Dan Dailey	Teresa Brewer
809	December 6, 1965	Phil Ford and Mimi Hines	Vic Damone
810	December 7, 1965	Robert Merrill, Robert Traver	Luba Lisa
811	December 8, 1965	Louie Nye, Jonathan Winters	N/A
812	December 9, 1965	Sammy Davis Jr., Shari Lewis, Laurence Harvey	N/A
813	December 10, 1965	Geraldine Chaplin, Corbett Monica	N/A
814	December 13, 1965	Florence Henderson, Rudy Vallée	Dionne Warwick
815	December 14, 1965	Betsy Palmer	N/A
816	December 15, 1965	Lena Horne	Count Basie
817	December 16, 1965	Eydie Gorme	N/A
818	December 17, 1965	Jack Douglas and his wife Reiko, New York attorney general Louis Lefkowitz	N/A
819	December 20, 1965	George Kirby	N/A
820	December 21, 1965	Maximilian Schell, Godfrey Cambridge, Anita Gillette, John Byner	N/A
821	December 22, 1965	Jan De Ruth, The Depasqualie Brothers	N/A
822	December 23, 1965	Alan King guest host; Eli Wallach, Sheila MacRae, Jackie Clarke, Phil Ford and Mimi Hines	N/A
823	December 27, 1965	Don Adams, Hal Frazier	N/A
824	December 28, 1965	Selma Diamond	N/A
825	December 29, 1965	Luba Lisa	Eddy Arnold
826	December 30, 1965	Mickey Rooney	N/A
827	December 31, 1965	Woody Allen, Criswell, Phil Ford, Mimi Hines, Gila Golan, William Walker	Jim Henson's Muppets
