= List of The Tonight Show Starring Johnny Carson episodes (1966) =

- No. of episodes: 258

Release
- Original network: NBC

Season chronology
- ← Previous; 1965 episodes Next → 1967 episodes

The following is a list of episodes of the television series The Tonight Show Starring Johnny Carson which aired in 1966. In October, 1962 Johnny Carson took over as host of the show from the previous host Jack Paar.

== January ==
No.	Original release date	Guest(s)	Musical/entertainment guest(s)
828	January 3, 1966	Henry Morgan guest host; Lauren Bacall, Abe Burrows, Rob Sagendorph	Jane Harvey
829	January 4, 1966	Sammy Davis Jr. guest host; Chester Morris, Johnny Hartman	N/A
830	January 5, 1966	Woody Allen guest host; Ernie Terrell, John Searne	N/A
831	January 6, 1966	Corbett Monica guest host	N/A
832	January 7, 1966	Bill Dana guest host	Tony Bennett
833	January 10, 1966	Betsy Palmer	N/A
834	January 11, 1966	Polly Bergen, Buddy Hackett	N/A
835	January 12, 1966	Murray Roman	N/A
836	January 13, 1966	Alan King	N/A
837	January 14, 1966	Margaret Leighton, Michael Wilding, Kaye Ballard, Hal Frazier	N/A
838	January 17, 1966	Roger Moore, Ann Sheridan, Milt Kamen, Annette Sanders	N/A
839	January 18, 1966	James Coburn, Jack Douglas and wife Reiko	N/A
840	January 19, 1966	Godfrey Cambridge	N/A
841	January 20, 1966	Jan Peerce, Judi Rolin, Dick Cavett	N/A
842	January 21, 1966	Sam Levenson	N/A
843	January 24, 1966	Gene Kelly, Honor Blackman, Charlie Manna	Paul Bogosian
844	January 25, 1966	Rod Serling, Al Capp, Julie Migenes	N/A
845	January 26, 1966	George Segal, Myron Cohen	Yvonne Constant
846	January 27, 1966	TBA	Andre Previn
847	January 28, 1966	Don Adams, Rose Marie, William Frawley,	Johnny Cash, Ruth Price
848	January 31, 1966	George Kirby, Shari Lewis, Jack Palance, Leo Durocher	N/A

== February ==
No.	Original release date	Guest(s)	Musical/entertainment guest(s)
849	February 1, 1966	TBA	N/A
850	February 2, 1966	TBA	N/A
851	February 3, 1966	Kaye Stevens	N/A
852	February 4, 1966	Kaye Ballard, Xavier Cugat and Charo	N/A
853	February 7, 1966	TBA	N/A
854	February 8, 1966	Oleg Cassini, Norm Crosby	Liza Minnelli
855	February 9, 1966	TBA	N/A
856	February 10, 1966	TBA	Barbara Velasco
857	February 11, 1966	Phil Ford and Mimi Hines	N/A
858	February 14, 1966	TBA	N/A
859	February 15, 1966	Dick Cavett	N/A
860	February 16, 1966	Henry Morgan, Yvonne Constant, John Fuller,	Paul Anka, Los Indios Tabajaras, Barbara Velasco
861	February 17, 1966	George Segal, Bunny Yeager	N/A
862	February 18, 1966	TBA	N/A
863	February 21, 1966	Zsa Zsa Gabor, psychologist Richard Evans	N/A
864	February 22, 1966	Stella Stevens, Vittorio Gassman	N/A
865	February 23, 1966	Charlie Manna	N/A
866	February 25, 1966	Bob Barker guest host; MacDonald Carey, Joe Garagiola, Cliff Arquette, Dr. Lorreine Chase	The Everly Brothers
867	February 28, 1966	Alan King guest host; Harry Belafonte, Dick Roman	Kay Starr

== March ==
No.	Original release date	Guest(s)	Musical/entertainment guest(s)
868	March 1, 1966	Alan King guest host;	N/A
869	March 2, 1966	Hugh Downs guest host; Shelley Winters, Larry Blyden, Margie King	Ethel Ennis
870	March 3, 1966	Henry Morgan guest host;	N/A
871	March 4, 1966	Henry Morgan guest host;	N/A
872	March 7, 1966	Corbett Monica, Betsy Palmer, coats of arms demonstrators A. Seddon and C. Guarino	Jan Peerce
873	March 8, 1966	Joan Rivers	Trini Lopez, Fran Warren
874	March 9, 1966	Kaye Ballard, Milt Kamen, Jan De Ruth	Don Cherry
875	March 10, 1966	Selma Diamond, Murray Roman	Anita Gillette
876	March 11, 1966	Ed McMahon and Skitch Henderson guest hosts	N/A
877	March 14, 1966	(FROM LOS ANGELES); James Garner, Eva Marie Saint, Sam Yorty	Maria Cole
878	March 15, 1966	(FROM LOS ANGELES) Don Adams	N/A
879	March 16, 1966	(FROM LOS ANGELES) Eva Gabor	N/A
880	March 17, 1966	(FROM LOS ANGELES) Jack Benny	Baja Marimba Band
881	March 18, 1966	(FROM LOS ANGELES) George Burns, Pat Woodell	N/A
882	March 21, 1966	(FROM LOS ANGELES) Samantha Eggar	N/A
883	March 22, 1966	(FROM LOS ANGELES) Joanne Woodward, Morey Amsterdam, Diane Shelton	N/A
884	March 23, 1966	(FROM LOS ANGELES) Bette Davis, The Smothers Brothers	The Andrews Sisters
885	March 24, 1966	(FROM LOS ANGELES) Burt Lancaster, Greer Garson	N/A
886	March 25, 1966	(FROM LOS ANGELES) Rod Steiger, Bill Cosby, Don Rickles, Rose Marie	N/A
887	March 28, 1966	TBA	N/A
888	March 29, 1966	TBA	N/A
889	March 30, 1966	TBA	N/A
890	March 31, 1966	Father Robert Capon	Al Hirt

== April ==
No.	Original release date	Guest(s)	Musical/entertainment guest(s)
891	April 1, 1966	Godfrey Cambridge	N/A
892	April 4, 1966	TBA	N/A
893	April 5, 1966	TBA	N/A
894	April 6, 1966	TBA	Kate Smith
895	April 7, 1966	Kaye Ballard	N/A
896	April 8, 1966	Joan Rivers	Charles Aznavour
897	April 11, 1966	Woody Allen, Eydie Gorme	N/A
898	April 12, 1966	Phil Ford and Mimi Hines	N/A
899	April 13, 1966	Larry Storch	N/A
900	April 14, 1966	Gila Golan	N/A
901	April 15, 1966	Dick Cavett	N/A
902	April 18, 1966	Alan King guest host, Hal Holbrook, Diahann Carroll, Sugar Ray Robinson	N/A
903	April 19, 1966	Alan King guest host, Robert Preston, Godfrey Cambridge	Selma Lee, Rosetta Shaw
904	April 20, 1966	Henry Morgan guest host;	N/A
905	April 21, 1966	Henry Morgan guest host;	N/A
906	April 22, 1966	Henry Morgan guest host;	N/A
907	April 25, 1966	George Jessel, Marilyn Maxwell	Wayne King
908	April 26, 1966	Bob Hope, Morey Amsterdam	N/A
909	April 27, 1966	Ray Walston, Phyllis Newman, Dr. Albert Hibbs	N/A
910	April 28, 1966	Peter Ustinov, Corbett Monica	N/A
911	April 29, 1966	Myron Cohen	N/A

== May ==
No.	Original release date	Guest(s)	Musical/entertainment guest(s)
912	May 2, 1966	Sammy Davis, Jr., Eydie Gorme	N/A
913	May 3, 1966	Eva Gabor, Oleg Cassini, Charlie Manna	N/A
914	May 4, 1966	Buddy Hackett	Jane Morgan, Paul Horne
915	May 5, 1966	TBA	N/A
916	May 6, 1966	TBA	N/A
917	May 9, 1966	Bob Newhart, Shari Lewis	The Wiltwyck Steel Band
918	May 10, 1966	Buddy Hackett, Mamie Van Doren	N/A
919	May 11, 1966	Kaye Ballard	N/A
920	May 12, 1966	Adam West, Bob Holiday, Joan Rivers, Gabriel Fielding	N/A
921	May 13, 1966	TBA	N/A
922	May 16, 1966	TBA	Robert Goulet
923	May 17, 1966	Phil Ford and Mimi Hines	Harry James
924	May 18, 1966	Tom Smothers, Fred Finn	Eddy Arnold
925	May 19, 1966	Corbett Monica	Anna Moffo
926	May 20, 1966	Dick Cavett	N/A
927	May 23, 1966	Jerry Lewis guest host, Phil Foster	Patrice Munsel, Roy Clark
928	May 24, 1966	Jerry Lewis guest host	Count Basie
929	May 25, 1966	Jerry Lewis guest host	N/A
930	May 26, 1966	Jerry Lewis guest host	N/A
931	May 27, 1966	Jerry Lewis guest host	N/A
932	May 30, 1966	Claudia Cardinale, Bill Dana	N/A
933	May 31, 1966	Phyllis Newman, Morey Amsterdam, Eva Gabor, Betsy Palmer, Peter Foy	N/A

== June ==
No.	Original release date	Guest(s)	Musical/entertainment guest(s)
934	June 1, 1966	George Carlin	N/A
935	June 2, 1966	TBA	N/A
936	June 3, 1966	Shirley Jones, George Jessel, Lois Wyse, The Amazing Randi	N/A
937	June 6, 1966	Florence Henderson, Dan Rowan and Dick Martin, Selma Diamond, Martin Rackin	N/A
938	June 7, 1966	Shari Lewis, Norm Crosby	N/A
939	June 8, 1966	Edie Adams, Bob Hope, Stan Kann	N/A
First appearance of "gadget man" Stan Kann.
940	June 9, 1966	Pearl Bailey, Phyllis Newman, Sandy Baron	N/A
941	June 10, 1966	Gordon MacRae	N/A
942	June 13, 1966	Martin Rackin	Connie Francis
943	June 14, 1966	TBA	Horst Jankowski
944	June 15, 1966	Eydie Gorme	N/A
945	June 16, 1966	George Peppard, Soupy Sales, Luba Lisa	N/A
946	June 17, 1966	TBA	N/A
947	June 20, 1966	Shirley Jones, Jack Cassidy, Phil Foster, Mamie Van Doren, Henry Silva	N/A
948	June 21, 1966	Jackie Vernon	Julius La Rosa, William Walker
949	June 22, 1966	TBA	N/A
950	June 23, 1966	James Coburn	Kaye Stevens
951	June 24, 1966	Florence Henderson	N/A
952	June 27, 1966	Robert Merrill, Kaye Ballard, Robert F. Dacey	The Newport Jazz Festival All-Stars
953	June 28, 1966	Al Capp	Yvonne Constant, January Jones
954	June 29, 1966	Mamie Van Doren	Nana Mouskouri
955	June 30, 1966	Sue Ane Langdon	N/A

== July ==
No.	Original release date	Guest(s)	Musical/entertainment guest(s)
956	July 1, 1966	Pat Boone	Lesley Gore
957	July 4, 1966	Dick Cavett, Phil Ford and Mimi Hines, acrobat Berosinis	Chad Mitchell
958	July 5, 1966	Buddy Hackett, Kathy Dunn, Jenny Smith	Jan Peerce, Tom Vaughn
959	July 6, 1966	George Gobel, Phyllis Newman, Rudi Blesh	N/A
960	July 7, 1966	Robert Young, Paula Wayne	Sammy Davis, Jr.
961	July 8, 1966	Alan King, Betsy Palmer	John Bubbles
962	July 11, 1966	Joey Bishop guest host, George Kirby, Willie Mosconi	N/A
Joey Bishop begins 12 nights worth of shows as guest host.
963	July 12, 1966	Joey Bishop guest host	N/A
964	July 13, 1966	Joey Bishop guest host	N/A
965	July 14, 1966	Joey Bishop guest host	N/A
966	July 15, 1966	Joey Bishop guest host	N/A
967	July 18, 1966	Joey Bishop guest host	N/A
968	July 19, 1966	Joey Bishop guest host	N/A
969	July 20, 1966	Joey Bishop guest host	N/A
970	July 21, 1966	Joey Bishop guest host	N/A
971	July 22, 1966	Joey Bishop guest host	N/A
972	July 25, 1966	Joey Bishop guest host	N/A
973	July 26, 1966	Joey Bishop guest host	N/A
974	July 27, 1966	Jack E. Leonard guest host	N/A
975	July 28, 1966	Arthur Godfrey guest host, Abe Burrows, Linda Scott	N/A
976	July 29, 1966	Eddy Arnold guest host	N/A

== August ==
No.	Original release date	Guest(s)	Musical/entertainment guest(s)
977	August 1, 1966	Ed McMahon and Skitch Henderson guest hosts	N/A
978	August 2, 1966	Sammy Davis, Jr. guest host	N/A
Sammy Davis Jr. guest hosts for the remainder of the week.
979	August 3, 1966	Sammy Davis, Jr. guest host	N/A
980	August 4, 1966	Sammy Davis, Jr. guest host	N/A
981	August 5, 1966	Sammy Davis, Jr. guest host, Gwen Verdon, George Kirby	N/A
982	August 8, 1966	Sam Levenson and Florence Henderson guest hosts	N/A
Sam Levenson and Florence begin a week as guest hosts.
983	August 9, 1966	Sam Levenson and Florence Henderson guest hosts	N/A
984	August 10, 1966	Sam Levenson and Florence Henderson guest hosts	N/A
985	August 11, 1966	Sam Levenson and Florence Henderson guest hosts	N/A
986	August 12, 1966	Sam Levenson and Florence Henderson guest hosts	N/A
987	August 15, 1966	Bob Newhart guest host, Edie Adams, Buddy Hackett	N/A
Bob Newhart begins a week as guest host.
988	August 16, 1966	Bob Newhart guest host	Peter Nero
989	August 17, 1966	Bob Newhart guest host	N/A
990	August 18, 1966	Bob Newhart guest host	The Supremes
991	August 19, 1966	Bob Newhart guest host	N/A
992	August 22, 1966	Hugh Downs guest host, Brian Epstein, Larry Blyden	N/A
Hugh Downs begins a week as guest host.
993	August 23, 1966	Hugh Downs guest host	N/A
994	August 24, 1966	Hugh Downs guest host	N/A
995	August 25, 1966	Hugh Downs guest host	N/A
996	August 26, 1966	Hugh Downs guest host	N/A
997	August 29, 1966	New York City mayor John Lindsay, Walter Pidgeon, Phyllis Newman	The Tracey Brothers
998	August 30, 1966	Louis Nye	N/A
999	August 31, 1966	Kaye Ballard	N/A

== September ==
No.	Original release date	Guest(s)	Musical/entertainment guest(s)
1000	September 1, 1966	TBA	N/A
The 1000th episode of The Tonight Show Starring Johnny Carson airs.
1001	September 2, 1966	Six Miss America contestants: Launa Kay Gardner (Arizona); Loretta Ann Perreira (Hawaii); Estrellita Schiel (Oregon); Denise Fledderman (North Dakota); Penelope Donoghue (New York) and Linda Jo Maclin (Virginia).	N/A
1002	September 5, 1966	Dick Cavett	The Treniers
1003	September 6, 1966	TBA	N/A
1004	September 7, 1966	TBA	N/A
1005	September 8, 1966	TBA	N/A
1006	September 9, 1966	TBA	N/A
1007	September 12, 1966	Warren Beatty, George Jessel	N/A
1008	September 13, 1966	Alan King, Pierre Salinger	Rosemary Clooney
1009	September 14, 1966	TBA	N/A
1010	September 15, 1966	TBA	N/A
1011	September 16, 1966	TBA	N/A
1012	September 19, 1966	George Kirby, Norm Crosby	Kaye Stevens
1013	September 20, 1966	Jackie Vernon	N/A
1014	September 21, 1966	TBA	Joan Rivers
A fashion show was also part of the program.
1015	September 22, 1966	Dick Cavett	N/A
1016	September 23, 1966	Arlene Dahl, Milt Kamen	N/A
1017	September 26, 1966	(FROM LOS ANGELES) Vice President Hubert Humphrey, Bob Hope, Claudia Cardinale	N/A
1018	September 27, 1966	(FROM LOS ANGELES) Jack Benny, Sammy Davis, Jr., Natalie Wood	N/A
1019	September 28, 1966	(FROM LOS ANGELES) George Burns	Della Reese
1020	September 29, 1966	(FROM LOS ANGELES) Bill Cosby	N/A
1021	September 30, 1966	(FROM LOS ANGELES) Danny Thomas, Don Rickles, Jonathan Winters	N/A

== October ==
No.	Original release date	Guest(s)	Musical/entertainment guest(s)
1022	October 3, 1966	(FROM LOS ANGELES) Senator Barry Goldwater, Don Adams	N/A
1023	October 4, 1966	(FROM LOS ANGELES) Pat Boone, George Jessel	N/A
1024	October 5, 1966	(FROM LOS ANGELES) Peter Ustinov, Eva Marie Saint	N/A
1025	October 6, 1966	(FROM LOS ANGELES) Rock Hudson. Janet Leigh	N/A
1026	October 7, 1966	(FROM LOS ANGELES) Rose Marie	Roger Miller
1027	October 10, 1966	Steve Lawrence guest host, Ruta Lee, Pat Henry	Robert Goulet
1028	October 11, 1966	Steve Lawrence guest host	N/A
1029	October 12, 1966	Steve Lawrence guest host	N/A
1030	October 13, 1966	Steve Lawrence guest host	N/A
1031	October 14, 1966	Steve Lawrence guest host	N/A
Skitch Henderson leaves The Tonight Show as the musical director for the NBC Orchestra.
1032	October 17, 1966	TBA	N/A
Milton DeLugg joins The Tonight Show as the musical director for the NBC Orchestra, replacing Skitch Henderson.
1033	October 18, 1966	Ethel Merman, Soupy Sales	N/A
1034	October 19, 1966	Phyllis Newman	N/A
1035	October 20, 1966	Bette Davis, April Olrich	N/A
1036	October 21, 1966	Al Capp	N/A
1037	October 24, 1966	Buddy Hackett, Dr. Richard Evans	Don Cherry
1038	October 25, 1966	Jackie Vernon, Robert Creighton	Ella Fitzgerald, Anna Moffo
1039	October 26, 1966	Dick Cavett, Susannah York	N/A
1040	October 27, 1966	Ethel Merman, Xavier Cugat, Charlie Manna	N/A
1041	October 28, 1966	TBA	N/A
1042	October 31, 1966	Shari Lewis, Milbourne Christopher	N/A

== November ==
No.	Original release date	Guest(s)	Musical/entertainment guest(s)
1043	November 1, 1966	Alan King, Verna Lisi	N/A
A Nina Ricci fashion show was presented.
1044	November 2, 1966	TBA	N/A
1045	November 3, 1966	TBA	N/A
1046	November 4, 1966	Tony Randall, Diahann Carroll	N/A
1047	November 7, 1966	Joan Rivers	N/A
11/8/1966 episode pre-empted for NBC News coverage of mid-term elections.
1048	November 9, 1966	Don Rickles	N/A
1049	November 10, 1966	Soupy Sales, Rosemary Forsyth, Marlin Perkins	Buddy Rich
1050	November 11, 1966	Oleg Cassini	N/A
1051	November 14, 1966	George Carlin, author Gerold Frank	Yvonne Constant
1052	November 15, 1966	TBA	N/A
1053	November 16, 1966	TBA	N/A
Programs for November 17–18 cancelled to AFTRA dispute. November 17 scheduled guests were Hank Greenspun and Dick Contino.
1054	November 21, 1966	TBA	N/A
1055	November 22, 1966	Steve Allen, Dr. Joyce Brothers	Frankie Laine
1056	November 23, 1966	TBA	N/A
1057	November 24, 1966	TBA	N/A
1058	November 25, 1966	Kaye Ballard, Victor Borge	N/A
1059	November 28, 1966	Jackie Vernon, Beryl Reid	N/A
1060	November 29, 1966	Henry Morgan, Patricia Routledge	N/A
1061	November 30, 1966	George Jessel, Peter Marshall	N/A

== December ==
No.	Original release date	Guest(s)	Musical/entertainment guest(s)
1062	December 1, 1966	Larry Blyden, writer/publisher Harry Golden	Kate Smith
1063	December 2, 1966	Sen. Everett Dirksen	N/A
1064	December 5, 1966	Sen. Barry Goldwater	The Mills Brothers
1065	December 6, 1966	TBA	N/A
1066	December 7, 1966	Dr. Sam Sheppard	N/A
1067	December 8, 1966	William F. Buckley, Jr.	N/A
1068	December 9, 1966	Sam Levenson, Ed Ames, Eydie Gorme	N/A
1069	December 12, 1966	Woody Allen, Jack Lord	N/A
1070	December 13, 1966	Steve Lawrence	N/A
1071	December 14, 1966	George Segal	N/A
1072	December 15, 1966	Corbett Monica, Al Capp	N/A
1073	December 16, 1966	Henry Morgan, Phyllis Newman	N/A
1074	December 19, 1966	Steve McQueen, Richard Chamberlain	Billy Williams
1075	December 20, 1966	Eva Marie Saint, Joan Rivers	N/A
1076	December 21, 1966	Richard Crenna, Kaye Ballard	N/A
1077	December 22, 1966	TBA	N/A
1078	December 23, 1966	Sammy Davis, Jr., artist Jan Deruth	N/A
1079	December 26, 1966	Shirley Jones, Jack Cassidy	N/A
1080	December 27, 1966	TBA	N/A
1081	December 28, 1966	Ivan Tors	N/A
1082	December 29, 1966	Stefanie Powers, Noel Harrison	N/A
1083	December 30, 1966	TBA	Kaye Stevens, Charlie Barnet and his Orchestra
