= List of The Tonight Show Starring Johnny Carson episodes (1967) =

Release
- Original network: NBC

Season chronology
- ← Previous; 1966 episodes Next → 1968 episodes

The following is a list of episodes of the television series The Tonight Show Starring Johnny Carson which aired in 1967. In October, 1962 Johnny Carson took over as host of the show from the previous host Jack Paar.

== 1967 ==
=== January ===
No.	Original release date	Guest(s)	Musical/entertainment guest(s)
1084	January 2, 1967	Theodore Bikel, Morey Amsterdam	N/A
1085	January 3, 1967	TBA	N/A
1086	January 4, 1967	Henry Morgan, Sarah Vaughan	Jill St. John
1087	January 5, 1967	Buddy Hackett, Dr. Margaret Mead, Frances Langford, Shirley Jones	N/A
1088	January 6, 1967	Jane Fonda, George Jessel	N/A
1089	January 9, 1967	Pat Boone (guest host), Sid Caesar, Selma Diamond, Clint Eastwood	Buddy Greco
1090	January 10, 1967	Pat Boone (guest host), Rich Little	N/A
1091	January 11, 1967	Pat Boone (guest host), Woody Woodbury, Adam Keefe	N/A
1092	January 12, 1967	Pat Boone (guest host), Peter Ustinov	N/A
1093	January 13, 1967	Pat Boone (guest host), Dom DeLuise	N/A
1094	January 16, 1967	Bob Newhart (guest host), Norm Crosby, Fannie Flagg	N/A
1095	January 17, 1967	Bob Newhart (guest host),	N/A
1096	January 18, 1967	Bob Newhart (guest host), Louis Nye	N/A
1097	January 19, 1967	Bob Newhart (guest host), Shelley Winters, John Byner	N/A
1098	January 20, 1967	Bob Newhart (guest host), Florence Henderson, Murray Roman, Joe Garagiola	N/A
1099	January 23, 1967	Dick Cavett, James Mason, Tony Martin, Beverly Todd	N/A
1100	January 24, 1967	Carol Wayne	N/A
1101	January 25, 1967	TBA	N/A
1102	January 26, 1967	Phyllis Newman, Robert Culp	N/A
1103	January 27, 1967	Charlie Manna	N/A
1104	January 30, 1967	Tony Randall, Robert Shaw	N/A
1105	January 31, 1967	Jackie Vernon, Abbe Lane	N/A

=== February ===
No.	Original release date	Guest(s)	Musical/entertainment guest(s)
1106	February 1, 1967	Robert Merrill, Jan Peerce, Sarah Churchill	N/A
1107	February 2, 1967	Rod Steiger, Eydie Gorme, Soupy Sales, Bart Starr	N/A
1108	February 3, 1967	TBA	N/A
1109	February 6, 1967	Morton Hunt, Herschel Bernardi, Mimi Hines	N/A
1110	February 7, 1967	Tony Bennett, Professor Irwin Corey	N/A
1111	February 8, 1967	Al Capp, Sen. Jacob Javits	N/A
1112	February 9, 1967	Corbett Monica	N/A
1113	February 10, 1967	Henry Morgan, Mitzi Gaynor, Muhammad Ali	N/A
1114	February 13, 1967	Carol Lawrence	N/A
1115	February 14, 1967	Gov. Norbert T. Tiemann, Steve Allen, Jayne Meadows	N/A
1116	February 15, 1967	Betsy Palmer, Mitzi Gaynor, Eddy Arnold	N/A
1117	February 16, 1967	Phyllis Newman, Betsy Palmer, Ashley Montagu	N/A
1118	February 17, 1967	Soupy Sales, Lynn Redgrave, Elmer Carlson	N/A
1119	February 20, 1967	George Kirby, Joan Rivers	N/A
1120	February 21, 1967	Sam Levenson	Martina Arroyo
1121	February 22, 1967	Buddy Hackett, Dr. Robert Ellinger	N/A
1122	February 23, 1967	Maximilian Schell	Buddy DeFranco
1123	February 24, 1967	Florence Henderson, Paul Sann, Jackie Vernon	N/A
1124	February 27, 1967	(FROM LOS ANGELES) Bob Hope	Della Reese
1125	February 28, 1967	(FROM LOS ANGELES) Bill Cosby	N/A

=== March ===
No.	Original release date	Guest(s)	Musical/entertainment guest(s)
1126	March 1, 1967	(FROM LOS ANGELES) Mickey Rooney, Annette Funicello	N/A
1127	March 2, 1967	(FROM LOS ANGELES)	N/A
1128	March 3, 1967	(FROM LOS ANGELES) James Garner, Pearl Bailey	N/A
1129	March 6, 1967	(FROM LOS ANGELES) Don Adams, Carol Lawrence, Macdonald Carey, Jack Haley, Jr.	N/A
1130	March 7, 1967	(FROM LOS ANGELES)	N/A
1131	March 8, 1967	(FROM LOS ANGELES) Barbara Eden	N/A
1132	March 9, 1967	(FROM LOS ANGELES) George Burns, Kaye Ballard	N/A
1133	March 10, 1967	(FROM LOS ANGELES) Eva Gabor	Mel Tormé
1134	March 13, 1967	New York governor Nelson Rockefeller, Buddy Hackett, Robert Morse	Connie Stevens
On the show, Rockefeller suggested Carson run against Robert F. Kennedy for the U.S. Senate in 1970.
1135	March 14, 1967	TBA	N/A
1136	March 15, 1967	Henry Morgan, Max Lerner	N/A
1137	March 16, 1967	TBA	N/A
1138	March 17, 1967	TBA	N/A
1139	March 20, 1967	Woody Allen (guest host), Jerry Lewis, David Merrick, Ursula Andress	Jake Holmes
1140	March 21, 1967	Woody Allen (guest host), Joan Rivers	N/A
1141	March 22, 1967	Woody Allen (guest host), Robert Shaw	N/A
1142	March 23, 1967	Woody Allen (guest host)	N/A
1143	March 24, 1967	Woody Allen (guest host)	Vic Damone
1144	March 27, 1967	Corbett Monica, Steve Allen, Jayne Meadows	N/A
1145	March 28, 1967	George Carlin	N/A
The AFTRA Strike began at 5am the next morning, putting The Tonight Show on temporary hiatus, with NBC showing repeats.

=== April ===
No.	Original release date	Guest(s)	Musical/entertainment guest(s)
1146	April 10, 1967	Jimmy Dean (Guest Host)	N/A
Johnny Carson refused to return to the show, saying on April 4 that NBC had violated his contract by showing reruns during the strike. NBC stated that they would hold him to his contract which ran through 1970.
1147	April 11, 1967	Jimmy Dean (Guest Host)	N/A
1148	April 12, 1967	Jimmy Dean (Guest Host)	N/A
1149	April 13, 1967	Jimmy Dean (Guest Host)	N/A
1150	April 14, 1967	Jimmy Dean (Guest Host)	N/A
1151	April 17, 1967	Jimmy Dean (Guest Host)	N/A
1152	April 18, 1967	Jimmy Dean (Guest Host)	N/A
1153	April 19, 1967	Jimmy Dean (Guest Host), Leonard Nimoy	Martha Raye
1154	April 20, 1967	Jimmy Dean (Guest Host)	N/A
1155	April 21, 1967	Jimmy Dean (Guest Host)	N/A
1156	April 24, 1967	Buddy Hackett, Mamie Van Doren, Phil Leeds	Peter, Paul and Mary
Johnny Carson returns as host after renegotiating his contract and one week after the premiere of The Joey Bishop Show as well as the first night of the ratings period.
1157	April 25, 1967	Sammy Davis, Jr., Susan Oliver, Clive Revill	Count Basie, Roger Miller
1158	April 26, 1967	Billy Graham, Allen Funt	Della Reese
1159	April 27, 1967	Robert F. Kennedy, Bob Hope	N/A
1160	April 28, 1967	Diahann Carroll, Milt Kamen, Peter Bull, parachutist William Ottley	N/A

=== May ===
No.	Original release date	Guest(s)	Musical/entertainment guest(s)
1161	May 1, 1967	Jack Palance, Joan Rivers, Dr. Frank Field	Stan Kenton
1162	May 2, 1967	New York City mayor John Lindsay, Sandra Hilder	N/A
1163	May 3, 1967	Martha Raye, Great Antonio	Jerry Vale
1164	May 4, 1967	Gore Vidal, Pamela Austin	Luiz Bonfa
1165	May 5, 1967	F. Lee Bailey	N/A
1166	May 8, 1967	TBA	N/A
1167	May 9, 1967	TBA	The Allen Brothers
Ed McMahon sings his new record, "Beautiful Girl".
1168	May 10, 1967	Allen Funt	Spanky and Our Gang
1169	May 11, 1967	Alan King, Nina Ricci, Dr. Frank Field	N/A
A Ricci fashion show was presented.
1170	May 12, 1967	Gloria Swanson	N/A
1171	May 15, 1967	Jack Cassidy, George Peppard	N/A
1172	May 16, 1967	Luba Lisa, Flip Wilson, Lyn Tornabene	Duluth Accordionaires
1173	May 17, 1967	Shari Lewis, Phil Ford and Mimi Hines, author and priest Father Bernard Basset	N/A
1174	May 18, 1967	Roger Moore, Bob Considine	Lana Cantrell
1175	May 19, 1967	Zsa Zsa Gabor, anthropologist Ashley Montagu	N/A
A fur fashion show was presented.
1176	May 22, 1967	Woody Allen, Eva Gabor, orchestra leader Helen Quach	The Supremes
1177	May 23, 1967	Alan King, Irene Tsu, soccer expert Danny Blanchflower	The Allen Brothers
1178	May 24, 1967	Vincent Price	Eddy Arnold
1179	May 25, 1967	Stiller and Meara, Soupy Sales	Dorothy Loudon, Joe Bushkin
1180	May 26, 1967	Tony Randall	N/A
1181	May 29, 1967	Lois Maxwell, Monti Rock III, comedian Fred Smoot, weightlifter Paul Anderson	Tommy Leonetti
1182	May 30, 1967	Kaye Stevens	N/A
1183	May 31, 1967	George Kirby	N/A

=== June ===
No.	Original release date	Guest(s)	Musical/entertainment guest(s)
1184	June 1, 1967	Peter Ustinov	N/A
1185	June 2, 1967	Melina Mercouri, David Frye, ESP expert Peter Hurkos and Ivan Volkman, a Lyndon Johnson lookalike	N/A
1186	June 5, 1967	Robert Goulet	N/A
1187	June 6, 1967	Jean Shrimpton	The Serendipity Singers
1188	June 7, 1967	Senta Berger	N/A
1189	June 8, 1967	Jim Brown, Dave Garroway, Melvin Belli	N/A
1190	June 9, 1967	Oleg Cassini	N/A
1191	June 12, 1967	Myrna Loy, Eddie Lawrence, author and priest Father Bernard Basset	Gary and the Hornets
1192	June 13, 1967	George Segal, Hugh Hefner	Engelbert Humperdinck
1193	June 14, 1967	Jim Brown	Trini Lopez
1194	June 15, 1967	Alan King, football announcer Benny Friedman, Canadian television host and author Pierre Berton	N/A
1195	June 16, 1967	Carol Lawrence, Corbett Monica, Episcopalian bishop James Pike	Johnny Tillotson
1196	June 19, 1967	Charlie Manna	Leslie Uggams, Johnny Tillotson
1197	June 20, 1967	Shelley Winters, Richard Pryor	N/A
1198	June 21, 1967	Hayley Mills	Luis Bonfa
1199	June 22, 1967	Joan Rivers, journalist Alden Whitman, author Morton Shulman	Louis Armstrong, Matt Monro
1200	June 23, 1967	Debbie Reynolds, Bill Dana, Rudy Gernreich	Moe Koffman
1201	June 26, 1967	TBA	Georgia Brown
1202	June 27, 1967	Dick Cavett	Spanky and Our Gang
1203	June 28, 1967	Marni Nixon	N/A
1204	June 29, 1967	Rose Marie, Morey Amsterdam, Sandy Koufax	N/A
1205	June 30, 1967	Buddy Hackett	Buddy Rich, The Turtles

=== July ===
No.	Original release date	Guest(s)	Musical/entertainment guest(s)
1206	July 3, 1967	Barbara Nichols	N/A
A robot demonstration is presented.
1207	July 4, 1967	TBA	N/A
1208	July 5, 1967	Alan King, George Segal, Bill Moyers, Rose Marie	Hines, Hines and Dad
1209	July 6, 1967	New York City mayor John Lindsay, author William Redfield	Chris and Peter Allen
1210	July 7, 1967	Tony Randall, Oleg Cassini, Allen Funt	Johnny Mathis, Marilyn Maye
1211	July 10, 1967	Bob Newhart (Guest Host); Sen. Everett Dirksen, Norm Crosby	Billy Eckstine
Bob Newhart begins three weeks as guest host while Johnny Carson performs in Las Vegas.
1212	July 11, 1967	Bob Newhart (Guest Host); Ruth Dayan, wife of Israeli military leader, Moshe Dayan; Jackie Vernon	N/A
1213	July 12, 1967	Bob Newhart (Guest Host); Yvonne Craig	Janice Ian, Erroll Garner
1214	July 13, 1967	Bob Newhart (Guest Host); Edith Evans, Aaron Sussman	Jane Morgan
1215	July 14, 1967	Bob Newhart (Guest Host); Bob Thomas	N/A
1216	July 17, 1967	Bob Newhart (Guest Host)	The Young Americans
1217	July 18, 1967	Bob Newhart (Guest Host); Charlie Weaver; Tammy Grimes	N/A
1218	July 19, 1967	Bob Newhart (Guest Host); author Leatrice Fountain	Simon & Garfunkel
1219	July 20, 1967	Bob Newhart (Guest Host)	N/A
1220	July 21, 1967	Bob Newhart (Guest Host)	N/A
1221	July 24, 1967	Bob Newhart (Guest Host); Ashley Montagu	Al Hirt
1222	July 25, 1967	Bob Newhart (Guest Host); author and teacher Haim Ginott	N/A
1223	July 26, 1967	Bob Newhart (Guest Host)	N/A
1224	July 27, 1967	Bob Newhart (Guest Host); Carl Reiner, Joe Garagiola	N/A
1225	July 28, 1967	Bob Newhart (Guest Host)	N/A
1226	July 31, 1967	Vice President Hubert Humphrey, Eartha Kitt, psychiatrist and author Dr. Renatus Hartogs	Guy Lombardo and His Royal Canadians with vocalist Carmen Lombardo
Johnny Carson returns after three weeks off to perform in Las Vegas.

=== August ===
No.	Original release date	Guest(s)	Musical/entertainment guest(s)
1227	August 1, 1967	TBA	N/A
1228	August 2, 1967	Louis Nye, Sharon Tate	N/A
1229	August 3, 1967	Betty Grable, author and NASA scientist Robert Jastrow	Victor Borge
1230	August 4, 1967	Agnes Moorehead, Jose Greco, hairdresser Mark Traynor	Baja Marimba Band. Joan Baez
1231	August 7, 1967	Vincent Price, author Joe Dicerto	Sam the Sham
1232	August 8, 1967	Myron Cohen	N/A
1233	August 9, 1967	TBA	N/A
1234	August 10, 1967	Ted Mack, Whitey Ford	N/A
1235	August 11, 1967	Ayn Rand, Florence Henderson	The Temptations
1236	August 14, 1967	TBA	N/A
1237	August 15, 1967	Tab Hunter, Sally Rand	The Staple Singers
1238	August 16, 1967	Cyril Ritchard, Eve Arden	Louis Armstrong
1239	August 17, 1967	Gymnast Muriel Davis, Sam Blum	N/A
1240	August 18, 1967	Hugh Hefner, Buster Crabbe	N/A
1241	August 21, 1967	George Kirby, Mort Sahl, Carol Lawrence	Liberace
During the show, Lawrence suffered a cut lip after falling.
1242	August 22, 1967	George Carlin, Nina Wayne	Eddy Arnold
1243	August 23, 1967	TBA	Della Reese
1244	August 24, 1967	Bob Considine	Lynn Kellogg
1245	August 25, 1967	Buddy Hackett	N/A
1246	August 28, 1967	Twiggy	N/A
1247	August 29, 1967	Kaye Ballard, Bill Stern, Curtis & Tracy	Ray Price
1248	August 30, 1967	Dr. Richard Evans	Elias & Shaw
1249	August 31, 1967	Willie Tyler	N/A

=== September ===
No.	Original release date	Guest(s)	Musical/entertainment guest(s)
1250	September 1, 1967	Six Miss America contestants are guests	N/A
1251	September 4, 1967	TBA	N/A
1252	September 5, 1967	Steve Allen, Peter Ustinov	N/A
1253	September 6, 1967	Joe Namath, Sam Levenson	N/A
1254	September 7, 1967	TBA	Billy Eckstine, Lesley Gore
1255	September 8, 1967	TBA	N/A
1256	September 11, 1967	Author and Episcopalian bishop James Pike, Curtiss & Tracy	N/A
1257	September 12, 1967	Jack Valenti	N/A
1258	September 13, 1967	Joan Rivers, Robert Horton, Dr. Dana Greeley, head of the Unitarian Church	N/A
1259	September 14, 1967	Lee Marvin	Marvin Gaye and Tammi Terrell
Exactly one month later, Terrell collapsed on stage and was diagnosed with a brain tumor.
1260	September 15, 1967	NASA scientist Dr. Robert Jastrow	N/A
1261	September 18, 1967	Gene Rayburn (Guest Host); Bart Starr	N/A
1262	September 19, 1967	Gene Rayburn (Guest Host); Rod Serling, Orson Bean, Jane Holzer	Milt Trenier, Micki Lynd
1263	September 20, 1967	Gene Rayburn (Guest Host); Lynn Redgrave and husband John Clark	N/A
1264	September 21, 1967	Gene Rayburn (Guest Host); Ben Gazzara	N/A
1265	September 22, 1967	Gene Rayburn (Guest Host); Eli Wallach and Ann Jackson, David and Goliath	David Houston
1266	September 25, 1967	(FROM LOS ANGELES) Bob Hope	The Fifth Dimension
1267	September 26, 1967	(FROM LOS ANGELES) Don Adams, Sherry Jackson, Maharishi Mahesh	N/A
1268	September 27, 1967	(FROM LOS ANGELES) Leo Gorcey, Rose Marie, Sidney Miller	N/A
1269	September 28, 1967	(FROM LOS ANGELES) Bill Cosby	N/A
1270	September 29, 1967	(FROM LOS ANGELES) James Garner, Bob Newhart, Parnelli Jones	N/A
Films of Johnny Carson driving the STP Turbocar at the Indianapolis Motor Speedway were shown.

=== October ===
No.	Original release date	Guest(s)	Musical/entertainment guest(s)
1271	October 2, 1967	(FROM LOS ANGELES) Jack Benny, George Burns, Zsa Zsa Gabor, Edward Everett Horton	N/A
Johnny Carson celebrated his fifth anniversary of the show.
1272	October 3, 1967	(FROM LOS ANGELES) Desi Arnaz, Phil Harris, Bill Dana	The Jefferson Airplane
1273	October 4, 1967	(FROM LOS ANGELES) Don Rickles, Rose Marie, Sidney Miller, Lassie	N/A
1274	October 5, 1967	(FROM LOS ANGELES) Henry Fonda, Sandra Dee, men's hair stylist Marengo	N/A
Fashions from the I. Magnin store in San Francisco are shown.
1275	October 6, 1967	(FROM LOS ANGELES) Danny Thomas, Carl Ballantine, psychiatrist Dore Miller	Eddy Arnold, Mother Tucker
1276	October 9, 1967	New York City mayor John Lindsay, Diane Cilento	N/A
Doc Severinsen becomes the show's musical director, replacing Milton DeLugg.
1277	October 10, 1967	Alan King, Sen. Stuart Symington	N/A
1278	October 11, 1967	Carl Reiner, Elsa Lanchester, Erma Bombeck	Louis Armstrong
1279	October 12, 1967	Angie Dickinson, Dr. Norman Vincent Peale	Little Dion
1280	October 13, 1967	George Carlin, Sarah Churchill, men's hairdresser Marengo	The Walter Wonderly Trio
1281	October 16, 1967	World Series Most Valuable Player Bob Gibson, George Hamilton, Orson Bean, Monique Van Vooren	N/A
1282	October 17, 1967	Anne Baxter, Rich Little	N/A
1283	October 18, 1967	Carl Yastrzemski	N/A
1284	October 19, 1967	Carol Lawrence, NASA scientist Robert Jastrow	N/A
1285	October 20, 1967	Orson Bean (Guest Host); Betty Grable, Pat Henry, Ashley Montagu, men's hairdresser Marengo	Sarah Vaughan
1286	October 23, 1967	TBA	N/A
1287	October 24, 1967	Psychiatrist Dr. Marvin Ziporyn	N/A
1288	October 25, 1967	General Omar Bradley, Walter Winchell	Aretha Franklin
1289	October 26, 1967	Ayn Rand, Monique Van Vooren, Charlie Manna	Ella Fitzgerald
1290	October 27, 1967	Peggy Cass, George Hamilton, Pat McCormick	N/A
1291	October 30, 1967	Bob Newhart (Guest Host); George Kirby	N/A
1292	October 31, 1967	Bob Newhart (Guest Host) Mort Sahl, Ricardo Montalbán	N/A

=== November ===
No.	Original release date	Guest(s)	Musical/entertainment guest(s)
1293	November 1, 1967	Bob Newhart (Guest Host); General Omar Bradley, Joan Bennett, Jackie Vernon	N/A
1294	November 2, 1967	Bob Newhart (Guest Host); Bob Hope, Angie Dickinson, Stiller and Meara, Dr. D. Bono	Robert Morse
1295	November 3, 1967	Bob Newhart (Guest Host); Peter Ustinov, Mort Sahl, George Plimpton	Count Basie
1296	November 6, 1967	Bob Newhart (Guest Host); Rich Little, former president of EngenderHealth H. Curtis Wood, Jr.	Vicki Carr
1297	November 7, 1967	Bob Newhart (Guest Host); William F. Buckley, Jr., Orson Bean, Dina Merrill, Tommy Leonetti	N/A
1298	November 8, 1967	Bob Newhart (Guest Host); Barbara Feldon; Norm Crosby; Irwin Corey	Jerry Vale
1299	November 9, 1967	Bob Newhart (Guest Host); Fran Tarkenton, Joe Namath, John Forsythe, Ron Carey, Yael Dayan	Alice Playten
1300	November 10, 1967	Bob Newhart (Guest Host); Richard Chamberlain, Soupy Sales, Joe Garagiola	N/A
1301	November 13, 1967	Bob Newhart (Guest Host); Carol Channing, Phyllis Newman	N/A
1302	November 14, 1967	Bob Newhart (Guest Host); Herb Caen	N/A
1303	November 15, 1967	Bob Newhart (Guest Host); Costanza Cuccaro, winner of the Metropolitan Opera contest	Jan Peerce
1304	November 16, 1967	Bob Newhart (Guest Host)	N/A
1305	November 17, 1967	Bob Newhart (Guest Host); Bishop Fulton J. Sheen, Bill Dana, Scott A. Hall	The Fifth Dimension
1306	November 20, 1967	Mel Brooks, Hines, Hines and Dad, Chief of Protocol of the United States James Symington	N/A
1307	November 21, 1967	Pat McCormick, Curtis and Tracy	Joan Baez
1308	November 22, 1967	Richard Nixon, Lorne Greene	Vikki Carr
1309	November 23, 1967	TBA	N/A
1310	November 24, 1967	Don Rickles, Joan Rivers, Monti Rock III	Ray Price
1311	November 27, 1967	George Kirby, Shari Lewis, Lord Anthony Snowdon	N/A
1312	November 28, 1967	Arnold Palmer	Lulu
1313	November 29, 1967	Alan King	N/A
1314	November 30, 1967	Phyllis Diller	Tony Bennett, Nancy Sinatra

=== December ===
No.	Original release date	Guest(s)	Musical/entertainment guest(s)
1315	December 1, 1967	Peggy Cass, Gig Young, Bosley Crowther	Sarah Vaughan
1316	December 4, 1967	Alan King	Kenny Rankin
1317	December 5, 1967	Mamie Van Doren, Ed Giacomin, Boom Boom Geoffrion, Clifton Fadiman	N/A
1318	December 6, 1967	Flip Wilson	Mara Lynn Brown
1319	December 7, 1967	Mel Brooks, Rich Little, Mitzi Gaynor, Lee Beery	The Serendipity Singers
1320	December 8, 1967	Louis Nye, Phil Foster	Nancy Sinatra
1321	December 11, 1967	Barbara Walters, John Byner	Marilyn Maye
1322	December 12, 1967	Stanley Kramer, Claire Trevor, Orson Bean, Linda Cristal	Chris and Peter Allen
1323	December 13, 1967	John Glenn, Ayn Rand, Lynn Devore	Teddy Neely
1324	December 14, 1967	Hal Roach, Bill Moyers, Carol Lawrence, New York City Fire Commissioner Robert O. Lowery	N/A
Roach showed films of Laurel and Hardy.
1325	December 15, 1967	James Coburn, Eva Gabor, Charlie Callas, painter Jan de Ruth	Pearl Bailey
1326	December 18, 1967	Alan King (Guest Host); Samantha Eggar	Anthony Newley
1327	December 19, 1967	Alan King (Guest Host); Robert Ryan, Lynn Redgrave, Claudia McNeil, Marsh & Adams, Allon Schoper	Joao Gilberto
1328	December 20, 1967	Alan King (Guest Host); Jackie Clarke	Buddy Greco
1329	December 21, 1967	Alan King (Guest Host); Nipsey Russell	N/A
1330	December 22, 1967	Phyllis Diller (Guest Host); Salvador Dalí, Milt Kamen, Abigail Van Buren, Stan Kann, Ward Donovan	N/A
1331	December 25, 1967	Victor Borge (Guest Host)	Leonid Hambro
1332	December 26, 1967	Victor Borge (Guest Host); Joel Grey, Geraldine Chapman	N/A
1333	December 27, 1967	Victor Borge (Guest Host); Muriel Humphrey	Mary Costa
1334	December 28, 1967	Victor Borge (Guest Host); Morey Amsterdam, The Jose Molina Dancers	N/A
1335	December 29, 1967	Victor Borge (Guest Host)	Cab Calloway and his daughter Chris
