= List of The Tonight Show Starring Johnny Carson episodes (1964) =

- No. of episodes: 260

Release
- Original network: NBC

Season chronology
- ← Previous; 1963 episodes Next → 1965 episodes

The following is a list of episodes of the television series The Tonight Show Starring Johnny Carson which aired in 1964. In October, 1962 Johnny Carson took over as host of the show from the previous host Jack Paar.

== January ==
No.	Original release date	Guest(s)	Musical/entertainment guest(s)
313	January 1, 1964	Corbett Monica, Sam Levenson	Anna Moffo, Ken Carson
314	January 2, 1964	Henny Youngman, Robert Preston, Selma Diamond	N/A
315	January 3, 1964	Al Capp, Betsy Palmer	N/A
316	January 6, 1964	Jan Murray, Arlene Francis, Harry Golden	N/A
317	January 7, 1964	Eva Gabor, David Doyle, Rene Lavand, Hans Holzer	N/A
318	January 8, 1964	The New Group	Nancy Ames, Florian ZaBach
319	January 9, 1964	Henry Morgan, Anne Jackson	The New Group, Gene Biancho
320	January 10, 1964	Phil Foster, Gloria DeHaven	Vaughn Monroe
321	January 13, 1964	Jan Sterling	Al Hirt
322	January 14, 1964	Hedda Hopper, Jack Douglas and wife Reiko, Sam Levenson	Jonah Jones
323	January 15, 1964	Kaye Ballard, Slim Pickens, Jonathan Miller	Carmen McRae
324	January 16, 1964	Arthur Godfrey, Annie Farge, American Medical Association president Edward Annis	Anita Bryant, George London
325	January 17, 1964	George Jessel, Leo Durocher, Gerald Peters	Nancy Ames, The Tarriers
326	January 20, 1964	Eva Gabor, Dr. Rose Franzblau	The Big 3
327	January 21, 1964	Rosemary Clooney, John Bubbles	David Atkinson
328	January 22, 1964	Al Capp, Merriman Smith	John Gary, Jack Haskell
329	January 23, 1964	Arlene Dahl	Robert Merrill, Jan Peerce
330	January 24, 1964	George Jessel, Angela Lansbury, Lee Remick	The Tarriers
331	January 27, 1964	Louis Nye, Gary Lockwood	Al Hirt, Nancy Berg
332	January 28, 1964	Keenan Wynn, Howard Morris	Joe Williams
333	January 29, 1964	Allan Sherman, model Wilhelmina, Ivan Sanderson, Teddy Greaves	Dolores Hawkins
334	January 30, 1964	David Frost, Selma Diamond	Frank D'Rone
335	January 31, 1964	Florence Henderson, Hines and Ford	The Romeros

== February ==
No.	Original release date	Guest(s)	Musical/entertainment guest(s)
336	February 3, 1964	Woody Allen, Hans Conried, Nancy Berg	Louis Prima
337	February 4, 1964	Carol Lawrence	Joe Bushkin
338	February 5, 1964	Al Capp, John Bubbles, Hungarian actress Zsuzsanna Bartha	Lovelace Watkins,
339	February 6, 1964	Jimmy Breslin, Jack Douglas and wife Reiko	Miriam Makeba
340	February 7, 1964	Henny Youngman	Sam Cooke, The Coronados
341	February 10, 1964	Keenan Wynn, Woody Allen, Louise Lasser, Don Stewart	Si Zentner
342	February 11, 1964	Mel Brooks, Larry Blyden, Eva Gabor	Johnny Nash
343	February 12, 1964	Allan Sherman, Kathryn Crosby	N/A
344	February 13, 1964	Ed McMahon and Skitch Henderson guest hosts, Bill Hayes	The Highwaymen
345	February 14, 1964	Ed McMahon and Skitch Henderson guest hosts, Henny Youngman	Eileen Barton
346	February 17, 1964	(FROM LOS ANGELES) Mayor Sam Yorty, James Stewart, Billy Grady, Phyllis Diller	N/A
347	February 18, 1964	(FROM LOS ANGELES) Ernest Borgnine, Laurence Harvey, Rose Marie, Phil Harris	N/A
348	February 19, 1964	(FROM LOS ANGELES) Lee J. Cobb, Carol Lawrence	N/A
349	February 20, 1964	(FROM LOS ANGELES) Debbie Reynolds, Terry-Thomas, Stan Freberg	N/A
350	February 21, 1964	(FROM LOS ANGELES) Dale Robertson, Betty Hutton	N/A
351	February 24, 1964	(FROM LOS ANGELES) Jayne Mansfield, California governor Edmond G. Brown	N/A
352	February 25, 1964	(FROM LOS ANGELES) Danny Thomas, Roberta Linn	Patti Page, Freddie Bell
353	February 26, 1964	(FROM LOS ANGELES) Nick Adams, Rhonda Fleming	Joe and Eddie
354	February 27, 1964	(FROM LOS ANGELES) Ernest Borgnine, Carol Lawrence, Don Drysdale, Mike Minor	N/A
355	February 28, 1964	(FROM LOS ANGELES) George Jessel, January Jones, Walter O'Keefe	N/A

== March ==
No.	Original release date	Guest(s)	Musical/entertainment guest(s)
356	March 2, 1964	Eva Gabor, Milt Kamen, Peter Cook	Felicia Sanders
357	March 3, 1964	Henny Youngman, Mary Ann Mobley, Gerald Peters	Eileen Barton
358	March 4, 1964	Alan King	Nancy Ames
359	March 5, 1964	Sheilah Graham, Richard Chamberlain, Robert Walker, Connie Stevens, Thelma Ritter, Tippi Hedren	N/A
Photoplay magazine Gold Medal honors for movies and television are presented.
360	March 6, 1964	Dick Shawn	June Valli
361	March 9, 1964	Louis Nye	The Modernaires, Yvonne Constant, Ray Eberle, Tex Beneke
362	March 10, 1964	Peter O'Toole, Phyllis Newman, Henry Morgan, Kenny Coleman	N/A
O'Toole, suffering from exhaustion, abruptly left and fainted backstage.
363	March 11, 1964	Irwin Corey, Tessie O'Shea	Sarah Vaughan
364	March 12, 1964	John Davis Lodge, Dr. Joyce Brothers, Sam Levenson	The Clancy Brothers
365	March 13, 1964	Dirk Bogarde, Eva Gabor, Marlin Perkins	Johnny Nash
366	March 16, 1964	Dick Shawn, Selma Diamond, Bernard Berelson	The Highwaymen
367	March 17, 1964	Pat O'Brien, Carol Lawrence	Anita Bryant
368	March 18, 1964	Corbett Monica	Lionel Hampton
369	March 19, 1964	Henny Youngman	Jan Peerce, Caterina Valente
370	March 20, 1964	Myron Cohen, Bonita Granville	Carol Sloane
371	March 23, 1964	Steve Lawrence, Milt Kamen, Annie Farge, painter Jan De Ruth	N/A
372	March 24, 1964	Tessie O'Shea	Billy Daniels
373	March 25, 1964	Andre Previn	N/A
374	March 26, 1964	TBA	The Big 3
Easter Parade Fashion Show.
375	March 27, 1964	George Jessel, Gore Vidal, Hilda Brauner	Kathy Woodruff
376	March 30, 1964	Don Knotts	Ferrante and Teicher, Yvonne Constant, The Willis Sisters
377	March 31, 1964	Woody Allen, Phyllis Newman, Vance Packard	John Gary

== April ==
No.	Original release date	Guest(s)	Musical/entertainment guest(s)
378	April 1, 1964	TBA	Ethel Ennis
379	April 2, 1964	Eli Wallach and wife Anne Jackson, Kaye Ballard	Al Martino, Charles Aznavour
380	April 3, 1964	Al Capp, Irwin Corey, Annie Farge	The Womenfolk
381	April 6, 1964	Florence Henderson, Milt Kamen, Pete Martin	Wayne Newton
382	April 7, 1964	Dr. Joyce Brothers, Irwin Corey	The Montana Men
383	April 8, 1964	Julie London, Alan King, Dawn Nickerson	Moe Koffman
384	April 9, 1964	Rudy Vallee, Eydie Gorme, Dr. Robert Baird	Woody Herman
385	April 10, 1964	Philip Stern	Kathy Woodruff
386	April 13, 1964	Cecil Barker	N/A
387	April 14, 1964	Gore Vidal, Luise Rainer	Jan Peerce, Freddie Bell, Roberta Linn
388	April 15, 1964	Mamie Van Doren, Larry Storch, Dr. Jonathan Karas	Linda Hopkins
389	April 16, 1964	Allan Sherman, Ivan Tors, Stuart Foster	Dolores Hawkins
390	April 17, 1964	Lee Tracy, Stuart Foster, Peter Hurkos	N/A
391	April 20, 1964	Eva Gabor	Charles Aznavour
392	April 21, 1964	Mel Brooks, Rod Serling, Eydie Gorme	Chuck Jackson
393	April 22, 1964	Arlene Dahl, Henry Morgan, Jake Ehrlich	Pete Fountain
394	April 23, 1964	Selma Diamond, Barbara Lang, Corbett Monica	N/A
395	April 24, 1964	George Jessel, Floyd Patterson, Kaye Ballard	N/A
396	April 27, 1964	Milt Kamen, Bethel Leslie, Fred Wayne	Sue Raney
397	April 28, 1964	Robert Merrill, Merriman Smith	Dave Brubeck
398	April 29, 1964	Woody Allen, Leonard Spigelgass	The Barry Sisters, Nancy Ames
399	April 30, 1964	Shari Lewis, Marty Ingels	Hank Thompson, Toni Arden

== May ==
No.	Original release date	Guest(s)	Musical/entertainment guest(s)
400	May 1, 1964	Phil Foster, Sammy Renick	Vikki Carr
401	May 4, 1964	Pat O'Brien, Adam Keefe, June Valli, Marianne Means	Jan Peerce
402	May 5, 1964	David Doyle, Phil Foster	Joe Williams, Jane Morgan
403	May 6, 1964	Inga Swenson, Irwin Corey, Fredd Wayne	Nancy Wilson
404	May 7, 1964	Sammy Cahn, Felicia Sanders, Al Capp	Frankie Yankovic
405	May 8, 1964	Don Adams, Stan Musial, Jack Douglas and Reiko Douglas	Kathy Woodruff
406	May 11, 1964	Alan King, Harry Belafonte, Al Kelly, New York City Traffic Commissioner Henry Barnes	Patti Page
407	May 12, 1964	Telly Savalas, Corbett Monica	William Warfield, North American Air Defense Command Orchestra
408	May 13, 1964	Henry Morgan	Nina Simone
409	May 14, 1964	Carol Lawrence, Myron Cohen, Shirley Harmer	Jimmy Dean
410	May 15, 1964	Allen Funt, Terry-Thomas, Dickie Henderson	Robert Merrill
411	May 18, 1964	Don Adams, Eva Gabor, Richard Gehman, Barbara Hines	N/A
412	May 19, 1964	Marya Mannes, Dick Roman	N/A
413	May 20, 1964	Barbara Eden, Phil Foster, Dudley Moore,	N/A
414	May 21, 1964	Jerry Van Dyke, Muriel Davidson	Joey Heatherton
415	May 22, 1964	George Jessel, Eydie Gorme, Jack Bailey	N/A
416	May 25, 1964	Milt Kamen, Diahn Williams	Mel Torme, Al Hirt
417	May 26, 1964	Paul Newman, Larry Storch	N/A
418	May 27, 1964	Allan Sherman, Harry Golden	Della Reese
419	May 28, 1964	Andy Devine	Mike Minor
420	May 29, 1964	Terry-Thomas, Denise McLaglen, Eddie Lawrence	Mahalia Jackson

== June ==
No.	Original release date	Guest(s)	Musical/entertainment guest(s)
421	June 1, 1964	Lawrence Welk, Woody Allen, Louise Lasser	Johnny Cash
422	June 2, 1964	Henny Youngman, Boris Karloff	Pete Fountain and his Jazz Combo
423	June 3, 1964	Eva Gabor	Liberace, Shirley Harmer
424	June 4, 1964	Don Adams, Carol Lawrence, John Bubbles	The Modernaires
425	June 5, 1964	Jim Backus, Dr. Joyce Brothers, Roger Conklin	Carol Sloane
426	June 8, 1964	David Frost, Jack Douglas and Reiko Douglas, Rosette Shaw, Al Lamm	Patachou
427	June 9, 1964	Phil Foster, Shel Silverstein, Joan Bassie	The Searchers
428	June 10, 1964	George Jessel, Merriman Smith, Gia Scala, Susie Kaye	N/A
429	June 11, 1964	Irwin Corey, Jean Pierre Aumont, Dawn Nickerson	Marion Montgomery
430	June 12, 1964	Shari Lewis, Larry Storch, George Sidney	Erick Friedman, Burt Taylor
431	June 15, 1964	Al Capp, John Bubbles	Earl Wrightson, Lois Hunt, Denny Zeitlin
432	June 16, 1964	Patachou, Henry Morgan, Marya Mannes	N/A
433	June 17, 1964	Mel Brooks, Jack Albertson, Kathy Dolan, Marilyn Burroughs	N/A
434	June 18, 1964	David Merrick, Barbara Rush, Corbett Monica	N/A
435	June 19, 1964	Robert Merrill, Carroll Baker, Paul Anka, Don Alan	N/A
436	June 22, 1964	Milt Kamen, Zsa Zsa Gabor, Nick Adams	Kathy Woodruff
437	June 23, 1964	Jerry Van Dyke, Annie Farge, David Campbell Taws	Trini Lopez
438	June 24, 1964	Corbett Monica, Eydie Gorme, Don Cherry, Jose Bethancourt (né José P. Bethancourt; 1906–1978)	N/A
439	June 25, 1964	Lorne Greene, Alan King, Marya Mannes, Jeff Donnell	N/A
440	June 26, 1964	Rise Stevens	Mills Brothers
441	June 29, 1964	Jack Albertson, Eva Gabor	Trini Lopez
442	June 30, 1964	Shel Silverstein, Emmaline Henry	Mike Minor

== July ==
No.	Original release date	Guest(s)	Musical/entertainment guest(s)
443	July 1, 1964	Tony Martin, Yogi Berra, Joe Garagiola, Ziva Rodann	The J's with Jamie
444	July 2, 1964	George Kirby, Ruta Lee, Selma Diamond	N/A
445	July 3, 1964	George Jessel, Annie Farge, Frank Fontaine	Joanne Val
Shari Alter & Corky Carroll perform a skating demonstration.
446	July 6, 1964	Woody Allen guest host	N/A
Johnny Carson began a four-week engagement in Las Vegas.
447	July 7, 1964	Woody Allen guest host	N/A
448	July 8, 1964	Woody Allen guest host	N/A
449	July 9, 1964	Woody Allen guest host	N/A
450	July 10, 1964	Woody Allen guest host; Edie Adams, Tom Poston, Louise Lasser	Count Basie
451	July 13, 1964	Ed McMahon and Skitch Henderson guest hosts; Milt Kamen, Lauritz Melchior, Anna Maria Alberghetti, David Campbell Taws	Nancy Ames
N–A	July 14, 1964	Pre-empted by Republican National Convention.	N/A
N–A	July 15, 1964	Pre-empted by Republican National Convention.	N/A
452	July 16, 1964	Ed McMahon and Skitch Henderson guest hosts; Marty Ingels, Jill St. John, Larry Peerce, Bobby Vinton	Toni Arden
453	July 17, 1964	Ed McMahon and Skitch Henderson guest hosts; Annie Farge, Paul Lynde, Phil Foster	Joe Bushkin
454	July 20, 1964	Pat Boone guest host; Debbie Reynolds, Jack Palance, Frank Gorshin	N/A
455	July 21, 1964	Pat Boone guest host; Steve Lawrence and Eydie Gorme, Carl Ballantine, Dave Barry	Red Foley
456	July 22, 1964	Pat Boone guest host; Robert Taylor, Selma Diamond	Carmel Quinn, Jan Peerce
457	July 23, 1964	Pat Boone guest host; Edie Adams, Al Capp, Gypsy Boots	Roberta Sherwood
458	July 24, 1964	Pat Boone guest host; Allan Sherman, Beatrice Lillie, Sammy Cahn, Shirley Boone (Pat's wife)	N/A
459	July 27, 1964	Groucho Marx guest host	Pearl Bailey
460	July 28, 1964	Groucho Marx guest host, Bill Cosby	N/A
461	July 29, 1964	Groucho Marx guest host	N/A
462	July 30, 1964	Groucho Marx guest host; Phyllis Newman	N/A
463	July 31, 1964	Groucho Marx guest host	N/A
Broadcast partially interrupted for news special: "Ranger VII, Closeup of the Moon".

== August ==
No.	Original release date	Guest(s)	Musical/entertainment guest(s)
464	August 3, 1964	Allan Sherman guest host; Bill Cosby, Stefanie Powers, Evelyne Axell	Enzo Stuarti, Cy Coleman
465	August 4, 1964	Steve Lawrence and Eydie Gorme co-guest host, Nipsey Russell, Joe Garagiola, Allan Sherman, European entrants in the International Beauty competition	Tony Bennett
This episode was interrupted for an address by President Lyndon Johnson over the Gulf of Tonkin incident.
466	August 5, 1964	Ed McMahon and Skitch Henderson co-guest hosts; Roger Miller	Sammy Cahn, Patachou, Beers Family
467	August 6, 1964	Phyllis Diller, Henry Morgan, Dr. Robert Franklyn,	Karen Rondell, Carole Reinhart
Johnny Carson returns after one month working-vacation in Las Vegas.
468	August 7, 1964	Bill Cosby, Merriman Smith	Abbe Lane, Shani Wallis, accordionist Art Van Damme
469	August 10, 1964	Henny Youngman, Harry Hirschfield, Mrs. M.S. Minier	Connie Francis, Sue Raney
470	August 11, 1964	Eydie Gorme, Maxie Rosenbloom	Marion Colby
471	August 12, 1964	Robert Merrill, Phyllis Newman	Jan Peerce
472	August 13, 1964	Phyllis Diller	Joe Williams
473	August 14, 1964	George Jessel	Lionel Hampton
474	August 17, 1964	Barbara Eden, Al Capp, Harry Golden	Karen Rondell
"Johnny Chan" sketch with Barbara Eden.
475	August 18, 1964	Bill Cosby	Tamiko Jones
476	August 19, 1964	Stefanie Powers, Selma Diamond, Dr. Joyce Brothers	N/A
477	August 20, 1964	Florence Henderson, Susan Barrett	N/A
478	August 21, 1964	Shari Lewis, Henny Youngman, Sam Donahue, Helen Forrest, Charlie Shavers, Jeannie Thomas	Tommy Dorsey, Keely Smith, The Pied Pipers, Frank Sinatra Jr.
479	August 24, 1964	Mel Torme, Ruta Lee	N/A
480	August 25, 1964	Phil Foster, Dinah Williams	N/A
481	August 26, 1964	Kaye Ballard, Bill Cosby	Jerry Vale
482	August 27, 1964	Allen Sherman, Eva Gabor	Jan Peerce
483	August 28, 1964	Merriman Smith, Marty Ingels	N/A
484	August 31, 1964	Don Adams	Timo Yuri

== September ==
No.	Original release date	Guest(s)	Musical/entertainment guest(s)
485	September 1, 1964	John Bubbles	Stan Zabka
486	September 2, 1964	Al Capp, Dr. Richard Evans	N/A
487	September 3, 1964	Jan Peerce, Barry Sisters	N/A
488	September 4, 1964	Marie Wilson, Henry Morgan	N/A
489	September 7, 1964	Alan King (guest host), Shelley Winters	Shirley Harmer
490	September 8, 1964	Michael Landon, June Valli	N/A
491	September 9, 1964	Dennis Weaver, Jan Peerce	N/A
492	September 10, 1964	James Franciscus, Gig Young	Sarah Vaughan
493	September 11, 1964	Lada Edmonds Jr.	N/A
494	September 14, 1964	Four Step Brothers, Ruth Price, Abbe Lane, Carol Lawrence, Fess Parker	Interludes
495	September 15, 1964	Brian Kelly, Louis Nye, Joan Tolliver	N/A
496	September 16, 1964	Bill Dana, Kaye Ballard	N/A
497	September 17, 1964	Robert Vaughn, Robert Merrill	N/A
498	September 18, 1964	Louis Nye	N/A
499	September 21, 1964	Phil Foster	Pearl Bailey
Johnny and Pearl perform "Our Love Is Here To Stay".
500	September 22, 1964	Joe E. Lewis, Jack Benny, Jane Wyman	N/A
501	September 23, 1964	Eva Gabor, Oleg Cassini	Carmen McRae, The Hi-Lo's
502	September 24, 1964	Leon Bibb	N/A
503	September 25, 1964	Henry Morgan, Gordon MacRae and Sheila MacRae, Leon A. Harris	Felicia Sanders
504	September 28, 1964	Joey Heatherton, John Bubbles, Benson and Mann	January Jones
505	September 29, 1964	Kaye Ballard	Jeff Turner
506	September 30, 1964	Jack Klugman, Fredd Wayne	N/A

== October ==
No.	Original release date	Guest(s)	Musical/entertainment guest(s)
507	October 1, 1964	George Jessel, Sophie Tucker, Tony Bennett, Tony Martin, Joe E. Lewis	Harry James & his orchestra
Second anniversary show.
508	October 2, 1964	Buddy Hackett, Ina Balin, Harold Lloyd, Harold Lloyd Jr.	Mel Torme
509	October 5, 1964	Milt Kamen	Oscar Brown
510	October 6, 1964	Zsa Zsa Gabor, Corbett Monica	N/A
Home movie of Johnny and son Chris returning to Norfolk, Nebraska.
511	October 7, 1964	Florence Henderson, Carmen McRae, Dr. Joyce Brothers, Professor Irwin Corey	N/A
512	October 8, 1964	Jill St. John, William Walker	N/A
513	October 9, 1964	Carol Sloane, Charles Aznavour	N/A
514	October 12, 1964	Phyllis Diller, Ed Ames, Ruta Lee	N/A
515	October 13, 1964	Marlin Perkins, Joe Garagiola, Kay Starr, Kaye Ballard	N/A
516	October 14, 1964	Phyllis Newman, Sam Levenson, Robert Merrill, Sam Snead	N/A
517	October 15, 1964	The Brothers Four, George Jessel, Dorothy Lamour, Hans Conried	N/A
518	October 16, 1964	TBA	N/A
519	October 19, 1964	The McGuire Sisters, Milt Kamen, Ed Ames	N/A
520	October 20, 1964	Shari Lewis, Jan Peerce	N/A
521	October 21, 1964	Phyllis McGinley, Selma Diamond, Allan Jones	N/A
522	October 22, 1964	Nina Wayne, Allan Sherman	N/A
523	October 23, 1964	Eydie Gorme, Allen & Rossi	Oscar Peterson Trio
524	October 26, 1964	Jan Murray (Guest Host); Sammy Davis Jr., James Garner, Mel Allen	N/A
525	October 27, 1964	Henry Morgan, Bill Sands, Marion Lorne	Swingle Singers
526	October 28, 1964	Earl Fatha Hines, Phil Ford and Mimi Hines	Tony Bennett
527	October 29, 1964	Debbie Reynolds, Keely Smith, John Bubbles	Marion McPartland
528	October 30, 1964	Kaye Ballard, Milton Berle's Royal Quartet, Buddy Greco	N/A

== November ==
No.	Original release date	Guest(s)	Musical/entertainment guest(s)
529	November 2, 1964	Henny Youngman, Rita Moreno	Ray McKinley, Delores Hawkins
(11/3/64 pre-empted for NBC News election night coverage).
530	November 5, 1964	Rita Moreno, Telly Savalas, Godfrey Cambridge, Norm Crosby	N/A
531	November 6, 1964	Alan King, Eddie Baxter	Victor Borge
532	November 9, 1964	Barrie Chase, Bill Dana	N/A
533	November 10, 1964	Bill Cosby, Marion Lorne	Ruggiero Ricci, Tamiko Jones
534	November 11, 1964	John Bubbles	Frankie Randall
535	November 12, 1964	Richard Chamberlain, George Jessel	N/A
536	November 13, 1964	Florence Henderson, Bill Hayes	N/A
537	November 16, 1964	Rosemary Clooney, Arthur Barry	Randy Sparks
538	November 17, 1964	Robert Merrill	Kaye Ballard
539	November 18, 1964	Bob Hope, Deborah Kerr, Nina Wayne, Peter Viertel	N/A
540	November 19, 1964	Pete Barbutti	N/A
541	November 20, 1964	Phil Ford, Mimi Hines, Allan Sherman	N/A
542	November 23, 1964	Sammy Davis Jr. (Guest Host); Robert Kennedy, Peter Lawford	Della Reese
543	November 24, 1964	Lorne Greene, Barbara Windsor, Leslie Caron	N/A
544	November 25, 1964	Eva Gabor, Laura Green, John Megiver	N/A
545	November 26, 1964	Ed Ames, Sam Levenson	Ethel Ennis
546	November 27, 1964	Tessie O'Shea, Gabe Dell	N/A
547	November 30, 1964	Shelley Berman, John Henry Faulk, Diahn Williams	Kathy Woodruff

== December ==
No.	Original release date	Guest(s)	Musical/entertainment guest(s)
548	December 1, 1964	Milt Kamen, Gore Vidal, Al Capp	Jane Morgan, Gene Stridel
549	December 2, 1964	Florence Henderson, Pat O'Brien, Ernie Terrell, Davide de St. Vena	Jack Haskell, Diahn Williams
550	December 3, 1964	Bill Cosby, Phil Foster, Julie Bennett, Look Magazine All-American Football Team	Marni Nixon
551	December 4, 1964	Pierre Salinger, Stefanie Powers, Jerry Van Dyke, The Appletons	Tony Martin
552	December 7, 1964	Milton Berle (Guest Host); Sid Stone, Sammy Davis Jr., Jimmy Van Heusen	Steve Lawrence, Della Reese
553	December 8, 1964	Milt Kamen, Al Capp, Oriana Fallaci	N/A
554	December 9, 1964	Yvonne Constant, Jack Pepper, Debbie Drake, Jack E. Leonard	Pete Fountain Group
555	December 10, 1964	Jan Peerce, Johnny Dankworth	The Lettermen
556	December 11, 1964	Arthur Treacher, Isaac Stern, Nancy Berg	Carol Sloane, Yo-Yo Ma
557	December 14, 1964	Bill Cosby, Shel Silverstein	Paula Wayne, Michel Legrand
558	December 15, 1964	Arlene Dahl, Robert Coote	Steve Allen, Morgana King
559	December 16, 1964	Henry Morgan, Minnesota Fats, Campfire girl Linette Bennett	N/A
560	December 17, 1964	John and Hayley Mills, Jayne Mansfield, Phyllis Diller	Modern Jazz Quartet
561	December 18, 1964	Robert Goulet, Henny Youngman, Jesse Oshea, Bonnie Jacobs, Lt. Cornelius Behan	N/A
562	December 21, 1964	Walter Sullivan, Alan King	Sarah Vaughan
563	December 22, 1964	Eva Gabor, Freddy Quinn, Myron Cohen, Murray Zaret	Shirley Harmer, Rosette Shaw
564	December 23, 1964	Tony Bennett, Corbett Monica, Jan de Ruth	N/A
565	December 25, 1964	Hugh Downs (Guest Host); Sam Levenson	N/A
566	December 28, 1964	Corbett Monica	Ferrante and Teicher
567	December 29, 1964	George Jessel, Jack E. Leonard, Dr. Joyce Brothers	N/A
568	December 30, 1964	Norm Crosby, Selma Diamond, Robert Merrill, Harry Golden	Art Van Damme
569	December 31, 1964	Jan Peerce, Jayne Mansfield, Buddy Hackett	N/A
