= I Had a Ball =

- Original Playbill
- Music: Jack Lawrence; Stan Freeman
- Lyrics: Jack Lawrence; Stan Freeman
- Book: Jerome Chodorov
- Productions: 1964 Broadway

I Had a Ball is a musical with a book by Jerome Chodorov and music and lyrics by Jack Lawrence and Stan Freeman. It starred Buddy Hackett, and featured Richard Kiley and Karen Morrow.

== Plot overview ==
Set on the Coney Island Boardwalk, it focuses on matchmaking grifter turned fortune teller Garside, who tries to set up his friend, fellow grifter and recent parolee Stan, with Wonder Wheel owner/operator Jeannie. Garside finds his crystal ball is real, as it foretells Stan falling in love with former Coney Island hawker and man-eater Addie (who's returned to the alley while on the prowl for rich husband number four), and Jeannie falling in love with Brooks, a loan shark to whom Garside owes a hundred bucks (even though he only borrowed four). Garside watches the mismatched couples meet while getting dragged off to prison by Officer Millhauser (for running a fortune telling scam) ending the first act. Other characters include Ma Maloney, who heads the Alley Gang: Joe the Muzzler, Osaka Moto, and Gimlet. Act II finds the successful couples returning the day Garside comes back from jail, only for the ball, which Ma has kept safe, to make another prediction. Jeannie celebrates her newfound happiness at a party, singing the title song, only to have it all dashed again when Brooks, who misinterpreted the ball's prediction as referring to a business deal, tells her they're broke; he's even sold the Wonder Wheel on her. Meanwhile, Stan catches Addie cheating on him and leaves her. As Addie is telling Garside about her failed marriage, Brooks shows up to get revenge for the bad business advice, and the two meet and fall in lust. As the newly poor Stan and Jeannie try to make a living on the boardwalk, they wind up chased by Officer Millhauser until he finally handcuffs them together, much to the delight of Garside, as the right couple has finally found each other, once he points out to them who's on "the other half" of their cuffs.

== Background ==
I Had a Ball was similar to earlier projects designed to showcase the talents of a comic, short on plot and overloaded with vaudeville-like comedy routines and musical numbers. In this case the star was nightclub and television comic Buddy Hackett, appearing for the first time in a structured theatrical production. Steven Suskin called this the "clown show"; "They were about the fellow — almost always a man — at the center. Ed Wynn or Bert Lahr or Victor Moore or the brothers Marx..."

== Production ==
The production had a critically and commercially successful run in Detroit. After an additional stop in Philadelphia, the musical opened on Broadway at the Martin Beck Theatre on December 15, 1964 where it ran for 199 performances.

Choreography was by Onna White. Lloyd Richards, who later was the Artistic Director for the Yale Repertory Theatre and a frequent collaborator with playwright August Wilson, was signed to direct. Following a clash with producer Joseph Kipness he was replaced by John Allen, although Richards retained official credit in the program. Prior to opening, several songs had to be cut; Hackett's lack of singing ability led to Garside's solo "Lament/I'm An Average Guy" being removed, as well as Hackett's duet with Kiley entitled "Be A Phony." "I'm An All American Boy", a song that Kiley enjoyed and had requested for himself (but which had been written for a different character), was poorly received in Detroit and was removed.

In addition to Hackett as Garside, the cast included Richard Kiley as Stan, Karen Morrow as Jeannie, Steve Roland as Brooks, Luba Lisa as Addie, Rosetta LeNoire as Ma Maloney, and Ted Thurston as Officer Millhauser. The Alley Gang was made up of Al Nesor as Gimlet, Jack Wakefield as Joe the Muzzler, and Conrad Yama as George Osaka. Morocco, a belly dancer was credited as herself.

== Reception ==
The New York City critics were less enamored with the show than their Detroit counterparts had been, and without a strong directorial hand to keep him under control, Hackett soon began ignoring the script and breaking character to inject his own routines into the proceedings, especially to defend the show from reviews. Despite mixed reviews, positive word-of-mouth, linked with one-night cameos made by several of Hackett's friends (such as Sammy Davis Jr., Joey Bishop, and Steve Lawrence) during a tunnel of love sequence, caused an increase in the box office. However, competition from heavy-hitters like Fiddler on the Roof; Hello, Dolly! and Funny Girl, plus Hackett demanding to be released from his contract without a replacement ready, ultimately led to an early closing with losses of $225,000 from a $300,000 investment.

Luba Lisa was nominated for the Tony Award for Best Featured Actress in a Musical and received the 1965 Theatre World Award for her performance.

== Recordings ==
The original Broadway Cast Recording was released on the Mercury label in 1965. A reviewer of the recording wrote: "There are a couple of mildly witty numbers, 'Neighborhood,' sung by Rosetta Le Noire, and 'The Affluent Society,' by Kiley and Steve Roland, and the romantic ballad 'Almost' isn't bad. But little of the music is memorable, and some of it is derivative."

A compilation, I/We Had a Ball, consisting of jazz versions of songs from the musical was released on Limelight Records in 1964. It features sessions led by Oscar Peterson, Chet Baker, Milt Jackson, Quincy Jones, Art Blakey and Dizzy Gillespie.

== Songs ==
Source: guidetomusicaltheatre.com

Act I

- Coney Island, U.S.A.
- The Other Half of Me
- Red-Blooded American Boy
- I Got Everything I Want
- Freud
- Think Beautiful
- Addie's at It Again
- Faith
- Can It Be Possible?

Act II

- The Neighborhood Song
- The Affluent Society
- Boys, Boys, Boys
- Fickle Finger of Fate
- I Had a Ball
- Almost
- You Deserve Me
- You Deserve Me (reprise)
- Tunnel of Love Chase
