= Molly Molloy =

American dancer, choreographer and teacher

- Born: 4 April 1940; Massachusetts, USA
- Died: 15 June 2016 (aged 76); New York, USA
- Education: High School of Performing Arts; Metropolitan Opera Ballet School
- Occupations: Dancer, choreographer

Molly E. Molloy (April 4, 1940 – June 15, 2016) was an American dancer, choreographer and teacher who worked internationally. She was based in Paris, New York and London and was the originator of the Molloy Technique of Jazz Dance, a form of Modern American Jazz which she notably taught to choreographer Arlene Phillips and her troupe Hot Gossip.

== Personal life ==
Molloy was a fourth-generation dancer, but the first woman. Her great-grandfather was a dancer of Irish dancing as well as tap. Her grandfather was part of a dance team who did Irish dancing, tap and clog. Molloy's grandparents and all of their brothers and sisters all played musical instruments, and most of them danced. Her father (one of six children) along with his twin brother was a member of the "Molloy Twins" or "Molloy Boys," and worked in vaudeville and variety theater.

When Molloy was five, the family moved to New York. Against her mother's wishes, her father and uncle took her all over New York to their agents. But at her mother's insistence, Molloy trained in New York at the High School of Performing Arts and Metropolitan Opera Ballet School on full scholarship. She was a protégée of Antony Tudor at eight years old. She went on to study at the High School of Performing Arts and by the age of 14, was dancing professionally.

She married Paul Atkinson, a guitarist with The Zombies.

Molloy died of lung cancer, aged 76.

== Career ==
Molloy choreographed Russell Clark in a London Festival Ballet performance of The Spirit Within at Collegiate Theatre in 1973.

In Paris she choreographed revues at the Paradis Latin from its re-opening in 1977, working with owner/producer Jean Kriegel and director Jean-Marie Riviere. She choreographed cabaret numbers at the Crazy Horse from 1983 until her death.

Molloy worked on the sets of Agatha (1979) and Tati Danielle (1990). She was involved in choreography for the French cult classic film, La Cité de la peur, (1994). She masterminded the scene in which the protagonists played by Gérard Darmon and Alain Chabat dance La Carioca.

At the invitation of Trevor Nunn, she moved to London from Paris in 1986 to choreograph Chess at the Prince Edward Theatre, London. In 1988, together with songwriter Lionel Bart she pulled out of a production of a musical about Winston Churchill. In the same year she choreographed a Channel 4 TV special My mama done told me, starring Lynn Seymour.

In Paris she choreographed Alain Marcel's production of Peter Pan in 1992, also Yvonne Constant's shows La Difference and One of a Kind from 1997 onwards.

In 2005, she choreographed the world tour of Michael Flatley's Celtic Tiger Live. Between 2005 and 2008, Molloy was the choreographer of Paradis d'amour at Le Paradis Latin. She became the choreographer for L'Ange Bleu.

She worked with Giffords Circus as the English tour dance director on "Caravan" in 2008 and "Yasmine" in 2010 and from 2012, she worked with Andy Black to choreograph Follow The Faun at London's Above the Arts Theatre.

Molloy was UK choreographer for Kylie Minogue's ITV special and a French TV special, Sheila. She worked for Johnny Hallyday as the European tour choreographer on his Heart and Fist tour. Molloy choreographed the summer concert in Holmenkollen Oslo Philharmonic.

=== Teaching ===
Molloy taught at the Royal Ballet School, London and the Paris Opera Ballet School where she was professor emeritus, as well as teaching the Oslo Dance Ensemble. She taught jazz in dance schools around the world including Pineapple Dance Studios, London, London Studio Centre, Italia Conti Academy of Theatre Arts, Broadway Dance Center, New York, Steps on Broadway in New York as a guest Teacher, DanceWorks, Jazz Fests in Costa Rica as a guest teacher, the Boston Youth Moves masterclasses, the Salle Pleyel and Paris Centre. Her former students included Nigel Lythgoe and Arlene Phillips who cited Molloy as her "hero" in a 2019 interview.
