= Engelbert Humperdinck =

Engelbert Humperdinck may refer to:

- Engelbert Humperdinck (composer) (1854–1921), German composer
- Engelbert Humperdinck (singer) (born 1936), British pop singer
  - Engelbert Humperdinck (album), an album by the singer, 1969

== See also ==
- Humperdinck, a name
