= Frank D'Rone =

American jazz guitarist (1932–2013)

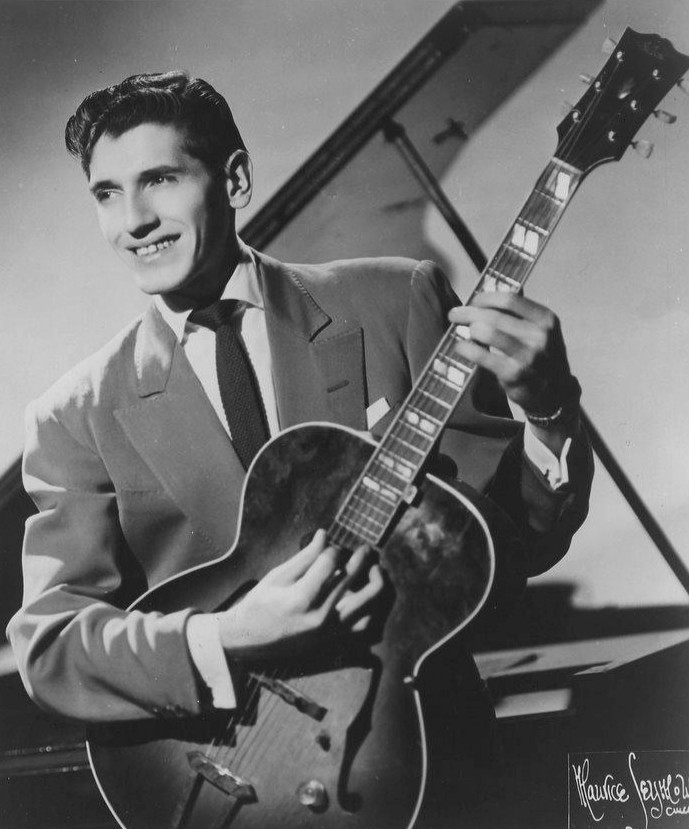
- Frank D'Rone in 1959

Background information
- Born: Frank Caldarone; April 26, 1932; Brockton, Massachusetts, U.S.
- Died: October 3, 2013 (aged 81) Wheaton, Illinois, U.S.
- Genres: Jazz
- Occupations: Singer, guitarist

Frank D'Rone (April 26, 1932 – October 3, 2013) was an American jazz singer and guitarist.

== Biography ==
D'Rone's first album, Frank D'Rone Sings, was released in 1959, and included liner notes penned by Nat "King" Cole, who later helped D'Rone earn several appearances on The Tonight Show Starring Johnny Carson in the 1960s and 1970s. An album with arrangements by Billy May, After the Ball, was released in 1960. D'Rone was a performer at the hungry i nightclub in San Francisco, California, where he recorded a live 1962 album, In Person. However his recording contract with Mercury ended at this time. He also recorded for Columbia Records and RCA Camden. In late 1959 and early 1960s he made numerous appearances on Hugh Hefner's PLAYBOY'S PENTHOUSE.

He was described by the Chicago Tribune as representing "saloon singing at its most refined. You could put him center stage at Carnegie Hall, and he still would sound perfectly at home; the precision of his intonation, phrasing and coloring affirm as much." His style was praised by jazz critic Will Friedwald as "all singing from the heart and no put-ons." He had one hit in the UK Singles Chart in 1960, with the song "Strawberry Blonde (The Band Rocked On)".

In 2006, D'Rone released a recording made in 1984 at a club in Chicago (Benchley's On Broadway), entitled Falling In Love With Love - Live In Chicago. For the past few years before his illness, D'Rone had been performing at various venues in the Chicago area, including Chambers Restaurant, The Green Mill, at the Chicago Jazz FestivalL and the Jazz Showcase. He also performed benefits for a school in Michigan at which he made a DVD. In 2012, D'Rone released a new CD, Double Exposure (Whaling City Sounds), in which his vocals are self-accompanied on guitar, alternated with big band numbers with charts written by Phil Kelly.

D'Rone died on October 3, 2013, aged 81, in Wheaton, Illinois, from cancer.
