= William Walker (baritone) =

American opera singer

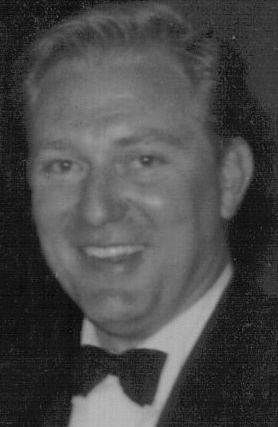
William Walker, 1966

William Sterling Walker (October 29, 1931 – April 10, 2010) was a baritone with the Metropolitan Opera (1962–1980) whose singing career included performances at the White House, at Carnegie Hall and other concert venues across North America and Europe, and some 60 appearances on The Tonight Show Starring Johnny Carson. From 1991-2002, he produced opera as General Director of Fort Worth Opera in Fort Worth, Texas.

== Early life ==
William Walker was born in Waco, Texas and at the age of six moved with his family to Fort Worth, where his father eventually went to work for Consolidated Vultee, a predecessor of General Dynamics. Known as "Bill" to his family and friends, Walker began singing professionally at the age of 12 but secretly yearned to play baseball. After watching him strike out four times one night at a high school game, Walker's father suggested that perhaps his son should think more seriously about being a singer. In 1949, upon graduation from Arlington Heights High School, Walker was awarded a vocal scholarship to Texas Christian University.

His studies were interrupted when he was drafted into the U.S. Army and sent to serve in the Korean War. During his time in Korea, he was awarded the Bronze Star for meritorious service. Upon his honorable discharge, Walker returned to Fort Worth, completed his bachelor's in voice and graduated from Texas Christian University in 1956. In 1957, he married the former Marci Martin and they moved to New York City.

== Singing career ==
In 1960, Walker made his Broadway debut as Tattoo in Wildcat, a musical comedy by N. Richard Nash, Cy Coleman, and Carolyn Leigh, starring Lucille Ball, directed and choreographed by Michael Kidd. He was listed in the program as "Bill Walker". A frequent performer in summer stock during the 1960s, Walker sang in many performances with the St. Louis Municipal Opera, the Kansas City Starlight Theatre, and the Pittsburgh Civic Light Opera in such works as Blossom Time, The Desert Song, Damn Yankees, and Carousel.

In 1962, Walker was a finalist in the Metropolitan Opera National Council Auditions and was offered a contract to join the Metropolitan Opera. His first roles at the Met were small ones, but subsequent exposure on television shows such as The Bell Telephone Hour, The Voice of Firestone, and most notably The Tonight Show Starring Johnny Carson—where Walker appeared some 60 times – led to a higher profile in his opera career. During his 18 seasons there, Walker gave more than 360 performances at the Met and sang the role of Marcello in La bohème more than 30 times.

In 1965, Walker was featured in two new productions at the Met. He was selected to sing the role of Valentin in Faust co-starring Nicolai Gedda, Gabriella Tucci and Cesare Siepi, directed by Jean-Louis Barrault and conducted by Georges Prêtre. He also sang the role of Prince Yeletsky in a new English-language production of Tchaikovsky's The Queen of Spades, conducted by Thomas Schippers. In 1972, Walker repeated the role in the first production of The Queen of Spades ever presented in its original Russian at the Met.

In 1975, when the Met toured Japan for the first time, Walker sang the role of Marcello in La bohème with Franco Corelli and Dorothy Kirsten. The following season, Walker stepped in for an ailing colleague and sang the role of Germont in La traviata for the first time at the Met, a role he had already sung at the Santa Fe Opera and in other regional productions. Critic Harold C. Schonberg wrote in The New York Times, "the best singing of the night came from Mr. Walker", and Time magazine called his Germont "splendidly sung".

Other roles at the Met included Figaro in The Barber of Seville, Papageno in The Magic Flute, Lescaut in Manon Lescaut, Sharpless in Madama Butterfly, Ford in Falstaff, Escamillo in Carmen, the High Priest in Samson et Dalila, Peter in Hansel und Gretel, Schaunard in La bohème, Count Di Luna in Il trovatore, The Herald in Lohengrin, Michele in Il tabarro, Silvio in Pagliacci, Dr. Malatesta in Don Pasquale, and Enrico in Lucia di Lammermoor

Walker's career included performances at the White House: In 1967 during the Johnson administration he was the principal entertainer at the White House Correspondents' Dinner. During the Carter administration, he sang at a White House state dinner honoring Helmut Schmidt, Chancellor of West Germany. In 1976, under the auspices of the U.S. State department, Walker was sent abroad to perform as a representative of the United States. In addition to recitals in Reykjavík, Iceland and at the Royal Swedish Opera in Stockholm, Walker sang Germont in La traviata and Amonasro in Aida in both Warsaw and Łódź, in Poland.

From 1969 to 1976, Walker gave more than 250 solo recitals in the United States and Canada, performing classical operatic arias, art songs and American musical show stoppers, most memorably "Soliloquy" from Carousel and "Surrey With The Fringe On Top" from Oklahoma!. With a technique considered innovative at the time, Walker addressed his recital audiences directly from the stage, interspersing his songs with funny, often self-deprecating stories, making him a more accessible performer to his audiences then the stereotypically aloof classical artist.

Walker was a frequent soloist with many great American orchestras, including the Cleveland Orchestra, the New York Philharmonic, and the Philadelphia Orchestra. In the 1970s, Walker appeared twice at Carnegie Hall as the baritone soloist in performances of Mahler's 8th Symphony with the Chicago Symphony, conducted by Sir Georg Solti.

Walker retired from singing in 1982. In 1970, Walker was named Distinguished Alumnus of the Year by his alma mater, Texas Christian University. In 1980, he was named the Hearndon Distinguished Visiting Professor of Music at Texas Christian University and taught master classes in performance for several years. He also taught master classes as the Carol Kyle Distinguished Visiting Professor of Music at Lamar University in Beaumont, Texas from 1980 to 1984.

== General Director, Fort Worth Opera ==
In 1991, Walker returned to his hometown of Fort Worth to accept the position of General Director of the Fort Worth Opera, a small regional company "with a low budget, low profile and low community confidence".

Even when he was still at the Met and working with world-class stage directors and designers, Walker believed that great singing was what made great opera. "'That's what opera's all about, you know: let the opera singer sing and opera will flourish.'" When he began to produce opera in Fort Worth, Walker capitalized on this philosophy of "a singer's opera" by recognizing the opportunity for Fort Worth Opera to be a showcase for up-and-coming vocal talent.

Focusing mostly on the standard Italian and French repertory, Walker led the company through "seven seasons of rising artistry and record audiences", ultimately increasing season subscriptions, wiping out deficits, and bolstering the company's annual budget and its endowment to what were then record levels. During Walker's tenure, Fort Worth Opera joined other major Fort Worth performing arts organizations (Fort Worth Symphony, Texas Ballet Theater, the Van Cliburn International Piano Competition and Cliburn Concerts series) when they moved into their permanent home at Bass Performance Hall. Tickets for the 1998-1999 inaugural season of Fort Worth Opera at Bass Performance Hall were sold out.

In 1998, despite the successes achieved under Walker's tenure, the executive committee of the larger Fort Worth Opera board of directors attempted to force Walker to retire, but their decision was overridden by a vote of the full board. "I'm the happiest man in America", Walker said at the time. "This is the job I prepared for my whole life. I can't wait to get started again." Walker's contract was extended until 2002, when he retired and was named Executive Director Emeritus by the Fort Worth Opera board of directors.

== Personal life ==
Walker married Marci in 1957. The couple had four children and three grandchildren. One of his sons, popularly known by the pseudonym "Wammo", was a co-founder, songwriter and performer with the Asylum Street Spankers.

== Recordings ==
Commercially available audio and video recordings of Walker are rare.

=== Audio ===
- Cole Porter: A Remembrance RCA/NBC, rare recording from a Today Show broadcast in 1965
- The Naked Carmen Mercury SRM 1-604, 1970
- Wildcat Original Broadway Cast Soundtrack, RCA Victor LOC-1060, 1961

=== Video ===
- The Voice of Firestone: A Firestone French Opera Gala (as Mercutio in Romeo et Juliette, telecast of February 10, 1963) ISBN 1-56195-054-8, New England Conservatory of Music/Video Artists International. Inc.
- The Bell Telephone Hour shows on file at the Paley Center for Media (formerly the Museum of Television and Radio) in New York. New York

Other recordings and career memorabilia are on deposit in the William Walker Collection at the library at Texas Christian University, Fort Worth, Texas.
