= Murray Roman =

American comedian and writer (1929–1973)

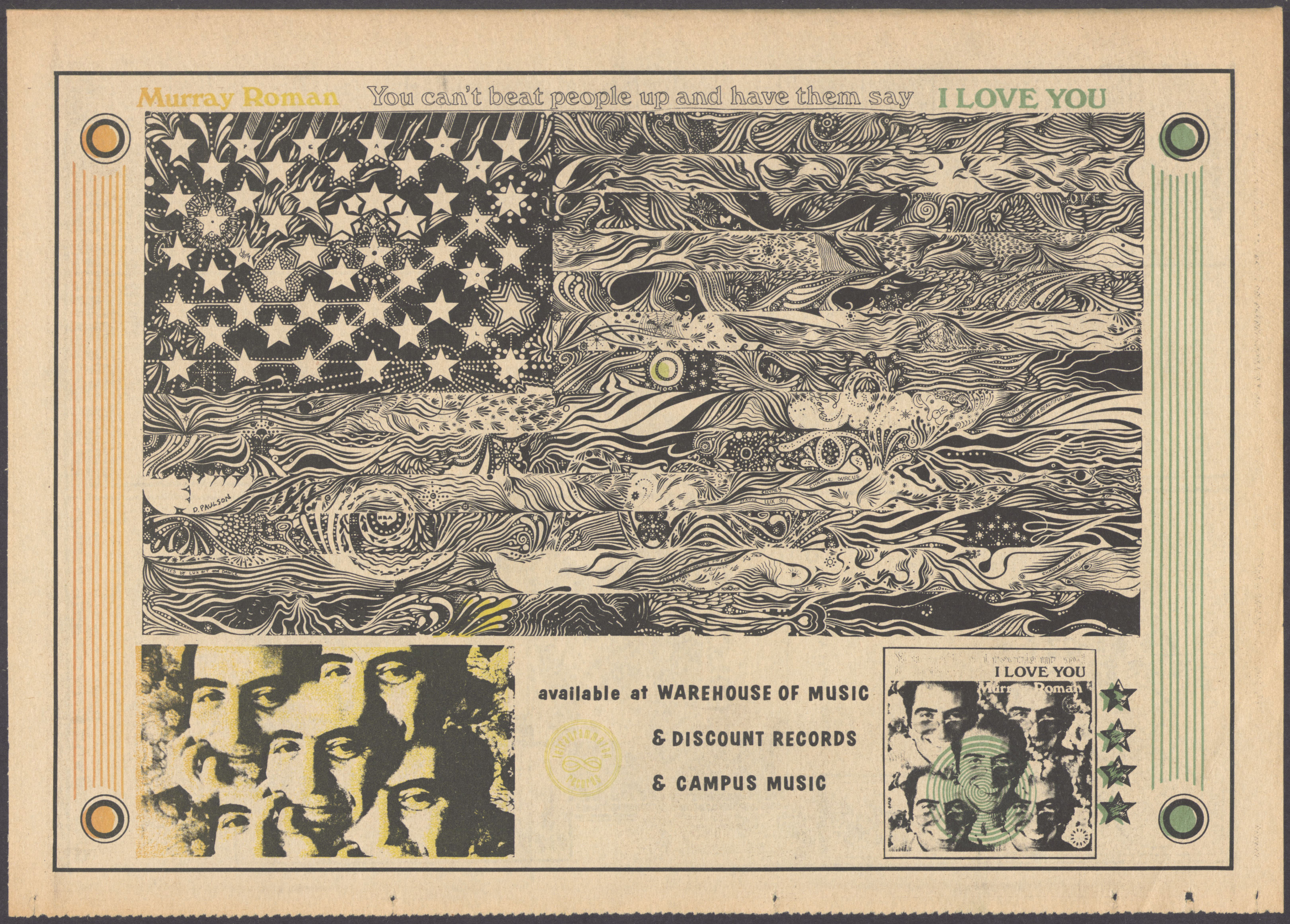
Advertisement for Roman's album You Can't Beat People Up and Have Them Say I Love You

Murray Roman (March 8, 1929 – November 6, 1973) was an American stand-up comedian and television writer whose career was cut short by a car crash.

== Career ==
In addition to his stand-up comedy, Roman was a writer on The Smothers Brothers Comedy Hour television series and, as part of the Comedy Hour writing team, won a Primetime Emmy Award for Outstanding Writing for a Variety Series for his work in 1969. A noted sketch was "The Honey House", which mocked the 1968 hit song "Honey", by Bobby Goldsboro. The sketch featured a tour of the house where the eponymous Honey had lived and died, conducted by her husband, played first by Tom Smothers and then by Dick Smothers.

According to American actor and comedy writer Bob Einstein, English musician Keith Moon was a "huge fan" of Roman. Moon helped Roman obtain a contract with Track Records.

=== Discography ===
- Out of Control
- You Can't Beat People Up and Have Them Say I Love You
- A Blind Man's Movie
- Busted
- Backtrack 13 (You Can't Beat People Up and Have Them Say I Love You)

=== Television appearances ===
- The Rat Patrol, "The Tug-of-War Raid" (March 4, 1968), as Lt. Pohl
- The Monkees, S2:E16, "Fairy Tale" (January 8, 1968), as Harold
- That Girl, "This Little Piggy Had a Ball" (March 23, 1967), as Manager of Bowling Alley
- ABC Stage 67, "On the Flip Side" (December 7, 1966), as Hairy Eddie Popkin
- Batman, "Hizzonner the Penguin (1)" (November 2, 1966) and "Dizzonner the Penguin (2)" (November 3, 1966), as E.G. Trends
- The Smothers Brothers Comedy Hour, wrote and occasionally appeared
- Murray Roman's TV Show, television special (1970), host

=== Influence ===
DJ Shadow sampled Roman's record Busted in "Stem/Long Stem/Transmission 2", a track on his 1996 album Endtroducing. DJ Shadow also sampled Busted on his single "Lost and Found (S.F.L.)".

== Personal life ==
Roman married three times and had three daughters.
