= Yvonne Constant =

French actress, singer and ballet dancer (1930–2023)

- Born: 1930; Paris, France
- Died: 28 February 2023 (aged 92); Larmor-Plage, France
- Occupations: Actress, singer, dancer

Yvonne Constant (1930 – 28 February 2023) was a French actress, singer and ballet dancer.

== Stage productions ==
Yvonne Constant sang in cabaret in New York, other parts of the U.S. and in Europe. Latterly she appeared at the Metropolitan Room in New York 14 times in 2008 and 2009. Her appearances were well received by cabaret critic, William Wolf. Her shows were presented by Jan Wallman, directed and staged by international choreographer Molly Molloy, and her musical director was Russ Kassoff.

In 2007 she sang "Ah Paris" at the City Center revival of Follies.

Constant was cast for the Broadway production, La Plume de Ma Tante and won a special Tony. When she did The Gay Life with Barbara Cook, Yvonne got a New York Drama Critics Citation as one of the season's Most Promising Actresses. Johnny Carson had Yvonne on his show 45 times. Richard Rodgers saw her on The Tonight Show and chose her for a leading role in No Strings. Then she was the French au pair in the Broadway Comedy, Come Live with Me.

== Films ==
Constant was best remembered for her role in Disney's "Monkeys, Go Home!", starring opposite Maurice Chevalier. In the television mini-series "Sins" she played the chanteuse, Annette, alongside Joan Collins.

== Appraisal ==
Yvonne was named Chevalier des Arts et des Lettres by the French Government.

== Death ==
Constant died on 28 February 2023, at the age of 92.
