= January Jones (singer) =

American singer

... underneath January Jones there is a girl named Jacqueline Allison, who grew up in Chicago and whose warm, unpretentious personality emerges as she gets beyond her old Las Vegas material... to contemporary songs like "Singing My Song for You". The more she relaxes into Jackie Allison and the more January Jones disappears into the mists of her past, the better she sounds.

— John S. Wilson, New York Times, 1973

January Jones (the stage name of Jacqueline Allison) is an American pop singer, active mainly in the 1960s and 1970s. She was active in Las Vegas.

Jones appeared at venues including the Persian Room at the Plaza Hotel, the Sahara Hotel, the Eden Roc Hotel, and the Latin Casino.

She appeared on television shows including Girl Talk, The Merv Griffin Show, The Mike Douglas Show, That Regis Philbin Show, and The Tonight Show Starring Johnny Carson (nine appearances). All these appearances were between 1963 and 1967, except for her last two Tonight Show appearances, which were in 1975.

Earl Wilson called her the "Scopitone queen, drawing more quarters on those [video jukebox] machines than anybody else." She often appeared in a bikini in these shorts.

Jones, from Chicago, was a cocktail waitress in Las Vegas before becoming a performer. Her first manager (whom she married two weeks after meeting and later divorced) made her change her name from Jaqueline Allison to January Jones. According to Jones, "He wanted to associate me with the calendar. He said I was like a Vargas girl in Playboy".

She took a hiatus for marriage and children in the late 1960s and early 1970s, returning to the stage in 1973 but retiring later.

== Discography ==
=== Singles ===
- "I Cry Alone" b/w "Try Me" (1964, 20th Century Fox)
- "In This World" b/w "What About Mine" (1964, 20th Century Fox)
- "Poor Someone" b/w "Whenever I Dream of You" (1966, Ascot)

=== Compilation albums ===
- "Try Me" on Boppin' Cadillac: Authentic 60's "Popcorn" Oldies, Vol. 2 (1994, Bar Records (Belgium))
- "What About Mine" on Rare Teen Oldies Vol. 4 (2013, Rare Rockin Records/Customtone)
- "In This World" on Heartbreaking Teenage Rock (2019, Spotify and other streaming services)

== Filmography ==
=== Films ===
- Don't Worry, We'll Think of a Title (1966) – Magda Anders
- Quick, Before It Melts (1964) – Redhead (uncredited)
- Looking for Love (1964) – Miss MacDeal (uncredited)

=== Television ===
- 77 Sunset Strip (1 episode, 1964)

=== Scopitones ===
- "I've Got The World On A String" (S-1014)
- "That Old Gang of Mine" (S-1015)
- "Lazy River" (S-1058)
- "I Love Being Here With You" (S-1059)
