= Luba Lisa =

American actress

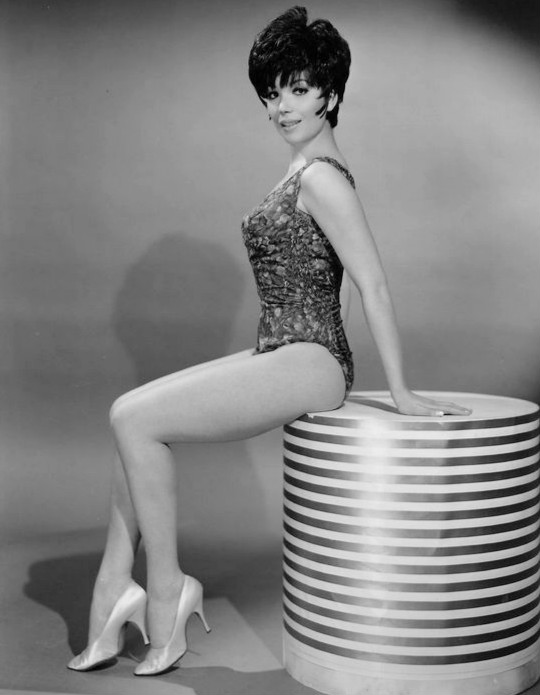
- Born: Luba Lisa Gootnick; March 10, 1941; New York City, U.S.
- Died: December 15, 1972 (aged 31); Colchester, Vermont, U.S.
- Occupations: Actor; Singer; Television presenter
- Years active: 1960–1966

Luba Lisa Gootnick (March 10, 1941 – December 15, 1972) was an American actress, singer, and television presenter. She received a Tony Award nomination and won a Theatre World Award for her performance in the 1964 musical I Had a Ball.

== Personal life ==
Gootnick was born in Brooklyn, New York, the daughter of Jewish parents Esther (née Diamant 1908–1999) and Louis Gootnick (1910–2005), a former New York City police officer.

== Theatre ==
Her Broadway credits include Carnival as Princess Olga in 1961, and I Can Get It for You Wholesale in 1962 with a cast that included Barbra Streisand. In 1964 she starred in a Broadway revival of West Side Story as Anita. The show closed after 31 performances. Luba received rave reviews for her role as the floozy Addie in the musical I Had a Ball in which she sang the song called 'Addie's at it Again'. The song was added to the show by the producers before the show opened on Broadway, once they realized her talent.

A New York Times Critic said of her, "Luba Lisa, as Addie, the girl of easy virtue, gets to demonstrate her talents as a seductive babe and a lively dancer in a number called 'Addie's at It Again' and in another with a group of lifeguards called 'Boys, Boys, Boys'". For her role as Addie she was nominated for a Tony Award for Best Featured Actress in a Musical and received a Theatre World Award. Luba danced with Maurice Chevalier in the film Pepe. She was also a television personality.

In 1972 Lisa starred in the Off-Broadway musical revue They Don't Make Em Like That Anymore at the Plaza 9 Music Hall with Arthur Blake. The show was built around Blake's impersonations of celebrities like Marlene Dietrich and Jimmy Stewart.

== Death ==
Luba Lisa died on December 15, 1972, in a plane crash near Colchester, Vermont. The plane was on its way to an airport in Burlington, Vermont. Winter weather hazards during night travel were thought to have caused the crash. All four on board (the pilot, Lisa, and two others) perished. She is interred with her parents at Mount Ararat Jewish Cemetery in Farmingdale, New York.
