= Charlie Manna =

American comedian

Charlie Manna (October 6, 1920 – November 9, 1971) was an Italian American standup comedian, active in the 1960s. He was a New York resident, who stated that he came from the Bronx, and who had studied opera for five years before turning to comedy. He first appeared at the Green Mansions resort, in the Adirondacks near the Catskills resort area. He appeared on many theatrical and television variety shows of the era, including Sunday Night at the London Palladium, The Ed Sullivan Show, The Tonight Show, The Steve Allen Show, Jackie Gleason's Stage Show, the Jack Paar Show, Perry Como's Kraft Music Hall, The Merv Griffin Show and The Garry Moore Show. He performed at local venues like the Radio City Music Hall, the Bon Soir supper club, the Blue Angel, the Copacabana and Montreal's El Morocco. He appeared in theatrical performances, including Michael Stewart's Shoestring '57 and Hermione Gingold's Sticks and Stones.

He was well known for conceptual humor, based on incongruity, such as the routine in which an astronaut balks at being launched until someone finds his box of crayons, containing "a green, an orange and two blacks"; as well as using his musical training in a routine, such as Alcatraz - the Musical, and La Bonanza, a parody of an opera based on a popular TV Western, which he performed on The Johnny Cash Show.

Veteran comedian Phyllis Diller credited Manna with helping improve her standup routine when she was starting in the business, "It was at New York's Bon Soir nightclub during the early sixties that the comic Charlie Manna gave me the greatest advice about how to get on: quickly tell five of your hottest jokes and then run with them. Get the audience laughing for real, don't make it a phony deal." Manna was quoted as saying, "There are two varieties of comedy: funny and not funny."

He recorded two comedy albums in performance at clubs. The first was Manna Live!!; the second was Manna Overboard!!, (Decca Records, 1961), produced by Michael Ross, written by Ross and Bruce Howard, recorded at the Village Vanguard, New York.

He died in 1971 from cancer at age 51.
