= Corbett Monica =

American comedian

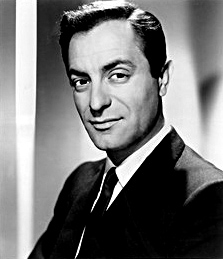
- Photo taken 1967
- Born: Matthew Corbett Monica; June 1, 1930; New York City, U.S.
- Died: July 22, 1998 (aged 68); North Miami, Florida, U.S.
- Occupation: Comedian
- Known for: Stand-up comedy, film and television actor
- Spouses: First wife (m. 19??; div. 19??); Helen Stover (m. 1954; div. 1974)
- Partner: Barbara Ortwein (19??-1998, his death)
- Children: 6

Matthew Corbett Monica (June 1, 1930 – July 22, 1998) was an American comedian who appeared 18 times on The Ed Sullivan Show. He also was a frequent guest host of The Tonight Show with Johnny Carson, and was one of 'The Comics' at the Carnegie Deli in Woody Allen's 1984 film Broadway Danny Rose.

== Career ==
One of the more successful Borscht Belt comedians, Monica resided in New York City and New Jersey in the 1950s, and worked his way up from suburban clubs to the Copacabana and the Latin Quarter prior to his first television appearances.

Monica appeared with Frank Sinatra so often that he became a junior member of the Rat Pack, and later became Joey Bishop's sidekick, from 1963 to 1965, as Larry Corbett, Mr. Bishop's friend and writer on The Joey Bishop Show.

In the 1970s and 80s he appeared mostly in night clubs and showrooms across the country, including Las Vegas. He opened for headliners like Paul Anka, Nat King Cole, Sammy Davis Jr., Lena Horne, Dean Martin, Liza Minnelli, Sandler & Young and Jerry Vale. As his career wound down he was noted for touring for many years with Steve Lawrence and Eydie Gormé.

== Personal life ==
Monica was married, had a son and divorced by the time he joined the US Army in the early 1950s. While stationed in Washington State, he met Helen Stover, of Seattle. They married in 1954, after he finished his stint in the army, and the family eventually settled in Englewood, New Jersey – close to his work in the nightclubs and television studios of New York City. The couple had five children together, two sons and three daughters, before they divorced in 1974.

Monica died of cancer on July 22, 1998, survived by his six children and his longtime partner, Barbara Ortwein.

== Partial filmography ==
- The Grasshopper (1970) - Danny Raymond
- Broadway Danny Rose (1984) - himself (final film role)
