= Alan King =

American comedian and actor (1927–2004)

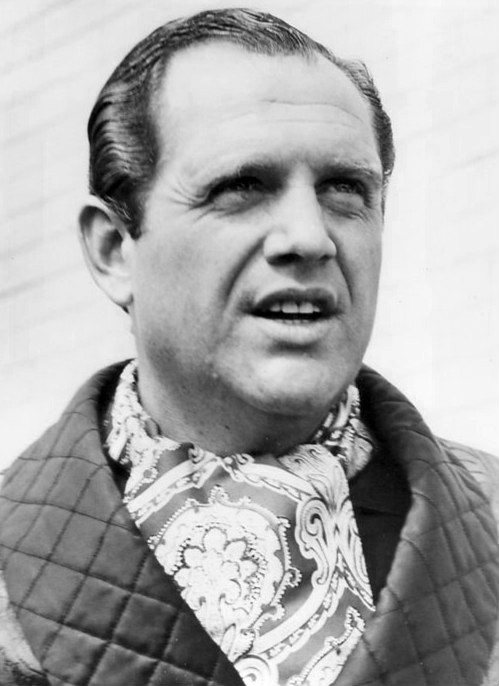
- King in 1966
- Born: Irwin Alan Kniberg; December 26, 1927; New York City, United States
- Died: May 9, 2004 (aged 76); New York City, United States
- Occupations: Comedian; actor; satirist; producer; screenwriter
- Years active: 1942–2004
- Spouse: Jeanette Sprung (m. 1947)
- Children: 3

Alan King (born Irwin Alan Kniberg; December 26, 1927 – May 9, 2004) was an American comedian, actor and satirist known for his biting wit and often angry humorous rants. He was also a serious actor who appeared in a number of films and television shows. King wrote several books, produced films, and appeared in plays. In his later years, he helped many philanthropic causes.

== Early life ==
King was born in New York City, the son of Russian Jewish immigrants Minnie (née Solomon) and Bernard Kniberg, a handbag cutter. He had one older sister, Anita Kniberg. He spent his first years on the Lower East Side of Manhattan. Later, King's family moved to Brooklyn. King used humor to survive the tough neighborhoods, and performed impersonations on street corners for pennies.

When he was 14, King performed "Brother, Can You Spare a Dime?" on the radio program Major Bowes Amateur Hour. He lost first prize, but was invited to join a nationwide tour. At 15, King dropped out of high school to perform comedy at the Hotel Gradus in the Catskill Mountains. After one joke that made fun of the hotel's owner, he was fired, but he spent the remainder of that summer and the one that followed as emcee at Forman's New Prospect Hotel in Mountaindale, New York. He later worked in Canada in a burlesque house while also fighting as a professional boxer; he won 20 straight bouts . Nursing a broken nose, King decided to quit boxing and focus on comedy. He worked as a doorman at the popular nightclub Leon and Eddie's, while performing comedy under the last name of the boxer who beat him, King.

== Career ==
King began his comedy career with one-liner routines and other material concerning mothers-in-law and Jews. His style of comedy changed when he saw Danny Thomas in the early 1950s. King realized that Thomas was speaking to his audience, not at them, and was getting a better response. King changed his own style from one-liners to a more conversational style that used everyday life for humor.

His wife had persuaded the New Yorker to forsake Manhattan for suburban Forest Hills, Queens. In the 1950s, his family and he lived in Rockville Centre, New York, and later in Kings Point, Long Island, where he lived for the rest of his life. There, he developed comedy revolving around life in suburbia. With many Americans moving to the suburbs, King's humor took hold. Like many other Jewish comics, King worked the Catskill circuit known as the Borscht Belt.

He was soon opening for Judy Garland, Patti Page, Nat King Cole, Billy Eckstine, Lena Horne, and Tony Martin. When Martin was cast in the movie Hit the Deck, he got King his first movie role. He played small roles in movies in the 1950s, but disliked stereotypical roles that he described as "always the sergeant from Brooklyn named Kowalski." Typical of this was his role as Sgt Buzzer in the WW2 film On the Fiddle (1961).

His career took off after appearances on The Ed Sullivan Show, The Perry Como Show, and The Garry Moore Show.

He performed at President John F. Kennedy's inaugural ball in 1961.

Living just outside New York City, King was frequently available when Ed Sullivan needed a short-notice fill-in. He became a regular guest host for The Tonight Show Starring Johnny Carson.

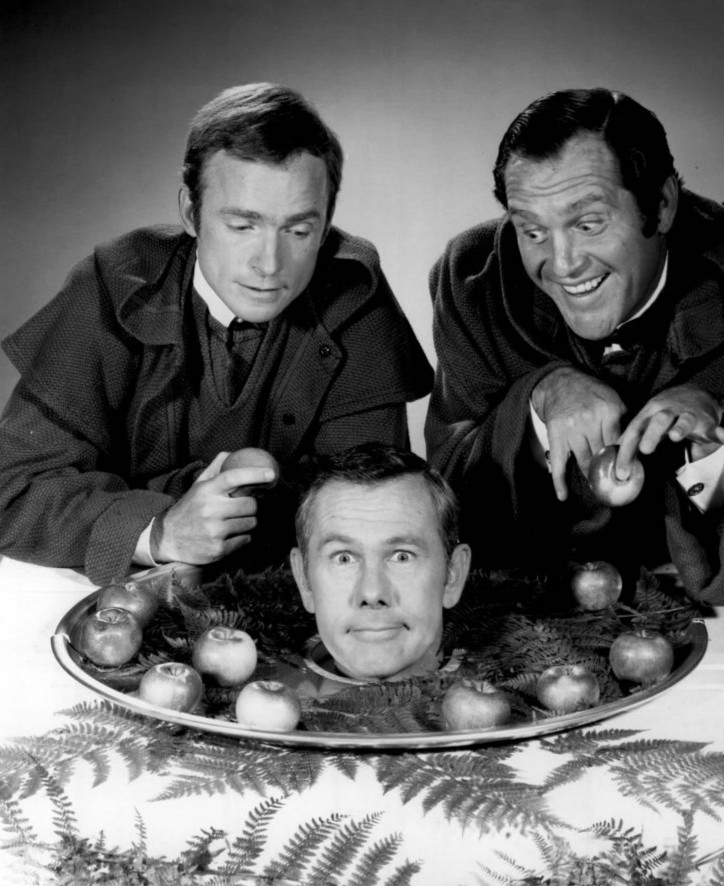
With Dick Cavett and Johnny Carson in 1968

He hosted the Oscars in 1972.

He headlined two unsold television pilots on CBS, both titled The Alan King Show. The first aired on September 8, 1961; the second aired on July 12, 1986.

King eventually expanded his range and made a name for himself in a wide variety of films. He frequently worked for director Sidney Lumet, beginning with Bye Bye Braverman (1968) and The Anderson Tapes (1971). Lumet later cast him in a starring role in Just Tell Me What You Want (1980), a provocative comedy about a ruthless business mogul and his TV-producer mistress (Ali MacGraw). He also played in an uncredited cameo in Lumet's Prince of the City (1981).

He often portrayed gangsters, as in I, the Jury (1982) and Cat's Eye (1985). He had another major role in Memories of Me (1988) as the so-called "king of the Hollywood extras", portraying Billy Crystal's terminally ill father. King played the role of corrupt union official Andy Stone in Martin Scorsese's 1995 film Casino. He appeared in Night and the City (1992), also starring Robert De Niro.

King was the long-standing host of the New York Friars Club celebrity roasts and served as the club's historian.

King was the first recipient (1988) of the award for American Jewish humor from the National Foundation for Jewish Culture. The award was ultimately named in his honor. He inspired other comedians, including Joan Rivers, Jerry Seinfeld, Larry David, Billy Crystal, Robert Klein, and Bill Cosby.

== Personal life ==
King married Jeanette Sprung in 1947. They had three children: Andrew, Robert, and Elainie Ray. His wife persuaded him to move to Forest Hills, Queens, for their children's sake. In the 1950s, his family and he lived in Rockville Centre, New York, and later in Kings Point, Long Island, where he lived for the rest of his life.

Throughout his life, King was deeply involved in charity work. He founded the Alan King Medical Center in Jerusalem, raised funds for the Nassau Center for Emotionally Disturbed Children (near his home in Kings Point, New York), and established a chair in dramatic arts at Brandeis University. He also created the Laugh Well program, which sends comedians to hospitals to perform for patients. In the 1970s, King turned his passion for tennis into a professional tournament at Caesars Palace Las Vegas called the Alan King Tennis Classic, which was aired nationally on the TVS Television Network. He also created the Toyota Comedy Festival.

=== Death ===
King, who smoked cigars heavily (a fact that came up in his routines from time to time), died at Memorial Sloan-Kettering Cancer Center in Manhattan on May 9, 2004, from lung cancer. His funeral service was held at Riverside Memorial Chapel. He was subsequently buried in Mount Hebron Cemetery in Flushing, Queens. The film Christmas with the Kranks was dedicated to his memory. He is also recognized in the end credits of Rush Hour 3.

== Work ==
=== Film ===
- 1955 Hit the Deck as Shore Patrol (debut film role)
- 1956 Miracle in the Rain as Sergeant Gilbert 'Gil' Parker
- 1956 The Girl He Left Behind as Maguire
- 1957 The Helen Morgan Story as Benny Weaver
- 1961 On the Fiddle as T/Sgt Buzzer
- 1968 Bye Bye Braverman as The Rabbi
- 1971 The Anderson Tapes as Angelo
- 1977 Seventh Avenue (TV miniseries) as Harry Lee
- 1978 How to Pick Up Girls! as Manny Shiller
- 1980 Just Tell Me What You Want as Max Herschel
- 1981 Prince of the City as himself (cameo, uncredited)
- 1982 I, the Jury as Charles Kalecki
- 1982 Author! Author! as Kreplich
- 1983 Lovesick as Dr. Lionel Gross, M.D.
- 1985 Cat's Eye as Dr. Vinny Donatti
- 1987 You Talkin' to Me? as himself
- 1988 Memories of Me as Abe
- 1989 Funny (documentary)
- 1989 Enemies, A Love Story as Rabbi Lembeck
- 1990 The Bonfire of the Vanities as Arthur Ruskin
- 1991 Dragon and Slippers as narrator (voice)
- 1992 Night and the City as Ira 'Boom Boom' Grossman
- 1995 Casino as Andy Stone
- 1998 The Brave Little Toaster Goes to Mars as Supreme Commander (voice)
- 2001 Rush Hour 2 as Steven Reign
- 2002 Sunshine State as Murray Silver
- 2004 Mind the Gap as Herb Schweitzer (final film role)

=== Television ===
- 1974–1984 The Dean Martin Celebrity Roast as himself
- 1980 Pinocchio's Christmas as Maestro Fire-Eater (voice)
- 1990 Thirtysomething episode "Prelude to a Bris" as Dr. Ben Teitelman
- 1990 Alan King: Inside the Comedy Mind Host and (producer)
- 1990 Great Performances - The World of Jewish Humor
- 1991 The Golden Girls (1991); episode "Melodrama" (guest), as Mel Bushman, Blanche's On-Off Beau
- 1992 Blossom episode "Losing Your … Religion", as Rabbi Hyman Greenblatt
- 1993 Law & Order episode "Securitate" (guest) as Jonathan Shapiro
- 1994 Roseanne episode "Nine Is Enough" (guest), as Sid
- 1995 The State (TV Series) The State's 43rd Annual All-Star Halloween Special as himself
- 1998 Murphy Brown episode "Now You Can Say Goodbye" (guest) as God
- 1999 Chicago Hope episode "Big Hand for the Little Lady" (guest) as Larry Lensky
- 1999 Family Law episode "The Nanny" (guest) as Hy Adlin
- 2000 Family Guy episode "There's Something About Paulie" as The Don (voice)

=== Stage ===
- Guys and Dolls (actor, Nathan Detroit), 15 performances
- The Impossible Years (actor)
- The Lion in Winter (producer)
- Something Different (producer)
- Mr. Goldwyn (actor)
- Festival (writer)

== Bibliography ==
- Anybody Who Owns His Own Home Deserves It, with Kathryn Ryan (1962)
- Help! I'm a Prisoner in a Chinese Bakery (1964)
- Is Salami and Eggs Better Than Sex? Memoirs of a Happy Eater (1985)
- Name Dropping: The Life and Lies of Alan King (1996) with Chris Chase
- Alan King's Great Jewish Joke Book (2002)
- Matzoh Balls for Breakfast and Other Memories of Growing Up Jewish (2005)
