= Joan Banks =

American actress (1918–1998)

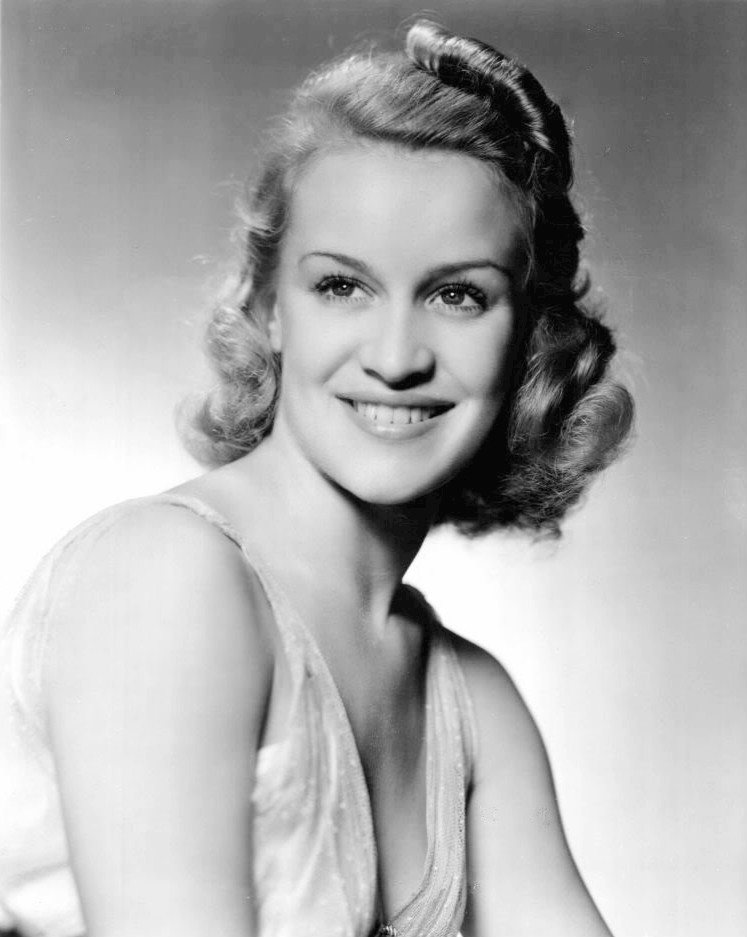
- Joan Banks in 1939
- Born: October 30, 1918; Petersburg, West Virginia, U.S.
- Died: January 18, 1998 (aged 79); Los Angeles, California, U.S.
- Occupation: Actress
- Years active: 1950–1967
- Spouse: Frank Lovejoy (m. 1940; died 1962)
- Children: 2

Joan Banks (October 30, 1918 – January 18, 1998) was an American film, television, stage, and radio actress (described as "a soapbox queen"), who often appeared in dramas with her husband, Frank Lovejoy.

== Early life ==
Banks attended a school of Russian ballet as a little girl and excelled as a swimmer during high school. Her talent earned her a scholarship to the American Academy of Dramatic Art, and she attended Hunter College.

== Career ==
=== Radio ===
Banks first appeared on radio with Walter O'Keefe in 1936, when she was 18. At that same age, she became the first "feminine stooge" for Stoopnagle and Budd on their show. Her other roles on radio programs include:

Program	Role
Bringing Up Father	Nora
Buck Private and His Girl	"snooty" deb
Gangbusters	various
Her Honor, Nancy James	secretary
John's Other Wife	Roberta Lansing
My Friend Irma	Jane Stacy
The Home of the Brave	N/A
Nightbeat	various
The O'Neills	Peggy O'Neill Kayden
This Day Is Ours	Eleanor MacDonald
Valiant Lady	Joan Hargrave-Scott
Young Widder Brown	Camilla

=== Film ===
Banks began her Hollywood career with small roles in such films as Cry Danger (1951) and Washington Story (1952). She became better known in the 1950s and early 1960s for her many appearances as a supporting actress in films such as My Pal Gus. In 1961, Banks appeared in the movie Return to Peyton Place.

=== Television ===
On March 25, 1958, Banks co-starred with husband Lovejoy in an episode of his Meet McGraw program.

She made five appearances on Perry Mason, including four roles as the murderer: in 1957, she played Karen Alder in "The Case of the Negligent Nymph"; in 1958, she played Valerie Brewster in "The Case of the Fancy Figures"; in 1960, she played Mrs. Joseph Manley in "The Case of the Mythical Monkeys"; in 1961, she played Rhonda Houseman in "The Case of the Left-Handed Liar"; and in 1964, she played Nellie Conway in "The Case of the Woeful Widower". In 1958, she appeared as Clara Hood in the episode, "Fatal Memory," on the TV series Wanted: Dead or Alive. She also made four appearances on National Velvet, two appearances on Alfred Hitchcock Presents, and single appearances on shows such as Ford Theatre, I Love Lucy, Private Secretary, Date with the Angels, The Rough Riders, Mr. Adams and Eve, The Many Loves of Dobie Gillis, Bewitched, and again two appearances on Hazel.

On October 2, 1962, Frank Lovejoy died of a heart attack in bed in his sleep at the Warwick Hotel in New York City. At the time, Banks and he had just finished appearing together in a run of a New Jersey stage production of Gore Vidal's play The Best Man. Banks' career in radio continued after her work in television subsided, and she appeared in 33 episodes of CBS Radio Mystery Theater from 1974 to 1980.

== Personal life and death ==
Banks married fellow actor Frank Lovejoy, whom she met when both had roles on the radio soap opera This Day Is Ours. The couple had two children, Judy and Steve. She died of lung cancer on January 18, 1998.

== Filmography ==
Year	Title	Role	Notes
1950	Stars Over Hollywood		Season 1 Episode 5: "Some Small Nobility"
1951	Cry Danger	Alice Fletcher	
1951	Bright Victory	Janet Grayson	
1952	Rebound		Season 1 Episode 7: "Joker's Wild"
1952	Washington Story	Mrs. Vatek	
1952	My Pal Gus	Ivy Tolliver	
1953–1954	Four Star Playhouse	Laughing Woman (uncredited) / Madeline / Celeste	3 episodes
1953–1955	Private Secretary	Sylvia Platt	13 episodes (Recurring role)
1954	I Love Lucy	Eleanor Harris	Season 3 Episode 17: "Fan Magazine Interview"
1954	Robert Montgomery Presents		Season 6 Episode 3: "Two Wise Women"
1954–1955	The George Burns and Gracie Allen Show	Alice Rogers / Miss Gardner	2 episodes
1955	The Star and the Story	Estelle	Season 1 Episode 5: "Safe Journey"
1955	Make Room for Daddy		Season 2 Episode 21: "Danny Tries Real Estate"
1955	Stage 7	Letty Bowman / Fran	2 episodes
1956	Star Stage		Season 1 Episode 21: "Screen Credit"
1956	It's a Great Life	Salesgirl	Season 2 Episode 27: "All for Amy"
1956	December Bride	Mary Lou Bigelow	Season 2 Episode 31: "Swimming Pool"
1956	The Ford Television Theatre	Hilda Pomeroy	Season 4 Episode 39: "A Part Remembered"
1956	The Charles Farrell Show	Karen Grant	Season 1 Episode 3: "Fatal Charm"
1956–1957	Alfred Hitchcock Presents	Margaret / Lee	2 episodes
1957	Schlitz Playhouse of Stars		Season 6 Episode 19: "One Left Over"
1957	Mister Cory	Lily	
1957	The Millionaire	Ruth Ferris	Season 4 Episode 7: "The Ruth Ferris Story"
1957	Goodyear Theatre	Cynthia Roland	Season 1 Episode 4: "Voices in the Fog"
1957	Code 3	Bonnie Benson	Season 1 Episode 39: "The Benson Case"
1957–1958	Meet McGraw	Laura / Doris Stark	2 episodes
1957–1964	Perry Mason	Karen Alder / Valerie Brewster / Mrs. Manley / Rhonda Houseman / Nellie Conway	5 episodes
1958	Date with the Angels	Dottie	Season 2 Episode 18: "The Train"
1958	Mr. Adams and Eve	Lovey	Season 2 Episode 29: "The Lovey Doveys"
1958	Mike Hammer	Sandra Ryan	Season 1 Episode 19: "Music to Die By"
1958	State Trooper	Edna Linkman	Season 2 Episode 31: "Hardrock Man"
1958	Wanted: Dead or Alive	Clara Hood	Season 1 Episode 2: "Fatal Memory"
1958	Zane Grey Theatre	Melanie Fleming	Season 3 Episode 5: "Legacy of a Legend"
1959	Colonel Humphrey Flack	Deborah	Season 2 Episode 29: "Colonel Flack's New Muffler"
1959	The David Niven Show	Nora	Season 1 Episode 5: "The Twist of the Key"
1959	The Rough Riders	Norah Eddiman	Season 1 Episode 35: "The Wagon Raiders"
1959	Philip Marlowe		Season 1 Episode 4: "Death in the Family"
1960	Richard Diamond, Private Detective	Lee Swinnerton	Season 3 Episode 34: "The Fine Art of Murder"
1960	Hawaiian Eye	Aunt 'Birdie' Birdwell	Season 1 Episode 17: "Then There Were Three"
1960	The DuPont Show with June Allyson	June	Season 1 Episode 28: "Surprise Party"
1960	The Many Loves of Dobie Gillis	Mrs. Edna Gilroy	Season 1 Episode 37: "Here Comes the Groom"
1960	Let's Make Love	Secretary	Uncredited
1961	Return to Peyton Place	Mrs. Humphries	Uncredited
1961–1962	Hazel	Francesca Kettering / Jane Edwards	2 episodes
1961–1962	National Velvet	Mrs. Helen Hadley	4 episodes
1967	Bewitched	Margaret Baxter	Season 4 Episode 7: "Birdies, Bogies and Baxter"
