= Annexing Bill =

1918 film

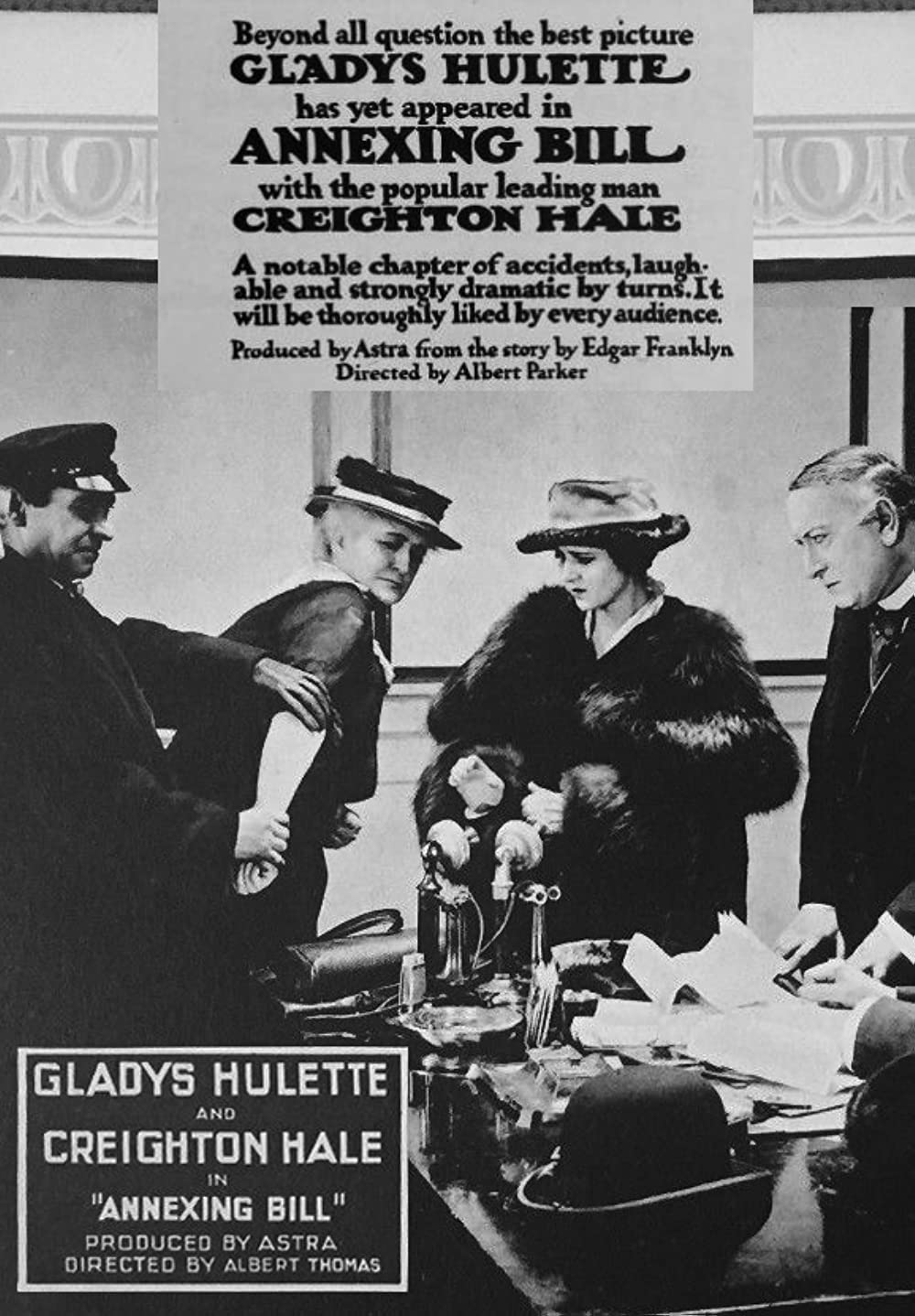
- Directed by: Albert Parker
- Written by: Tom Cushing; Edgar Franklin
- Starring: Gladys Hulette; Creighton Hale; Kate Lester
- Production company: Astra Film
- Distributed by: Pathé Exchange
- Release date: July 7, 1918
- Running time: 50 minutes
- Country: United States
- Language: Silent

Annexing Bill is a 1918 American silent romantic comedy film directed by Albert Parker and starring Gladys Hulette, Creighton Hale and Kate Lester.

== Cast ==
- Gladys Hulette as Enid Barwell
- Creighton Hale as Billy
- Mark Smith as George Frayne
- Margaret Greene as Mrs. Frayne
- Kate Lester as Enid's Aunt - Imposter

== Preservation ==
With no holding located in archives, Annexing Bill is considered a lost film.

== Bibliography ==
- Connelly, Robert B. The Silents: Silent Feature Films, 1910-36, Volume 40, Issue 2. December Press, 1998.
