= Walter O'Keefe =

American actor

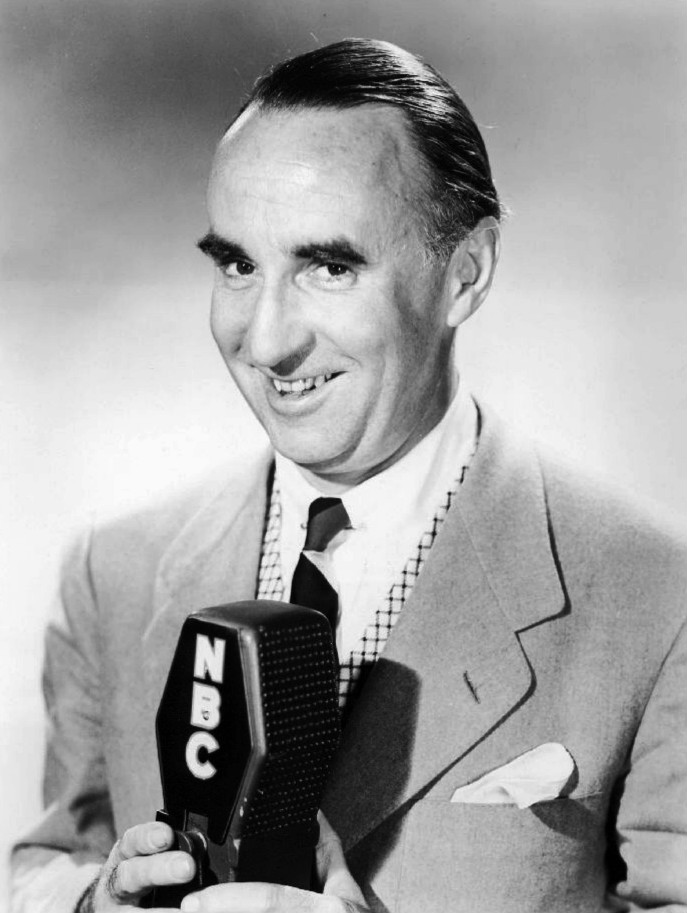
Walter O'Keefe

Walter O'Keefe (August 18, 1900 – June 26, 1983) was an American songwriter, actor, syndicated columnist, Broadway composer, radio legend, screenwriter, musical arranger and TV host.

== Biography ==
O'Keefe was born in Hartford, Connecticut. His father was actor Michael O'Keefe. He attended the College of the Sacred Heart in Wimbledon, London, before entering the University of Notre Dame in South Bend, Indiana, in 1917. At Notre Dame, he was a member of the Glee Club and a Class Poet. He graduated cum laude in 1921.

O'Keefe began as a vaudeville performer in the midwest for several years. In 1925, he went to New York City and became a Broadway performer, with his credits including The Third Little Show (1931) and Top-Notchers (1942). His other Broadway activities included writing the lyrics for Just a Minute (1928) and the music and lyrics for "The (Daring Young) Man on the Flying Trapeze" in George White's Scandals [1936] (1935).

By 1937, he wrote a syndicated humor column and filled in for such radio personalities as Walter Winchell, Edgar Bergen, Don McNeill and Garry Moore. He was the long-time master of ceremonies of the NBC show Double or Nothing from 1947 to 1954 and was a regular on that network's Monitor series.

O'Keefe also worked in television, presiding over talk shows and quiz shows for the CBS network. Producers Mark Goodson and Bill Todman hired him for their game show Two for the Money. When the show's usual host Herb Shriner had other commitments during the summer of 1954, O'Keefe took over for three months. He was the host for the first Emmy Awards ceremony, held on January 25, 1949, at the Hollywood Athletic Club. He replaced the original host, Rudy Vallée after he left town at the last minute.

O'Keefe wrote the musical scores of several Hollywood films. He introduced the popular song "The Daring Young Man on the Flying Trapeze" in 1934, and it became permanently associated with him.

O'Keefe became addicted to alcohol, and sought treatment in Cleveland, Ohio, during the late 1960s.

== Personal life ==
O'Keefe married Roberta Robinson in 1932, and they had two children. They separated in 1950.

== Death and legacy ==
He has a star on the Hollywood Walk of Fame in the category of radio. He died of congestive heart failure on June 26, 1983, at Little Company of Mary Hospital in Torrance, California, aged 82.

== Filmography ==
- 1929 The Sophomore - actor and music composer
- 1929 Red Hot Rhythm - actor, music composer and lyricist
- 1930 Dancing Sweeties - music composer
- 1930 Sweet Kitty Bellairs - music composer
- 1931 The Smart Set-Up - actor
- 1935 Vagabond Lady - music composer and lyricist
- 1936 Prison Shadows - actor
- 1938 Go Chase Yourself - screenwriter
- 1941 Too Many Blondes - music arranger
- 1952 Two for the Money (TV Series) - guest host
- 1954 Screen Snapshots: Hollywood Stars on Parade - himself
- 1956 The NBC Comedy Hour (Episode #1.16) - actor (himself)
