= Sam Levenson =

American humorist (1911–1980)

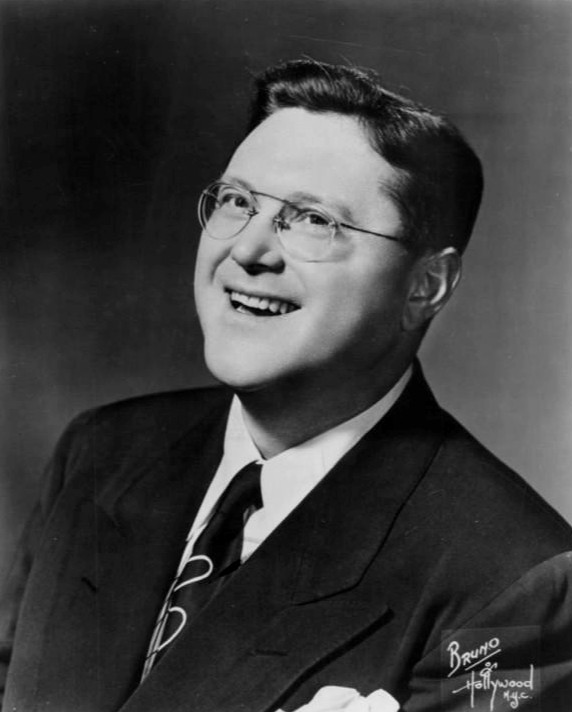
- Levenson in 1954
- Born: December 28, 1911
- Died: August 27, 1980 (aged 68); Brooklyn, New York

Samuel Levenson (December 28, 1911 – August 27, 1980) was an American humorist, writer, teacher, television host, and journalist.

== Personal life ==
Born in 1911, he grew up in a large Jewish immigrant family in Brooklyn, New York. He graduated from Brooklyn College in 1934. He married Esther Levine (1910–1999) and had two children, Emily and Conrad, the latter a graduate of Columbia University, an architect, resident of New York City, and father of four children.

For fifteen years, Levenson taught high school Spanish.

== Career ==
From 1949 to 1954, Levenson was a panelist on the CBS series This Is Show Business, along with playwright George S. Kaufman and Abe Burrows.

In 1950, he and fellow comedian Joe E. Lewis were the first members of the New York Friars' Club to be roasted. The club has roasted a member every year since the inaugural roasting. He had the Sam Levenson Show on CBS television in 1952.

In 1956, he hosted the game show Two for the Money, having replaced fellow humorist Herb Shriner. From 1959 to 1964, he hosted The Sam Levenson Show. Over a span of more than a decade, he appeared on Toast of the Town (AKA The Ed Sullivan Show) twenty-one times, in addition to frequently serving as a substitute host on CBS's Arthur Godfrey Time. He was a guest host on The Price Is Right and was a panelist on many other television programs such as Password and What's My Line? Levenson also had a cameo in the film A Face in the Crowd. Levenson also appeared multiple times on The Tonight Show Starring Johnny Carson through the 1970s. Levenson wrote the well-known poem "Time Tested Beauty Tips" for his grandchild, which has become falsely attributed to Audrey Hepburn.

Levenson was originally a Spanish teacher at Samuel J. Tilden High School in Brooklyn, New York. In 1965, Tilden High School honored Levenson with its Lefkowitz Award for distinguished service. He was an author and wrote Everything But Money (1966); the bestseller Sex and the Single Child (1969); In One Era and Out the Other (1973); You Can Say That Again, Sam! (1975); and You Don't Have to be in Who's Who to Know What's What (1979). Levenson appeared frequently in the "Borscht Belt" hotels of the Catskill Mountains. He and his family were guests at Arthur Stone's bungalow each summer from the 1950s until the 1960s and frequently out on Stone's 1947 Chris Craft, King Arthur. Stone was married to Sam's cousin, Judy. Their daughter, Maura Stone, changed careers late in life from international banking to acclaimed author due to her first novel, the award-winning, critically acclaimed Five-Star FLEECING, whose tone and humor mirrors Sam's trademark comedy.

The 150-seat Sam Levenson Recital Hall at Brooklyn College was named after him in 1988 in gratitude for his donations over the years to the Performing Arts Center. A glazed porcelain bust of him graces the hall's rear wall. The library of Franklin K. Lane High School, from which he graduated in 1930, is named for him, and a large portrait painting of him hangs on the north wall of the library. During Lane High School's rededication ceremony in the fall of 1976, Levenson was an honored guest and gave a humorous speech about his days as a student.

Levenson died of a heart attack in Long Island College Hospital on August 27, 1980. He was 68.

One of his brothers was the WPA muralist and artist, teacher, and art critic Michael Lenson.
