= Nearly Married =

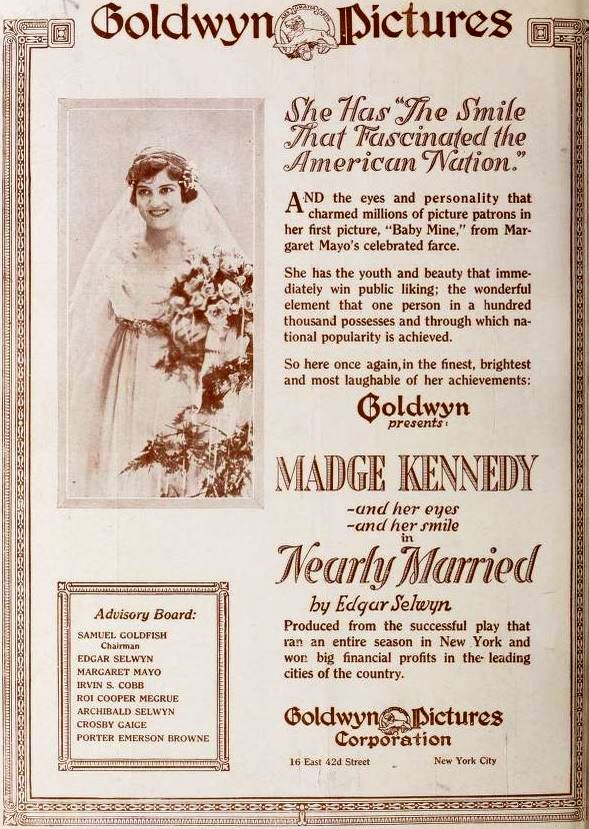
- Film poster
- Directed by: Chester Withey
- Written by: Lawrence McCloskey (scenario)
- Story by: Margaret Mayo
- Based on: Nearly Married by Edgar Selwyn
- Produced by: Samuel Goldwyn
- Cinematography: Arthur Edeson
- Distributed by: Goldwyn Pictures
- Release date: November 18, 1917 (United States)
- Running time: 60 mins.
- Country: United States
- Language: Silent (English intertitles)

Nearly Married is a 1917 American silent comedy film directed by Chester Withey and starring Madge Kennedy. It is based on a 1913 stage play of the same name by Edgar Selwyn. It also featured an early film appearance by future gossip columnist Hedda Hopper.

The Library of Congress's new (Dec. 2013) American Silent Feature Film Survival Database has this film listed as being an abridgement in their collection.

== Plot ==
As described in a film magazine, on the evening of Betty Griffon's (Madge Kennedy) scheduled wedding the guests are assembled, the minister is waiting, but no bride appears. Betty is waiting for her brother Dick (Barthelmess), who is out celebrating his admission to the bar. When it dawns on him that it is his duty to give his sister away in marriage, he rushes out, steals an automobile, and is arrested. Betty and Harry Lindsey (Thomas) are married and are about to leave on their honeymoon when word comes of Dick's arrest. Harry is disgusted by Dick and leaves the house. Dick, anxious to secure a legal case, urges his sister to get a divorce. Legal proceedings are instituted but before the granting of the decree the couple find that they still love each other so plan to elope. The arrival of Dick with the divorce decree upsets this plan. They start to make another attempt at marriage but discover that, due to the insertion of a clause in the decree by Betty, they cannot get remarried in New York. The couple then plan to get married in New Jersey, but Betty finds Harry's hired co-respondent for the divorce in his room, so Betty refuses to accompany him. Utterly disgusted, Harry is about to leave when Betty denounces her brother and begs Harry to take her with him, which he does.

== Cast ==
- Madge Kennedy as Betty Griffon
- Frank M. Thomas as Harry Lindsey
- Mark Smith as Tom Robinson
- Alma Tell as Gertrude Robinson
- Richard Barthelmess as Dick Griffon
- Hedda Hopper as Hattie King
