= Lollipop (musical) =

- Sheet Music Cover
- Music: Vincent Youmans
- Lyrics: Zelda Sears & Walter De Leon
- Book: Zelda Sears

Lollipop is a musical comedy in three acts with book by Zelda Sears, lyrics by Sears and Walter De Leon, and music by Vincent Youmans. The show was produced by Henry W. Savage at the Knickerbocker Theatre, and opened January 21, 1924.

It was staged by Ira Hands, choreographed by Bert French, John Tiller, and Mary Read, costume design by Schneider-Anderson Company, Bergdorf Goodman, and Finchley, and scenic design by Sheldon K. Viele and William Castle. It ran for 152 performances, closing on May 31, 1924

The cast of included Ada May (Laura Lamb), Zelda Sears (Mrs. Garrity), Nick Long, Jr. (Omar K. Garrity), Adora Andrews (Mrs. Mason), Gloria Dawn (Virginia), Aline McGill (Tessie), Mark Smith (Parkinson), Leonard Ceiley (Don Carlos), and Virginia Smith (Petunia).

The plot concerns Laura Lamb (Ada May), nicknamed “Lollipop” at an orphanage, and still called that even after she is adopted by a rich, catty lady named Mrs. Garrity (Zelda Sears). Laura meets an attractive plumber at the Garrity's, is accused of stealing Mrs. Garrity's purse, from which she is acquitted, and attends a masked ball in costume.

Lollipop was Youmans’ first score without a co-composer. He was teamed with lyricist Zelda Sears, one of the few women lyricists writing for Broadway. When Lollipop opened, Youmans had three shows running simultaneously.

== Songs ==
Act 1

- “Love in a Cottage”
- “Honey-Bun”
- “Time and a Half for Overtime”
- “Take a Little One Step”
- “Tie a String Around Your Finger”

Act 2

- “When We Are Married”
- “An Orphan Is the Girl for Me”
- “Bo Koo
- “Going Rowing”

Act 3

- “Deep In My Heart”

== Sources ==
- Boardman, Gerald. Days to Be Happy, Years to Be Sad, New York: Oxford University Press(1982)
