= Madge Kennedy =

American actress (1891–1987)

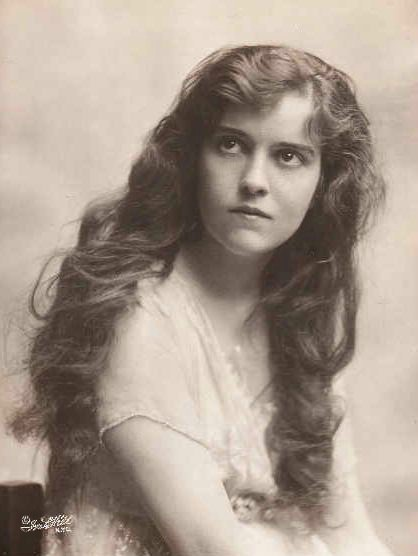
- Kennedy, ca. 1916
- Born: April 19, 1891; Chicago, Illinois, U.S.
- Died: June 9, 1987 (aged 96); Woodland Hills, Los Angeles, California, U.S.
- Occupation: Actress
- Years active: 1912–1976
- Spouses: Harold Bolster (m. 1918; died 1927) William B. Hanley Jr. (m. 1939; died 1959)

Madge Kennedy (April 19, 1891 – June 9, 1987) was a stage, film and television actress whose career began as a stage actress in 1912 and flourished in motion pictures during the silent film era. In 1921, journalist Heywood Broun described her as "the best farce actress in New York".

== Early years ==
Kennedy was born in Chicago. Her father was a judge in a criminal court. After she and her family lived in California, she moved to New York City with her mother to paint. She studied two years at the Art Students League, planning to be an illustrator. Luis Mora saw her art work and recommended that she go to Siasconset (in Nantucket, Massachusetts) for a summer.

== Career ==
=== Theater ===
The Siasconset colony was evenly divided among actors and artists, and painters often gave theatrical performances.

Kennedy appeared in a skit written by Kenneth and Roy Webb, and she impressed professional Harry Woodruff, who said "She could act rings around anybody." As a result, she was offered the lead opposite Woodruff in The Genius. Soon she was in Cleveland, where Robert McLaughlin gave her work with his stock company.

Kennedy first appeared on Broadway in Little Miss Brown (1912), a farce in three acts presented at the 48th Street Theater. Critics found Kennedy's performance most pleasing, writing "Miss Kennedy's youth, good looks, and marked sense of fun helped her to make a decidedly favorable impression last night." That same year she appeared in The Point of View.

1914 saw her in the popular Twin Beds, and in 1915, she scored a sensational hit at the Eltinge Theater as Blanny Wheeler opposite John Cumberland in Avery Hopwood's farce Fair and Warmer, which ran 377 performances. Critic Louis Vincent DeFoe wrote "Madge Kennedy proves anew that consummate art is involved even in farcical acting." In the late 1910s, she left the stage for three years to appear in moving pictures for Samuel Goldwyn (see "Films" below).

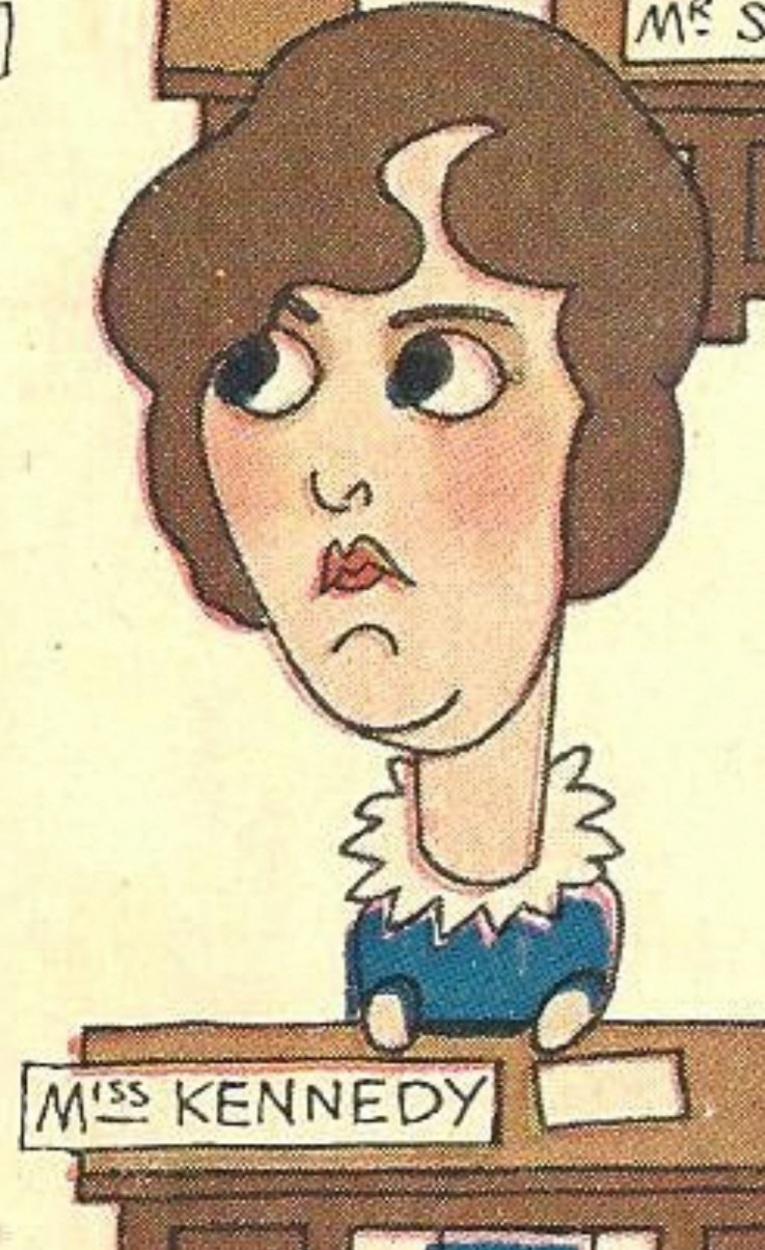
Caricature by Ralph Barton, 1925

Kennedy returned to the New York stage in November 1920, playing in Cornered, staged at the Astor Theatre. Produced by Henry Savage, the play, taken from the writing of Dodson Mitchell, offered Kennedy a dual role.

In 1923, she starred opposite W.C. Fields in Poppy, where she enjoyed top billing. In the comedy Beware of Widows (1925), which was produced at Maxine Elliott Theatre, a reviewer for The New York Times noted Kennedy's physical beauty as well as her skill as a comedian.

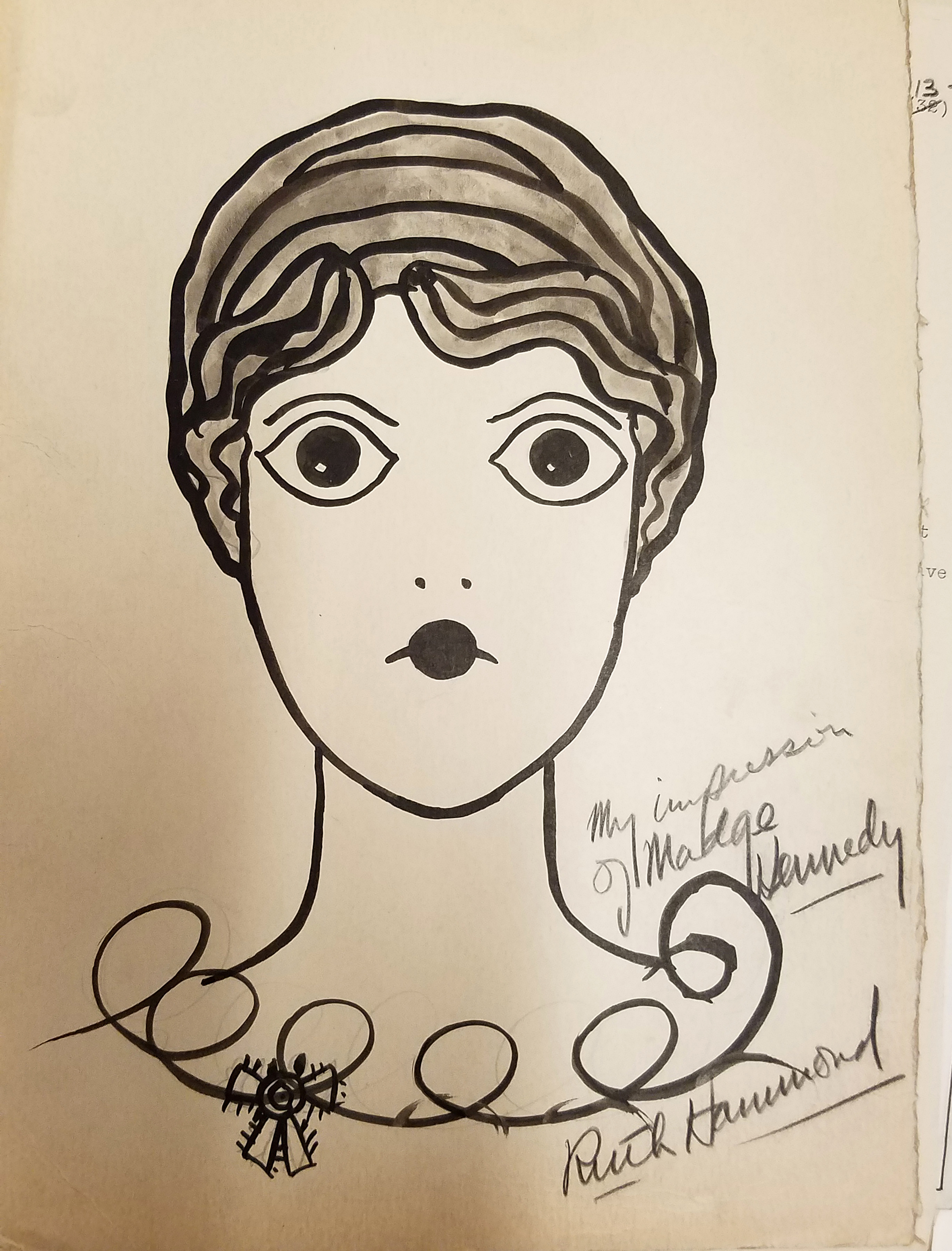
Caricature of Madge Kennedy by actress Ruth Hammond for Manuel Rosenberg, 1925

Later, she starred in Philip Barry's Paris Bound (1927) and in Noël Coward's Private Lives (1931), having succeeded Gertrude Lawrence.

After an absence of 33 years, she returned to Broadway in August 1965, appearing with her friend Ruth Gordon in Gordon and Kanin's A Very Rich Woman.

=== Films ===
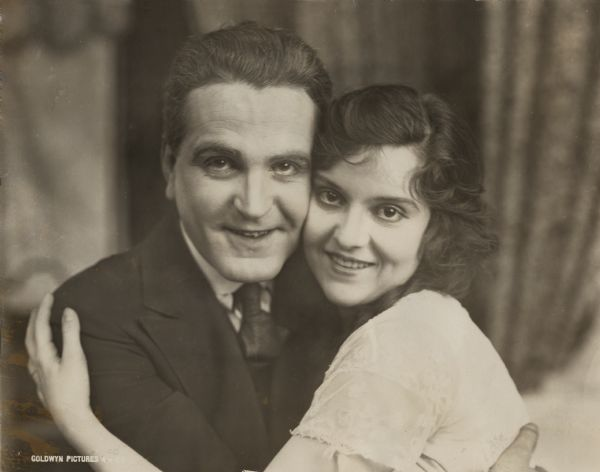
Frank Morgan and Madge Kennedy in a publicity still for the 1917 silent comedy Baby Mine.

In 1917, Sam Goldwyn of Goldwyn Pictures signed Kennedy to a film contract. She starred in 21 five-reel films, such as Baby Mine (1917), Nearly Married (1917), Our Little Wife (1918), The Service Star (1918), and Dollars and Sense (1920).

Kennedy told a reporter in 1916: "I have discovered that one of the best ways to act is to make your mind as vacant as possible." In 1918, Our Little Wife premiered with Kennedy playing the role of Dodo Warren. The story is about a woman whose marriage is both humorous and sad. The screenplay was adapted from a comedy by Avery Hopwood.

A Perfect Lady (1918) was released in December and was taken from a stage play by Channing Pollock and Rennold Wolf. Kennedy co-starred with James Montgomery. In 1923, she starred in The Purple Highway. The screenplay is an adaptation of the stage play Dear Me, written by Luther Reed and Hale Hamilton.

The 1920s were a productive period for Kennedy. Following The Purple Highway, she had prominent roles in Three Miles Out (1924), Scandal Sheet (1925), Bad Company (1925), Lying Wives (1925), Oh, Baby! (1926), and Walls Tell Tales (1928).

She was out of motion pictures until she resumed her career in The Marrying Kind (1952) and Main Street to Broadway (1953).

In the late 1950s, she combined TV work with roles in movies like The Rains of Ranchipur (1955), The Catered Affair (1956), Lust for Life (1956), Houseboat (1958), A Nice Little Bank That Should Be Robbed (1958), Plunderers of Painted Flats (1959), and North by Northwest (1959). She has an uncredited part as a secretary in the Marilyn Monroe film Let's Make Love (1960).

Her film career endured into the 1970s with roles in They Shoot Horses, Don't They? (1969), The Baby Maker (1970), The Day of the Locust (1975), and Marathon Man (1976).

=== Radio and television ===
As a guest on the Red Davis series (1934) over NBC Radio and WJZ (WABC-AM) network, Kennedy worked with Burgess Meredith who had the title role. She was written into the full script by Elaine Sterne Carrington, the program's creator.

Kennedy was prolific in terms of her television appearances beginning with an episode of the Schlitz Playhouse of Stars (1954). Her additional performances in television series are Studio 57 (1954), General Electric Theater (1954), Science Fiction Theater (1955), The Life and Legend of Wyatt Earp (1960), The Best of the Post (1961), Alfred Hitchcock Presents (1956–1961), The Alfred Hitchcock Hour (1962), The Twilight Zone (1963), and CBS Playhouse (1967). She also had a semi-recurring role as Theodore Cleaver's Aunt Martha on the hit family sitcom Leave It to Beaver (1957–63). She played June Cleaver's aunt and the Beaver's great-aunt. Ms. Kennedy also appeared as Mimi (the wife of Albert, Felix's grandfather played by Tony Randall) in The Odd Couple (1972).

=== Producing ===
Kennedy and her husband, Harold Bolster (who had been an executive with Goldwyn), formed Kenma Corporation, a film production company. Kenma made The Purple Highway (1923) and Three Miles Out (1924), both of which starred Kennedy but had little success.

== Personal life and death ==
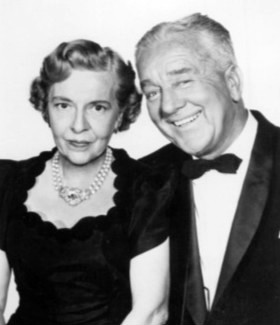
In 1959, with silent screen star Jack Mulhall in publicity photo for Goodyear Theater

Kennedy's contract with Goldwyn ended in 1921. She returned to the stage so that she could be close to her husband, broker Harold Bolster, in New York. Bolster died on August 3, 1927 from an illness he contracted months before during a business trip to South America. He was a member of the New York banking firm of Bennett, Bolster & Coghill. Bolster was 38 and a veteran of World War I. Kennedy inherited more than $500,000 when he died.

She wed William B. Hanley Jr., in Kingman, Arizona on August 13, 1934. Hanley was an actor and radio personality. The couple resided in Los Angeles. Kennedy retired temporarily after her marriage. The couple were married until Hanley's death in 1959.

She enjoyed outdoor activities such as playing golf, horseback riding and driving cars. She owned a Willys-Knight Great Six which she drove avidly at the time she was touring in 1929 in the play Lulu. In August 1929, she was sued in a Norwich, Connecticut, court for damages she caused in a car accident on the Boston Post Road near Groton, Connecticut, in June 1928. The plaintiffs asked for $13,000.

Madge Kennedy died of respiratory failure at the Motion Picture & Television Country House and Hospital in Woodland Hills, California, in 1987. She was 96.

== Recognition ==
Kennedy has a star at 1600 Vine Street in the Motion Pictures section of the Hollywood Walk of Fame. It was dedicated on February 8, 1960.

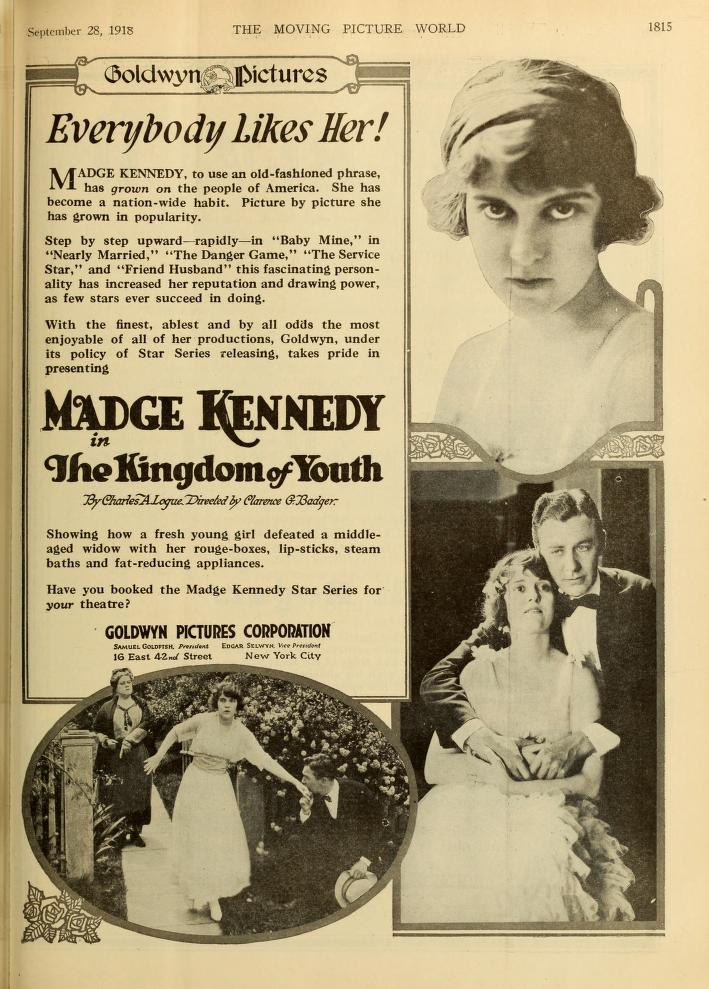
The Kingdom of Youth (1918)

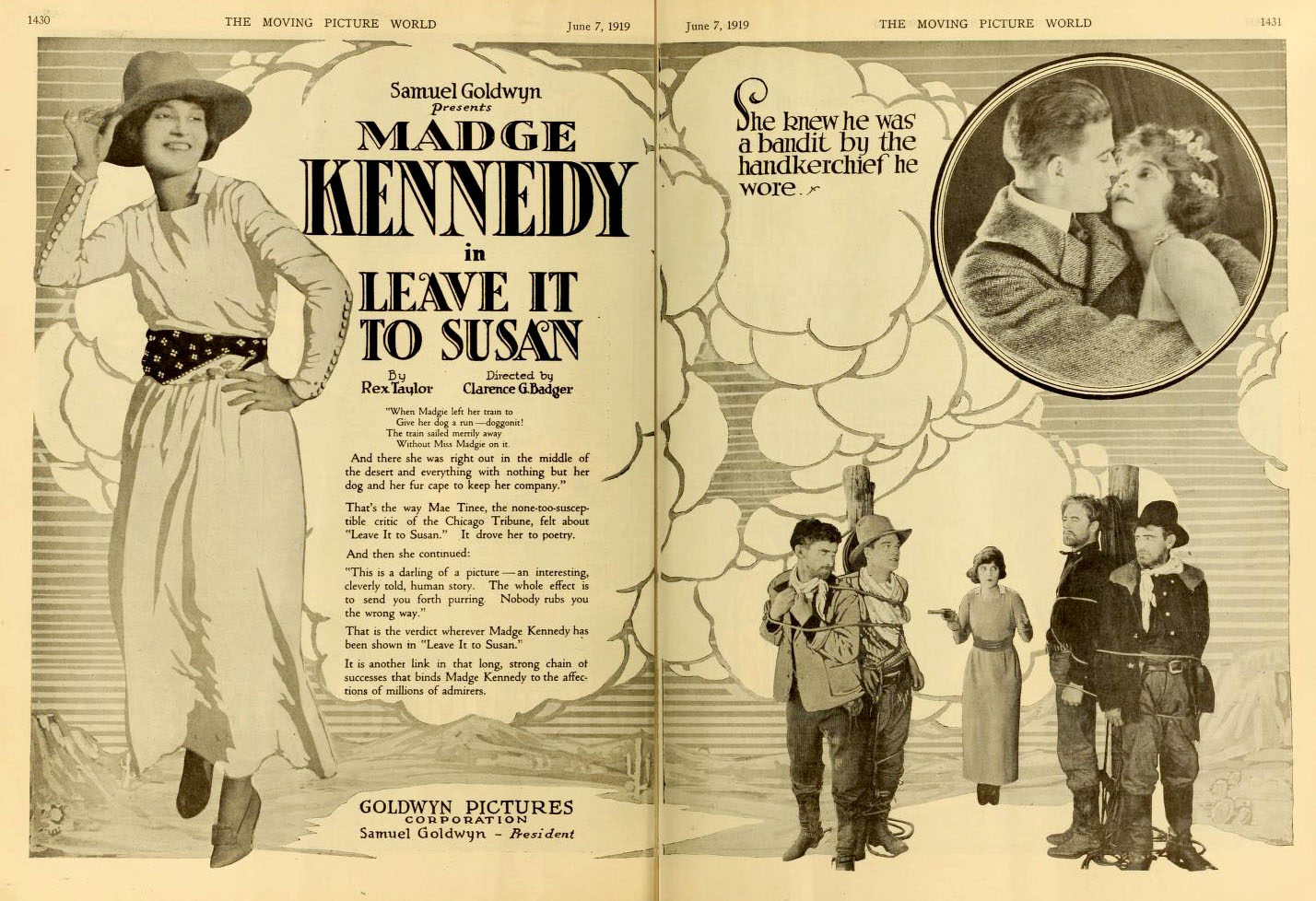
Advertisement for Leave it to Susan (1919).

== Filmography ==
Silent

Year	Title	Role	Notes
1917	Baby Mine	Zoie	
1917	Nearly Married	Betty Griffon	
1918	Our Little Wife	Dodo Warren	Lost film
1918	The Danger Game	Clytie Rogers	
1918	The Fair Pretender	Sylvia Maynard	
1918	The Service Star	Marilyn March	Lost film
1918	Friend Husband	Dorothy Dean	
1918	Stake Uncle Sam to Play Your Hand		Short
1918	The Kingdom of Youth	Ruth Betts	
1918	A Perfect Lady	Lucille Le Jambon, aka Lucy Higgins	
1919	Day Dreams	Primrose	Lost film
1919	Daughter of Mine	Rosie Mendelsohn / Lady Diantha	
1919	Leave It to Susan	Susan Burbridge	Lost film
1919	Through the Wrong Door	Isabel Carter	Lost film
1919	Strictly Confidential	Fanny O'Gorman	Incomplete
1920	The Blooming Angel	Floss	
1920	Dollars and Sense	Hazel Farron	Extant; Library of Congress
1920	The Truth	Becky Warder	
1920	Help Yourself	Emily Ray	Lost film
1921	The Highest Bidder	Sally Raeburn	Lost film
1921	The Girl with the Jazz Heart	Kittie Swasher / Miriam Smith	
1921	Oh Mary Be Careful	Mary Meacham	Extant Library of Congress
1923	The Purple Highway	April Blair	Lost film
1924	Three Miles Out	Molly Townsend	
1925	Scandal Street	Sheila Kane	Lost film
1925	Bad Company	Gloria Waring	Lost film
1925	Lying Wives	Margery Burkley	Incomplete film
1926	Oh, Baby!	Dorothy Brennan	Lost film
1928	Walls Tell Tales		Short

Talkies

Year	Title	Role	Notes
1952	The Marrying Kind	Judge Anne B. Carroll	
1953	Main Street to Broadway	Mrs. Cope in Fantasy Sequence	
1955	The Rains of Ranchipur	Mrs. Smiley	
1956	Three Bad Sisters	Martha Craig	
1956	The Catered Affair	Mrs. Joe Halloran	
1956	Lust for Life	Anna Cornelia Van Gogh	
1958	Houseboat	Mrs. Farnsworth	
1958	A Nice Little Bank That Should Be Robbed	Grace Havens	
1959	Plunderers of Painted Flats	Mary East	
1959	North by Northwest	Mrs. Finlay, US Intelligence Agency official	Uncredited
1960	Let's Make Love	Miss Manners, Clement's Secretary	Uncredited
1969	They Shoot Horses, Don't They?	Mrs. Laydon	
1970	The Baby Maker	Tish's Grandmother	
1975	The Day of the Locust	Mrs. Johnson	
1976	Marathon Man	Lady in Bank	

=== Television ===
Year	Title	Role	Notes
1954	Lux Video Theatre	Ma Glover	Season 4 Episode 23: "Borrowed Life"
1954	Schlitz Playhouse of Stars	Clara Matheson	Season 4 Episode 1: "The Secret"
1954	The Lineup	Victim's Mother	Season 1 Episode 8: "Cop Killer"
1954	Studio 57	Grandmother	Season 1 Episode 14: "Christmas Every Day"
1955	General Electric Theater	Henrietta Mallory	Season 3 Episode 36: "Star in the House"
1955	Climax!	—N/a	Season 1 Episode 28: "The Dark Fleece"
1955	Science Fiction Theatre	Mrs. Canby	Season 1 Episode 28: "The Unexplored"
1956	The Ford Television Theatre	Helen Quade	Season 5 Episode 6: "Sometimes It Happens"
1956	Alfred Hitchcock Presents	Laura Crabtree	Season 1 Episode 27: "Help Wanted"
1957-63	Leave It to Beaver	Aunt Martha Bronson	5 episodes
1958	Official Detective	Miss Greenville	Season 1 Episode 34: "Murder in a Girls School"
1959	Goodyear Theatre	Birdie	Season 2 Episode 15: "I Remember Caviar"
1959	Alfred Hitchcock Presents	Laura Crabtree	Season 4 Episode 34: "A True Account"
1959	Alfred Hitchcock Presents	Mrs. Barnes	Season 5 Episode 14: "Graduating Class"
1960	The Life and Legend of Wyatt Earp	Mary Rowland	Season 5 Episode 26: "Don't Get Tough with a Sailor"
1960	Alfred Hitchcock Presents	Mrs. Carter	Season 6 Episode 10: "Sybilla"
1961	The Best of the Post	Mrs. Bedenbaugh	Season 1 Episode 10: "Carnival of Fear"
1961	Alfred Hitchcock Presents	Mrs. Baldwin	Season 6 Episode 26: "Coming, Mama"
1962	The Alfred Hitchcock Hour	Mrs. MacFarlane	Season 1 Episode 2: "Don't Look Behind You"
1963	The Twilight Zone	Colonist	Season 4 Episode 16: "On Thursday We Leave for Home"
1967	CBS Playhouse	Mrs. Flagler	Season 1 Episode 2: "Do Not Go Gentle Into That Good Night"
1968	Julia	Lady Employer	Season 1 Episode 4: "Homework Isn't Housework"
1972	The Odd Couple	Mimi	Season 2 Episode 18: "Where's Grandpa?"
