= Main Street to Broadway =

1953 film by Tay Garnett

- Directed by: Tay Garnett
- Written by: Samson Raphaelson (writer); Robert E. Sherwood (story)
- Produced by: Lester Cowan
- Starring: Mary Murphy; Agnes Moorehead; Herb Shriner
- Cinematography: James Wong Howe
- Edited by: Gene Fowler, Jr.
- Music by: Ann Ronell
- Production company: Metro-Goldwyn-Mayer
- Distributed by: Loew's Inc.
- Release date: October 13, 1953
- Running time: 103 minutes
- Country: United States
- Language: English
- Budget: $1,350,000
- Box office: $444,000

Main Street to Broadway is a 1953 American romantic musical comedy-drama film by independent producer Lester Cowan, his final credit, in collaboration with The Council of the Living Theatre, which provided tie-up with a number of well-known Broadway names. The backstage story features Tom Morton as an aspiring playwright who hopes to stage a Broadway production, Mary Murphy, as a young lady from Indiana, and radio-TV humorist Herb Shriner in a rare acting role as a hardware store owner.

Tallulah Bankhead is featured in a parody sequence of herself. The list of Broadway luminaries also playing themselves, in smaller cameos, includes Ethel Barrymore, Lionel Barrymore (in his last film), Shirley Booth, Louis Calhern, Faye Emerson, Rex Harrison, Helen Hayes, Mary Martin, Lilli Palmer, John Van Druten and Cornel Wilde. Included is New York baseball manager Leo Durocher. Many others are unidentified, such as Vivian Blaine, glimpsed in a theater lobby.

In one scene, Richard Rodgers and Oscar Hammerstein II create a new song, "There's Music in You", then perform it for their friends, with Rodgers at the piano and Hammerstein singing the vocals. Mary Martin is later seen rehearsing the song for director Joshua Logan.

The black-and-white film, which has a running time of 97 minutes, was directed by Tay Garnett, screenplay by Samson Raphaelson, based on a story Robert E. Sherwood, and photographed by James Wong Howe. Sequences were filmed in New York, with shots at the Martin Beck and old Empire theaters (the Empire was set to be demolished the year the film was released). Others as story characters include Gertrude Berg, as a landlady, Agnes Moorehead, Rosemary de Camp, Arthur Shields, and, in a fantasy sequence, Florence Bates, Madge Kennedy, Carl Benton Reid, Frank Ferguson, and Robert Bray.

== Reception ==
According to MGM records, the film earned $416,000 in the US and Canada and only $28,000 elsewhere.
