= Two for the Money (game show) =

- Genre: Game show
- Directed by: Paul Alter
- Presented by: Herb Shriner; Sam Levenson
- Country of origin: United States
- Original language: English

Production
- Production company: Goodson-Todman Productions

Original release
- Network: NBC; CBS
- Release: 1952 – 1957

Two for the Money is an American game show television program that ran from 1952 to 1957. The show ran for one season on NBC, and four seasons on CBS. It was a Mark Goodson-Bill Todman production, and was initially sponsored by Old Gold cigarettes. Humorist Herb Shriner was the host for most of the show's run, with fellow humorist Sam Levenson hosting the last season. The game show was initially directed by Paul Alter.

With the success of Groucho Marx and his show, You Bet Your Life, which aired on NBC, Mark Goodson was looking for a similar format that was as much a showcase for the host as it was a game. Two for the Money was just that, with as much of Shriner's homespun Hoosier humor as there was actual game play. But there was a game to be played, and its format was fairly simple.

In the first round, a pair of contestants would be given a category, and would come up with as many correct answers that fit the category as possible within a fifteen-second time period. An example of a category: "States whose names end in 'A'." Each correct answer was worth $5.00. The other important rule is that the contestants had to alternate in giving their responses. Round two was much the same, but each correct answer's value was determined by the amount won in the first round — if the contestants won $25 in the first round, each correct second-round answer was worth that amount. The amount won in the second round would be the value of each correct answer in the third and final round.

Shriner had help in judging correct answers from Mason Welch Gross, a professor from Rutgers University. Dr. Gross would sound a buzzer should he catch the team repeating an answer or giving an incorrect answer. For a brief time while Dr. Gross was away, Walter Cronkite filled in. Dr. Gross eventually became the university's president, and namesake of its fine arts program.

Actor Walter O'Keefe and humorist and television personality Sam Levenson served as Shriner's substitutes. Kenny Williams (who from 1960, until before his death in 1984, would be the "voice" of nearly all the game shows produced by Merrill Heatter & Bob Quigley) was the announcer.

In 1957, Ed McMahon made his network television debut as the show's announcer. Milton Delugg conducted the show's orchestra. Dennis James was primary sponsor Old Gold cigarettes' spokesman; Bob Shepperd was the pitchman for other sponsors.

Beginning with its premiere and for much of its run, the audio portion of the show was taped and broadcast as a network radio offering, first on NBC Radio, then on CBS Radio when the television show moved to CBS. This mimicked the pattern already set by You Bet Your Life.

The show was also remade in the United Kingdom for the then-new ITV network in 1956, lasting only one series. The British version was hosted by Bernard Braden.

Seventeen-year-old Tom Brokaw, governor of South Dakota Boys' State, appeared with the real governor of South Dakota, Joe Foss, in 1957. Together they won $1,225, answering questions mainly about politics (one of the categories was "state governors," and one of Brokaw's answers, as he recounts in his autobiography, was "The honorable Joe Foss of South Dakota").

The series finished #14 in the Nielsen ratings for the 1954–1955 season. It received Emmy nominations for Best Audience Participation, Quiz or Panel Program in 1953 and 1954.

== Episode status ==
17 episodes survive at the UCLA Film and Television Archive. One episode is included in the set "Classic Game Shows & More", released by Mill Creek Entertainment.

171 out of the approximately 209 episodes from the Herb Shriner run survive at the Library of Congress. Combined with 11 exclusive to UCLA, the number comes out to 182.

The status of the Sam Levenson shows is unclear.

== Critical response ==
A review of Levenson's second episode in the trade publication Variety said that the show "appears to be uneven in entertainment qualities, rising and dipping according to the human interest of the contestants." Specifically, the review noted that in that episode Levenson's "humor clicked" with one couple, while the segment with another pair of contestants lacked spontaneity. The reviewer suggested that the show's format might be too confining for Levenson's talents.
