= Mark Smith (actor, born 1887) =

American actor (1887–1944)

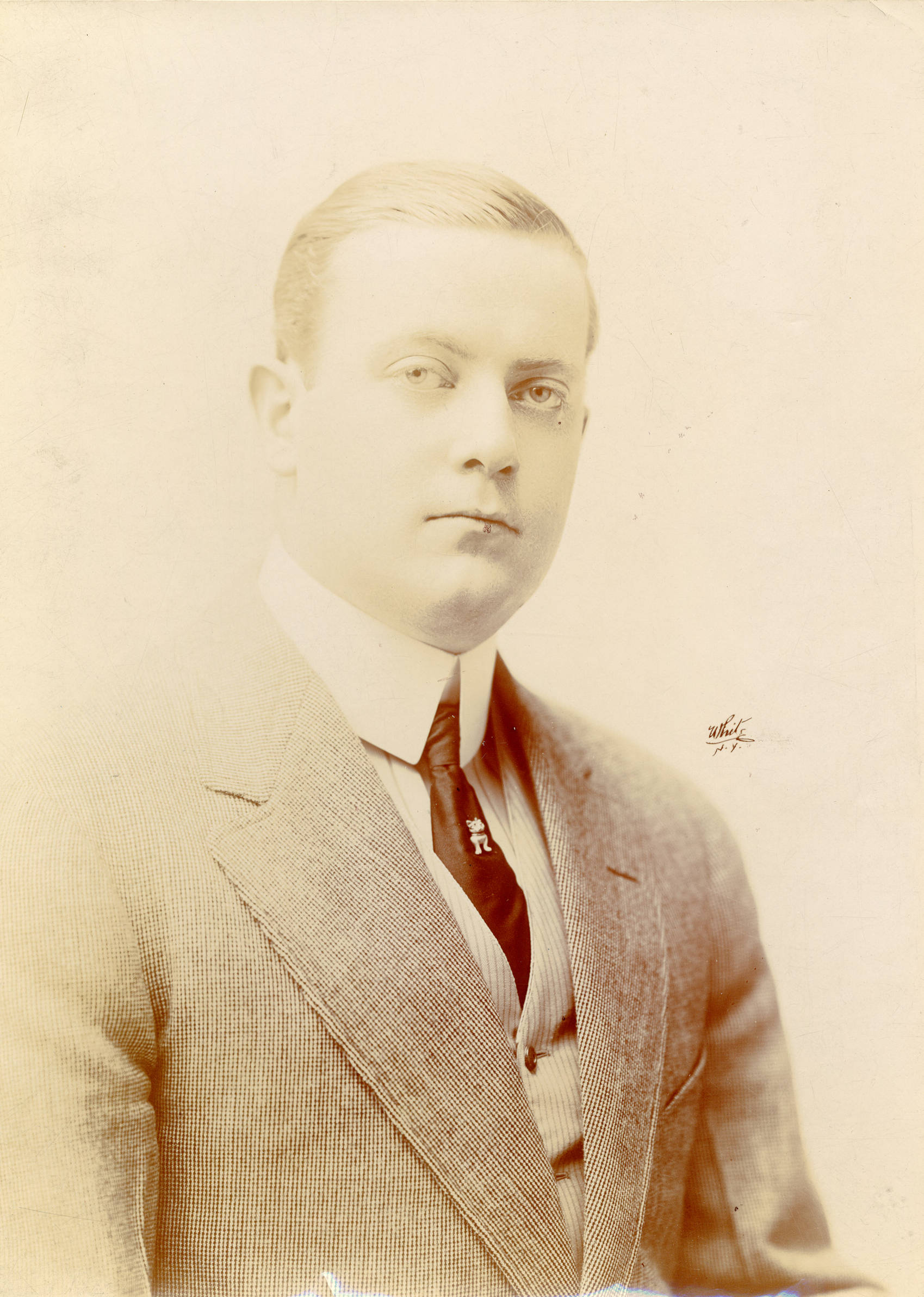
- Smith in 1909
- Born: April 16, 1887; New York City, U.S.
- Died: May 9, 1944 (aged 57); New York City, U.S.
- Occupation: Actor
- Years active: 1903–1944
- Spouse: Anna Muriel Feeney (m. 1909)
- Children: 1

Mark Smith (April 16, 1887 – May 9, 1944) was an American actor of stage, radio, and film. A fourth-generation American actor, he was a member of the Smith family of performers. He should not be confused with his grandfather and his father who also performed under the name Mark Smith.

Smith had a prolific career as both a stage and radio actor in New York City, and served a term as president of the New York chapter of the American Federation of Radio Artists. One of his better known radio characters was the role of Jiggs in Bringing Up Father. He also voiced the roles of Pop Foyle on Kitty Foyle, Deputy Paar on the murder mystery anthology Murder Clinic, and portrayed several characters on The Cisco Kid.

He appeared in many Broadway plays and musicals from 1903 through 1941, notably creating roles in original musicals by Kurt Weil, Vincent Youmans, Rudolf Friml, and Silvio Hein, and starring in original plays by David Belasco, Edgar Selwyn, William Le Baron, Guy Bolton and George Middleton among others. Smith also had roles in seven silent films that were released between the years 1915 and 1920. At the time of his death in 1944 The New York Times stated that he had performed in 70 different theaters in New York during his career, and "had appeared in more than 2,000 radio programs".

== Early life: 1887–1903 ==
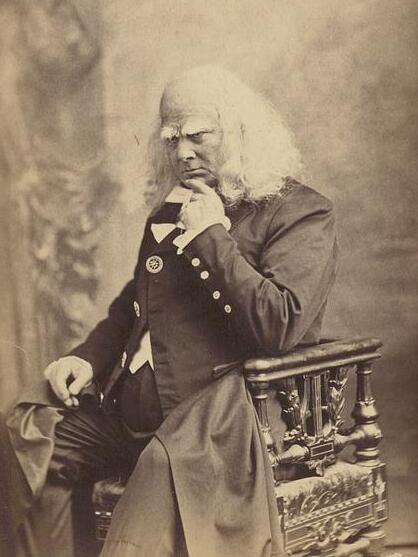
Mark Smith I (1829–1874)

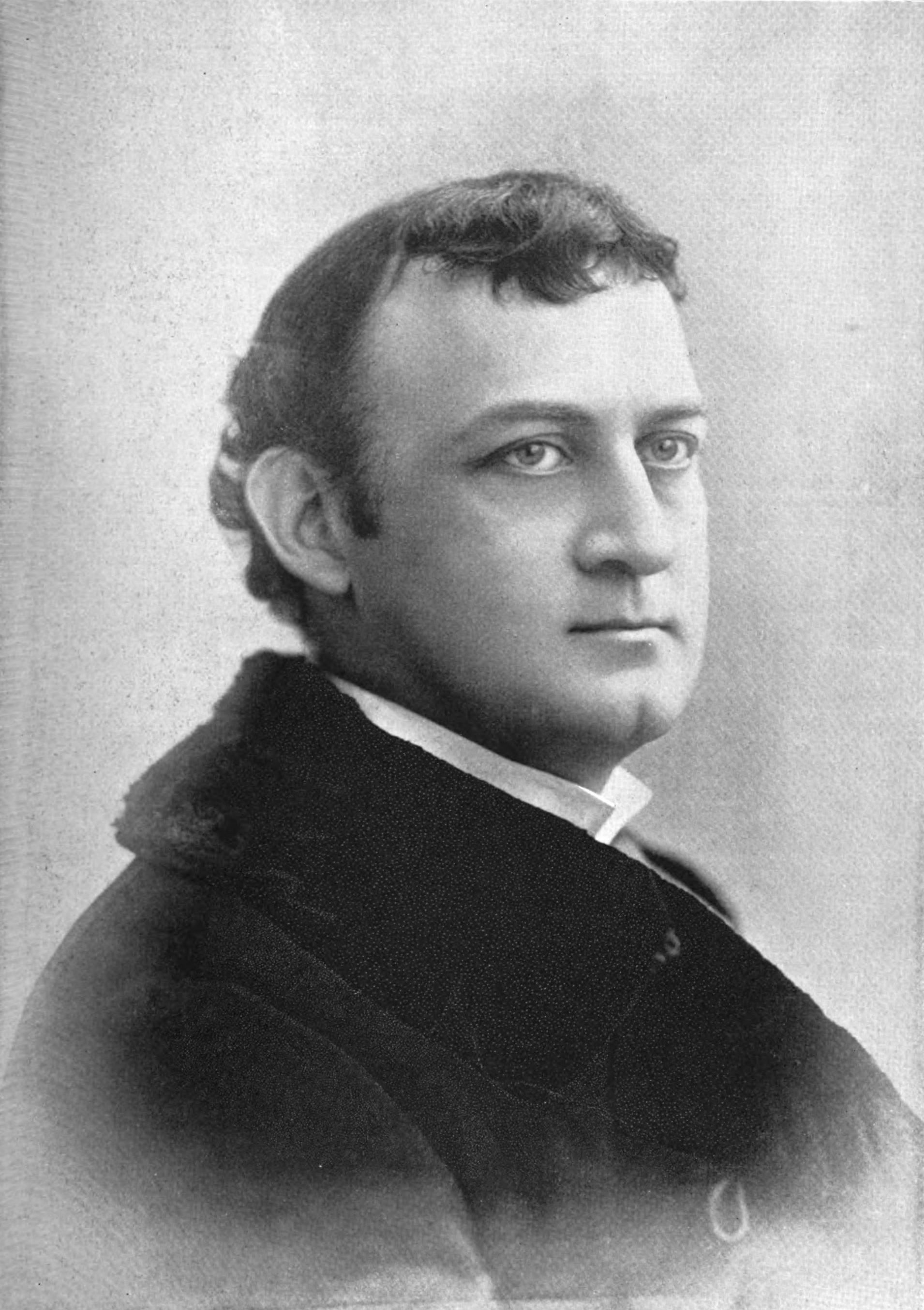
Mark Smith II (1855–1903)

Mark Smith's grandfather and father: actors of the same name

Mark E. Smith III was born in New York City on April 16, 1887. He was a fourth-generation American actor: both his grandfather and father were also actors who also performed under the name Mark Smith. His great-grandfather was the actor and impresario Sol Smith. His grandfather, Mark Smith I, was a Shakespearean actor and comedian who for a part of his career was manager of the 19th century Booth's Theatre on Broadway. He was considered one of the great American stage actors of the 19th century and earned the moniker "The Farren of the American stage".

Smith's father, Mark Smith II, was a baritone who had a career in comic operas and operettas with America's top light opera companies of the late 19th century. His mother, Cornelia "Nellie" Barbour, was also an actress. Mark Smith III began his stage career performing in small roles with his father in productions of two musicals by Charles H. Hoyt: A Milk White Flag and A Trip to Chinatown. Having never retired, Mark Smith II died from dropsy on September 20, 1903. His son continued the family's acting legacy.

== Early career: 1903–1909 ==
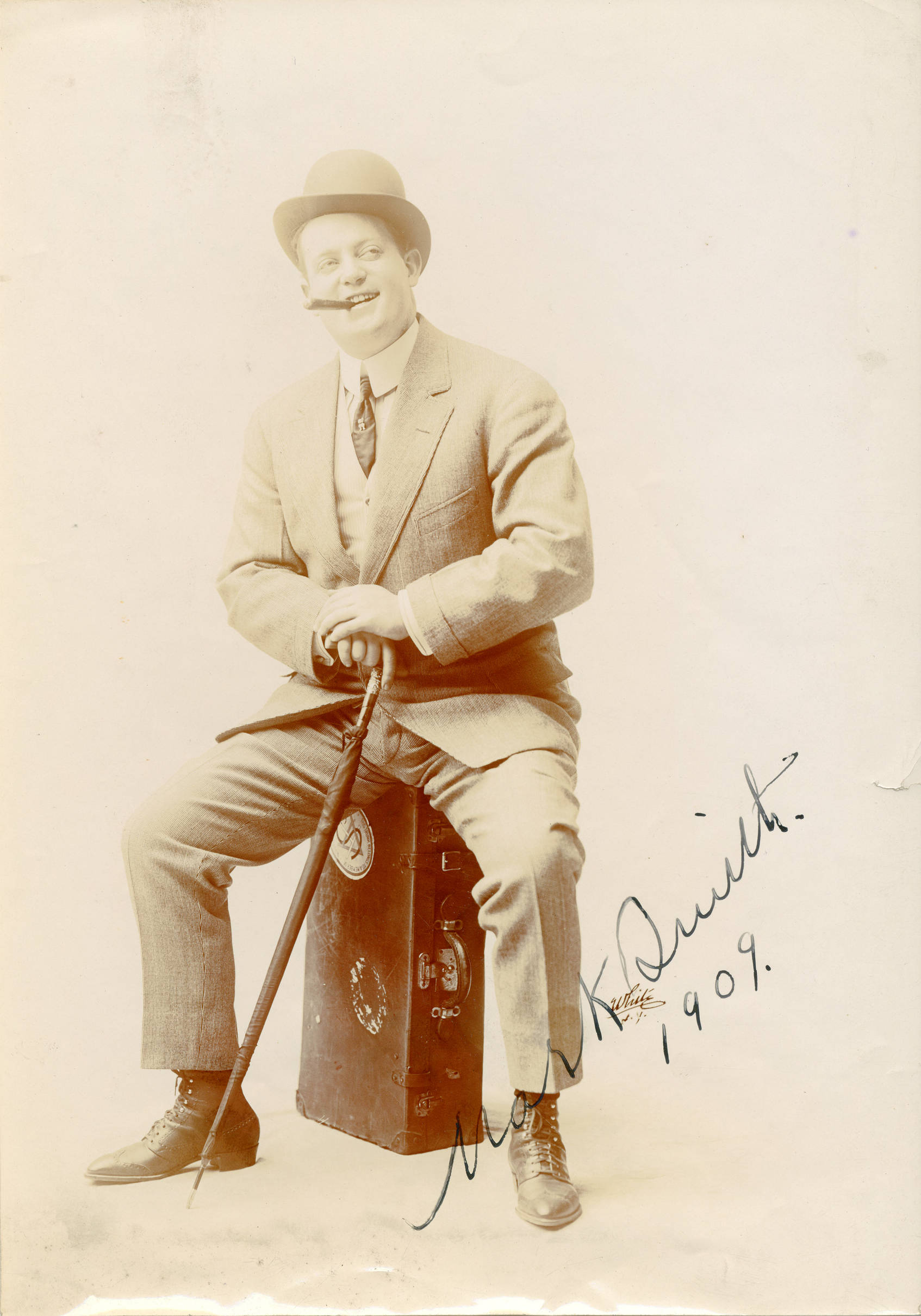
Smith in The Traveling Salesman

In 1903 Smith portrayed the Master of Ceremonies in David Belasco's Sweet Kitty Bellairs at the Lafayette Square Opera House in Washington, D.C., and at Broadway's Belasco Theatre. He later took over the larger parts of first Darby O'Donnovan and then Captain Tom Stafford in that work. He portrayed Autolycus in the 1904 Broadway revival of William Shakespeare's The Winter's Tale at the Booth's Theatre in a cast led by the actress Viola Allen as Hermione. In the 1906–1907 season he starred opposite Marie Cahill as Bishop Brigham Smudge in Silvio Hein's musical Marrying Mary which included a Broadway run at Daly's Theatre.

In 1908 Smith toured as Richard Hampton in David Higgins's play Captain Clay of Missouri. He then toured as Jack Walkham in Edgar Allan Woolf and George Sylvester Viereck's The Vampire, including performances at Broadway's Hackett Theatre and the Grand Opera House in Chicago in 1909. On May 9, 1909, Smith married the actress Anna Muriel Feeney. At the time of his marriage he was starring in the title role of James Forbes's The Traveling Salesman Park Theatre in Boston, a work he toured in opposite the actress Miriam Nesbitt as his character's love interest.

== Stage and silent film career in the 1910s and 1920s ==
Mark Smith

In 1912 Smith returned to Broadway as Harry Lyon in the original production of Helen Kraft and Frank Mandel's farce Our Wives at Wallack's Theatre. In 1913 he created the role of Tom Robinson in Edgar Selwyn's comedy Nearly Married at the Gaiety Theatre. In 1914 he portrayed Baron Felix Puppchen in Milton Lusk's musical The Dancing Duchess at the Casino Theatre. That same year he performed the role of Oscar Bridwell in J. C. Drum's Milady's Boudoir at the Garrick Theatre.

In 1915 Smith portrayed Hillary Bronson in Charles Klein's Cousin Lucy at the George M. Cohan's Theatre. This production utilized songs by Jerome Kern and had a cast led by the female impersonator Julian Eltinge. In 1917 he starred as Tobby Matthews in Willard Mack and Lou Tellegen's Blind Youth at the Theatre Republic, and continued in that work at the 39th Street Theatre in 1918. From 1915 through 1920 he also worked as a silent film actor. His film credits included Zaza (1915, as Cascart), Putting It Over (1916, Lemuel Z. Hawksberry), Nearly Married (1917, as Tom Robinson), Annexing Bill (1918, as George Frayne), A Damsel in Distress (1919, as Percy Marsh), The Vengeance of Durand (1919, as "Tabby" Livingston), and Something Different (1920, as Richard Bidgley).

In 1920 Smith performed the role of Rufus Paterson in Guy Bolton and George Middleton's The Cave Girl at Broadway's Longacre Theatre with actress Grace Valentine in the title role. In 1922 he starred as Ferdie Simpson in the Broadway musical Up in the Clouds which ran first at the Lyric Theatre before transferring to the 44th Street Theatre. In 1924 he portrayed Parkinson in Vincent Youmans, Walter De Leon, and Zelda Sears's musical Lollipop at the Knickerbocker Theatre.

In 1925 Smith starred as George Carroll in Edgar Selwyn and William Le Baron's Something To Brag About at the Booth Theatre, and in 1925–1926 he appeared at the Sam H. Harris Theatre as Louis in René Fauchois's The Monkey Talks. He returned to Broadway later in 1926 as Richard Dennison in the musical Kitty's Kisses by composer Con Conrad. In 1927 he portrayed Big Bill in the Broadway production of Rudolf Friml's musical White Eagle at the Casino Theatre.

== Later career on the stage and in radio ==
In 1930 Smith starred as The Husband opposite Alice Brady as his wife in Fanny Hatton's Love, Honor and Betray at Eltinge 42nd Street Theatre. In 1932 he performed the role of Lucien Bridier in the Broadway production of Hans Kottow's The Stork is Dead at the 48th Street Theatre. In 1938 he created the role of Tienhoven in the original production of Kurt Weill's Knickerbocker Holiday at the Ethel Barrymore Theatre. He portrayed Sir Toby Belch in the 1940–1941 Broadway revival of Shakespeare's Twelfth Night at the St. James Theatre.

Smith had a prolific career in radio during the 1930s and 1940s. According to The New York Times he had performed on more than 2,000 radio programs by 1941. His best known role on radio was the part of Jiggs in Bringing Up Father. He also voiced several different characters on The Cisco Kid, was the voice of Pop Foyle on Kitty Foyle, and provided the voice of Deputy Paar on the murder mystery anthology Murder Clinic. In 1937 he was elected president of the New York chapter of the American Federation of Radio Artists. He was also a member of the Actors' Equity Association and volunteered with the Actors Fund of America.

Smith died at his home in New York City on May 9, 1944. The cause of death was cirrhosis of the liver.
