= The Service Star =

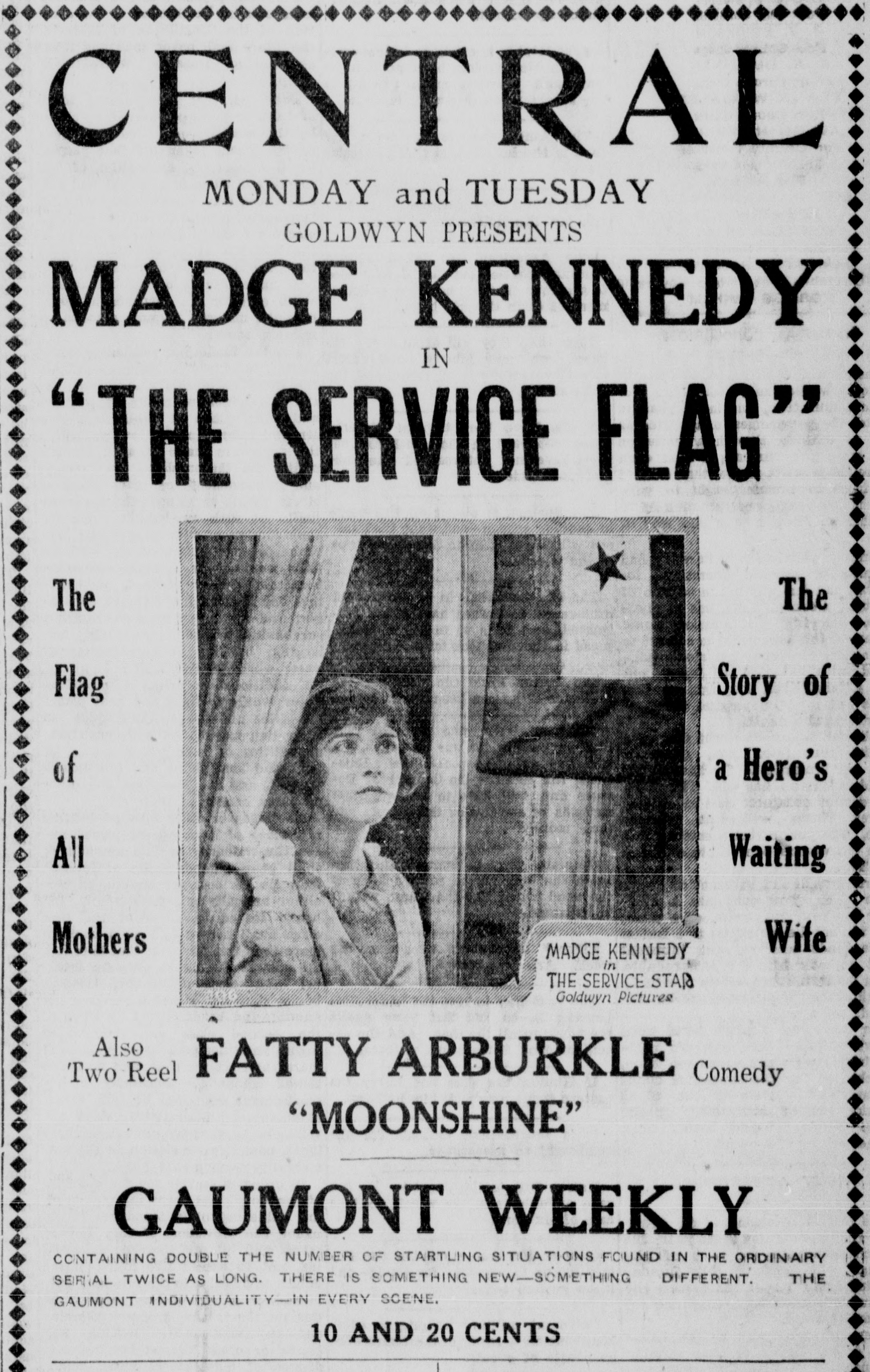
- Contemporary advertisement
- Directed by: Charles Miller
- Written by: Charles Logue (credited as Charles A. Logue) (scenario)
- Produced by: Samuel Goldwyn
- Starring: Madge Kennedy; Clarence Oliver; Maude Turner Gordon
- Cinematography: Louis Dunmyre; Ned Van Buren
- Production company: Goldwyn Pictures Corporation
- Distributed by: Goldwyn Pictures
- Release date: July 7, 1918
- Running time: 60 minutes; 6 reels
- Country: United States
- Language: Silent (English intertitles)

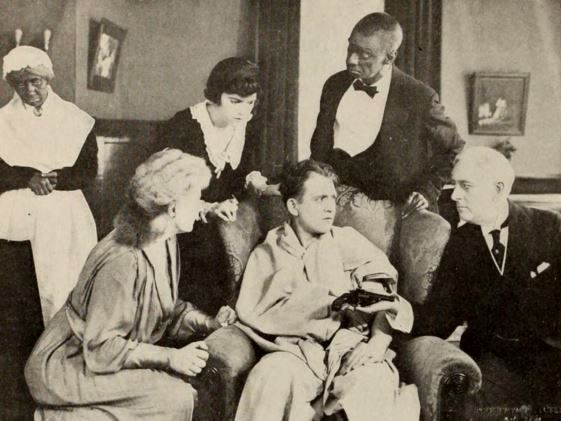
Scene from the film

The Service Star (aka The Flag of Mothers) is an American silent film directed by Charles Miller. The film stars Madge Kennedy as a young woman who pretends to be the fiancée of a famous flying ace during World War I. The film was copyrighted under the title The Flag of Mothers and was released in July 1918, four months before the end of the conflict.

== Plot ==
Marilyn March (Madge Kennedy), a plain young girl from the country, lonely and unhappy because she alone of all the girls in her town does not have a soldier sweetheart, When she moves to Washington, D.C. at the outbreak of World War I, she begins to pretend to be the fiancée of John Whitney Marshall (Clarence Oliver), a famous combat aviator, and places a service star in her window.

When Mrs. Marshall (Maude Turner Gordon) the flyer's mother, learns of the "engagement," she accepts the girl as her future daughter-in-law, just in time for complications to arise in the form of the truth. John is also harboring a secret; he is a chemist and is still in the United States working on a chemical weapon for the government. The combat flyer who is in France is an imposter he sent. Marilyn is torn over her affection for John and revealing to the Selective Service board that he is a fraud. Events transpire that turn John into a legitimate hero that Marilyn can accept as her true love.

== Cast ==
- Madge Kennedy as Marily March
- Clarence Oliver as John Whitney Marshall
- Maude Turner Gordon as Mrs. Marshall
- Mabel Ballin as Gwendolyn Plummer
- Victory Bateman as Aunt Judith
- Tammany Young as Blinky
- William Bechtel as Finkelstein
- Jules Cowles as Jefferson
- Zula Ellsworth as Martha
- John A. Hemmingway as Civil War Veteran
- Phineas Billings as Civil War Veteran
- Isaac Wentworth as Civil War Veteran
- David Schuyler as Civil War Veteran

== Production ==
According to publicity for The Service Star, some scenes were shot in Washington, D.C., as well as in various towns in northern New Jersey, and on Long Island, New York. While on location in Long Island, a parade of American Civil War veterans who gave a tribute to drafted boys leaving for boot camp was incorporated into the film.

== Reception ==
Like many American films of the time, The Service Star was subject to cuts by city and state film censorship boards. For example, in Reel 5, the Chicago Board of Censors cut the shooting of the chemist.

The Service Star is a lost film. During its original release, it was paired with a short Harold Lloyd comedy in some theaters.
