= Bringing Up Father (radio) =

1941 American radio sitcom

- Genre: Radio sitcom
- Running time: 30 minutes
- Country of origin: United States
- Language(s): English
- Syndicates: NBC Blue Network on NBC Radio.
- Starring: Mark Smith, Agnes Moorehead, Neil O'Malley, Helen Shields, Joan Banks, Craig McDonnell.
- Original release: July 1 – September 30, 1941
- Sponsored by: Lever Brothers

Bringing Up Father is an American radio situation comedy show based on the comic strip Bringing Up Father by George McManus. It aired from July 1 to September 30, 1941, each Tuesday at 9 p.m. on NBC Radio. Each episode was a half-hour long. The sponsor was Lever Brothers.

== Plot ==
Much like the comic strip each episode featured Jiggs' family in domestic hijinks, with Jiggs usually the victim of his wife's anger.

== Cast ==
- Jiggs: Mark Smith, Neil O'Malley.
- Maggie: Agnes Moorehead
- Nora: Helen Shields, Joan Banks
- Dinty Moore: Craig McDonnell

== Theme song ==
The music was composed by Merle Kendrick.

Jiggs, stand up and be a man,

Don't let Maggie get under your collar

Jiggs, be a man for once

And stand up and holler

Jiggs, it's time you make your stand

But it's sure not to make us quit singing of "Bringing Up Father"

== Audio example ==
Internet Archive: Bringing Up Father
Note: This audio example is actually from the 1931 version of the Bringing Up Father radio show, made under the supervision of the William Morris Agency. The 1931 transcription program of Bringing Up Father was originally broadcast by The Yankee Chain, which consisted of seven New England radio stations operated by the Shepherd Broadcasting Company.
