= Helen Shields =

American actress (died 1963)

- Born: British Honduras
- Died: August 7, 1963; Saint Clare's Hospital
- Occupation: Actor
- Spouse(s): John Boruff, William Alexander Kemp

Helen Shields (died August 7, 1963) was an American actress on radio, Broadway, and television.

Helen Shields was born in British Honduras to American parents. Her father, John Shields, was an executive with United Fruit Company.

Helen Shields had a long career on stage and on Broadway. Her early roles included parts in Washington Jitters (1930), The Devil Takes a Bride (1938), and Young Couple Wanted (1940). She appeared in Elia Kazan's 1940 revival of Liliom starring Burgess Meredith and Ingrid Bergman and was the understudy for Jessica Tandy and Uta Hagen in A Streetcar Named Desire for the 1948–49 season. She also appeared in Apple of His Eye, Angel Street, and The Silver Whistle.

In the 1940s she made frequent appearances in radio dramas, with regular roles in Amanda of Honeymoon Hill, Aunt Jenny's Real Life Stories, Bringing Up Father, By Kathleen Norris, I Love Linda Dale, and Young Widder Brown. In the 1950s and early 1960s, she had regular roles in the television soap operas Concerning Miss Marlowe (Margaret Marlowe and Dot Clayton), From These Roots (Emily Fraser Benson), As the World Turns (Edna Rice), and The Edge of Night (Hester Spode). Her television guest roles included appearances on The Aldrich Family (1953), Hollywood Screen Test (1953), Ethel and Albert (1958), and City Hospital (1952). She also had supporting roles in the films The Whistle at Eaton Falls (1951) and The Wrong Man (1956).

She had roles in several Broadway plays: Maxwell Anderson's Barefoot in Athens (1951) Molly Kazan's The Egghead (1957) and Seyril Schochen's The Moon Besieged (1962). Off-Broadway roles included The Apollo of Bellac (1957) and Virtuous Island (1957).

Helen Shields died on 7 August 1963 in St. Clare's Hospital.

== Personal life ==
Shields married John Boruff, actor and co-writer of Washington Jitters, in 1938. They divorced in 1950. In 1951, she married William Alexander Kemp.
