= Agnes Moorehead =

American actress (1900–1974)

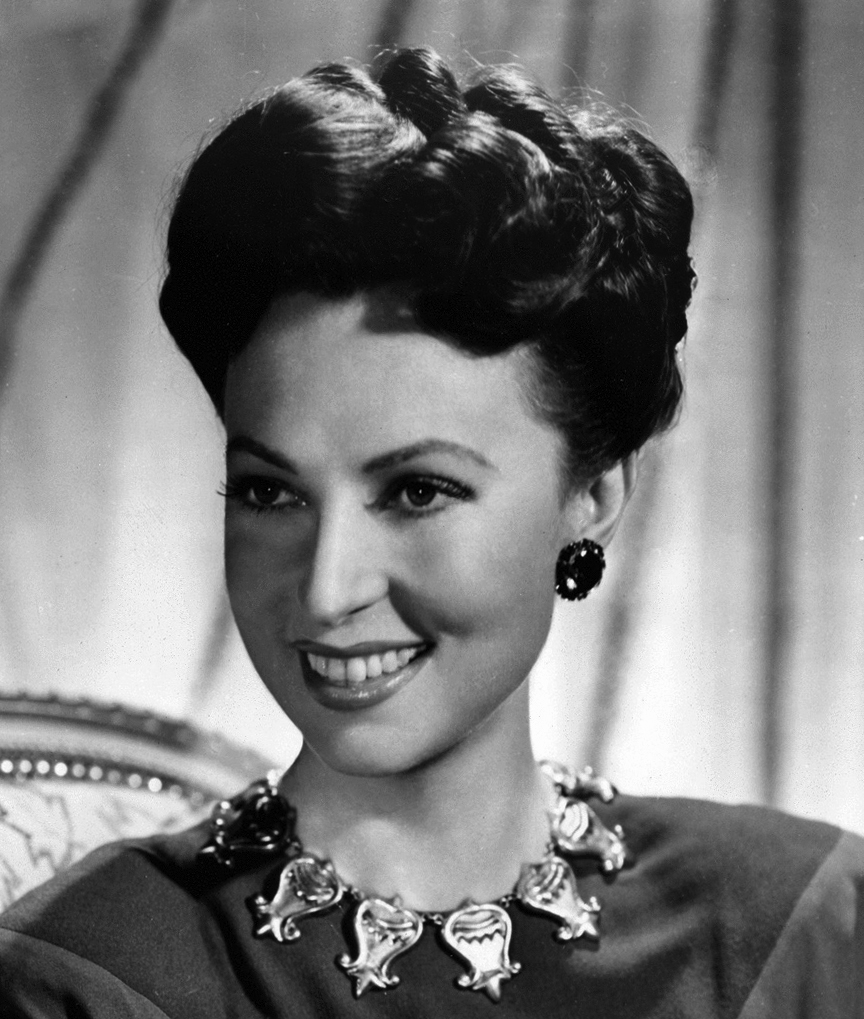
- Born: Agnes Robertson Moorehead; December 6, 1900; Clinton, Massachusetts, U.S.
- Died: April 30, 1974 (aged 73); Rochester, Minnesota, U.S.
- Resting place: Dayton Memorial Park, Dayton, Ohio, U.S.
- Occupation: Actress
- Years active: 1933–1974
- Spouses: John Griffith Lee (m. 1930; div. 1952) Robert Gist (m. 1954; div. 1958)

Agnes Robertson Moorehead (December 6, 1900 – April 30, 1974) was an American actress. In a career spanning five decades, her credits included work in radio, stage, film, and television. Moorehead was the recipient of such accolades as a Primetime Emmy Award and two Golden Globe Awards, in addition to nominations for four Academy Awards.

Moorehead joined Orson Welles's Mercury Players as one of his principal performers in 1937. She had notable roles in the films Citizen Kane (1941), Dark Passage (1947), Show Boat (1951), and All That Heaven Allows (1955). Moorehead received four nominations for the Academy Award for Best Supporting Actress, for her performances in The Magnificent Ambersons (1942), Mrs. Parkington (1944), Johnny Belinda (1948), and Hush...Hush, Sweet Charlotte (1964). She is also known for the radio play Sorry, Wrong Number (1943).

She gained acclaim for her role as Endora on the ABC sitcom Bewitched, which she played from 1964 to 1972. Her performance earned her six nominations for the Primetime Emmy Award for Outstanding Supporting Actress in a Comedy Series. For her role on the western series The Wild Wild West, she won the Primetime Emmy Award for Outstanding Supporting Actress in a Drama Series.

== Early life ==
Agnes Robertson Moorehead was born on December 6, 1900, in Clinton, Massachusetts, the daughter of former singer Mary (née McCauley), who was 17 when she gave birth to Agnes, and Presbyterian clergyman John Henderson Moorehead. Moorehead later claimed that she was born in 1906 to appear younger for acting parts. She recalled that she made her first public performance at the age of three, when she recited the Lord's Prayer in her father's church. The family moved to St. Louis, Missouri, and her ambition to become an actress grew "very strong". Her mother indulged her active imagination, often asking, "Who are you today, Agnes?" while Moorehead and her younger sister Peggy (born Margaret Ann) engaged in mimicry. This involved coming to the dinner table and imitating their father's parishioners; they were further encouraged by his amused reactions.

As a young woman, Moorehead joined the chorus of the St. Louis Municipal Opera Company, known as "The Muny". In addition to her interest in acting, she developed a lifelong interest in religion; in later years, actors such as Dick Sargent recalled Moorehead's arriving on the set with "the Bible in one hand and the script in the other".

Moorehead earned a bachelor's degree in biology in 1923 at Muskingum College in New Concord, Ohio. While there, she also appeared in college stage plays. She received an honorary doctorate in literature from Muskingum in 1947, and served for a year on its board of trustees. When her family moved to Reedsburg, Wisconsin, she taught public school for five years in Soldiers Grove, Wisconsin, while she also earned a master's degree in English and public speaking at the University of Wisconsin (now the University of Wisconsin-Madison). She then pursued postgraduate studies at the American Academy of Dramatic Arts, from which she graduated with honors in 1929. Moorehead also received an honorary doctoral degree from Bradley University in Peoria, Illinois.

== Career ==
Moorehead's early acting career was unsteady, and although she was able to find stage work, she was often unemployed. She later recalled going four days without food, and said that it had taught her "the value of a dollar". She found work in radio and was soon in demand, often working on several programs in a single day. She believed that it offered her excellent training and allowed her to develop her voice to create a variety of characterizations. Moorehead met the actress Helen Hayes, who encouraged her to enter films, but her first attempts were met with failure. When she was rejected as not being "the right type", Moorehead returned to radio.

=== Mercury Theatre ===
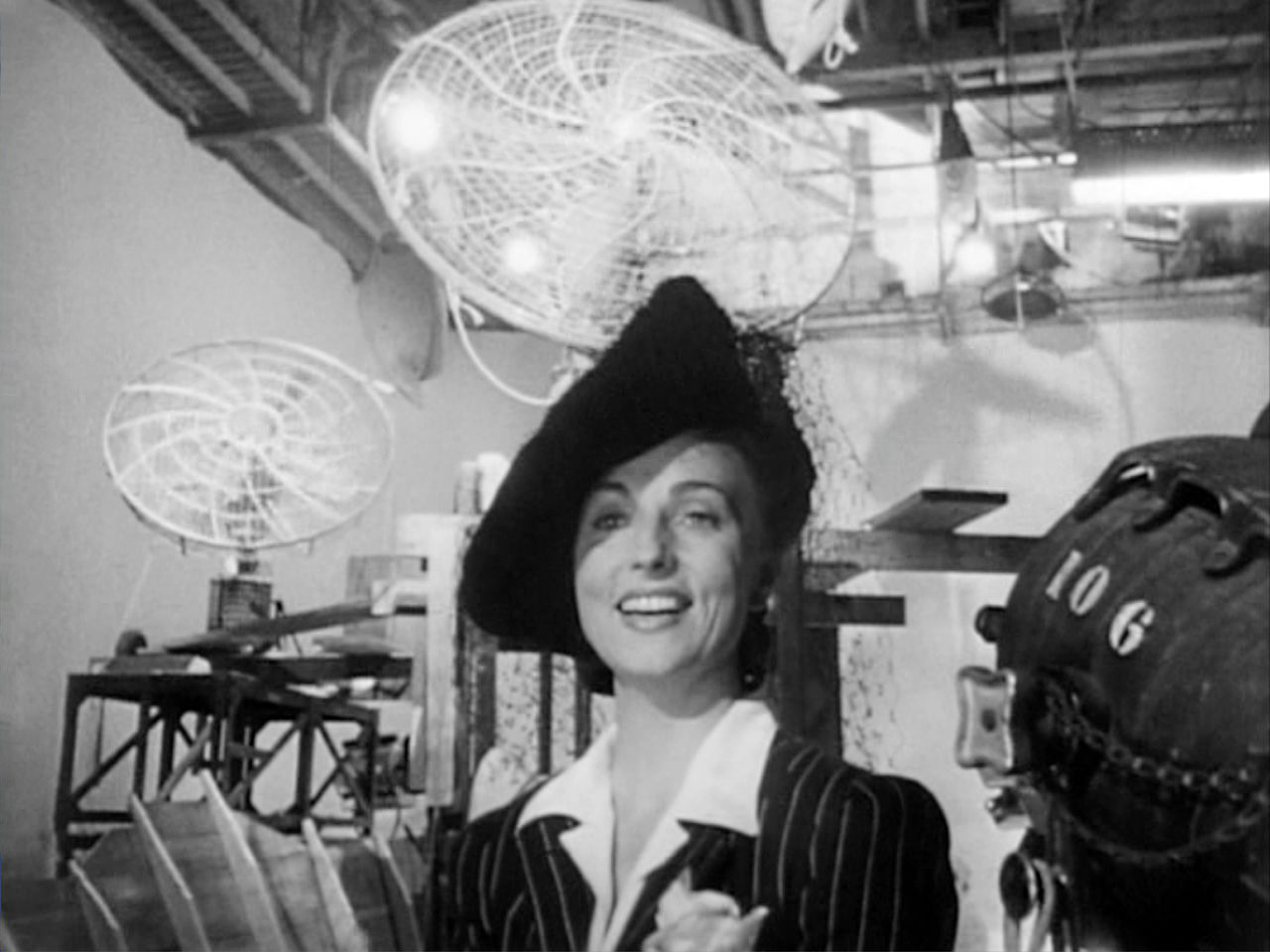
Moorehead in the Citizen Kane trailer (1940)

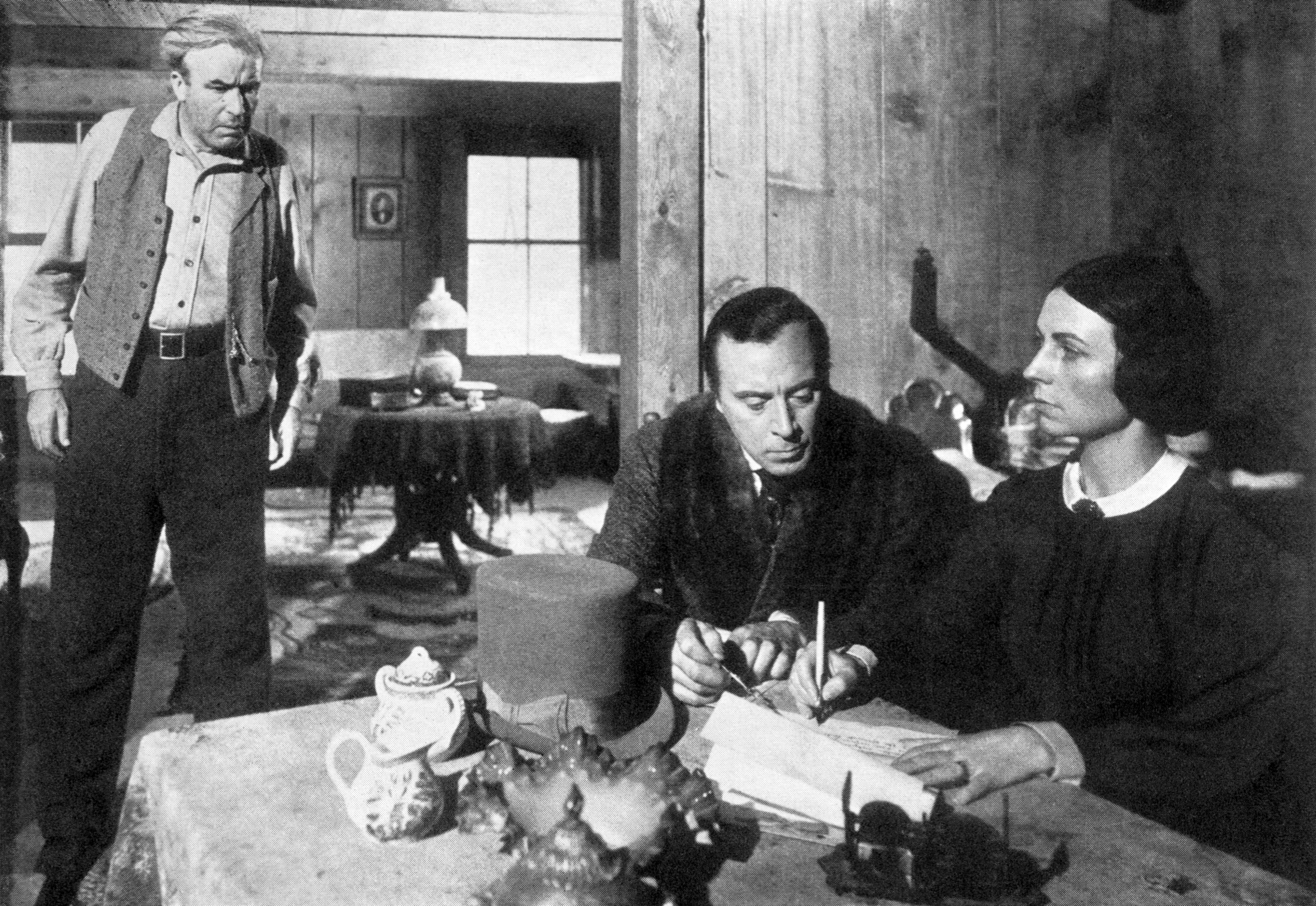
Harry Shannon, George Coulouris and Agnes Moorehead in Citizen Kane (1941)

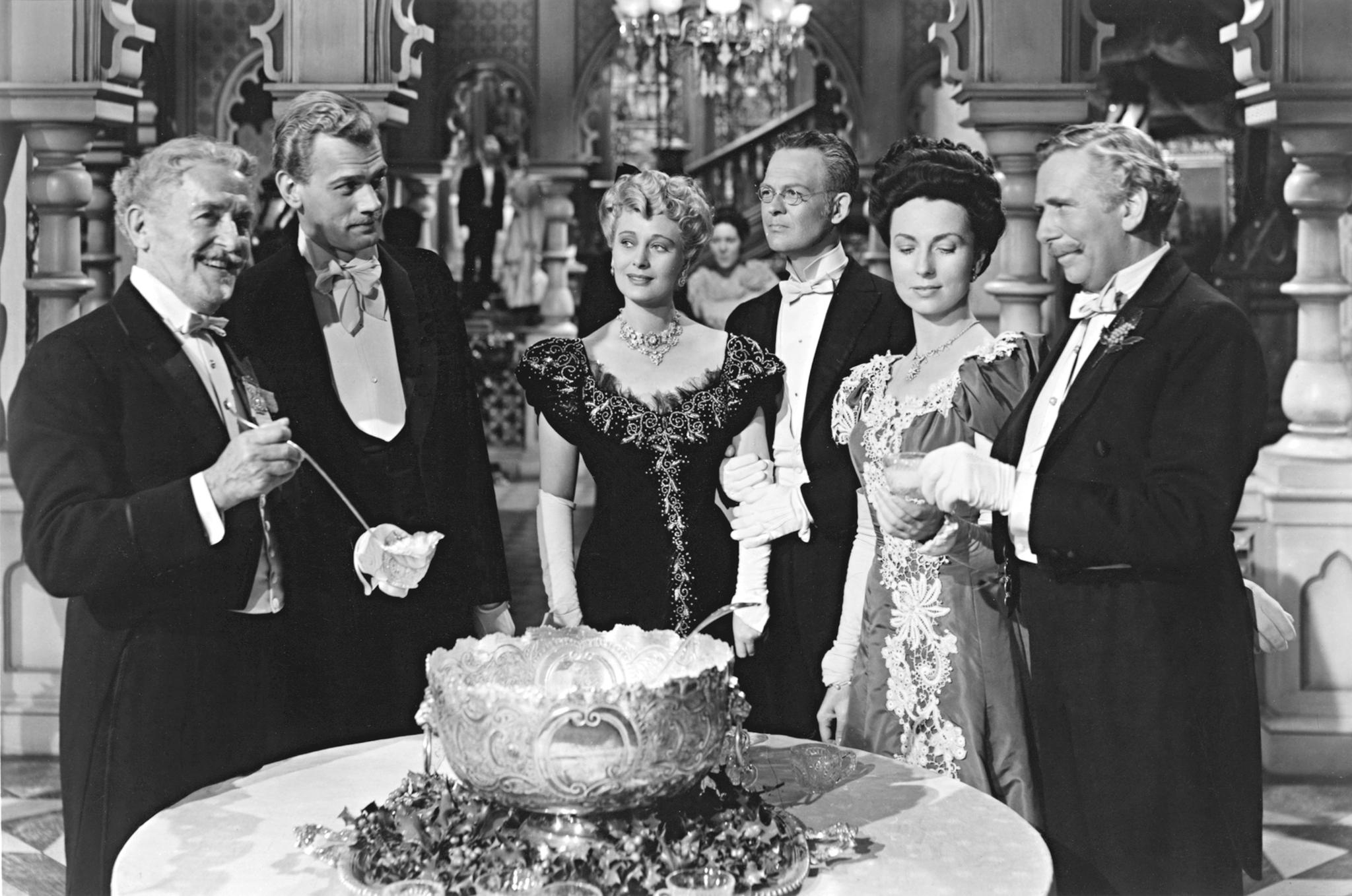
Richard Bennett, Joseph Cotten, Dolores Costello, Don Dillaway, Agnes Moorehead, and Ray Collins in The Magnificent Ambersons (1942)

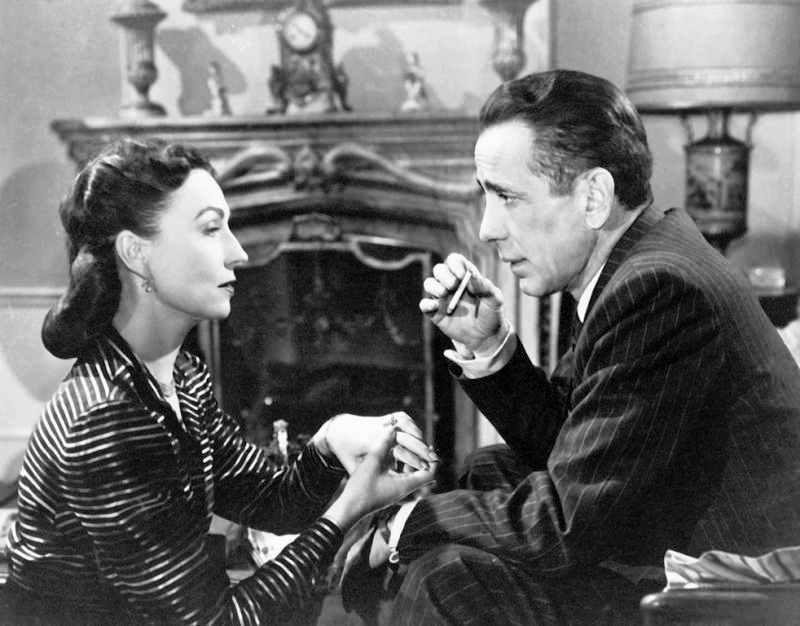
Moorehead and Humphrey Bogart in Dark Passage (1947)

By 1937, Moorehead joined Orson Welles' Mercury Players as one of his principal performers along with Joseph Cotten. (In an appearance on The Dick Cavett Show on February 19, 1973, she revealed that, in 1922, she had by chance met Welles (15 years her junior) when he was a mere seven years old at the Waldorf-Astoria Hotel in New York City.) She performed in his The Mercury Theatre on the Air radio adaptations, and had a regular role opposite Welles in the serial The Shadow as Margo Lane. In 1939, Welles moved the Mercury Theatre to Hollywood, where he started working for RKO Pictures. Several of his radio performers joined him, and Moorehead made her film debut as the mother of his own character, Charles Foster Kane, in Citizen Kane (1941). Moorehead was featured in Welles' second film, The Magnificent Ambersons (1942), and received the New York Film Critics Award and an Academy Award nomination for her performance. She also appeared in Journey Into Fear (1943), a Mercury film production.

Moorehead received positive reviews for her performance in Mrs. Parkington (1944), and the Golden Globe Award for Best Supporting Actress and an Academy Award nomination. Moorehead played another strong role in The Big Street (1942) with Henry Fonda and Lucille Ball, and then appeared in two films that failed to find an audience, Government Girl (1943) with Olivia de Havilland and The Youngest Profession (1944) with an adolescent Virginia Weidler.

=== Metro-Goldwyn-Mayer ===
By the mid-1940s, Moorehead had become a Metro-Goldwyn-Mayer contract player, negotiating a $6,000-a-week contract, which also allowed her to perform on radio, an unusual clause at the time. Moorehead explained that MGM usually refused to allow its actors to appear on radio, as "the actors didn't have the knowledge or the taste or the judgment to appear on the right sort of show." In 1943–1944, Moorehead portrayed "matronly housekeeper Mrs. Mullet", who was constantly offering her "candied opinion", in the Mutual Broadcasting System's The Adventures of Leonidas Witherall; she inaugurated the role on CBS Radio.

Throughout her career, Moorehead often portrayed puritanical matrons, neurotic spinsters, possessive mothers, and comical secretaries. She had supporting roles in The Youngest Profession (1943), Since You Went Away (1944), and the crime drama Dark Passage (1947), starring Humphrey Bogart and Lauren Bacall. She then played Aggie McDonald in the 1948 film, Johnny Belinda. She played against type and received critical praise for her role in Our Vines Have Tender Grapes (1945), co-starring with Edward G. Robinson and Margaret O'Brien as Bruna Jacobson, the wise, warm-hearted farm wife and mother. She played Parthy Hawks, wife of Cap'n Andy and mother of Magnolia, in MGM's hit 1951 remake of Show Boat. Moorehead was in Broadway productions of Don Juan in Hell in 1951–1952, and Lord Pengo in 1962–1963.

=== Radio ===
In her first radio role, Moorehead appeared as a replacement for Dorothy Denvir's role as Min Gump in The Gumps. During the 1940s and 1950s, Moorehead was one of the most in-demand actresses for radio dramas, especially on the CBS show Suspense. During the 946-episode run of Suspense, Moorehead was cast in more episodes than any other actor or actress. She was often introduced on the show as the "first lady of Suspense". Moorehead's most successful appearance on Suspense was in the play Sorry, Wrong Number, written by Lucille Fletcher, broadcast on May 18, 1943. Moorehead played a selfish, neurotic woman who overhears a murder being plotted via crossed phone wires and eventually realizes she is the intended victim. She recreated the performance six times for Suspense and several times on other radio shows, always using her original, dog-eared script. The May 25, 1943 airing was made part of the National Sound Registry by the Library of Congress in 2014. In 1952, she recorded an album of the drama and performed scenes from the story in her one-woman show in the 1950s. Barbara Stanwyck played the role in the 1948 film version.

In 1941, Moorehead played Maggie in the short-lived Bringing Up Father program on the Blue Network. From 1942 to 1949, Moorehead played the role of the mayor's housekeeper in the radio version of Mayor of the Town. She also starred in The Amazing Mrs. Danberry, a situation comedy on CBS in 1946. Moorehead's title character was described as "the lively widow of a department store owner who has a tongue as sharp as a hatpin and a heart as warm as summer." Moorehead played one of her last roles on January 6, 1974, as Mrs. Ada Canby in the ironically titled "The Old Ones Are Hard to Kill", the inaugural episode of CBS Radio Mystery Theater.

=== Films and stage appearances of the 1950s–1960s ===
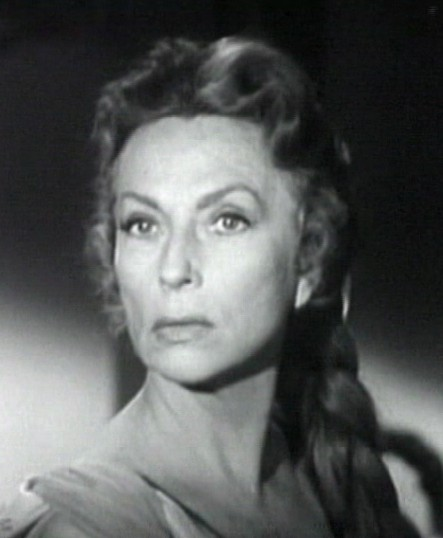
Moorehead in The Bat (1959)

In the 1950s, Moorehead continued to work in films and appeared on stage across the country. Her stage roles included a national tour of Shaw's Don Juan in Hell, co-starring Charles Boyer, Charles Laughton, and Cedric Hardwicke, and the pre-Broadway engagements of the new musical The Pink Jungle. She had a supporting role in the big-budget Howard Hughes film The Conqueror (1956), starring John Wayne and Susan Hayward, a film she later regretted appearing in. She starred in The Bat (1959) with Vincent Price. She appeared as the hypochondriac Mrs. Snow in Disney's hit film Pollyanna (1960). She starred with Bette Davis, Olivia de Havilland, Mary Astor, and Joseph Cotten in Hush...Hush, Sweet Charlotte (1964) as the maid Velma, a role for which she was nominated for a Best Supporting Actress Academy Award.

=== Television ===
In 1959, Moorehead guest-starred on many series, including The Rebel and Alcoa Theatre. Her role in the radio play Sorry, Wrong Number inspired writers of the CBS television series The Twilight Zone to script an episode with Moorehead in mind. In "The Invaders" (broadcast January 27, 1961), Moorehead played a woman whose isolated farm is plagued by mysterious intruders. Moorehead found the script odd because it had only one line of dialogue, at the very end. Her character gasped in terror once or twice, but never spoke. In Sorry, Wrong Number, Moorehead offered a famed, bravura performance using only her voice.

Moorehead also had guest roles on Channing, Custer, Rawhide in "Incident at Poco Tiempo" as Sister Frances, and The Rifleman. On February 10, 1967, she portrayed Miss Emma Valentine in "The Night of the Vicious Valentine" on The Wild Wild West, a performance for which she won a Primetime Emmy Award for Outstanding Supporting Actress in a Drama Series.

=== Bewitched ===
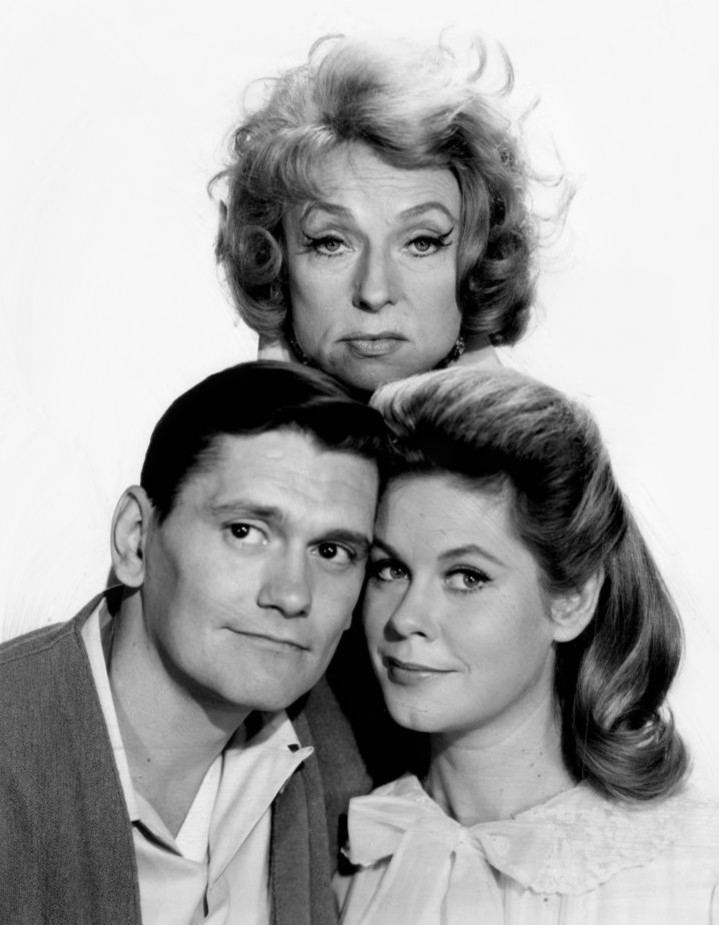
Moorehead with Bewitched castmates Dick York and Elizabeth Montgomery

In 1964, Moorehead accepted the role of Endora, Samantha's (Elizabeth Montgomery) mortal-loathing, quick-witted witch mother in the situation comedy Bewitched. She later commented that she had not expected it to succeed and that she ultimately felt trapped by its success, but she had negotiated to appear in only eight of every 12 episodes made, thus allowing her sufficient time to pursue other projects. She also felt that the television writing was often below standard and dismissed many of the Bewitched scripts as "hack" in a 1965 interview for TV Guide. The role brought her a level of recognition that she had not received before, as Bewitched was in the top-10 programs for the first few years it aired.

Moorehead received six Emmy Award nominations for her work on the series, but was quick to remind interviewers that she had enjoyed a long and distinguished career, commenting to the New York Daily News in 1965, "I've been in movies and played theatre from coast to coast, so I was quite well known before 'Bewitched,' and I don't particularly want to be identified as the witch." Despite her ambivalence, she remained with Bewitched until its run ended in 1972. Prior to her death in 1974, she said she had enjoyed playing the role enough, but it was not challenging, and the show itself was "not breathtaking", although her flamboyant and colorful character appealed to children. She expressed a fondness for the show's star, Elizabeth Montgomery, and said she had enjoyed working with her. Co-star Dick Sargent, who in 1969 replaced the ill Dick York as Samantha's husband Darrin Stephens, had a more difficult relationship with Moorehead, describing her as "a tough old bird."

In fall 1964, Moorehead participated in a 5-minute commercial spot featuring casts of both Bonanza and Bewitched, announcing the new 1965 Chevrolet line. Moorehead was featured with Dan Blocker extolling the virtues of the new '65 Chevy II.

=== Later years ===
In the 1970s, Moorehead's life was increasingly affected by declining health. In 1970, she appeared as a dying woman who haunts her own house in the early Night Gallery episode "Certain Shadows on the Wall". She co-starred with Shelley Winters and Debbie Reynolds in the horror film What's the Matter with Helen? (1971) and had the lead role in the low-budget ax murderer film Dear Dead Delilah (1972) with Will Geer, her last starring role. She also reprised her role in Don Juan in Hell on Broadway and on tour, with an all-star cast that featured Edward Mulhare, Ricardo Montalbán, and Paul Henreid.

Moorehead supplied the voice of the friendly "Goose" in Hanna-Barbera's 1973 adaptation of E. B. White's children's book Charlotte's Web.

For the 1973 Broadway adaptation of Gigi, Moorehead portrayed Aunt Alicia and performed various songs, including "The Contract" for the original cast recording. She fell ill during the production, resulting in Arlene Francis having to replace her. Moorehead died shortly afterward.

In January 1974, three months before her death, two episodes featuring Moorehead (including the series' premiere episode) aired on the CBS Radio Mystery Theater, the popular radio show produced and directed by Himan Brown.

== Personal life ==
=== Marriages ===
In 1930, Moorehead married actor John Griffith Lee. They divorced in 1952, a year after fostering a boy named Sean Lee. She married actor Robert Gist in 1954, and they divorced in 1958.

=== Sexuality ===
Moorehead's sexuality has been the subject of much speculation and dispute. A number of articles that appeared in periodicals in the alternative press have identified her as a lesbian. Paul Lynde, Moorehead's co-star on Bewitched, stated: "Well, the whole world knows Agnes was a lesbian - I mean classy as hell, but one of the all-time Hollywood dykes". Journalist Boze Hadleigh reported an incident, also sourced to Lynde, in which, when she caught one of her husbands cheating on her, "Agnes screamed at him that if he could have a mistress, so could she." In a 1973 interview with Hadleigh, when afforded the opportunity to either confirm or, once and for all, put to rest the rumors regarding her sexual orientation, Moorehead "wryly" opts to do neither:

BH: Just one more question. Numerous Hollywood actresses - Garbo, Gish, Dietrich, Jean Arthur, um, Kay Francis, Stanwyck, Bankhead, Del Rio, Janet Gaynor, etc., etc. - have enjoyed lesbian or bi relationships. Have you ever...?
AM: Yes, you'd love to put me in their excellent company! Even if I don't belong in the same category. [Smiles wryly]
BH: You don't?
AM: Those ladies were more beautiful than me.

Moorehead's close friend Debbie Reynolds stated categorically that Moorehead was not a lesbian. Reynolds's autobiography mentions the rumor and states it was started "maliciously" by one of Moorehead's husbands during their divorce. Moorehead's longtime friend and producer Paul Gregory concurs in that assessment. Quint Benedetti, Moorehead's longtime employee who was gay, also stated that Moorehead was not a lesbian and attributed the story to Paul Lynde's frequent gossiping and rumor-mongering.

=== Politics ===
Moorehead rarely spoke publicly about her political beliefs, but she supported both Franklin Delano Roosevelt (she portrayed Eleanor Roosevelt multiple times over the course of her career) and close friend Ronald Reagan for his 1966 run for governor of California.

== Death ==
Moorehead was one of many people to have developed cancer after exposure to radioactive fallout from atmospheric atomic bomb tests while making The Conqueror (1956) with John Wayne in Iron City, Utah. Several production members, as well as Wayne himself, Susan Hayward, Pedro Armendáriz (who died by suicide while suffering from cancer), and the film's director Dick Powell, later died from cancer and cancer-related illnesses. The cast and crew totalled 220 people. By the end of 1980, as ascertained by People, 91 of them had developed some form of cancer, and 46 had died of the disease.

Moorehead died at Mayo Clinic Hospital in Rochester, Minnesota, on April 30, 1974, due to uterine cancer at the age of 73.

Moorehead is entombed in a crypt at Dayton Memorial Park in Dayton, Ohio. In 1994, she was posthumously inducted into the St. Louis Walk of Fame.

Moorehead bequeathed $25,000 to Muskingum College, with instructions to fund one or more "Agnes Moorehead Scholarships". She also left half of her manuscripts to Muskingum—a Presbyterian school founded by her uncle—with the other half going to the University of Wisconsin. Her family's Ohio farm went to Bob Jones University in Greenville, South Carolina, along with her collection of Bibles and biblical scholarship materials. Moorehead's father was a Presbyterian minister, and in 1921, when Agnes was an undergraduate at Muskingum, the college presented an honorary degree to Bob Jones, Sr.

Moorehead's mother, Mary, received all of Moorehead's clothing and jewelry, and Moorehead made provisions to support Mary for the rest of her life. The Beverly Hills home was left to Moorehead's attorney, Franklin Rohner, along with the furnishings and personal property within. Small bequests were made for friends and domestic staff, along with some charitable contributions. In her will, she made no provision for her foster son Sean Lee. In fact, she had fostered Sean only until his 18th birthday, and her will stated that she had "no children, natural or adopted, living or deceased".

== Acting credits ==
=== Filmography ===
Film
Year	Title	Role	Notes
1941	Citizen Kane	Mary Kane	
1942	The Magnificent Ambersons	Fanny Minafer	New York Film Critics Circle Award for Best Actress
1942	The Big Street	Violette Shumberg	
1943	Journey into Fear	Mrs. Mathews	
1943	The Youngest Profession	Miss Featherstone	
1943	Government Girl	Adele – Mrs. Delancey Wright	
1943	Jane Eyre	Mrs. Reed	
1944	Since You Went Away	Mrs. Emily Hawkins	
1944	Dragon Seed	Third Cousin's Wife	
1944	The Seventh Cross	Madame Marelli	
1944	Mrs. Parkington	Baroness Aspasia Conti	
1944	Tomorrow, the World	Aunt Jesse Frame	
1945	Keep Your Powder Dry	Lieut. Colonel Spottiswoode	
1945	Our Vines Have Tender Grapes	Bruna Jacobson	
1945	Her Highness and the Bellboy	Countess Zoe	
1947	Dark Passage	Madge Rapf	
1947	The Lost Moment	Juliana Borderau	
1948	Summer Holiday	Cousin Lily	
1948	The Woman in White	Countess Fosco	
1948	Station West	Mrs. Caslon	
1948	Johnny Belinda	Aggie MacDonald	
1949	The Stratton Story	Ma Stratton	
1949	The Great Sinner	Emma Getzel	
1949	Without Honor	Katherine Williams	
1950	Caged	Ruth Benton	
1950	Captain Blackjack	Mrs. Emily Birk	
1951	Fourteen Hours	Christine Hill Cosick	
1951	Adventures of Captain Fabian	Aunt Jezebel	
1951	Show Boat	Parthy Hawks	
1951	The Blue Veil	Mrs. Palfrey	
1952	The Blazing Forest	Jessie Crain	
1953	The Story of Three Loves	Aunt Lydia	Segment: "The Jealous Lover"
1953	Scandal at Scourie	Sister Josephine	
1953	Main Street to Broadway	Mildred Waterbury	
1953	Those Redheads From Seattle	Mrs. Edmonds	
1954	Magnificent Obsession	Nancy Ashford	
1955	Untamed	Aggie	
1955	The Left Hand of God	Beryl Sigman	
1955	All That Heaven Allows	Sara Warren	
1956	The Conqueror	Hunlun	
1956	Meet Me in Las Vegas	Miss Hattie	
1956	The Swan	Queen Maria Dominika	
1956	The Revolt of Mamie Stover	Bertha Parchman	
1956	Pardners	Mrs. Matilda Kingsley	
1956	The Opposite Sex	Countess de Brion	
1957	The True Story of Jesse James	Mrs. Samuel	
1957	Jeanne Eagels	Nellie Neilson	
1957	Raintree County	Ellen Shawnessy	
1957	The Story of Mankind	Queen Elizabeth I	
1958	The Tempest	Vassilissa Mironova	
1959	Night of the Quarter Moon	Cornelia Nelson	
1959	The Bat	Cornelia van Gorder	
1960	Pollyanna	Mrs. Snow	
1961	Twenty Plus Two	Mrs. Eleanor Delaney	
1961	Bachelor in Paradise	Judge Peterson	
1962	Jessica	Maria Lombardo	
1962	How the West Was Won	Rebecca Prescott	
1963	Who's Minding the Store?	Mrs. Phoebe Tuttle	
1964	Hush...Hush, Sweet Charlotte	Velma Cruther	
1966	The Singing Nun	Sister Cluny	
1969	The Ballad of Andy Crocker	Lisa's Mother	ABC Movie of the Week
1971	What's the Matter with Helen?	Sister Alma	
1972	Dear Dead Delilah	Delilah Charles	
1973	Charlotte's Web	The Goose	Voice
2005	Bewitched	Endora	Uncredited; archive footage

=== Television ===
Year	Title	Role	Notes
1953	The Revlon Mirror Theater	Martha Adams	Episode: "Lullaby"
1955	The Colgate Comedy Hour	Aunt Minnie	Episode: "Roberta"
1956	Matinee Theatre	Mrs. Barnes	Episode: "Greybeards and Witches"
1956	Studio 57	Mrs. Tolliver	Episode: "Teacher"
1957	Climax!	Irene	Episode: "Locked in Fear"
1957	Wagon Train	Mary Halstead	Episode: "The Mary Halstead Story"
1958	The DuPont Show of the Month	Madame Defarge	Episode: "A Tale of Two Cities"
1958	Playhouse 90	Rose Ganun	Episode: "The Dungeon"
1958	Suspicion	Katherine Searles	Episode: "The Protege"
1959	General Electric Theatre	Ana Konrad Bethlen	Episode: "Deed of Mercy"
1959	Alcoa Theatre	Mrs. Adams	Episode: "Man of His House"
1959	The Rebel	Mrs. Martha Lassiter	Episode: "In Memoriam"
1960	Startime	Carmen Lynch	Episode: "Closed Set"
1960	The Millionaire	Katherine Boland	Episode: "Millionaire Katherine Boland"
1960	The Chevy Mystery Show	Elizabeth Marshall	Episode: "Trial by Fury"
1960	Adventures in Paradise	Jikiri	Episode: "The Krismen"
1960	Rawhide	Sister Frances	S3:E8, "Incident at Poco Tiempo"
1960	Shirley Temple's Storybook	Hepzibah Pyncheon; Mombi the Witch; Witch in Rapunzel	3 episodes
1960	The Rifleman	Alberta 'Bertie' Hoakam	Episode: "Miss Bertie" season 3, episode 14
1961	The Twilight Zone	Woman	Episode: "The Invaders"
1961	My Sister Eileen	Aunt Harriet	2 episodes
1962	Poor Mr. Campbell	Adrice Campbell	
1963–1965	Burke's Law	Pauline Moss; Dona Ynez Ortega y Esteban; Liz Haggerty	2 episodes
1964	Channing	Professor Amelia Webster	Episode: "Freedom Is a Lovesome Thing God Wot"
1964	The Greatest Show on Earth	Millie	Episode: "This Train Don't Stop Till It Gets There"
1964–1972	Bewitched	Endora	146 episodes; Main role
1966	The Lone Ranger	Black Widow	Episode: "The Trickster/Crack of Doom/The Human Dynamo"
1966	Password	Herself	Game Show Contestant / Celebrity Guest Star
1967	The Wild Wild West	Emma Valentine	Episode: "The Night of the Vicious Valentine"
1967	Custer	Watoma	Episode: "Spirit Woman"
1969	Lancer	Mrs. Normile	Episode: "A Person Unknown"
1969	The Red Skelton Show	Bertha Bluenose	Episode: "He Wanted to Be a Square Shooter But He Found That his Barrel was Round"
1970	Barefoot in the Park	Mrs. Wilson	Episode: "Pilot"
1970	The Virginian	Emma Garvey	Episode: "Gun Quest"
1971	Night Gallery	Emma Brigham	2 episodes
1971	Walt Disney's Wonderful World of Color	Mrs. Pringle	Episode: "The Strange Monster of Strawberry Cove"
1971	Love, American Style	Mrs. Cooper	Segment: "Love and the Particular Girl"
1971	Marriage: Year One	Grandma Duden	Television movie
1971	Suddenly Single	Marlene	Television movie
1971	The Strange Monster of Strawberry Cove	Mrs. Pringle	Television movie
1972	Marcus Welby, M.D.	Mrs. Ramsey	Episode: "He Could Sell Iceboxes to Eskimos"
1972	Rolling Man	Grandmother	Television movie
1972	Night of Terror	Bronsky	Television movie
1973	Frankenstein: The True Story	Mrs. Blair	Television movie
1974	Rex Harrison Presents Stories of Love	Hercules's Wife	Television movie

=== Theater ===
Moorehead began appearing on stage during her training at the American Academy of Dramatic Arts. She appeared in seven productions as a student. She continued acting in the theater throughout her career until just a few months before her death.

Year	Play	Role
1928	Courage	Understudy
1929	Soldiers and Women	Understudy
1929	Scarlet Pages	Company
1929	Candle Light	Company
1934	All the King's Horses	Company
1951	Don Juan In Hell	Doña Ana. (Note: Moorehead originated the role in a national tour which culminated in a sold-out appearance at Carnegie Hall. Moorehead engaged in six tours of the production between 1951 and 1954 and appeared in a 1973 revival at the Palace Theatre.)
1954	An Evening with Agnes Moorehead	Herself (Note: Moorehead toured nationally in this one-woman show on and off for over 20 years. It became best known under the name The Fabulous Redhead and in the mid-1960s as Come Closer, I'll Give You an Earful.)
1957	The Rivalry	Mrs. Stephen A. Douglas. Moorehead toured with the play but dropped out before its New York debut.
1959	The Pink Jungle	Eleanor West
1962	Prescription: Murder	Claire Fleming
1962	Lord Prego	Miss Swanson
1963	High Spirits	Madame Arcati
1973	Gigi	Aunt Alicia

=== Radio ===
Moorehead appeared on hundreds of individual broadcasts across a radio career that spanned from 1926 to her final two appearances, on CBS Radio Mystery Theater in 1974.

Year	Program	Role
1929–1930	Believe It or Not	Ensemble
1930–1933	Sherlock Holmes	Ensemble
1931	The Ben Bernie Show	Ensemble
1932–1933	Mysteries In Paris	Nana
1933–1934	Evenings In Paris	Anna
1933–1936	The Armour Hour	Ensemble
1934	The Gumps	Min
1934–1935	Heartthrobs of the Hills	Ensemble
1935–1937	Dot and Will	Rose
1935–1936	The New Penny	
1936	Way Down East	
1936–1938	The March of Time	Ensemble / Eleanor Roosevelt.
1937	Terry and the Pirates	The Dragon Lady
1937–1939	The Shadow	Margo Lane
1938	The Mercury Theatre on the Air	Ensemble
1938	The Campbell Playhouse	Ensemble
1938–1941	Cavalcade of America	Ensemble
1939–1940	Brenda Curtis	Brenda's mother
1939–1940	The Aldrich Family	Mrs. Brown
1940	The Adventures of Superman	Lara
1941–1942	Bringing Up Father	Maggie
1941–1942	Bulldog Drummond	Ensemble
1942–1949	Mayor of the Town	Marilly
1942–1960	Suspense	Mrs. Elbert Stevenson (Note: Moorehead's appearances on Suspense were so numerous that she became known as "The First Lady of Suspense". Her most noted role was as Mrs. Elbert Stevenson in "Sorry, Wrong Number". She first performed the role on May 25, 1943, and reprised it on eight occasions through her last appearance on the program in 1960.)
1974	CBS Radio Mystery Theater	Ada Canby, Lorna Kitteridge

== Awards and nominations ==
Year	Awards	Category	Nominated work	Result
1942	Academy Awards	Best Supporting Actress	The Magnificent Ambersons	Nominated
1942	New York Film Critics Circle	Best Actress	The Magnificent Ambersons	Won
1944	Academy Awards	Best Supporting Actress	Mrs. Parkington	Nominated
1944	Golden Globe Awards	Golden Globe Award for Best Supporting Actress – Motion Picture	Mrs. Parkington	Won
1948	Academy Awards	Best Supporting Actress	Johnny Belinda	Nominated
1964	Academy Awards	Best Supporting Actress	Hush...Hush, Sweet Charlotte	Nominated
1964	Golden Globe Awards	Best Supporting Actress	Hush...Hush, Sweet Charlotte	Won
1966	Primetime Emmy Awards	Outstanding Supporting Actress in a Comedy Series	Bewitched	Nominated
1967	Primetime Emmy Awards	Outstanding Lead Actress in a Comedy Series	Bewitched	Nominated
1968	Primetime Emmy Awards	Outstanding Supporting Actress in a Comedy Series	Bewitched	Nominated
1969	Primetime Emmy Awards	Outstanding Supporting Actress in a Comedy Series	Bewitched	Nominated
1970	Primetime Emmy Awards	Outstanding Supporting Actress in a Comedy Series	Bewitched	Nominated
1971	Primetime Emmy Awards	Outstanding Supporting Actress in a Comedy Series	Bewitched	Nominated
1967	Primetime Emmy Awards	Outstanding Supporting Actress in a Drama Series	The Wild Wild West	Won
