= Herb Shriner =

American humorist and television host (1918–1970)

- Shriner in 1953
- Born: Herbert Arthur Schriner; May 29, 1918; Toledo, Ohio, U.S.
- Died: April 23, 1970 (aged 51); Delray Beach, Florida, U.S.
- Occupations: Humorist, radio personality, actor, television host
- Spouse: Eileen McDermott (1949–1970; their deaths)
- Children: 3; Including Wil and Kin

Herbert Arthur "Herb" Shriner (May 29, 1918 – April 23, 1970) was an American humorist, radio personality, actor, and television host. Shriner was known for his homespun monologues, usually about his home state of Indiana. He was frequently compared to humorist Will Rogers.

== Early life ==
Shriner was born Herbert Arthur Schriner in Toledo, Ohio, the son of Edith (née Rockwell) and Peter Schriner.

He moved to Fort Wayne as a small child, when his mother left his father. Shriner learned to play the harmonica as a grade school student. He formed a quintet when he was in high school; it expanded to an octet and made frequent local appearances. Shriner then performed on his own. When his lip gave out one night, he filled time by telling homespun stories. His deadpan comedy routines became more popular than his music, and soon he was entertaining audiences with stories about a fictional Hoosier hometown.

== Career ==
=== Radio ===
In 1940, Shriner was hired by NBC for occasional radio appearances, which led to a regular spot in 1942 and 1943 on the comedy-variety program Camel Caravan. During World War II, he served in a United States Army special services unit and performed for two years in USO shows for GIs in Europe. After the war, he appeared on a number of radio shows, including The Philip Morris Follies of 1946 with Johnny Desmond and Margaret Whiting.

In 1947 he appeared in a Broadway musical revue called Inside U.S.A. The performances were panned by critics, but Shriner's monologues made it a success and carried the show for over a year. Shriner hosted Herb Shriner Time, a CBS Radio weekday program, in 1948 and 1949 with the Raymond Scott Quintet, singer Dorothy Collins, and announcer Durward Kirby. The program was initially titled Alka-Seltzer Time (not to be confused with the later Alka-Seltzer Time that starred Curt Massey and Martha Tilton). In August 1949, Shriner decided not to continue the program because it was too much work. The previously mentioned Alka-Seltzer Time, with Massey and Tilton, which had been a summer replacement, continued in Shriner's place on CBS.

=== Television ===
Shriner had a five-minute comedy monologue on CBS that debuted on November 7, 1949. Philip Morris cigarettes sponsored the show, which ran from 7:55 to 8 p.m. Eastern Time. The show ended in 1950 when Philip Morris "decided that five-minute TV shows do not adequately advertise the product." Herb Shriner Time evolved into a short-lived, fifteen-minute television show. A half-hour version on ABC ran during the 1951–52 season. Shriner found TV success with Two for the Money, a game show which appeared on NBC in the 1952–53 season, then moved to CBS for three seasons. It was more of a showcase for Shriner's humor than a game show, much like You Bet Your Life, which starred Groucho Marx. Two for the Money gave Shriner an opportunity to deliver short monologues and harmonica solos. Reruns are occasionally shown even now on GSN. Seventeen-year-old Woody Allen wrote jokes for Shriner's shows.

=== Film ===
Shriner's only film role was portraying hardware store owner Frank Johnson in Main Street to Broadway (1953).

=== Records ===
In 1955, Shriner launched the Herb Shriner Harmonica Orchestra with Dominic (Don Henry) Quagenti, Cham-Ber Huang, Charles Leighton, Frank (Moose) Mitkowski, Victor Pankowitz, Alan Pogson and Alan (Blackie) Schackner. They recorded "Tumbling Tumbleweeds" and "Back Home Again in Indiana" for the Columbia LP Herb Shriner on Stage (1955). After he left Two for the Money in 1956, the show continued with fellow humorist Sam Levenson. Shriner tried a variety show on CBS which lasted almost three months (replaced by To Tell the Truth), and then played nightclubs, state fairs, showboats, and similar venues.

== Personal life ==
Shriner and his wife, Eileen "Pixie" McDermott, moved with their children to Florida, returning each summer to Angola, Indiana. Shriner invested in real estate and collected vintage automobiles. In 1970, he and his wife were killed in Delray Beach, Florida, in one of those cars, a Studebaker Avanti, when the brakes failed. Some of his collection can be seen in the Auburn Cord Duesenberg Automobile Museum in Auburn, Indiana.

Shriner's children are a daughter, Indy (named after Indianapolis, Indiana), and twin sons, actor, comedian and director Wil Shriner (named for Will Rogers) and soap opera actor Kin Shriner (named for Frank McKinney 'Kin" Hubbard, an early 20th-century Southern Indiana folk humorist).

== Television appearances ==
Program	Episode	Date/Notes
Screen Directors Playhouse	Meet the Governor	October 5, 1955
