= Rose Marie =

American actress, singer and comedian (1923–2017)

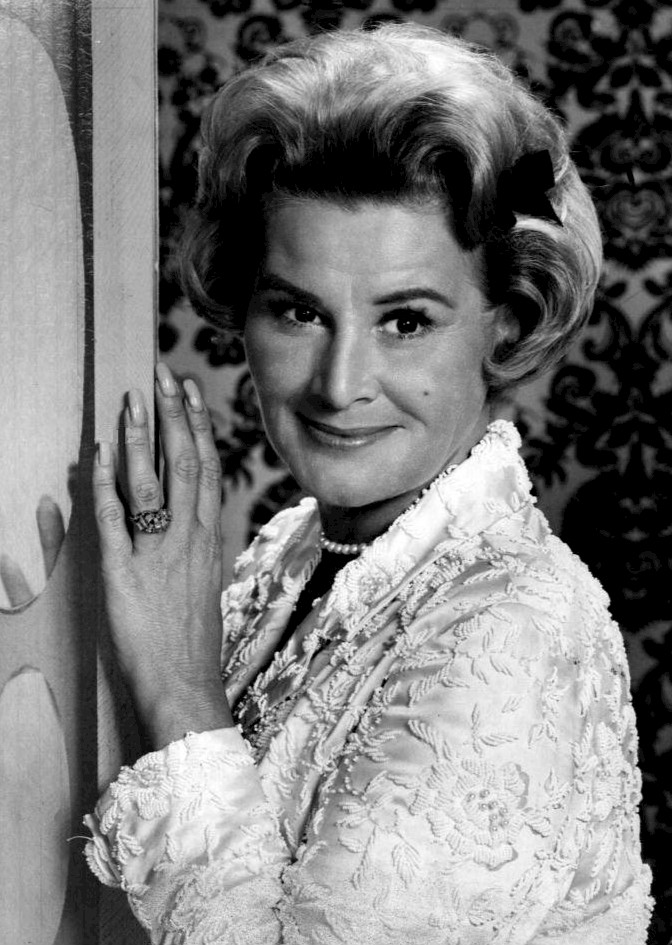
- Rose Marie in 1970
- Born: Rose Marie Mazzetta; August 15, 1923; New York City, U.S.
- Died: December 28, 2017 (aged 94); Van Nuys, California, U.S.
- Other name: Baby Rose Marie
- Occupations: Actress; singer; comedienne
- Years active: 1926–2017
- Spouse: Bobby Guy (m. 1946; died 1964)
- Children: 1

Rose Marie Guy (née Mazzetta; August 15, 1923 – December 28, 2017), known professionally as Rose Marie, was an American actress, singer, comedienne, and vaudeville performer with a career spanning nine decades, which included film, radio, records, theater, night clubs, and television. As a child performer from the late 1920s onward, she had a successful singing career under the stage name Baby Rose Marie.

Rose Marie was widely known for her role on the CBS situation comedy The Dick Van Dyke Show (1961–1966) as television comedy writer Sally Rogers, "who went toe-to-toe in a man's world". Later, she portrayed Myrna Gibbons on The Doris Day Show and was a featured celebrity on Hollywood Squares for 14 years.

She is the subject of a 2017 documentary film, Wait for Your Laugh, which includes interviews with her and her co-stars, including Carl Reiner, Dick Van Dyke, Peter Marshall, and Tim Conway.

== Early life and childhood career ==
Rose Marie was born Rose Marie Mazzetta in Manhattan, New York, on August 15, 1923, to Polish-American Stella Gluszcak and Italian-American vaudeville actor Frank Mazzetta, who went by the name of Frank Curley. Her mother took her to see local vaudeville shows regularly and afterwards Rose Marie would sing what she had heard for neighbors, who eventually entered her in a talent contest. At the age of three, Marie started performing under the name "Baby Rose Marie". At five, she was offered a seven-year contract and became a radio star on the NBC Radio Network and made a series of films.

Rose Marie later recalled:

"I had a deep voice, not like Shirley Temple but more like Sophie Tucker. I never sounded like a child, so there were some people who thought I was really a 30-year-old midget."

Baby Rose Marie the Child Wonder (1929)

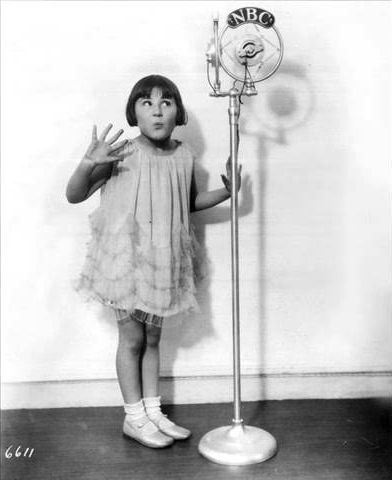
Baby Rose Marie, NBC Radio star in 1930

To counteract these rumors, NBC arranged for her to undertake a national stage tour, and she appeared in a few short films, including Baby Rose Marie the Child Wonder (1929), a Vitaphone sound short. Between 1930 and 1938, she made 17 recordings, three of which were not issued. Her first issued one, recorded on March 10, 1932, featured accompaniment by Fletcher Henderson's orchestra, one of the leading African-American jazz orchestras of the day. Henderson and the band were said to be in the RCA Victor studios recording the four songs they were intending to produce that day and were asked to accompany Baby Rose Marie, reading from a stock arrangement.

She continued to appear in films through the mid-1930s, making shorts and one feature picture, International House (1933), with W. C. Fields for Paramount.

== Adult career ==
As she entered adulthood, Rose Marie turned to nightclub and lounge performances. According to her autobiography Hold the Roses, she was assisted in her career by many members of organized crime, including Al Capone and Bugsy Siegel. In 1946, Siegel invited her to be the opening act at his newly built Flamingo Hotel and casino in Las Vegas, Nevada. Because of the Flamingo's organized-crime ties, she had to seek permission to perform in other casinos and remained loyal to "the boys" at the Flamingo for the rest of her life.

Concurrently with her nightclub work, Rose Marie continued to work in radio, earning the nickname "Darling of the Airwaves".. She appeared as a guest on The Jimmy Durante Show on 31 March 1948.

=== Television ===
In the 1960–1961 season, Marie co-starred with Shirley Bonne, Elaine Stritch, Jack Weston, Raymond Bailey, and Stubby Kaye in My Sister Eileen.

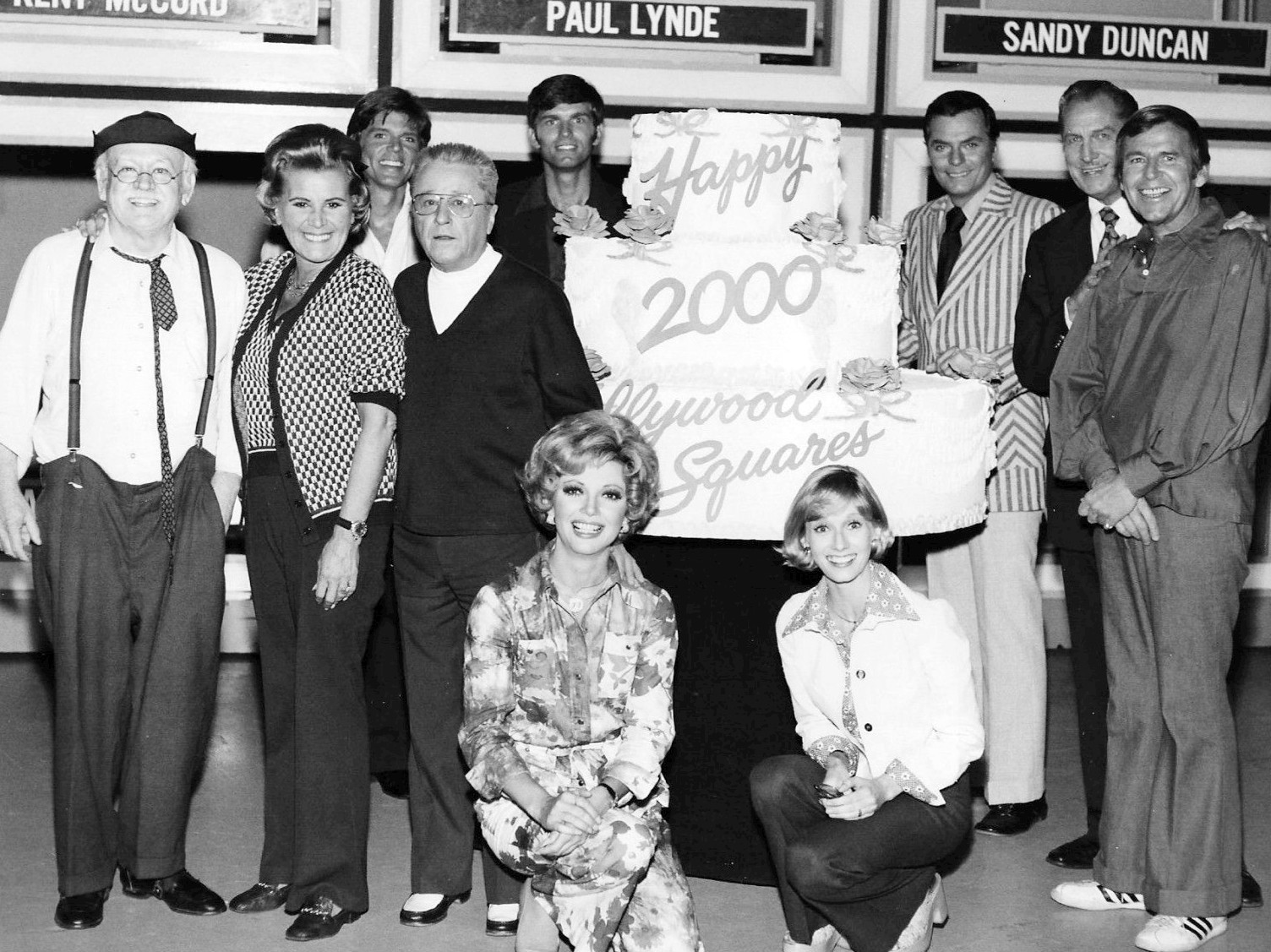
Photo from the television game show Hollywood Squares to celebrate the 2,000th episode in 1974. Pictured are Cliff Arquette as Charley Weaver, Rose Marie, John Davidson, George Gobel, Kent McCord, Peter Marshall, Vincent Price, Paul Lynde; Ruta Lee and Sandy Duncan, foreground.

After five seasons (1961–1966) as Sally Rogers on The Dick Van Dyke Show, Rose Marie co-starred in two seasons (1969–1971) of The Doris Day Show as Doris Martin's friend and co-worker Myrna Gibbons. She also appeared in two episodes of The Monkees in the mid-1960s. She later had a semiregular seat in the upper center square on the original version of The Hollywood Squares. Because contestants tended to pick corner squares first, the phrase "Rose Marie to block" was uttered so often, she frequently joked that she should legally change her name to that. In addition, Rose appeared for a special “Game Show Week (II)” on the Tom Bergeron-hosted version of Squares in 2003.

Rose Marie performed on three 1966 and 1967 episodes of The Dean Martin Show on NBC and also twice (1964 and 1968) on The Hollywood Palace on ABC.

In the mid-1970s, Rose Marie appeared in the recurring role of Hilda on the police drama S.W.A.T. Hilda brought fresh doughnuts, made coffee for the team, and provided some comic relief.

On the March 8, 1986, episode of Remington Steele, Rose Marie played a key role in "Steele in the Spotlight".

In the early 1990s, Rose Marie had a recurring role as Frank Fontana's mother on Murphy Brown.

She appeared as Roy Biggins' domineering mother Eleanor "Bluto" Biggins in an episode of Wings.

Rose Marie and The Dick Van Dyke Show co-star Morey Amsterdam appeared together in an October 1993 episode of Herman's Head and guest-starred in a February 1996 episode of Caroline in the City, shortly before Amsterdam's death in October of that same year.

=== Theater ===
Rose Marie appeared opposite Phil Silvers in the hit Broadway musical Top Banana in 1951, also appearing in the well-received 1954 film adaptation. She later claimed that her musical numbers were cut from the film in retaliation for her publicly refusing the producer's sexual advances. Near the end of her life, she testified that it was the only time she had ever experienced sexual harassment in the entertainment industry in her 90-year career.

In 1965, Rose Marie appeared in the Dallas production of Bye Bye Birdie as Mae Peterson, the mother of the character played by Dick Van Dyke on Broadway and in the film.

From 1977 to 1985, Rose Marie co-starred with Rosemary Clooney, Helen O'Connell, and Margaret Whiting in the musical revue 4 Girls 4, which toured the United States and appeared on television several times.

Rose Marie was the celebrity guest host of a comedy play, Grandmas Rock!, written by Gordon Durich. It was originally broadcast on radio in 2010 on KVTA and KKZZ, and rebroadcast on KVTA and KKZZ again in September 2012 in honor of National Grandparents Day.

== Personal life ==
Rose Marie was married to trumpeter Bobby Guy from 1946 until his death in 1964. The couple had one daughter, television producer Georgiana Guy Rodrigues.

Though it was presented in the press as romantic, in the 1970s, Rose Marie maintained a platonic relationship with Pussycat Theaters co-owner Vince Miranda.

In her later years, Rose Marie was active on social media, particularly developing a following on Twitter, where she offered support for women who, like her, had suffered from sexual harassment.

== Death ==
Rose Marie died at her home in the Van Nuys neighborhood of Los Angeles on December 28, 2017, at the age of 94. Nell Scovell memorialized her as "the patron saint of female comedy writers".

Rose Marie's long-time friend and agent, Harlan Boll, says that the legendary actress's death had to do with "age problems". Boll was with Marie shortly before she died. He explained to reporters that Marie had lain down to rest on Thursday afternoon, and by the time her caregiver checked in on her, to see if she wanted something to eat, she discovered she had stopped breathing.

== Partial filmography ==
=== Feature films ===
- International House (1933) – Rose Marie
- Top Banana (1954) – Betty Dillon
- The Big Beat (1958) – May Gordon
- Don't Worry, We'll Think of a Title (1966) – Annie
- Dead Heat on a Merry-Go-Round (1966) – Margaret Kirby
- The Memory of Us (1974) – Ida
- The Man From Clover Grove (1974) – Sister Mary
- Bruce's Deadly Fingers (1976)
- Cheaper to Keep Her (1980) – Ida Bracken
- Lunch Wagon (1981) – Mrs. Schmeckler
- Witchboard (1986) – Mrs. Moses
- The Wonderful World of Jonathan Winters (1986) – Herself
- Sandman (1993) – Car Saleswoman
- Psycho (1998) – Norma Bates (voice, uncredited)
- Lost & Found (1999) – Clara
- Shriek If You Know What I Did Last Friday the 13th (2000) – Mrs. Tingle
- Surge of Power: The Stuff of Heroes (2004) – Herself
- Forever Plaid: The Movie (2008) – Herself

=== Short subjects ===
- Baby Rose Marie the Child Wonder (1929) – Herself
- Rambling 'Round Radio Row #4 (1932)
- Sing, Babies, Sing (1933) – Herself
- Back in '23 (1933) – Herself
- Rambling 'Round Radio Row (1934) – Herself
- At the Mike (1934) – Herself – Baby Rose Marie
- Sally Swing (1938) – Sally Swing (voice, uncredited)
- Surprising Suzie (1953) – Herself

=== Television ===
- Gunsmoke (1957, Episode 94: "Twelfth Night") – Mrs. Monger
- M Squad (1958, Episode 36: "The System") – Margo
- The Bob Cummings Show (1958–1959, 9 episodes) – Martha Randolph
- The Many Loves of Dobie Gillis (1960) – Mrs. Tarantino
- My Sister Eileen (1960–1961) – Bertha
- The Dick Van Dyke Show (1961–1966) – Sally Rogers
- The Monkees (1966–1967, "Monkees in a Ghost Town", "Monkee Mother") – The Big Man, Bessie Kowalski / Milly
- The Virginian (1967) – Belle Stephens
- Walter of the Jungle (1967) (unsold pilot)
- My Three Sons (1968, Episode: "First Night Out") – Nurse Genevieve Goodbody
- The Doris Day Show (cast member 1969–1971) – Myrna Gibbons
- Honeymoon Suite (1972, 3 episodes) (with Morey Amsterdam)
- Adam-12 (1972–1973, "The Tip", "Clear with a Civilian: Part 2") – Woman at Bus Depot / Jean Wagner
- S.W.A.T. (1975) – Hilda
- Kojak (1975, episode "Two-Four-Six for Two Hundred") – Mrs. Tildon
- The Love Boat (1978–1984) – Beatrice Multon / Bertha Finch / Fourth Bridge Player / Dotty Price
- Bridge Across Time (1985, TV Movie) – Alma Bellock
- Remington Steele (1986, Series 4 Episode 17: "Steele in the Spotlight") – Billie Young
- The Jackie Bison Show (1990, unsold pilot that aired on NBC) – Doris (voice)
- Murphy Brown (1990–1991, 2 episodes) – Rose Fontana
- Mr. Belvedere (1990) – Rayna
- Scorch (1992, canceled after three episodes) – Mrs. Edna Bracken
- 2 Stupid Dogs (1993) – Mrs. Crabface (voice)
- Ultraman: The Ultimate Hero (1993)
- Hardball (1994, canceled after seven episodes) – Mitzi Balzer
- Cagney & Lacey: Together Again (1995, TV Movie) – Mitzi Glass
- Freakazoid! (1995) – Honna (voice)
- Caroline in the City (1996–1997, "Caroline and the Watch", "Caroline and the Kept Man") – Stella Dawson
- Wings (1997) – Eleanor Bluto Biggins
- Suddenly Susan (1997) – Joy
- Hey Arnold! (1998) – Agatha Caulfield (voice)
- The Hughleys (2001) – Edna
- Tracey Ullman in the Trailer Tales (2003) – Herself
- The Alan Brady Show (2003, TV Movie) – The Secretary (voice)
- Andy Richter Controls the Universe (2003) – Sylvia
- The Dick Van Dyke Show Revisited (2004, TV Movie) – Sally Rogers Glimscher
- The Garfield Show (2008–2013) – Varicella (voice)

== Bibliography ==
- Rose Marie (2002). Hold The Roses. University Press of Kentucky. ISBN 978-0813122649.
