= M Squad =

1957 American TV crime drama

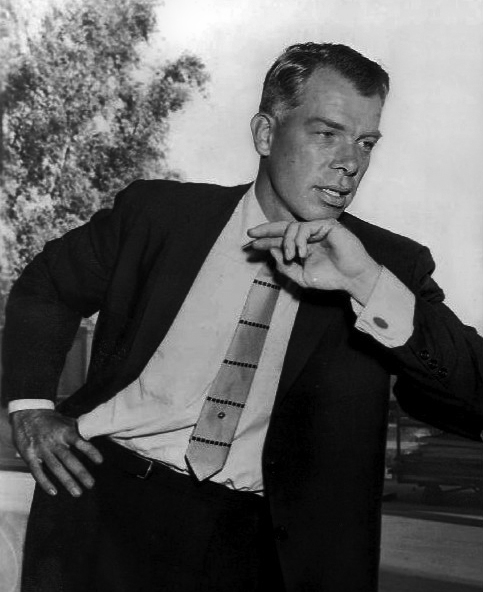
- Lee Marvin as Lt. Frank Ballinger, from NBC's M Squad in 1959.
- Genre: Crime drama
- Starring: Lee Marvin; Paul Newlan
- Composers: Main theme by Count Basie; Stanley Wilson; Incidental music and arrangements by Sonny Burke; Pete Carpenter; Benny Carter; John T. Williams; Orchestra conducted by Stanley Wilson
- Country of origin: United States
- Original language: English
- No. of seasons: 3
- No. of episodes: 117 (list of episodes)

Production
- Executive producers: John Larkin; Richard Lewis
- Producers: Robert Bassler; Maxwell Shane
- Editors: Lee Huntington; John B. Moss; Stanley Rabjohn
- Running time: 30 minutes
- Production companies: Latimer Productions; Revue Studios

Original release
- Network: NBC
- Release: September 20, 1957 – June 21, 1960

M Squad is an American crime drama television series that ran from 1957 to 1960 on NBC. It was produced by Lee Marvin's Latimer Productions and Revue Studios. Its main sponsor was the Pall Mall cigarette brand; Lee Marvin, the program's star, appeared in its commercials during many episodes. Alternate sponsors were General Electric (GE), Hazel Bishop and Bulova watches.

== Synopsis ==
Set in Chicago, Illinois, the show starred Marvin as Detective Lieutenant Frank Ballinger, a member of "M Squad", a special unit of the Chicago Police, assisting other units in battling organized crime, corruption and violent crimes citywide. Paul Newlan co-starred as his boss, Captain Grey. Although Marvin had been appearing in feature films since 1951, it was this series that made him a star, and he later went on to an even bigger film career afterward. Nelson Case was the announcer. The popularity of M Squad was proven in the ratings wars by the NBC network choosing a Friday night time slot opposite ABC's The Frank Sinatra Show in the fall of 1957 and Phil Silvers' long running CBS comedy, Sgt. Bilko, in 1958.

== Music ==
The theme music for the first season was composed by Stanley Wilson, who was nominated for the 1959 Grammy Award for the Best Soundtrack Album and Background Score from Motion Picture or Television. In the second and third seasons, the new theme was composed by Count Basie.

A soundtrack album, Music from M Squad, with liner notes by Lee Marvin, was released by RCA Victor Records in 1959 during the last season of the show.

== Home media ==
Timeless Media Group released M Squad: The Complete Series on DVD in Region 1 on November 11, 2008. This release has been discontinued and is out of print.

On November 4, 2014, Timeless Media re-released the complete series on DVD in a new 16-disc special edition collection that contains an entire disc of bonus content.

== Episodes ==
Season	Episodes	Originally released	
Season	Episodes	First released	Last released
1	38	September 20, 1957	June 13, 1958
2	40	September 19, 1958	July 3, 1959
3	39	September 18, 1959	June 21, 1960

== Guest stars ==
- Mary Adams
- Roscoe Ates
- Jimmy Baird
- Whitney Blake
- Joanna Barnes
- Rayford Barnes
- Charles Bateman
- Russ Bender
- Chet Brandenburg
- Charles Bronson
- Paul Burke
- Terry Burnham (2 episodes)
- Robert Burton
- King Calder
- Robert Carricart
- Bill Cassady
- James Chandler
- Sidney Clute
- Fred Coby
- Mike Connors
- Russ Conway
- Walter Coy
- James Coburn
- Francis De Sales
- Angie Dickinson
- Don Dubbins
- Michael Emmet
- Joe Flynn
- Richard Garland
- Robert Griffin
- Alan Hale Jr.
- Ron Hayes
- Bern Hoffman
- Clark Howat
- Robert Karnes
- Warren J. Kemmerling
- Don Kennedy
- Werner Klemperer
- Robert Knapp
- Lou Krugman
- Rusty Lane
- Tom Laughlin
- Norman Leavitt
- Ruta Lee
- Dayton Lummis
- Ken Lynch
- Herbert Lytton
- DeForest Kelley
- Nan Leslie
- Dayton Lummis
- Rose Marie
- Walter Maslow
- Carole Mathews
- John McKee
- Tyler McVey
- Joyce Meadows
- Joseph Mell
- Sid Melton
- John Mitchum
- Ed Nelson
- Leonard Nimoy
- J. Pat O'Malley
- Michael Pataki
- Robert Patten
- Joe Ploski
- Mike Ragan
- Tom Reese
- Burt Reynolds
- Don Rickles
- Janice Rule
- Penny Santon
- Frank J. Scannell
- George Selk
- Alfred Shelly
- Barbara Stuart
- Mary Treen
- Virginia Vincent
- Ralph Votrian
- H. M. Wynant

== Notes ==
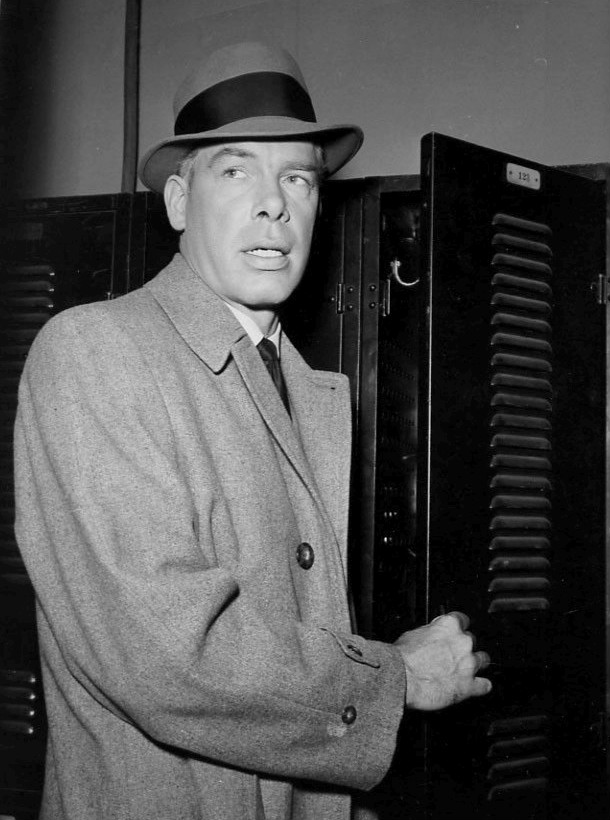
Lee Marvin in M Squad

In episode "The Jumper", an officer was depicted taking bribes. This prompted Richard J. Daley, the Mayor of Chicago at the time, to discourage motion picture and television location filming in Chicago for the rest of his administration (1955–1976). (He made an exception for the 1975 John Wayne film Brannigan, because of Daley's personal admiration for Wayne.) The Blues Brothers, released in 1980, marked the reversal of the policy under then-mayor Jane Byrne.

Lee Marvin as Lt. Frank Ballinger carried two Colt Cobra snub nosed revolvers, the lightweight variant of Colt's "Detective's Special" revolver, which was popular with detectives at the time. Lt. Ballinger was the first TV police detective, of any note, to carry a backup revolver. The second Cobra revolver was carried in a more concealed position than the other.

A novel was published in 1962, M Squad: The Chicago Cop Killer, by David Saunders. It was published by Belmont Books, New York.

The 1982 TV series Police Squad!, which spun off into The Naked Gun film, was a direct parody of M Squad. The opening credits of Police Squad are a shot-for-shot parody of the M Squad opening, and the Police Squad pilot is an extended line-for-line, shot-for-shot send-up of the season 2 M Squad episode "More Deadly".
