= Stubby Kaye =

American actor, comedian, vaudevillian, and singer (1918–1997)

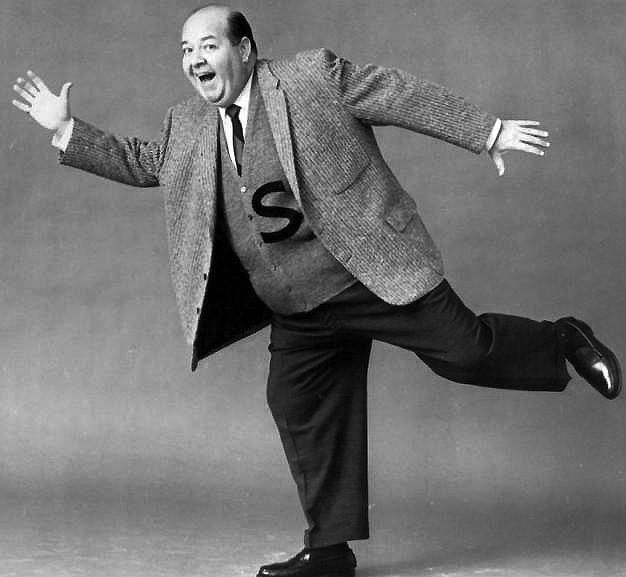
- Kaye in 1964, promoting the game show Shenanigans
- Born: Bernard Shalom Kotzin; November 11, 1918; Morningside Heights, Manhattan, New York, U.S.
- Died: December 14, 1997 (aged 79); Rancho Mirage, California, U.S.
- Occupations: Actor; comedian; vaudevillian; singer
- Years active: 1939–1988
- Spouses: Jeanne Watson (m. 1960; div. 1961) Angela Bracewell (m. 1967)

Bernard Shalom Kotzin (November 11, 1918 – December 14, 1997), known professionally as Stubby Kaye, was an American actor, comedian, vaudevillian, and singer, known for his appearances on Broadway and in film musicals.

Kaye originated the roles of Nicely-Nicely Johnson in Guys and Dolls and Marryin' Sam in Li'l Abner, introducing two show-stopping numbers of the era: "Sit Down, You're Rockin' the Boat" and "Jubilation T. Cornpone". He reprised these roles in the movie versions of the shows. His other well-known roles include Herman in Bob Fosse's Sweet Charity, Sam the Shade in Cat Ballou, and Marvin Acme in Who Framed Roger Rabbit.

== Biography ==
Kaye was first generation-born Bernard Sholom Kotzin in 1918, at West 114th Street in the Morningside Heights section of Manhattan. He kept his original name secret throughout his career. His parents were Jewish Americans originally from Russia and Austria-Hungary. His father, David Kotzin, was a dress salesman, and the former Harriet "Hattie" Freundlish was his mother. He was raised in the Far Rockaway section of Queens and later in the Bronx, where he acted in student productions at DeWitt Clinton High School, and from where he graduated in 1937.

In 1939, he won the Major Bowes Amateur Hour contest on radio where the prize included touring in vaudeville, where he was sometimes billed as an "Extra Padded Attraction". During the Second World War, he joined the USO and toured battle fronts and made his London debut performing with Bob Hope. After the war, he continued to work in vaudeville and as master of ceremonies for the swing orchestras of Freddy Martin and Charlie Barnet.

As Nicely-Nicely Johnson in Guys and Dolls, first on Broadway (1950) and then in the film version (1955), Kaye introduced "Fugue for Tinhorns" ("I got the horse right here, his name is Paul Revere...") and "Sit Down, You're Rockin' the Boat". He created the role of Marryin' Sam in Li'l Abner on Broadway (1956), introducing the song "Jubilation T. Cornpone". In 1957, he was named best actor in a musical by the Outer Critics Circle. In his New York Times review, Brooks Atkinson said Kaye sang "it with that vaudeville rhythm and those vaudeville blandishments that turn song numbers into triumphant occasions." He also played the role in the film (1959). His next Broadway show, Everybody Loves Opal, starring Eileen Heckart, closed after 21 performances in 1961.

In 1956, he co-starred with June Allyson and Jack Lemmon in the filmYou Can't Run Away from It, a musical remake of It Happened One Night. He played the title character in Michael Winner's British film The Cool Mikado (1962), based on Gilbert and Sullivan's comic opera, The Mikado.

In the mid-1950s, Kaye guest starred on NBC's early sitcom The Martha Raye Show. In 1958, he appeared on the short-lived NBC variety show The Gisele MacKenzie Show. About this time, he also appeared on ABC's The Pat Boone Chevy Showroom. In the 1959–60 television season, Kaye co-starred in the short-lived NBC sitcom Love and Marriage.

In the 1960–61 television season, Kaye appeared as Marty, the agent of aspiring actress Eileen Sherwood, in the CBS sitcom My Sister Eileen, starring Shirley Bonne, Elaine Stritch, Jack Weston, Raymond Bailey, and Rose Marie.

In the 1960s, Kaye became known as the host of a weekly children's talent show, Stubby's Silver Star Show. During the 1962–63 television season, he was a regular on Stump the Stars. On April 14, 1963, he guest-starred as Tubby Mason in NBC's Ensign O'Toole, a comedy series, starring Dean Jones.

From 1964 to 1965, Kaye hosted the Saturday-morning ABC children's game show Shenanigans, a children's television game show produced by Heatter-Quigley Productions that aired from September 26, 1964, to March 20, 1965, and again from September 25 to December 18, 1965. He was dubbed "the Mayor of Shenanigans" and sang the theme song.

Kaye and Nat King Cole portrayed banjo-playing minstrels who sang the title song in the Western/comedy Cat Ballou (1965), starring Jane Fonda and Lee Marvin. He played Herman in the Universal musical film Sweet Charity (1969), directed by Bob Fosse and starring Shirley MacLaine in the title role. In that movie, he sang the song "I Love to Cry at Weddings".

During his career, he appeared on the television shows The Red Skelton Hour, The Millionaire, Burke's Law, The Monkees, The Smothers Brothers Comedy Hour, Adam-12, and Love, American Style.

Kaye's later stage productions included the 1974 Broadway revival of Good News, Man of Magic in London (with Stuart Damon as Harry Houdini), and the 1975 production of The Ritz, in which he replaced Jack Weston. His final Broadway show was Grind, co-starring Ben Vereen, in 1985. He made a guest appearance in the British series Doctor Who, in the serial "Delta and the Bannermen" (1987). His final feature-film role was as Marvin Acme in Robert Zemeckis's film Who Framed Roger Rabbit (1988).

Kaye died at his Rancho Mirage, California, home of lung cancer on December 14, 1997, at the age of 79. He was survived by his wife, Angela Bracewell, whom he married in England in 1966.

== Partial filmography ==
- Taxi (1953) - Morris (uncredited)
- Guys and Dolls (1955) - Nicely-Nicely Johnson
- The Revolt of Mamie Stover (1956) - Howard Sloan (scenes deleted)
- You Can't Run Away from It (1956) - Fred Toten
- Li'l Abner (1959) - Marryin' Sam
- 40 Pounds of Trouble (1962) - Cranston
- The Cool Mikado (1963) - Judge Herbert Mikado / Charlie Hotfleisch
- The Alfred Hitchcock Hour (1963) (Season 2 Episode 10: "Good-Bye, George") - George Cassidy
- Sex and the Single Girl (1964) - Helen's Cabbie
- Cat Ballou (1965) - Shouter / Sam the Shade
- The Way West (1967) - Sam Fairman
- Sweet Charity (1969) - Herman
- Can Heironymus Merkin Ever Forget Mercy Humppe and Find True Happiness? (1969) - Fat Writer
- The Monitors (1969) - Man in Monitors Commercial
- The Cockeyed Cowboys of Calico County (1970) - Bartender
- Cool It Carol! (1970) - Rod Strangeways
- Six Pack Annie (1975) - Mr. Bates
- Timber Tramps (1975)
- Goldie and the Boxer Go to Hollywood (1981, TV movie) - Babe
- Ellis Island (1984) (TV Miniseries) - Abe Shulman
- Doctor Who (Delta and the Bannermen, 1987) - Weismuller
- Who Framed Roger Rabbit (1988, final film) - Marvin Acme
