= My Sister Eileen (TV series) =

1960 American sitcom

- Genre: Sitcom
- Starring: Elaine Stritch; Shirley Bonne; Jack Weston
- Theme music composer: Earle Hagen
- Composer: Herbert W. Spencer
- Country of origin: United States
- Original language: English
- No. of seasons: 1
- No. of episodes: 26

Production
- Producer: Dick Wesson
- Camera setup: Multi-camera
- Running time: 22–24 minutes
- Production company: Screen Gems

Original release
- Network: CBS
- Release: October 5, 1960 – April 12, 1961

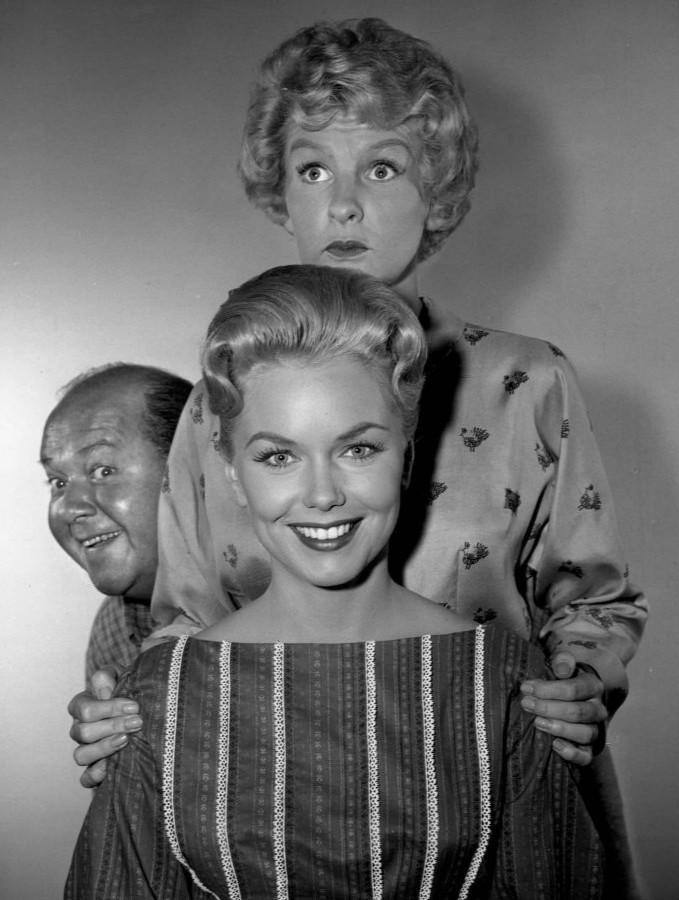
Clockwise from left: Stubby Kaye, Shirley Bonne, and Elaine Stritch in My Sister Eileen in 1960.

My Sister Eileen is an American sitcom broadcast during the 1960–1961 television season. It depicts the lives of two sisters, one a writer and the other an actress, who move to New York City to further their careers.

== Premise ==
My Sister Eileen focuses on Ruth and Eileen Sherwood, sisters from Ohio who moved to New York City to pursue their respective careers. Ruth, the more serious and more sensible of the two, aspires to be a writer, while the younger and more attractive Eileen dreams of achieving success as an actress. The two women find an apartment in a Greenwich Village brownstone owned by Mr. Appopoplous and befriend reporter Chick Adams. Ruth accepts a job with publisher D. X. Beaumont and becomes close with her co-worker Bertha. However, the better part of her time is spent supervising Eileen, who has a tendency to fall for every con artist and potential boyfriend who crosses her path while her agent Marty Scott struggles to find her auditions.

== Cast ==
- Elaine Stritch as Ruth Sherwood
- Anne Helm as Eileen Sherwood (pilot episode)
- Shirley Bonne as Eileen Sherwood (all other episodes)
- Jack Weston as Chick Adams
- Rose Marie as Bertha
- Raymond Bailey as D. X. Beaumont
- Stubby Kaye as Marty Scott
- Leon Belasco as Mr. Appopoplous
- Agnes Moorehead as Aunt Harriet (recurring)

== Production ==
My Sister Eileen was based on a series of autobiographical short stories by Ruth McKenney originally published in The New Yorker and then published in book form in 1938, as well as the 1940 play and 1942 and 1955 film adaptations which the stories inspired.

== Broadcast history ==
The pilot for My Sister Eileen aired on May 16, 1960, as an episode of Alcoa-Goodyear Theater entitled "You Should Meet My Sister." Anne Helm portrayed Eileen in this episode.

In addition to the pilot, 26 episodes — all with Shirley Bonne portraying Eileen — were produced for My Sister Eileen′s run as a regular series on CBS. The series premiered on October 5, 1960, and was broadcast at 9:00 p.m. Eastern Time and Pacific Time throughout its run. It aired opposite Hawaiian Eye on ABC and Perry Como's Kraft Music Hall on NBC.The final new episode aired on April 12, 1961.

== Episodes ==
No.	Title	Directed by	Written by	Original release date
Pilot	"You Should Meet My Sister"	Unknown	Unknown	May 16, 1960
The pilot for the series, broadcast as an episode of Alcoa-Goodyear Theater. Two pretty sisters, Ruth and Eileen Sherwood, move from Ohio to New York City to further their careers, the older sister Ruth as a writer and her younger sister Eileen as an actress. Anne Helm portrayed Eileen in this episode; Shirley Bonne replaced her in the role for the regular series. Guest stars: Henry Corden, Tom Reese, and Pattie Chapman.
1	"The Photography Mix-Up"	Unknown	Unknown	October 5, 1960
Thanks to a case of mistaken identity, Ruth and Eileen think that they are going to be featured in a fashion magazine, but then discover that it is a cheesecake magazine and that they are expected to pose in the nude.
2	"Super Ruth Saves Eileen"	Unknown	Unknown	October 12, 1960
Eileen is interviewed by a girl-crazy producer and Ruth dreams of heroically rescuing Eileen from him.
3	"Ruth Sells a Story"	Unknown	Unknown	October 19, 1960
Ruth gets angry when the editor of a B-grade magazine tries to add the wrong kind of color to a story she wrote.
4	"Ruth Becomes a Waitress"	Unknown	Unknown	October 26, 1960
Ruth's boss ignores her pleas for a raise, but she embarrasses him into giving her one when Eileen lands a part in a play and she substitutes for Eileen at her waitressing job.
5	"The Lease-Breakers"	Unknown	Unknown	November 2, 1960
Ruth and Eileen try to break their apartment lease by throwing a wild party.
6	"Eileen's Big Chance"	Unknown	Unknown	November 9, 1960
Eileen accepts the career advice of an attentive playboy and finally lands a nice part in a new play, but Ruth discovers that he is a notorious "wolf," and the playwright meets an editor who tells him Eileen's role should be rewritten as a much older character.
7	"Ruth Welcomes a Hometown Friend"	Unknown	Unknown	November 16, 1960
Ruth gets a contract to write an erudite article for Milady Fair magazine, but the arrival of a man she grew up with interrupts her work.
8	"Monkey Shines"	Unknown	Unknown	November 23, 1960
Ruth and Eileen become the foster parents of a four-year-old chimpanzee.
9	"The Perfect Male"	Unknown	Unknown	December 7, 1960
When Eileen falls for a self-assured executive who tries to mold her into an "organization woman" who will make the perfect wife, Ruth and a prospective seven-year-old neighbor join forces to scuttle the romance by punching holes in his self-assurance.
10	"Three's a Crowd"	Unknown	Unknown	December 14, 1960
Ruth's coworker at the Parkview Publishing Company moves in with Ruth and Eileen at their apartment to help pay the rent.
11	"Ebenezer Scrooge Appopolus"	Unknown	Unknown	December 21, 1960
Annoyed at not being invited to his apartment building's Christmas party, Mr. Appopolus forbids all Christmas festivities in Ruth's and Eileen's building.
12	"Eileen and the Intern"	Unknown	Unknown	December 28, 1960
Ruth and Eileen involve Marty and Eileen's intern boyfriend in making a home movie based on a script Ruth wrote.
13	"Eileen Becomes a Star"	Unknown	Unknown	January 4, 1961
To impress a suitor, Eileen pretends to have a lead role in a play and unwittingly prevents the show's temperamental star from walking out.
14	"The Perfect Secretary"	Unknown	Unknown	January 11, 1961
Ruth takes a job as secretary for television producer Charles Alexander in hopes of finding Eileen work as an actress.
15	"Ruth's Double Life"	Unknown	Unknown	January 25, 1961
After Ruth takes on extra work by writing for a confession magazine, she tries to hide her new job by doing the writing for it in her diary — but her plan backfires when Bertha finds the diary.
16	"Barefoot and Unashamed"	Unknown	Unknown	February 1, 1961
Ruth's boss at the publishing company assigns her to escort one of the firm's top writers — a big, brawling type of man — around town when he visits New York City.
17	"Ruth Becomes a Success"	Unknown	Unknown	February 8, 1961
Frankie Avalon gives Ruth her first big break when he becomes interested in doing the television musical she wrote — and he and Eileen sing together. Guest star: Frankie Avalon.
18	"Ruth, the Starmaker"	Unknown	Unknown	February 15, 1961
When Eileen becomes discouraged with her unsuccessful acting career and decides to give it up, Ruth dreams up a scheme to entice her to stay in New York City.
19	"About Clark Carter"	Unknown	Unknown	February 22, 1961
Eileen's budding romance with a young attorney suffers when a gold-digging siren tries to steal him away.
20	"Aunt Harriet's Way"	Unknown	Unknown	March 1, 1961
Ruth's and Eileen's Aunt Harriet comes to visit from Columbus, Ohio, and tries to convince Ruth that the way to catch a man is to appear helpless and weak. Guest star: Agnes Moorehead.
21	"Ruth's Fella"	Unknown	Unknown	March 8, 1961
Ruth has learned that men she has a romantic interest in often lose interest in her when they meet Eileen, so she decides that she must keep her latest love interest, Van Peterson. from meeting Eileen when she invites him to their apartment for a home-cooked dinner. Guest stars: Richard Webb and Allen Jung.
22	"Separate Ways"	Unknown	Unknown	March 15, 1961
Ruth decides that Eileen is too dependent upon her, so she establishes Eileen in an apartment of her own and the two sisters go their separate ways.
23	"The Reformer"	Unknown	Unknown	March 22, 1961
Ruth and Eileen ask an officer to help them save a juvenile delinquent from getting in trouble with the law.
24	"The Protectors"	Unknown	Unknown	March 29, 1961
While Eileen is performing in a show in Boston, Aunt Harriet returns to New York City for another visit and agrees to give a strange man $10,000 to invest for her. Guest star: Agnes Moorehead
25	"Marty's Best Friend"	Unknown	Unknown	April 5, 1961
Marty's friend Frank Marshall keeps belittling Marty in public to make himself look better, and Eileen and Ruth eventually intervene and put Frank in his place.
26	"Ruth's Holiday"	Unknown	Unknown	April 12, 1961
Ruth plans a weekend vacation to go skiing, but fears that Eileen will not be able to take care of herself during her absence. Eileen promises to stay out of trouble while Ruth is away and persuades her to take the trip — but then Eileen sprains her ankle. Guest stars: Kurt Kreuger, George Eldredge, and Paul Barselow.
