= Remington Steele =

American detective fiction series (1982–1987)

- Genre: Action-adventure; Crime thriller; Detective procedural; Drama; Romantic comedy; Spy-fi
- Created by: Robert Butler; Michael Gleason
- Starring: Stephanie Zimbalist; Pierce Brosnan; Doris Roberts
- Narrated by: Stephanie Zimbalist (season 1 titles only)
- Theme music composer: Henry Mancini
- Opening theme: "The Remington Steele Theme", composed by Henry Mancini
- Ending theme: "Laura Holt's Tune", composed by Henry Mancini
- Composer: Richard Lewis Warren
- Country of origin: United States
- Original language: English
- No. of seasons: 5
- No. of episodes: 94 (list of episodes)

Production
- Executive producer: Michael Gleason
- Producers: Kevin Inch; Gareth Davies; Richard DeRoy
- Production location: Los Angeles
- Cinematography: Edward R. Brown; Kenneth Peach Jr.; Dennis Matsuda
- Running time: 60 minutes (including commercials)
- Production company: MTM Enterprises

Original release
- Network: NBC
- Release: October 1, 1982 – February 17, 1987

Remington Steele is an American detective fiction television series co-created by Robert Butler and Michael Gleason. The series, starring Stephanie Zimbalist and Pierce Brosnan, was produced by MTM Enterprises and first broadcast on NBC from October 1, 1982, to February 17, 1987. The series blended the genres of romantic comedy, drama, detective procedural and (toward the end of the series) international political intrigue and espionage.

Remington Steele's premise is that Laura Holt, a licensed private investigator (Stephanie Zimbalist), opened a detective agency under her own name but found potential clients refused to hire a woman, no matter how qualified. To solve the problem, Laura invents a fictitious male superior she names Remington Steele. Through a series of events in the first episode, "License to Steele", Pierce Brosnan's character, a former thief and con man (whose real name even he proves not to know and is never revealed), assumes the identity of Remington Steele. Behind the scenes, a power struggle ensues between Laura and Steele as to who is really in charge, while the two carry on a casual romantic relationship.

Try this for a deep, dark secret: the great detective, Remington Steele? He doesn't exist. I invented him. Follow. I always loved excitement, so I studied, and apprenticed, and put my name on an office. But absolutely nobody knocked down my door. A female private investigator seemed so... "feminine". So I invented a superior, a decidedly "masculine" superior. Suddenly, there were cases around the block. It was working like a charm...until the day "HE" walked in, with his blue eyes and mysterious past. And before I knew it, he assumed Remington Steele's identity. Now I do the work and he takes the bows. It's a dangerous way to live, but as long as people buy it, I can get the job done. We never mixed business with pleasure. Well, almost never. I don't even know his real name!

— Laura Holt's season 1 opening narration

== Cast ==
=== Main ===
- Stephanie Zimbalist as Laura Holt, a private investigator who starts her own business. It didn't really take off until after she created a fictional male boss and named the agency after him; she would tell clients Mr. Steele was "out of town" working on an important case, and would handle their cases herself. The struggling agency became notably more successful after Mr. Steele became an actual person with whom clients interacted.
- Pierce Brosnan as Remington Steele, a mysterious man who assumes the figurehead role as the boss and namesake of Holt's agency. He does not have any actual experience as a detective, but learns quickly. He often makes references to old films, and his behavior and instincts often gives Holt insight towards solving the mystery. Although he has worked mostly as a con man and thief in the past, he stays loyal to Holt. His real name is a mystery throughout the series; at one point before becoming Steele he called himself "Harry", but this is also known to be an alias.
- James Read as Murphy Michaels (season 1), an investigator who works for Holt; he and Foxe knew that Steele is not a real detective. He has an underlying rivalry with him for Holt's affections. In the season 2 premiere, it is said that he moved to Denver to start his own private practice.
- Janet DeMay as Bernice Foxe (season 1), Holt's secretary and receptionist who also helped keep up the fictional boss act. In the season 2 premiere, it is said she married a trombone player and moved to New York.
- Doris Roberts as Mildred Krebs (seasons 2–5), a former IRS agent who becomes Steele's secretary / receptionist.
- Jack Scalia as Tony Roselli (season 5), a mysterious guy who gets involved in Holt and Steele's life after their honeymoon in Mexico, as a rival for Holt's affections. He uses his connections to the U.S. Immigration and Naturalization Service to track the two down and also to get Steele to help him out. Gleason conceived of Roselli as a contrast to Steele's character, being like a "beer to Remington's champagne", but that he was also a "very good-looking guy".

=== Recurring ===
- Blake Clark as Fred, Steele's chauffeur whenever he does any formal traveling
- Beverly Garland as Abigail Holt, Laura's mother
- Cassandra Harris (Pierce Brosnan's then wife) as Felicia, one of Steele's old flames (three episodes), and Anna, a mysterious woman from Steele's past (one episode)
- Efrem Zimbalist Jr. (father of Stephanie) as Daniel Chalmers, a charming con man who was Steele's mentor. At the end of the series, he is revealed to be his biological father.
- Gary Frank as Detective James Jarvis, a less-than-competent police detective who more often than not falsely accused the principal characters and their clients of murder
- Michael Constantine as George Edward Mulch, a businessman with far-fetched ideas looking only for fame and fortune
- James Tolkan as Norman Keyes, an insurance investigator bent on proving Steele to be a fraud

=== Guest stars ===
- Louie Anderson, "Steele Spawning", Season 4
- Tom Baker, "Hounded Steele" Season 2
- Judith Barsi, "Suburban Steele", Season 4
- Thom Bray, "Signed, Steeled and Delivered", Season 1
- Delta Burke, "Altared Steele", Season 2
- Daniel Davis, "Gourmet Steele", Season 3
- Geena Davis, "Steele in the Chips", Season 3
- Sarah Douglas, "Steele Hanging In There", Season 5
- Whitey Ford and Mickey Mantle, "Second Base Steele", Season 3
- Conrad Janis, "Stronger Than Steele", Season 3
- Jeffrey Jones, "A Steele at Any Price", Season 2
- Jane Kaczmarek, "Altared Steele", Season 2
- Betty Kennedy, "Steele Waters Run Deep", Season 1
- Dorothy Lamour, "Cast in Steele", Season 3
- John Larroquette, "Breath of Steele", Season 3
- Judith Light, "Dreams of Steele", Season 2
- Rose Marie, "Steele in the Spotlight", Season 4
- A Martinez, "High Flying Steele", Season 2
- Virginia Mayo, "Cast of Steele", Season 3
- Beverlee McKinsey, "Vintage Steele", Season 1
- Lloyd Nolan, "Cast in Steele", Season 3
- Annie Potts, "Steele Crazy After All These Years", Season 1
- Faith Prince, "Scene Steelers", Season 2
- Ford Rainey, ”Small Town Steele”, Season 2
- Paul Reiser, "A Good Night's Steele", Season 1
- Peter Scolari, "Steele Waters Run Deep", Season 1
- Tracy Scoggins, "Steele in the News", Season 1
- Jean Smart, "Steele in the Chips", Season 3
- Sharon Stone, "Steele Crazy After All These Years", Season 1
- John van Dreelen, ”Steele Threads", Season 2
- Barry Van Dyke, "Steele Belted", Season 1
- Guy Boyd, "Hearts of Steele", "Steele Framed", "Elegy of Steele", Season 1 & 2

== Episodes ==
| Season | Episodes | Originally released | |
| Season | Episodes | First released | Last released |
|---|---|---|---|
| 1 | 22 | October 1, 1982 | April 12, 1983 |
| 2 | 22 | September 20, 1983 | May 22, 1984 |
| 3 | 22 | September 25, 1984 | May 14, 1985 |
| 4 | 22 | September 24, 1985 | May 10, 1986 |
| 5 | 6 | January 5, 1987 | February 17, 1987 |

== Significance and influence ==
Remington Steele is best known for having launched the career of Pierce Brosnan and for serving as a forerunner of the similar, edgier series Moonlighting, and was also an influential part of television history in its own right. Recent evaluations, in the wake of the show's full release on DVD, conclude that Steele was solidly crafted, well acted and groundbreaking in its own way. Other recent evaluations have also noted that series has aged better than some other series of its time and genre.

=== Innovations ===
Remington Steele referred to film noir in the mystery storylines. It subverted 1970s detective show conventions by telling its stories from the point of view of an independent, professional woman. At a time when hour-long series were serious and half-hour series were humorous, Steele incorporated multiple styles of comedy into the standard detective format. It pioneered the slowly evolving "will they or won't they" relationship arc that is now common to television drama of all genres.

=== Laura Holt as role model ===
In an interview recorded in 2005 for a DVD special feature, Remington Steele co-creator Michael Gleason and star Stephanie Zimbalist discuss the large number of women who have approached them over the years to express their appreciation for the character of Laura Holt. Speaking of the women she meets, Zimbalist said: "They are extraordinary women.... They are interesting. They do interesting things. They are smart. They're independent. They're sort of, what my character was – and I meet them all the time".

Also in 2005, Robin Rauzi published an article in the Los Angeles Times saying that Laura Holt was her hero. In a subsequent interview Rauzi elaborated, saying that Laura "was one of the only examples of an unmarried modern career woman on TV that I could identify with at that time" and that Laura "didn’t seem that far away from who I was and who I could be". Rauzi concludes: "I’ve decided to stop being embarrassed to say Remington Steele changed my life. It did and for the better".

== Series history ==
=== Development ===
Remington Steele’s initial premise was conceived in 1969 by long-time television director Robert Butler as a series featuring a solo female private investigator. Butler pitched the idea to Grant Tinker before he was head of MTM, but Tinker felt the series was ahead of its time. In January 1980, following the success of several sitcoms featuring working women, including the groundbreaking The Mary Tyler Moore Show, Butler and Tinker, now head of MTM, revived the concept. MTM Vice President of Programming Stu Erwin felt Butler's concept was only "half a show" and suggested that Butler work with veteran writer Michael Gleason to expand the premise. Imagining Holt's fictional boss, Gleason proposed to Butler: "Wouldn’t it be great if he showed up and made her crazy?" In 1981, Gleason, Butler, Erwin and Tinker pitched the series to NBC and were initially rejected by executives who failed to "get" the premise. Shortly thereafter, Tinker left MTM to become chairman of NBC, then the number-three network, and subsequently a pilot was ordered.

Stephanie Zimbalist, an established actress with roles in several television movies, was approached for the role of Laura Holt. At first she turned the series down, not wishing to be tied down to one show, but had a late-night change of heart. Pierce Brosnan (best known then for his role in The Manions of America) auditioned for the role of Remington Steele but was initially refused by NBC executives who were concerned that he was a relative unknown in America. MTM's Stu Erwin stood firm in a face-to-face meeting with NBC executive Brandon Tartikoff, and Tartikoff relented.

Originally, NBC asked for a pilot that imagined the series six months into its run, with the characters already working together in the detective agency. This pilot was produced in February and March 1982 and was eventually aired with revisions as "Tempered Steele". NBC had some concerns about audience confusion over this episode, but ultimately agreed to schedule the series for the 1982–83 season. NBC also asked for a premise pilot which told the story of how Laura Holt met the man who became Remington Steele. This second pilot, "License to Steele", became the first episode aired in the series.

Pierce Brosnan and Stephanie Zimbalist in Remington Steele

=== Season 1 ===
The first season included two recurring characters: Murphy Michaels, a detective and rival for Laura's affections, played by James Read, and Bernice Foxe, the secretary-receptionist, played by Janet DeMay. Both Murphy and Bernice knew that Remington Steele was a fraud. Episodes in the first season set in motion the slow evolution of the romantic relationship between Laura and "Mr. Steele" (she never called him "Remington" until the show's fifth season after they were "married") while revealing elements of the characters' backstory. The first season established the pattern where each episode made direct reference to an old movie (for example, The Maltese Falcon and The Thomas Crown Affair, which was remade in 1999 with Pierce Brosnan in the lead role of Thomas Crown). Key episodes include "Thou Shalt Not Steele", which introduced Laura's mother and Felicia, a woman from Steele's past; "Sting of Steele", which introduced Daniel Chalmers (Efrem Zimbalist Jr., the real-life father of Stephanie) as Steele's former mentor; and "Vintage Steele", a fan favorite that focused on Laura's past. Additionally, writer Joel Steiger won an Edgar Award from the Mystery Writers of America for his script for the first-season episode "In The Steele of the Night". Remington Steele also received strong critical reviews in the first season, noting its intelligence and stylish sophistication.

=== Season 2 ===
At the end of season one, James Read made Michael Gleason aware that he was unhappy with the direction of his character. Gleason released him from the series and also let Janet DeMay go, thinking that the detective/investigator and secretary characters could be combined into one character. Gleason originally wrote the replacement character, Mildred Krebs, as an attractive 35-year-old woman who was a rival for Steele's affections. Doris Roberts, an established character actress who had recently won an Emmy for a guest role on St. Elsewhere, asked to read for the part. Although Roberts was not the right age for the character Gleason originally conceived, she won him over with her audition. Gleason then changed the character of Mildred Krebs to reflect the casting (her first appearance in the first episode of the second season was as an IRS inspector investigating Steele's taxes). The character, being new to the agency, did not know that Remington Steele was an imposter, and treated Steele as the company head.

NBC moved the series from Friday to Tuesday nights at 9pm following The A-Team, increasing its budget and prominence on the network schedule. The second season continued the slow evolution of the relationship between Laura and Steele as he became a more competent detective. Key episodes include the two-hour season premiere, "Steele Away With Me", filmed on location in Mexico; "Red Holt Steele", a fan-favorite dramatic episode in which Laura's house is destroyed in an explosion; and "Love Among the Steele", another fan-favorite episode in which the agency acquires a 1936 Auburn Boattail Speedster, which was used symbolically in several subsequent episodes.

=== Season 3 ===
Remington Steele achieved its greatest ratings success in the third season, finishing the year in the top 25. Key third-season episodes included the premiere, "Steele At It", shot on location in Cannes; "Steele Your Heart Away", shot on location in Ireland; and "Maltese Steele", shot on location in Malta. The season also included "Steele Trying", set in San Francisco and featuring the songs of Tony Bennett, and "Diced Steele", filmed on location in Las Vegas. "Puzzled Steele" earned Doris Roberts an Emmy nomination for best supporting actress. The third season also included an episode, "Steele in the Chips", co-written by Stephanie Zimbalist and writing partner Robin Bernheim. The final episode of the season ended with a cliffhanger as Laura and Steele seemed to be going their separate ways. Michael Gleason explained to the Los Angeles Times, "We want to pull the relationship apart and bring it back together again with a little bit different attitude."

=== Season 4 ===
Season four was the final full season of the series. In the two-part season opener, "Steele Searching", filmed on location in London, Mildred Krebs learned of Steele's secret, changing the dynamics of the trio. Other key episodes, including "Forged Steele", "Steele in the Spotlight", and "Sensitive Steele", continued the slow evolution of the romantic relationship between the main characters. Facing a possible cancellation by NBC (whose fortunes had now changed to become the number-one network) Gleason contrived a phony marriage between the characters in the final episode of season four, "Bonds of Steele", as an attempt to garner additional interest and provoke NBC to pick up the series for a fifth season.

=== Proposals for season 5 ===
Gleason originally wanted the characters to have a real marriage at the end of season four and had plans for how to change the series in season five to accommodate the change, but both Brosnan and Zimbalist rejected the idea. Following that decision, Gleason pitched another concept for season five to NBC in May 1986, introducing a character named "Tony" as a rival for Laura's affections.

==== Brief cancellation ====
The series was cancelled at the end of the 1985–86 television season, although it was still winning its timeslot most weeks. According to Michael Gleason, Brandon Tartikoff's decision to give an early pick-up to the Stephen J. Cannell series Hunter left no room on the NBC schedule for Remington Steele. Two months after the cancellation, NBC executive Warren Littlefield reversed the decision, responding to an outpouring of support from fans and a sharp upswing in the show's ratings during the summer of 1986.

The cancellation and reversal affected film role opportunities for Brosnan and Zimbalist, as both had received firm offers to do films in the interim. Albert R. Broccoli offered Brosnan the part of James Bond for the film The Living Daylights. Following NBC's reversal, Broccoli stated he did not want Bond to be identified with a current TV series and instead gave the role to Timothy Dalton. Brosnan became 007 in 1995, making his debut in the film GoldenEye. Zimbalist had accepted the role of Officer Anne Lewis in the science-fiction movie RoboCop, but she was forced to pull out of that production, to be replaced by Nancy Allen.

==== Final season ====
NBC reversed the cancellation but did not slot a full 22-episode season into their schedule. The final abbreviated season consisted of six hours of made-for-TV films broadcast in early 1987, including installments filmed on location in Mexico, London, and Ireland. Jack Scalia joined the cast as a rival for Laura's affections. The circumstances surrounding Steele's birth as well as the identity of Steele's father are revealed in the final episode. The final scene of the series implied that Steele and Laura were about to consummate their relationship.

=== Rumors of discord ===
Although part of the show's appeal was the sexual tension between the main characters, in real life the production was dogged for years by rumors that its two leads did not get along. Brosnan and Zimbalist have admitted some level of personal conflict in press interviews during and since, attributing some of it to the stress of long working hours, while also maintaining that it did not damage their ability to work together. Doris Roberts confirmed that Zimbalist and Brosnan rarely spoke to each other and that such tension played a role in the series' end: "It was awful. They didn't talk to each other." Whatever discord there may have been at the time of production, Brosnan and Zimbalist speak fondly of one another in more recent interviews and are occasionally in touch. In an interview included on the DVD release of Season 1, Brosnan says they did get along and trusted one another professionally. Brosnan also praises Zimbalist's acting on his official website, saying that he would work with her again on the right project. Zimbalist returned the compliment in a 2011 interview with the New Jersey Star-Ledger, saying "Pierce Brosnan is a very sweet man. Oh, we had our issues, but a lot of it was hormones."

=== Potential projects ===
==== Film ====
With the release of the series on DVD in 2005, Pierce Brosnan expressed interest in developing a Remington Steele feature film through his production company, Irish Dream Time, but later stated on his web site that it is unlikely to be produced.

==== Television ====
In October 2013, NBC announced plans to reboot the series as a half-hour comedy. NBC's deal with 20th Century Fox had screenwriters and a director attached but no cast was attached as of 2013; NBC presumably cancelled the project.

== Home media ==
20th Century Fox has released all five seasons of Remington Steele on DVD in Region 1 in four box sets. The Season 1 DVD inadvertently echoed an ongoing joke in the series in that Stephanie Zimbalist, who had top billing when the show was on the air, was initially omitted from all promotional material connected with its release, as well as the DVD box itself, as Fox Video chose to promote Pierce Brosnan as the sole star. Subsequently, a sticker saying "Also starring Stephanie Zimbalist" was added to the packaging as an afterthought. This omission was corrected with the release of the second season which gave Zimbalist star billing with her photograph appearing on the box. Additionally, Zimbalist is featured on the behind-the-scenes featurettes contained therein. The first-season boxed set also has a picture of Doris Roberts on the back cover, even though she didn't join the show until the second season.

Season 1 has also been released in Region 2 & 4.

| DVD set | Episodes | Release date |
|---|---|---|
| Remington Steele: Season One | 22 | July 26, 2005 |
| Remington Steele: Season Two | 22 | November 8, 2005 |
| Remington Steele: Season Three | 22 | April 18, 2006 |
| Remington Steele: Seasons Four & Five | 28 | August 15, 2006 |

== Syndication ==
After a nearly two-decade absence from local syndication, the series returned to broadcast television and was seen from September 3 to December 31, 2012, on MeTV and resumed in September 2013. It also aired on Family Net. Reruns have previously aired on A&E from 1995 to 1997 and on PAX (now Ion Television) from 2000 to 2001. It also aired in India on Star Plus in the early 1990s to March 31, 1993.

MeTV ran the series starting 29 May 2017 in place of Diagnosis: Murder, beginning with the season 2 premiere, "Steele Away with Me". Decades Television ran the series as part of its weekend long Decades Binge Marathon the weekend of July 9 and 10, 2022.

In the United Kingdom, Freeview Channel 5USA, started showing the series from the first episode on October 30, 2017. In Germany, the series started on July 29, 1985, with the first episode in the first program and ended with the last episode on November 29, 1992, on ARD-TV.

MeTV+ began airing the series on 25 September 2023.

== See also ==
- Action comedy TV series
