= You Can't Run Away from It =

1956 film by Dick Powell

- Theatrical poster
- Directed by: Dick Powell
- Written by: Samuel Hopkins Adams (story); Robert Riskin (prev. screenplay); Claude Binyon (screenplay)
- Produced by: Dick Powell
- Starring: June Allyson; Jack Lemmon
- Cinematography: Charles Lawton Jr.
- Edited by: Al Clark
- Music by: Johnny Mercer, lyrics, and Gene de Paul, music (songs); George Duning (scoring)
- Production company: Columbia Pictures
- Distributed by: Columbia Pictures
- Release date: October 31, 1956
- Running time: 95 minutes
- Country: United States
- Language: English
- Box office: $1.45 million (US)

You Can't Run Away from It is a 1956 American musical comedy film directed and produced by Dick Powell and starring June Allyson and Jack Lemmon. The film is a remake of the 1934 Academy Award-winning film It Happened One Night. The supporting cast features Charles Bickford, Jim Backus, Stubby Kaye, Jack Albertson and Howard McNear. It Happened One Night had also been remade as a musical comedy in 1945 as Eve Knew Her Apples.

== Plot ==
Ellie Andrews is kidnapped by her father Texas cattleman A. A. Andrews after she has eloped with Jacques Ballarino, an international playboy. As her father attempts to annul the marriage, she jumps off her father's yacht in defiance. After she pawns her engagement ring, Ellie boards a Greyhound bus in San Diego en route to Houston, where she sits next to Peter Warne, an unemployed reporter. When the bus makes a stop in El Centro, California, a thief steals Ellie's suitcase, leaving her with only six dollars in hand. Despite Peter's insistence, Ellie decides not to report the theft.

The bus stops in Tucson, Arizona for breakfast, but when Ellie returns to the station, she learns the bus has left for Houston. Peter reads the headlines about Ellie's escape and stays behind to accompany her. They catch the evening bus that night. Ellie offers to pay Peter for her silence, but Peter sends a telegram to Joe Gordon, his former editor in Houston, offering to report the exclusive story about Ellie.

On the evening bus, Ellie initially sits next to Shapeley, who flirts with her until Peter says that he and Ellie are married. The bus is forced to stop for the night when a bridge washes out on the road, and Peter and Ellie rent a motel room together. There, Peter strings up a makeshift room divider between their respective beds, which he jokingly calls the "walls of Jericho".

Meanwhile, Mr. Andrews offers a $20,000 reward for Ellie's return, and hires detectives to have her pictures printed in the newspapers between Dallas and Houston. The next morning, Mr. Andrews's detectives arrive in their motel room, in which Ellie combs her hair down and has a faux argument with Peter. Convinced, the detectives leave. Peter and Ellie congratulate themselves with a dance until Peter learns about the reward. Believing the detectives are on the highway searching for Ellie, she and Peter decide not to board the bus and instead walk.

The next morning, Peter and Ellie hitchhike, in which Ellie succeeds on her first attempt by displaying her leg. Danker offers them a ride in his old jalopy. When they stop at the diner, Danker speeds off with Peter's suitcase. Peter chases after Danker and drives back to get Ellie. They stay at another motel for the night, where Ellie confesses her love for Peter but he rebuffs her advances at first.

In the early morning, Peter drives to Gordon's office alone to sell his story for $2,000, hoping to use the money to marry Ellie. Since Peter has ran off, the motel owners believe that Ellie is unmarried and evict her. A detective spots Ellie along the road as Peter drives back to the motel. At a railroad crossing, Peter sees Ellie inside Mr. Andrews's car, but his jalopy breaks down as he pursues them. Peter returns to Gordon's office and returns the money.

In Houston, Mr. Andrews arranges a formal wedding between Ellie and Jacques, but she confesses her love for Peter. However, she reconsiders to marry Jacques after Peter has reached out to Mr. Andrews. Later on, Peter arrives at the Andrews estate, and asks to be reimbursed for his expenses which total $37.75 ($464 in 2026). Mr. Andrews gets Peter to confess he loves Ellie.

At the wedding, as Mr. Andrews walks Ellie down the aisle, he explains that Peter did not claim the reward, but instead asked to be reimbursed as a matter of principle. Ellie leaves Jacques at the altar and marries Peter. They return to the motel and tear down the "walls of Jericho."

== Cast ==
- June Allyson as Ellie Andrews
- Jack Lemmon as Peter Warne
- Charles Bickford as A.A. Andrews
- Paul Gilbert as George Shapely
- Jim Backus as Danker
- Stubby Kaye as Fred Toten
- Allyn Joslyn as Joe Gordon, Editor
- Henny Youngman as First Driver
- Jacques Scott as Jacques 'Jack' Ballarino
- Walter Baldwin as 1st Proprietor
- The Four Aces as Vocal Quartette

== Reception ==
The Philadelphia Inquirer review was positive: “Columbia has dusted off the…short story about the runaway heiress and the antic newspaperman…embellished it with songs, June Allyson and Jack Lemmon and, with Dick Powell…as producer-director, tried for the brass ring again. Under its new title…our old friend is a charmer….Miss Allyson, pouting and pretty…rivals Miss Colbert’s memory….a commedienne at once deft and dainty….Lemmon isn’t exactly a Gable….But despite a tendency toward caricature of the sort Miss Allyson so firmly avoids, he is amusing and capable enough once past the opening scenes in which he is both intentionally and unintentionally annoying.”

The Washington Evening Star was complimentary as well: “Scenarists Claude Binyon and Robert Riskin have updated the story and sprinkled it liberally with fresh comedy. Lyricist Johnny Mercer and Composer Gene De Paul have give it some lilting songs. A cast pace by June Allyson and Jack Lemmon plays it lightly and for fun….Mr. Powell has woven the whole thing together with the deft touch of this sort of zay fable demands but doesn’t always get….Charles Bickford is first rate as the rich man whose daughter causes all of this [commotion]. It’s a captivating comedy, full of good cheer.”

== Soundtrack ==
Decca Records issued selections from the soundtrack on one side of an Lp Record, with music from other film scores on the reverse.

Selections include:

- "You Can't Run Away from It"
  Performed by The Four Aces
- "Howdy Friends and Neighbours"
  Performed by Stubby Kaye, June Allyson, and Jack Lemmon
- "Thumbin' a Ride"
  Performed by June Allyson and Jack Lemmon
- "Temporarily"
  Performed by June Allyson and Jack Lemmon
- "Scarecrow Ballet"
  Performed by Morris Stoloff conducting the Columbia Studio Orchestra

These selections were reissued on CD by Decca Broadway, paired with the Broadway cast album of Texas Li'l Darlin'.

== See also ==
- List of American films of 1956
