= Shirley Bonne =

American actress (born 1934)

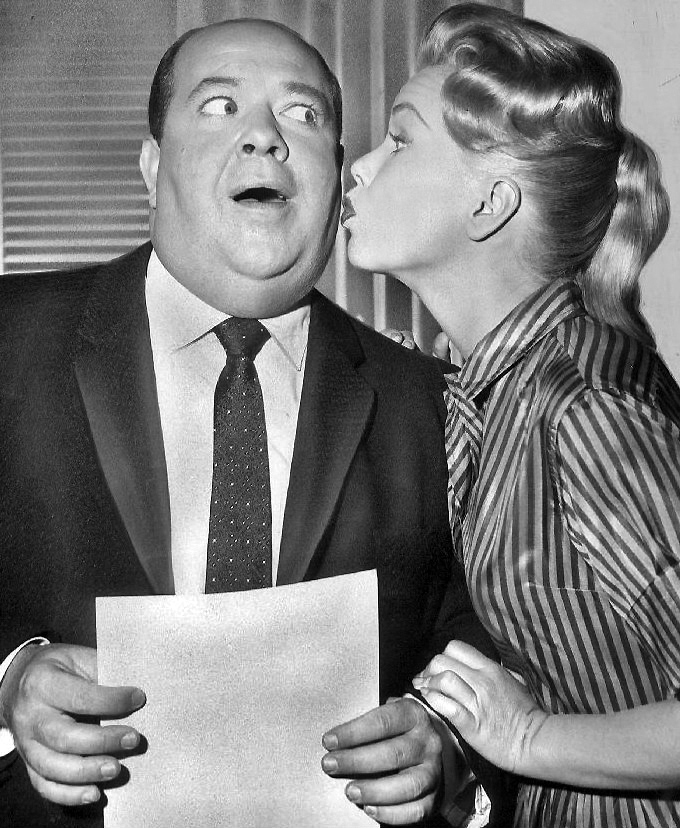
- Bonne (right) with Stubby Kaye in My Sister Eileen, 1960
- Born: Shirley Mae Tanner; May 22, 1934 (age 91); Los Angeles, California, U.S.
- Occupations: Film and television actress
- Years active: 1955–1970
- Spouses: Leonard John Bonanno (m. 1952; div. 195?); Ronald Herbert Freemond (m. 1959; div. 1973) Ron Dean Gilbreath (m. 1983; div. 1985)
- Children: 4

Shirley Bonne (born Shirley Mae Tanner; May 22, 1934) is an American former film and television actress. She is known for playing the title role in the American sitcom television series My Sister Eileen.

Bonne was born in Los Angeles, California, the daughter of Theodore Tanner. She began her screen career in 1955, appearing in an episode of the sitcom The People's Choice. She continued appearing in television programs, and had uncredited roles in films, until she was cast as Eileen Sherwood in the new CBS sitcom My Sister Eileen in 1960, replacing Anne Helm, who had played the role in the pilot episode.

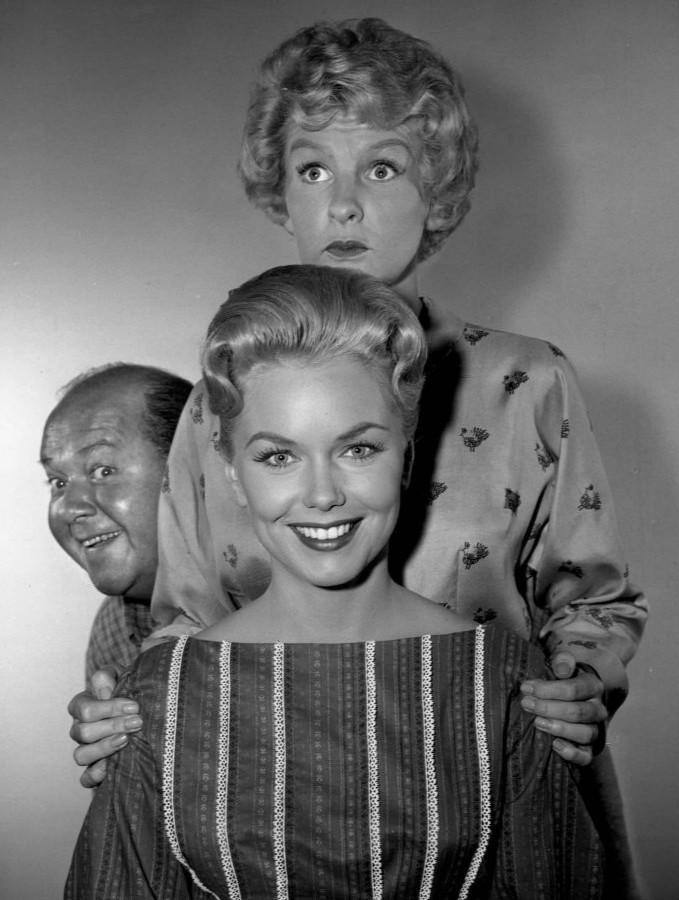
Bonne (center) with Stubby Kaye and Elaine Stritch in My Sister Eileen, 1961

Bonne guest-starred in other television programs, including Bonanza, Star Trek, Mr. Novak, Mannix, That Girl, The Joey Bishop Show and I Dream of Jeannie. Bonne retired to Palm Springs, California.
