= List of M Squad episodes =

This is a list of episodes for the television series M Squad.

== Series overview ==
Season	Episodes	Originally released	
Season	Episodes	First released	Last released
1	38	September 20, 1957	June 13, 1958
2	40	September 19, 1958	July 3, 1959
3	39	September 18, 1959	June 21, 1960

== Episodes ==
=== Season 1 (1957–58) ===
No. overall	No. in season	Title	Directed by	Written by	Original release date
1	1	"The Golden Look"	Bernard Girard	Joel Murcott	September 20, 1957
The Squad is on the lookout for a bank robbery suspect with a unique feature; witnesses said he has gold teeth.
2	2	"The Watchdog"	Robert Florey	Douglas Heyes	September 27, 1957
Ballinger and the Squad are out to catch a burglar who may have rabies.
3	3	"Neighborhood Killer"	Bernard Girard	William Holder & Stirling Silliphant	October 4, 1957
The squad hunts down a cop killer.
4	4	"Pete Loves Mary"	Bernard Girard	Harold Jack Bloom	October 11, 1957
The squad goes after a jail inmate who's just escaped.
5	5	"Face of Evil"	Don Weis	David Alexander & Bernard C. Schoenfeld	October 18, 1957
Ballinger investigates the murders of four women. The victims were all connected to the same church and lived within two miles of each other.
6	6	"Street of Fear"	Don Weis	Hendrik Vollaerts & Thomas Walsh	November 1, 1957
Ballinger goes undercover to break up a group of diamond smugglers.
7	7	"The Matinee Trade"	Bernard Girard	Palmer Thompson	November 8, 1957
Ballinger investigates illegal gambling, and a fellow police officer may be in on it.
8	8	"The Hard Case"	Bernard Girard	Paul David & Irving Rubine	November 15, 1957
Ballinger goes undercover in prison to find out from a jewelry store robber whether the night watchman was involved in the crime, as the robber had claimed, and what happened to the loot.
9	9	"Killer in Town"	Bernard Girard	Joel Murcott	November 22, 1957
A man, already sought for one murder, kills an off-duty police officer. The Squad's only clues are an old magazine and the killer's habit of saying "You bet."
10	10	"Diamond Hard"	Bernard Girard	Leo Gordon & Joel Murcott	November 29, 1957
Ballinger poses as a safe-cracker and murderer in order to help a woman stay honest.
11	11	"The Alibi Witness"	John Brahm	Jack Laird & Wilton Schiller	December 6, 1957
When perennial loser Wally Gardner is identified as the perpetrator of a robbery-murder, he tells police unique details of a stranger he met miles away at the time of the crime. But when that stranger is found, he says he can prove that he was miles from where Gardner says they met at the time of the crime. Ballinger must determine who's lying.
12	12	"The Specialists"	Earl Bellamy	William Driskill & Joel Rapp	December 13, 1957
When a hired gunman gets himself tossed in jail following a fistfight, Ballinger takes his place undercover as protection for a group of three businessmen who meet once a year to commit a specialized crime.
13	13	"Family Portrait"	John Peyser	Fenton Earnshaw & Larry Marcus	December 20, 1957
When his partner in an investigation is killed, Ballinger makes it a personal business to pin the crime on narcotics lord Sam Hinder. But, as Ballinger discovers, Hinder has an unusual reason for wanting to keep the police out of his own personal business.
14	14	"The Palace Guard"	Bernard Girard	Jack Laird & Wilton Schiller	December 27, 1957
Gangster Tommy Hatch is wanted for murder, but the police have to keep him safe from other gangsters who want him dead before he can testify against them. Ballinger is assigned to protect Hatch even though he despises him.
15	15	"The Slow Trap"	Earl Bellamy	Jack Laird & Wilton Schiller	January 3, 1958
Ballinger investigates the case of a security courier who is charged with robbing himself of $75,000.
16	16	"The Cover Up"	Edward Ludwig	Paul Gangelin & Frederick Nebel	January 10, 1958
District Attorney Grover calls for Ballinger to help him sort out a potentially embarrassing situation involving the murder of a former business associate.
17	17	"Blue Indigo"	John Brahm	Martin Berkeley, Clarke Reynolds & Allen Rivkin	January 17, 1958
The roommate of the third victim of the Blue Indigo serial killer may be the only link Ballinger has to catching him.
18	18	"The Long Ride"	David Lowell Rich	Merwin Gerard	January 24, 1958
When a convicted murderer gets the upper hand on Ballinger during a train ride back to Chicago, his last best hope for recapturing the felon is the persistence of an alert young boy.
19	19	"The Shakedown"	David Lowell Rich	Jack Laird & Wilton Schiller	January 31, 1958
Ballinger suspects an inside job when a dry cleaning company refuses to knuckle under to a shakedown mob.
20	20	"Dolly's Bar"	John Brahm	Lewis Reed	February 7, 1958
Kathy Bane, an old flame of Ballinger's, needs his help when a blackmailer trying to extort money turns up dead — in her apartment.
21	21	"Lover's Lane Killing"	Robert Altman	Joel Murcott	February 14, 1958
Ballinger investigates a murder with multiple motives.
22	22	"The Frightened Wife"	Don Taylor	Irving Rubine & Hendrik Vollaerts	February 21, 1958
A businessman disappears; someone confesses to killing him, but Ballinger is still suspicious.
23	23	"The Black Mermaid"	David Lowell Rich	James Edward Grant & Harry W. Junkin	February 28, 1958
Ballinger goes undercover to catch the ringleader of a gang.
24	24	"The Man in Hiding"	Don Taylor	Harry W. Junkin	March 7, 1958
A teacher is not who he seems to be.
25	25	"The Chicago Bluebeard"	David Lowell Rich	Donald H. Clark & Oscar Millard	March 14, 1958
Two members of a lonely hearts club are murdered.
26	26	"Girl Lost"	Richard Bartlett	David P. Harmon	March 21, 1958
An amnesia victim may hold the key to $250,000 in stolen money.
27	27	"Hideout"	John Brahm	Merwin Gerard	March 28, 1958
A bank robber holds a woman and her daughter hostage in their home. Frank poses as the woman's boyfriend to catch the robber.
28	28	"Shot in the Dark"	James Neilson	Merwin Gerard & Leonard Lee	April 4, 1958
Sniper shootings may not be random.
29	29	"The Twenty-Six Girl"	Don Taylor	Jack Laird & Wilton Schiller	April 11, 1958
A young wife is shot by an unknown assailant when she drives with her ex-con husband to an isolated woods in search of their dream home. No one even reports the couple missing until after the police find them dead in the snow. The wife's sister is a wealthy spinster, who takes her time even coming to Chicago, claiming her brother-in-law was threatened with death by a blackmailer. Ballinger suspects the sister knows more than she reveals.
30	30	"The Fight"	Don Taylor	Jack Laird & Wilton Schiller	April 18, 1958
Ballinger tries to help a boxer who is being threatened.
31	31	"Guilty Alibi"	Allen H. Miner	Harry W. Junkin & Norman Lessing	April 25, 1958
Ballinger is suspicious of a hit-and-run accident.
32	32	"The Healer"	Sidney Lanfield	Lawrence Menkin	May 2, 1958
Ballinger searches for a mentally ill young woman who shot a psychiatrist, hoping all the while that he can also find sufficient evidence to obtain a felony conviction against the charlatan who was "treating" her.
33	33	"Day of Terror"	Sidney Lanfield	Harry W. Junkin	May 9, 1958
A couple refuses to believe they are being extorted.
34	34	"The $20 Plates"	Allen H. Miner	Merwin Gerard	May 16, 1958
Counterfeit 20-dollar bills start showing up in Chicago.
35	35	"The Case of the Double Face"	Sidney Lanfield	Seeleg Lester & George Waggner	May 23, 1958
A robbery suspect may have a double.
36	36	"The System"	David Lowell Rich	Keith Hunter & Bernard C. Schoenfeld	May 30, 1958
Ballinger goes undercover to investigate an illegal gambling operation.
37	37	"The Woman from Paris"	John Brahm	Oscar Millard	June 6, 1958
A woman arrives from Paris and is found dead shortly afterward. Suicide is suspected, but Ballinger is not so sure.
38	38	"Accusation"	Don Taylor	Harry W. Junkin	June 13, 1958
Ballinger suspects a suicide is really murder.

=== Season 2 (1958–59) ===
No. overall	No. in season	Title	Directed by	Written by	Original release date
39	1	"More Deadly"	Don Medford	Sidney Marshall	September 19, 1958
A cashier embezzles money from her employer, then shoots a co-worker and a customer to make it look like someone else had committed the crime.
40	2	"Dead or Alive"	Don Taylor	Donald S. Sanford	September 26, 1958
A pair of gun-crazy kids are loose in Chicago, and a young reporter is defending them in the press against Ballinger and "police brutality."
41	3	"The Missing Claimant"	Allen H. Miner	Jack Laird & Wilton Schiller	October 3, 1958
A shady lawyer protects a false heir to a fortune by killing the real relative. Ballinger is called in to set everything straight.
42	4	"The Refugee"	James Neilson	Barry Trivers	October 10, 1958
Ballinger goes undercover as an immigrant worker to help break an extortion ring targeting foreigners.
43	5	"The Trap"	Don Medford	Donald S. Sanford	October 24, 1958
Danny Mitchell is trying to find an engagement ring for his girl when he's mistaken for a thief by the store owner. A fight convinces Danny that he's killed the old man, and now Danny's on the run. Ballinger is called in to find the kid before he gets into real trouble.
44	6	"Force of Habit"	Bernard L. Kowalski	Joel Murcott	October 31, 1958
Val Mooney, hiding out from the cops, sees the perfect opportunity to evade them; when his wife's brother is killed in a massive warehouse fire, he forces her to identify the body as Val Mooney.
45	7	"The Phantom Raiders"	Bernard L. Kowalski	Merwin Gerard	November 7, 1958
A pair of high-speed motorcycle thugs are robbing gas stations across Chicago. When one attendant gets shot, Ballinger goes undercover as a biker to crack the case.
46	8	"The Merits of the Case"	Don Medford	Jack Jacobs	November 14, 1958
A lawyer is killed, and the evidence points to a woman whose husband was unsuccessfully defended by the deceased.
47	9	"The Big Kill"	David Lowell Rich	Sidney Marshall	November 21, 1958
Ballinger is sure that he has the right man for a series of bank robberies, but doesn't have the evidence to back up his claim.
48	10	"The Sitters"	Boris Sagal	Barry Trivers & Warren Wilson	November 28, 1958
Unsuspecting women allow bookmakers to use their telephones in return for payment of $50 per week, but they later learn that their lives will be in danger if they try to get out of the agreement.
49	11	"The Executioner"	Bernard L. Kowalski	James Edmiston	December 5, 1958
A traffic cop is accused of attempted murder.
50	12	"The Widows"	Bernard L. Kowalski	Joel Murcott	December 12, 1958
Widows who have just collected insurance money are connected to a string of murders.
51	13	"Contraband"	Don Medford	Merwin Gerard	December 19, 1958
Smugglers may be using imported sports cars as a front.
52	14	"Prescription for Murder"	Mark Sandrich Jr.	Palmer Thompson	December 26, 1958
The wife of a brain surgeon is abducted and threatened with death if the surgeon goes ahead with an emergency operation to save a critically injured police witness that can implicate a loan shark in two murders.
53	15	"The Teacher" "Trade School"	Don Medford	Frank L. Moss	January 2, 1959
Ballinger looks to break up a gang of hoodlums running a protection racket at a trade school.
54	16	"The Third Shadow"	James Neilson	Jack Jacobs	January 9, 1959
A young policeman is accused of taking money during a bank robbery.
55	17	"One Man's Life"	Don Medford	Joel Murcott	January 23, 1959
An innocent man will be executed in 48 hours unless Ballinger can convince a socially prominent woman to recant the false testimony that she gave as a result of a ruthless blackmailer's threats.
56	18	"The Jumper"	Allen H. Miner	Joel Murcott	January 30, 1959
A suicidal suspect has information about a cop killing.
57	19	"The Last Act"	David Lowell Rich	Bill S. Ballinger & Donald S. Sanford	February 6, 1959
Ballinger must protect a beautiful actress when an attempt is made on her life.
58	20	"Mugger Murder"	Don Medford	Richard Deming & Robert C. Dennis	February 13, 1959
Ballinger poses as a victim to solve a case.
59	21	"The Star Witness"	David Lowell Rich	Leonard Kantor	February 20, 1959
The only witness to a murder didn't witness it at all.
60	22	"The Take Over"	Don Medford	Bill S. Ballinger & Jack Laird	February 27, 1959
Two rival gangs start a war over who will control a night club.
61	23	"Voluntary Surrender"	Virgil W. Vogel	Joel Murcott	March 6, 1959
A murder suspect has an alibi, but Ballinger is not so sure.
62	24	"Death Threat"	John Brahm	Jack Laird	March 13, 1959
A man who has sworn to kill Ballinger is released from prison.
63	25	"The Harpies"	Fletcher Markle	Robert C. Dennis	March 20, 1959
Ballinger investigates a murder of a businessman that has unusual circumstances about it.
64	26	"Ghost Town"	John Brahm	Jack Laird,& John Larkin, Boris Ingster & Lawrence Resner	March 27, 1959
A man killed in a police shoot-out is the only person who knows the location of a kidnapped girl. Bound, unattended, and hidden in a condemned building during a cruel Chicago winter, the young woman is in grave danger of dying from injury or exposure before she can be rescued.
65	27	"The Vanishing Lady"	Sidney Lanfield	Jack Jacobs	April 3, 1959
An anonymous murder witness has disappeared and it's up to Ballinger to find her.
66	28	"The Crush Out"	Virgil W. Vogel	Ric Hardman	April 10, 1959
While on an inspection of a prison, a senator is taken hostage.
67	29	"The Fire Makers"	Don Medford	Frank L. Moss	April 17, 1959
Ballinger is looking for an arsonist and gets a clue from an unlikely source.
68	30	"The Terror on Dark Street"	Sidney Lanfield	Jack Laird	April 24, 1959
Ballinger investigates a possible link between a series of Dark Street purse-snatchings and the disappearance of a successful but unhappily married architect.
69	31	"Robber's Roost"	Sidney Lanfield	Jack Jacobs	May 1, 1959
Ballinger gets a tip from a messenger that leads him to a hotel that harbors wanted criminals.
70	32	"The Baited Hook"	Mark Sandrich Jr.	Merwin Gerard	May 8, 1959
Ballinger investigates murder threats made against a father and his daughter.
71	33	"Model in the Lake"	David Lowell Rich	Robert J. Shaw	May 15, 1959
A swimsuit model is found dead in Lake Michigan, but physical evidence indicates that she may not have drowned while swimming. Ballinger becomes convinced that she was murdered after he learns that she was a strong swimmer and an iniquitous individual with a large number of unexplained bank deposits.
72	34	"The Outsider"	Don Taylor	Jack Laird & Wilton Schiller	May 22, 1959
A woman is in a diabetic coma, and it's up to Ballinger to find out who has switched her insulin with water.
73	35	"High School Bride"	John Brahm	Robert C. Dennis	May 29, 1959
A young man reports his new wife missing and it's up to Ballinger to find her.
74	36	"The Dangerous Game"	Bretaigne Windust	Joel Kane, Allen H. Miner & Frank L. Moss	June 5, 1959
The M Squad is called in after a brutal robbery at the Leslie Fur Salon leaves a man clinging to life. As the investigation progresses, the situation faced by M Squad becomes more and more complex.
75	37	"Decoy in White"	Sidney Lanfield	Robert Tallman	June 12, 1959
The M Squad become involved when a bank manager laundering illegal money is killed. The situation becomes tangled when a young lady accompanying the bank manager comes forward.
76	38	"Mr. Grim's Rabbits"	David Butler	Melvin Levy	June 19, 1959
A seemingly random dockside shooting leads M Squad on a strange investigation involving fur skins and ancient Inca artifacts.
77	39	"The Platter Pirates"	Dan Alexander	Robert C. Dennis & Jon Kubichan	June 26, 1959
A disc jockey threatens to reveal the influence of racketeers in the music industry. Before he can go to air with the information, he is gunned down. M squad are brought in to solve the mystery of the death as well as check the validity of the information he was going to reveal.
78	40	"Death Is a Clock"	Robert Ellis Miller	Hendrik Vollaerts	July 3, 1959
Paul Danzig is scheduled to die for a murder he doesn't remember committing. With just hours before his execution, he calls for the prison psychiatrist, hoping the doctor can help him recall.

=== Season 3 (1959–60) ===
No. overall	No. in season	Title	Directed by	Written by	Original release date
79	1	"Ten Minutes to Doomsday"	Don Medford	Stuart Jerome	September 18, 1959
Jonas Blecker, an embittered bank clerk who went to prison for dipping in the till to loan money to depositors down on their luck, wants to commemorate his first anniversary as a free man by killing the judge who gave him the maximum sentence. The judge is in Columbus Hospital for a delicate operation and he can't be moved, and M Squad hunts for a bomb before it blows up the hospital.
80	2	"The European Plan"	Francis D. Lyon	Robert C. Dennis	September 25, 1959
Young immigrant Elsa Bergsen who works as a maid is accused of killing her employer's wife.
81	3	"Sunday Punch"	Don Taylor	Joel Murcott	October 2, 1959
When a well-liked retired couple is found brutally murdered, evidence points to their curmudgeonly neighbor. Ballinger is initially skeptical of his story, but thorough investigation reveals that things are not always as they seem.
82	4	"Jeopardy by Fire"	Don McDougall	Stuart Jerome & Maxwell Shane	October 9, 1959
The M Squad is called in after a series of factory fires occur in the Chicago area. The case become complex after the unusual chemical signature of the fire accelerants is identified.
83	5	"Murder in C-Sharp Minor"	Herman Hoffman	Stuart Jerome & Arthur E. Orloff	October 16, 1959
A nightclub owner is found dead in his office by a waiter whom he'd fired earlier. The waiter's charged with murder, but he says he's innocent, having seen a bald man running away from the scene. The murder weapon, a stolen saxophone, is the clue to the killer's identity.
84	6	"The Human Bond"	Francis D. Lyon	Jack Jacobs	October 23, 1959
A bail bondsman's son is kidnapped to force his father to post an $80,000 bond for the release of a murderous extortionist. Ballinger finds himself on a dangerous high-speed boat chase when the culprit attempts to avoid trial, and a likely death sentence, by escaping to Canada.
85	7	"Mama's Boy"	Robert Ellis Miller	Arthur Rowe	October 30, 1959
Ballinger is called in after what seems to be a professional hit on a desk clerk at a hotel. A witness identifies who may have done the killing, but Ballinger is concerned he cannot find any connection for why the clerk should have been shot.
86	8	"Shred of Doubt"	Jerry Hopper	Earl Baldwin	November 6, 1959
Ballinger is called in to investigate when a burning car is found with the body of a young woman bound with wire inside. The chief suspect, playboy lawyer Paul Crater, seems to have an airtight alibi. Ballinger needs to cast his net wider to solve this mystery.
87	9	"Death by Adoption"	Murray Golden	Joel Murcott	November 20, 1959
Used car salesman Larry Colman has argument with Art Brunswick, a man who claims to be the father of Colman's daughter. Colman unearths evidence Brunswick is not who he claims to be, leading to a deadly altercation.
88	10	"Another Face, Another Life"	Sidney Lanfield	Stuart Jerome, Irwin Winehouse & A. Sanford Wolfe	November 27, 1959
Ballinger is part of an ongoing investigation into racketeering in the nightclub industry. After a fight breaks out in a club, Ballinger thinks he might have the break he's been looking for.
89	11	"Voice from the Grave"	Francis D. Lyon	Stuart Jerome, Irwin Winehouse & A. Sanford Wolfe	December 4, 1959
Truck driver Harry Conklin is killed while on the way to a secret Senate hearing into stand-over tactics in the trucking industry. Suspicion falls heavily on rival Martin Bodie. It's up to Ballinger to fight through the silence and uncover the truth.
90	12	"The Upset"	Herman Hoffman	Jerry Sohl	December 11, 1959
Danny Sutton is arrested. During the interview a rookie detective makes a mistake and Sutton gets access to a gun, and Ballinger finds himself caught in a tense hostage situation.
91	13	"One of Our Armored Cars Is Missing"	Herman Hoffman	Whitman Chambers	December 18, 1959
An armored car is hijacked during a pickup at a government installation. There are surprisingly few clues left behind by the criminals, and Ballinger needs to try and unravel the mystery.
92	14	"The Ivy League Bank Robbers"	Francis D. Lyon	Stuart Jerome & Maxwell Shane	December 25, 1959
Three college students rob a bank of $80,000 while it's being renovated. During their getaway, they run over a mother and her baby. It's clear to Ballinger they weren't professional mobsters after they send the injured woman $2,000 for her medical expenses.
93	15	"The Twisted Way"	Marc Lawrence	Adam Williams	January 1, 1960
The accusation of murder against Sandy Malone may not stick; he gets an airtight alibi from his girlfriend, who's a beloved actress with a sterling reputation.
94	16	"The Man Who Went Straight"	Francis D. Lyon	Stuart Jerome & Leonard Neubauer	January 8, 1960
Ballinger gets a tip from John Clavell that an old drug dealer, Manny Franchette, is coming back into town to re-establish his old network. Clavell wants no part of it, having decided to go straight.
95	17	"The Second Best Killer"	Robert B. Sinclair	Stuart Jerome & Maxwell Shane	January 15, 1960
Herbie Ryder gains fame for stopping a bank robbery. After a media interview he is shot and killed. Ballinger is brought in, in the belief that organized crime has ordered the hit.
96	18	"Pitched Battle at Bluebell Acres"	Earl Bellamy	Hendrik Vollaerts	January 22, 1960
Ballinger is brought in when a robbery and murder occurs at an armory. He's puzzled by the list of weapons stolen, including a bazooka and other heavy weapons. He knows they can't sell the weapons, so what is their plan?
97	19	"The Man Who Lost His Brain"	Francis D. Lyon	Hendrik Vollaerts	January 26, 1960
When an "electronic brain" worth $2,000,000 is stolen and held for ransom of $300,000, Captain Grey and Lieutenant Ballinger devise an elaborate ruse that they hope will lead them to the computer and the thieves.
98	20	"A Debt of Honor"	Herman Hoffman	Whitman Chambers & Arthur Rowe	February 2, 1960
During a crack-down on Chicago crime, Bugsy Page makes threats against Attorney General Russel Madison. Ballinger needs to decide if the threats are real or simply an attempt to throw the man off.
99	21	"The Man with Frank's Face"	Don Taylor	Stuart Jerome	February 9, 1960
A European smuggler who's the spitting image of Frank Ballinger lies dying in a Chicago hospital bed. He was in the country to buy some U.S. currency plates when he was hit by a truck. The Feds want Ballanger to assume the man's identity so they can grab the counterfeiters selling the plates.
100	22	"Burglar's Nightmare"	Herman Hoffman	Scott Flohr	February 16, 1960
A trio of bank robbers try to blow a safe. It all goes wrong and one of the criminals is killed in the explosion. Ballinger thinks there is a connection between other bank vault jobs in the area. He uses a tip from a robber's wife to catch him.
101	23	"Needle in a Haystack"	Herman Hoffman	Hendrik Vollaerts	February 23, 1960
Lanny Cord escapes from a court room and disappears. Ballinger is interested in the case because he'd originally arrested Cord, and Cord had always sworn to kill Ballinger if he had the opportunity.
102	24	"Race to Death"	Jerry Hopper	Whitman Chambers	March 1, 1960
British racing car driver Morrison is killed in a local race. The driver's chief mechanic presents evidence to M Squad that indicates the car may have been tampered with before the accident.
103	25	"The Velvet Stakeout"	William Witney	Stuart Jerome & Maxwell Shane	March 8, 1960
Conrad Brenner is found dead in an apparent suicide. As Ballinger continues the investigation it becomes evident that Brenner was actually murdered; when a personal diary can't be found, Ballinger realizes the truth of the case.
104	26	"Anything for Joe"	Paul Stewart	Maxwell Shane & Harold Swanton	March 15, 1960
After a narcotics robbery, Ballinger makes an arrest, but is concerned that the collar was too easy. Everything about the arrested person doesn't seem to add up, and Ballinger pushes hard for answers.
105	27	"A Kid Up There"	Paul Stewart	Ian Hamilton & Maxwell Shane	March 22, 1960
Frank Ballinger becomes involved in a tense hostage situation; he must restrain his instinct to simply shoot it out because of fears there may be a young child involved.
106	28	"Diary of a Bomber"	Jerry Hopper	Adam Williams	March 29, 1960
Ballinger is on a case involving threats against a visiting prince to Chicago. No one is taking the situation too seriously until a little girl accidentally finds the detonating device for a homemade bomb.
107	29	"Let There Be Light"	Paul Stewart	Frank Fox & Bob Mitchell	April 5, 1960
During a robbery one of the criminals is hit in the eye and blinded. Ballinger has a fair idea who is behind the crime. Urgency increases when news comes through that an eye specialist has been kidnapped.
108	30	"A Gun for Mother's Day"	Herman Hoffman	Jay D. Crowley & John Robinson	April 12, 1960
Ballinger is looking for a mother who used a gun to break her son out of jail and killed a cop in the process.
109	31	"Man with the Ice"	Marc Lawrence	Kevin Thomas	April 19, 1960
Ballinger is working a jewelry theft when he becomes convinced that one of thieves is a clean skin amateur. He realizes that by putting pressure on this individual he has a chance to crack the entire racket open.
110	32	"Dead Parrots Don't Talk"	Don McDougall	Frank Burt & Robert Quaid	May 3, 1960
A penny arcade owner is robbed and murdered. Suspicion falls on a local peddler, but Ballinger thinks there is more to this case than anyone is admitting. He get tips to help solve the murder from an unlikely source.
111	33	"A Grenade for a Summer's Evening"	Herman Hoffman	Terry Crosby	May 10, 1960
Billinger has to find the person who tossed a hand grenade into the middle of a backyard party killing several people.
112	34	"Two Days for Willy"	Don McDougall	Terry Crosby & Dennis Roberts	May 17, 1960
Willy Nichols is due to testify in a narcotics investigation, but under police protection he receives a threatening phone call and suddenly disappears. Ballinger must find Nichols to save the case.
113	35	"Badge for a Coward"	Paul Stewart	Jay D. Crowley, Ward Hawkins & Robert Quaid	May 24, 1960
Accompanied by a female reporter, Lieutenant Ballinger investigates an elderly woman's charge that the man who robbed her store and killed a police officer was able to escape as a direct result of Officer George Maxwell's cowardice.
114	36	"Closed Season"	Herman Hoffman	Terry Crosby, Lee Erwin & William McCluskey	May 31, 1960
Sonny Bradley is charged with murder. Ballinger begins to investigate and quickly realizes something is not right about the statements from the witnesses, and starts to see a much bigger game being played.
115	37	"Fire in the Sky"	Dann Cahn	Robert Quaid	June 7, 1960
A private plane explodes just after takeoff, killing ten people. Evidence begins to indicate that it wasn't an accident. Ballinger begins to follow the trail and starts to discover a complicated insurance scam in action.
116	38	"The Tiger's Cage"	Don McDougall	Stuart Jerome & Maxwell Shane	June 14, 1960
A bookkeeper is robbed and murdered at a circus. A clown named Laslo is identified as the killer. Ballinger and the rest of M Squad have to deal with how Laslo could have committed the crime while performing in front of 5,000 people in the main tent.
117	39	"The Bad Apple"	Paul Stewart	Jay D. Crowley, Fenton Earnshaw & Kevin Thomas	June 21, 1960
Ballinger and M Squad are called in to investigate a diamond robbery. All the evidence points to an inside job, and M Squad have the tough task of working out who was the inside connection.
