= List of Remington Steele episodes =

The following is a list of episodes for the television show Remington Steele; included are the many film references made throughout the series.

== Series overview ==
Season	Episodes	Originally released	
Season	Episodes	First released	Last released
1	22	October 1, 1982	April 12, 1983
2	22	September 20, 1983	May 22, 1984
3	22	September 25, 1984	May 14, 1985
4	22	September 24, 1985	May 10, 1986
5	6	January 5, 1987	February 17, 1987

== Episodes ==
=== Season 1 (1982–83) ===
No. overall	No. in season	Title	Directed by	Written by	Original release date	Prod. code	U.S. viewers (millions)
1	1	"License to Steele"	Robert Butler	Michael Gleason	October 1, 1982	2704	N/A
A client who hired Remington Steele Investigations to protect a shipment of rare jewels insisted that Steele himself oversee the operation. A duplicitous individual, who was hanging around looking for profitable opportunities, well-knowingly steps into the role of Remington Steele against Laura Holt's wishes. The gems involved, the royal lavulite, had recently been discovered. This episode was shot after the original pilot, to offer details on the backstory. GUEST STARS: Joseph Hacker, Philip Casnoff, Robert Darnell, John Francis Film reference: Tea and Sympathy, North by Northwest (obliquely). Plus, via Steele's choice of passport aliases: Dark Victory, They Drive by Night, Casablanca, Passage to Marseille, and Across the Pacific.
2	2	"Tempered Steele"	Robert Butler	Michael Gleason	October 8, 1982	0903	N/A
Laura tackles a case of industrial espionage in a family-owned business while Steele enlists an old pal to help him install a burglar alarm, but when the house is burglarized and Steele's friend murdered it becomes personal. GUEST STARS: Arlen Dean Snyder, David Hayward, Diana Douglas, Brenda King, Curt Lowens; Film references: Casablanca, The Thin Man. Note: This was the pilot episode.
3	3	"Steele Waters Run Deep"	Jeff Bleckner	Lee David Zlotoff (Note: Lee David Zlotoff is credited as Lee Zlotoff in seasons 1 and 2.)	October 22, 1982	2703	N/A
A video game genius disappears just before a merger, with five million dollars and the plans for his company's latest video game. GUEST STARS: Peter Scolari, George Wallace, Betty Kennedy, Roxanne Hart, Rae Allen, Blake Clark Film reference: North by Northwest.
4	4	"Signed, Steeled, & Delivered"	Robert Butler	Glenn Gordon Caron	October 29, 1982	2702	N/A
Laura and Steele spend the weekend trying to keep a CIA researcher alive and on time for his wedding. GUEST STARS: Thom Bray, Philip Sterling, Alexandra Johnson, Christopher Lofton, Buddy Powell Film references: The In-Laws (obliquely)
5	5	"Thou Shalt Not Steele"	Leo Penn	Lee David Zlotoff	November 5, 1982	2706	N/A
A woman from Steele's past asks him to help her steal a valuable painting that Laura has already agreed to protect (and that he had stolen once already), while Laura also has to deal with her visiting mother. GUEST STARS: Beverly Garland, Cassandra Harris, James Blendick, Peter MacLean, Kurt Christian, Benjamin Slack, Ben Mittleman Film references: The Maltese Falcon (obliquely)
6	6	"Steele Belted"	Robert Butler	Michael Gleason	November 12, 1982	2701	N/A
A loser asks the agency to help him, but his alibi witness is found dead in Steele's apartment and his lawyer seems more interested in Laura than in the case, which for once forces Steele and Murphy to work together. GUEST STARS: Andrew Bloch, Barry Van Dyke, Raymond Singer, Ilene Graff, Lora Staley, Ernest Emling Film reference: D.O.A..
7	7	"Etched in Steele"	Stan Lathan	Glenn Gordon Caron	November 19, 1982	2707	N/A
A popular author's steamy books mirror her own life, including the murder of her husband. GUEST STARS: Shannon Wilcox, George Morfogen, Richard Cox, Joel Colodner, Lyman Ward Film reference: The Shining.
8	8	"Your Steele the One for Me"	Thomas Carter	Lee David Zlotoff	November 26, 1982	2709	N/A
While trying to solve a murder case, Laura and Steele clash with the Yakuza. GUEST STARS: Keye Luke, Marc Hayashi, Sab Shimono, Reid Shelton, Emily Kuroda, Richard Stanley, Stephen Lee. Film references: Enter the Dragon, The Yakuza, The Third Man, Charade.
9	9	"In the Steele of the Night"	Burt Brinckerhoff	Joel Steiger	December 3, 1982	2708	N/A
Laura's former boss is murdered during a reunion of her former colleagues. GUEST STARS: Carlene Watkins, Philip Charles Mackenzie, Arthur Rosenberg, Jeff Pomerantz Film reference: Witness for the Prosecution
10	10	"Steele Trap"	Sidney Hayers	Michael Gleason	December 10, 1982	2710	N/A
To find out why a client committed suicide, Laura and Steele go undercover to an island party, where people are being murdered one by one. GUEST STARS: Lynne Randall, Paul Hecht, Bruce Kirby, Brandis Kemp, Diane Stilwell. Film references: Citizen Kane, One Flew Over the Cuckoo's Nest, And Then There Were None, The Philadelphia Story.
11	11	"Steeling the Show"	Seymour Robbie	Peter Lefcourt	January 7, 1983	2713	N/A
An aging B-movie actress believes that someone is trying to kill her, and only Steele believes her. GUEST STARS: Bibi Osterwald, Frances Lee McCain, Peter Jurasik. Film reference: Psycho.
12	12	"Steele Flying High"	Nick Havinga	Richard Collins	January 14, 1983	2711	N/A
Steele gets involved with the murder of a naturalist when he serves on a committee to save the bald eagle. GUEST STARS: Francine Lembi, Michael Goodwin, Michael McGuire. Film references: The Big Sleep, Chinatown, The Maltese Falcon, Murder Most Foul.
13	13	"A Good Night's Steele"	Seymour Robbie	R.J. Stewart & Lee David Zlotoff	January 21, 1983	2712	N/A
Steele poses as an insomniac in order to find a murderer in a sleep disorder clinic. Paul Reiser guest stars. Film references: The Big Sleep, Coma.
14	14	"Hearts of Steele"	Robert Butler	Story by : Charles Rosin; Teleplay by : Glenn Gordon Caron	January 28, 1983	2705	N/A
The detectives pose as a bickering couple while investigating attempts on a divorce attorney's life. GUEST STARS: Mark Hutter, Susan Kellermann, Linda Carlson, Caren Kaye, Alexandra Borrie, Mary-Joan Negro. Film references: Casablanca, Murder on the Orient Express, Notorious.
15	15	"To Stop a Steele"	Sidney Hayers	Glenn Gordon Caron	February 11, 1983	2721	12.00
Laura and Steele wind up working for opposite sides of a jewelry theft when the frightened thief looks for help when someone else beats him to the jewel. GUEST STARS: Cliff Norton, Michael C. Gwynne. Film references: The Thomas Crown Affair, To Catch a Thief.
16	16	"Steele Crazy After All These Years"	Don Weis	Story by : Peggy Goldman and R.J. Stewart & Andrew Laskos; Teleplay by : R.J. Stewart & Andrew Laskos	February 18, 1983	2715	15.10
Murphy's college homecoming is marred by a murder that awakens memories of a bombing on campus ten years before. GUEST STARS: Annie Potts, Todd Susman, Allyce Beasley, Tony Plana, Sharon Stone. (Note: Sharon Stone's name appears in the closing credits as a guest star.) Film references: The Third Man, The Uninvited
17	17	"Steele Among the Living"	Nick Havinga	Andrew Laskos	February 25, 1983	2718	N/A
Laura searches for a vanished artist whose works have suddenly appreciated in value, for both her husband and the owner of an art gallery. STARS: Phil Rubenstein, Marilyn Jones, Reid Smith. Film references: It's a Mad, Mad, Mad, Mad World and Laura.
18	18	"Steele in the News"	Burt Brinckerhoff	Story by : Fred Lyle & Duncan Smith; Teleplay by : Michael Gleason and Fred Lyle & Duncan Smith	March 4, 1983	2717	15.10
The detectives try to solve a case of sabotage and murder on the set of a television news program. GUEST STARS: J. D. Cannon, John Reilly, Maggie Roswell, Ron Frazier, Jenny O'Hara, Tracy Scoggins, Macon McCalman. Film references: Foreign Correspondent, Peyton Place, Network.
19	19	"Vintage Steele"	Larry Elikann	Susan Baskin	March 15, 1983	2716	16.00
Laura's former flame asks her help when he discovers a corpse in the trunk of his car, a corpse that keeps returning as they check out a winery he's involved with. Film references: The Trouble with Harry, Rasputin and the Empress, and Bud Abbott and Lou Costello.
20	20	"Steele's Gold"	Burt Brinckerhoff	R.J. Stewart	March 22, 1983	2723	15.10
A prospector's journal stolen during a party leads Laura and Steele on a wild gold hunt through the desert. Film references: Metropolis, The Treasure of the Sierra Madre.
21	21	"Sting of Steele"	Seymour Robbie	Gary Kott	April 5, 1983	2722	N/A
Daniel Chalmers, Steele's mentor back in the days when Steele was a rogue, comes to California to ask for Steele's help in dealing with a vindictive crook and winds up romancing Laura's mother. GUEST STARS: Beverly Garland, John Orchard, Efrem Zimbalist Jr. NOTE: This episode reveals the name in which Remington Steele was previously known by, Harry Chalmers. His true name is never revealed in the series. Film references: The Sting, Thirty Seconds Over Tokyo.
22	22	"Steele in Circulation"	Don Weis	Lee David Zlotoff	April 12, 1983	2724	15.20
After preventing a man from committing suicide, Steele tries to find out who had tricked the man into stealing over two million dollars. GUEST STARS: John Doolittle, Gina Gallego, Richard Kuss, Patsy Pease. Film references: Anna Karenina, Gaslight, The Music Lovers, Pennies from Heaven, A Star Is Born.

=== Season 2 (1983–84) ===
No. overall	No. in season	Title	Directed by	Written by	Original release date	Prod. code	U.S. viewers (millions)
23	1	"Steele Away with Me"	Seymour Robbie	Michael Gleason	September 20, 1983	3709	20.00
24	2	"Steele Away with Me"	Seymour Robbie	Michael Gleason	September 20, 1983	3709	20.00
In this two-part episode, Steele and Laura go after diamond smugglers in Acapulco. Associate detective Murphy Michaels and secretary Bernice Fox have left the agency, while Mildred Krebs (Doris Roberts), an IRS agent hot on Steele's tail, ends up teaming with Laura and Steele. GUEST STARS: Vincent Baggetta, Ray Girardin, Jack Blessing, Pedro Armendáriz Jr., David Warner. Film references: Bride of Frankenstein, The Maltese Falcon, Casablanca, Key Largo, Notorious.
25	3	"Red Holt Steele"	Kevin Conner	Lee David Zlotoff	September 27, 1983	3710	18.80
Holt and Steele are hired by a woman who thinks someone is trying to destroy her late husband's aircraft company. GUEST STARS: Barbara Cason, Joel Polis, Audrie J. Neenan, Lewis Arquette. Film reference: It Happened One Night.
26	4	"Altared Steele"	Alexander Singer	Jeff Melvoin	October 11, 1983	3702	18.40
The detectives try to find out which one of an amnesiac's five wives is trying to kill him. GUEST STARS: Fred McCarren, Monique van de Ven, Delta Burke, Jane Kaczmarek, Carole Ita White, Clara Perryman, Sam Anderson. Film reference: Mirage, Robin Hood, Sands of Iwo Jima, Spellbound.
27	5	"Steele Framed"	Sheldon Larry	Brian Alan Lane	October 18, 1983	3708	19.40
Someone is trying to frame Steele for murder. GUEST STARS: Guy Boyd, Gary Frank, Archie Hahn.
28	6	"A Steele at Any Price"	Don Weis	Story by : Mitch Paradise; Teleplay by : Mitch Paradise & Richard DeRoy	November 1, 1983	3706	16.40
Steele re-introduces Laura to the thrill of thievery during a case involving stolen paintings. GUEST STARS: Michael Cornelison, Jeffrey Jones, Susan Bay, Stefan Gierasch, Gillian Eaton, Ernest Harada. Film references: Charade, The Sting.
29	7	"Love Among the Steele"	Seymour Robbie	Lee David Zlotoff	November 8, 1983	3716	16.30
The detectives find themselves in the middle of a mystery involving all the previous owners of a vintage car. GUEST STARS: Clive Revill, Susan French, Peter Hobbs, Al Ruscio. Film references: Splendor in the Grass, Tom Jones, The Yellow Rolls-Royce.
30	8	"Scene Steelers"	Peter Medak	Story by : Joyce Armor & Judie Neer; Teleplay by : Joyce Armor & Judie Neer & Michael Gleason	November 15, 1983	3703	15.90
Steele and Laura investigate attempted murder on the set of a frozen-food commercial. GUEST STARS: Barrie Ingham, Bibi Besch, Gwen Humble, Paul Kreppel, Faith Prince.
31	9	"Steele Knuckles and Glass Jaws"	Don Weis	Jeff Melvoin	November 29, 1983	3717	11.20
A mysterious baby plays a central part in a case involving gangsters and professional boxing that draws upon Steele's past as "The Kilkenny Kid". Steele is heard to sing softly "Oh, me name is MacNamara, I'm the leader of the band". GUEST STARS: Bert Remsen, Paul Stewart, Ken Foree, Julie Carmen, George McDaniel, Len Lesser. Film reference: Little Caesar.
32	10	"My Fair Steele"	Seymour Robbie	Brian Alan Lane	December 6, 1983	3714	20.70
The detectives try to find a kidnapped heiress with the help of her previously unknown twin sister. GUEST STARS: Stephen Elliott, Ann Dusenberry, Joanna Barnes, Thomas Hill, Judith Chapman, Ian Wolfe. Film references: Pygmalion, My Fair Lady.
33	11	"Steele Threads"	Karen Arthur	George Lee Marshall	December 13, 1983	3711	17.10
A guy illegally snaps pictures of a fashion designer's latest works, and hides the film in a custom-tailored jacket done by the designer's estranged brother. However, another person intercepts and murders the courier to claim the jacket. GUEST STARS: Joshua Shelley, Lara Parker, Dean Santoro, John van Dreelen, Carl Weintraub.
34	12	"Steele Eligible"	Sheldon Larry	Story by : Larry Konner; Teleplay by : Michael Gleason & Larry Konner	January 10, 1984	3719	16.60
Steele is selected for a magazine campaign's "five most eligible bachelors" but during the festivities, the bachelors are being killed off one by one. GUEST STARS: Roy Dotrice, Mimi Kuzyk, D. D. Howard, Frank Luz, Richard Backus. Film reference: Rear Window, The A.B.C. Murders (obliquely) (Note: In the episode "Steele Eligible", when Steele refers to The A.B.C. Murders, he erroneously assumes there was no film adaptation, although there was a film adaptation called The Alphabet Murders released in 1965 by MGM)
35	13	"High Flying Steele"	Karen Arthur	George Lee Marshall	January 17, 1984	3718	15.30
Mildred's guilty pleasure in a sleazy circus séance draws Laura and Steele into an investigation of an old circus "accident" where they join in as trapeze artists. GUEST STARS: Lisa Pelikan, Michael McGuire, A Martinez, Joy Garrett, Jessie Lawrence Ferguson.
36	14	"Blood Is Thicker Than Steele"	Barbara Peters	Richard DeRoy	January 31, 1984	3712	16.60
Laura and Steele must protect the rather obnoxious children of a Federal witness by taking them on a road trip to Arizona. GUEST STARS: Eric Brown, Carolyn Seymour, Bridgette Andersen, Jack Betts, Ted LePlat. Film references: The Bad Seed, The Gauntlet, Stagecoach.
37	15	"Steele Sweet on You"	Don Weis	Susan Baskin	February 7, 1984	3707	21.40
Laura's sister Frances suspects her husband Donald is cheating on her at a dental convention. But things get complicated when Steele is not informed of the situation, and the secretary and Donald's associate is murdered. GUEST STARS: Maryedith Burrell, Michael Durrell, Patrick Collins, James O'Sullivan. Film references: Boom Town, The Lost Weekend, The Man Who Knew Too Much.
38	16	"Elegy in Steele"	Kevin Connor	Brian Alan Lane	February 21, 1984	3720	12.70
Major Descoine (Guy Boyd) the villain from the episode "Steele Framed" (No. 27) returns and promises that Laura and Steele will die within an hour. GUEST STARS: Guy Boyd, Quinn Cummings, Michael Fairman, Peter Jason. Film references: The Major and the Minor, Neptune's Daughter.
39	17	"Small Town Steele"	Seymour Robbie	Jeff Melvoin	February 28, 1984	3721	13.60
Laura and Steele go to a small town to investigate the disappearance of an author who was doing research on the area and apparently found something he shouldn't have. GUEST STARS: Paul Gleason, Ben Slack, Jacques Aubuchon, Carolyn Coates, Ford Rainey. Film references: Bad Day at Black Rock, In the Heat of the Night.
40	18	"Molten Steele"	Christopher Hibler	Richard Collins	March 6, 1984	3715	13.90
Laura and Steele help a woman who has been constantly receiving obscene phone calls, but the suspected placer of the sexual personals ad is soon found murdered. GUEST STARS: Pippa Scott, Bill Morey, Ellen Regan, John Bedford Lloyd, Ellen Tobie, Andrea Moar. Film reference: Peyton Place.
41	19	"Dreams of Steele"	Don Weis	Brian Alan Lane	March 20, 1984	3726	16.20
The reputation of the agency is at stake again when the gems that first brought them together are switched with fakes as Laura and Steele are transporting them. GUEST STARS: Judith Light, Woodrow Parfrey, Jack Gwillim, Robert Harper. Film reference: Ocean's Eleven.
42	20	"Woman of Steele"	Christopher Hibler	Susan Baskin	March 27, 1984	3724	16.00
A woman from Steele's past arranges for the agency to handle the security on an exhibition at an art museum, and contacts Steele with a desperate plea for help. GUEST STARS: Cassandra Harris, James Laurenson, Christopher Stone, Eve Roberts. Film references: Obsession, Vertigo.
43	21	"Hounded Steele"	Don Weis	Jeff Melvoin	May 15, 1984	3727	16.20
Mildred rescues an abducted dog and brings it to the office. When the pursuer takes the dog back at gunpoint, Laura and Steele track the pursuer, but find he was killed and was carrying an Interpol badge. They discover the owner is actually a famous jewel thief named Le Renard. Mildred is abducted. Steele, Holt, and Le Renard must break into the gem exchange to retrieve the gem in exchange for Mildred's life. GUEST STARS: J. D. Cannon, Tom Baker, Nita Talbot, Sarah Marshall, Doris Belack, Freddie Weber, Paddi Edwards. Film reference: Old Yeller. Note: Tom Baker is famous for portraying the Fourth Doctor on the BBC science-fiction television series Doctor Who.
44	22	"Elementary Steele"	Seymour Robbie	Michael Gleason	May 22, 1984	3705	13.50
Someone is using mystery buffs portraying Sherlock Holmes, Dr. Watson, Miss Marple, and Mr. Moto to solve a make-believe case to find a murderous embezzler. GUEST STARS: Lynne Randall, Peter Evans, Keone Young, Barry Jenner, David Garrison, Pearl Shear. Film references: The Big Sleep, Death Race 2000.

=== Season 3 (1984–85) ===
No. overall	No. in season	Title	Directed by	Written by	Original release date	Prod. code	U.S. viewers (millions)
45	1	"Steele at It"	Don Weis	Jeff Melvoin	September 25, 1984	4707	14.80
Laura is ready for romance as she goes on a vacation on the French Riviera accompanied by Remington Steele, but old friends needing his help in stealing a dagger distract Steele. GUEST STARS: André Maranne, Jacques Maury, Mark Burns, Marianne Lawrence, Bob Sherman, Claude le Saché. Film references: Beau Geste, Goldfinger, The Maltese Falcon, To Catch a Thief.
46	2	"Lofty Steele"	Burt Brinckerhoff	Brad Kern	October 2, 1984	4703	17.50
A shady building manager tries to convince Laura to move out of her apartment just as she's on the verge of uncovering a corporate embezzlement plot. GUEST STARS: Gregg Henry, Joe Lambie, Ron O'Neal, Armin Shimerman, James David Hinton. Film references: The Great Escape, Moby Dick (multiple versions).
47	3	"Maltese Steele"	Seymour Robbie	John Wirth	October 16, 1984	4713	17.60
Laura and Steele search for a missing body on the island of Malta, but find an insignificant piece of brass that could get them killed. GUEST STARS: Susan Penhaligon, Frederick Jaeger, John Malcolm, Derek Benfield, Ian Tyler, Bruce Boa. Film references: The Maltese Falcon, The Third Man.
48	4	"Second Base Steele"	Don Weis	Rick Mittleman	October 23, 1984	4705	19.50
A reunion of high-school athletes at an adult baseball camp is marred by a series of "accidents" that Laura and Steele are hired to investigate; Mickey Mantle and Whitey Ford guest-star. Other guests: Louis Giambalvo, Michael McManus, Marco St. John, Lionel Smith, Patricia McCormack, Elizabeth Baur. Film references: The Alphabet Murders, And Then There Were None, Fear Strikes Out, The Pride of the Yankees, That Championship Season.
49	5	"Blue Blooded Steele"	Burt Brinckerhoff	Story by : Brady Westwater & John Pashdag; Teleplay by : John Wirth & Brady Westwater & John Pashdag	October 30, 1984	4701	15.70
Daniel Chalmers enters Steele's life again when it appears that he is about to inherit an English title, its fortune and some enemies. GUEST STARS: Merete Van Kamp, David Byrd, Irene Tedrow, Maurice Roeves, Efrem Zimbalist Jr. Film reference: The Fuller Brush Man.
50	6	"Steele Your Heart Away"	Seymour Robbie	Brian Clemens	November 13, 1984	4711	15.60
Laura flies off to help an amnesiac Steele recall why he came to Ireland and why someone is trying to kill him. GUEST STARS: Marie Conmee, Chris O'Neill, Frank Kelly, Tom Jordan; Film references: Casablanca, Citizen Kane, A Day at the Races, From Russia with Love, Gone with the Wind, Laura, The 39 Steps, Wait Until Dark.
51	7	"A Pocketful of Steele"	Harry Harris	Brad Kern	November 20, 1984	4721	15.80
Steele tries to help a street-wise kid who picks his pocket and grabs evidence that a loan shark will do anything to retrieve. Film reference: Boys Town, The Big Sleep (obliquely).
52	8	"Puzzled Steele"	Don Weis	Story by : Jeff Melvoin & Dennis Spooner & Brian Clemens; Teleplay by : Jeff Melvoin	November 27, 1984	4712	17.10
Laura and Steele accept the invitation of an eccentric millionaire to compete in finding a missing journalist but the game soon turns deadly. Film reference: The Wizard of Oz.
53	9	"Cast in Steele"	Harry Harris	Jeff Melvoin	December 4, 1984	4720	17.60
Three aging film stars — Virginia Mayo, Dorothy Lamour, and Lloyd Nolan as themselves — hire Steele and Laura to find out who is behind their curious fan mail and the attempts on their lives. Film references: Dirty Harry, The Fan, The Godfather, Johnny Apollo, The Maltese Falcon, Moon Over Burma, The Postman Always Rings Twice, Road to Singapore, St. Louis Blues, The Secret Life of Walter Mitty, Somewhere in the Night, Three Days of the Condor, Typhoon, White Heat.
54	10	"Breath of Steele"	Don Weis	John Wirth	December 11, 1984	4702	19.40
Laura and Steele try to protect two singing-telegram girls who witnessed a murder while they also hunt for the killers. Film reference: Little Murders.
55	11	"Let's Steele a Plot"	Christopher Hibler	Joe Gores & Richard DeRoy	December 18, 1984	4704	18.60
Laura and Steele get lots of advice and help when they investigate the embezzlement of a mystery-writers guild's treasury. Film references: Arsenic and Old Lace, Jaws.
56	12	"Gourmet Steele"	Burt Brinckerhoff	Bob Shayne	January 8, 1985	4716	16.70
Steele inadvertently goes undercover as the restaurant critic they've been hired to find, and who has incensed several restaurant owners with his blistering reviews. Film reference: The Thin Man.
57	13	"Stronger Than Steele"	Stan Lathan	John J. Sakmar & Kerry Lenhart	January 15, 1985	4718	18.50
Laura has a personal stake in the investigation of the death of a movie producer who was planning on making a movie of an old TV series without the original star. Film references: Gone with the Wind, Heaven's Gate.
58	14	"Have I Got a Steele For You"	Christopher Hibler	Jeff Melvoin	January 22, 1985	4725	18.40
Mulch returns with a new business venture that his partner is using to swindle an investor. Film references: Blood Alley, The Day of the Jackal.
59	15	"Springtime for Steele"	Christopher Hibler	John Wirth	January 29, 1985	4722	18.90
The unexpected success of singer Rocky Sullivan (from episode No. 44, "Elementary Steele") threatens a little scheme cooked up by her managers and might get her killed. Film reference: The Producers.
60	16	"Steele in the Family"	Larry Elikann	Brad Kern	February 5, 1985	4723	19.90
Mildred's nephew comes to her for some help in hiding the body a hit man needs to confirm his contract with his employers. Film reference: The Corpse Came C.O.D.
61	17	"Diced Steele"	Don Weis	Jeff Melvoin	February 12, 1985	4727	17.50
An investigator from an insurance company digs into Steele's past after the agency loses their money in an effort to buy back stolen jewels.
62	18	"Now You Steele It, Now You Don't"	John Tracy	John Wirth	March 5, 1985	4724	14.30
Laura feels used by a client when she finds out an importer commits suicide after she unknowingly delivers a blackmail message to him. Film references: The Barefoot Contessa, T-Men.
63	19	"Illustrated Steele"	Gabrielle Beaumont	Kerry Lenhart & John J. Sakmar	March 12, 1985	4726	15.00
A young cartoonist finds his life threatened as the events of his strip start happening to him. Film references: Gaslight, How to Murder Your Wife, Psycho.
64	20	"Steele in the Chips"	Sheldon Larry	Story by : Howard Baldwin & Stephanie Zimbalist & Robin Bernheim; Teleplay by : Stephanie Zimbalist & Robin Bernheim	March 19, 1985	4710	15.80
Laura and Steele get involved in the search for the inventor of a no-cal cookie and his only batch of prototypes. Guest stars: Geena Davis as a tennis pro, Jean Smart as the inventor's fiancée, G. W. Bailey as a cookie manufacturer. Film references: Bambi, It's a Mad, Mad, Mad, Mad World.
65	21	"Steele Trying"	Rocky Lang	Michael Gleason	May 7, 1985	4717	19.50
Mr. Steele's plans for a romantic weekend in San Francisco are upset when his imaginary case turns into a real one. Film reference: The Lost Weekend.
66	22	"Steele of Approval"	Seymour Robbie	Brad Kern	May 14, 1985	4728	17.70
Laura investigates the background of a senatorial candidate while Steele dodges an investigator from the state licensing board.

=== Season 4 (1985–86) ===
No. overall	No. in season	Title	Directed by	Written by	Original release date	Prod. code	U.S. viewers (millions)
67	1	"Steele Searching: Part 1"	Seymour Robbie	Michael Gleason	September 24, 1985	5701	18.00
Laura races with Scotland Yard to locate Steele, who has become involved in murder while searching for a man with a clue to his past. Steele masquerades as an assassin hired by Daniel Chalmers to kill the Earl of Claridge. However, evidence indicates that the Earl is Steele's own father. Film references: Invasion of the Body Snatchers, Smokey and the Bandit.
68	2	"Steele Searching: Part 2"	Christopher Hibler	Michael Gleason	October 1, 1985	5702	17.60
See Part 1, above. Film reference: The Day of the Jackal.
69	3	"Steele Blushing"	Alexander Singer	John Wirth	October 22, 1985	5704	15.20
Laura protects a photographer (Kenneth Mars) and his files from angry clients and the FBI even after her doctored photo appears in a porno magazine. Guest star: Nana Visitor (near the end of the episode) Film reference: Hide in Plain Sight.
70	4	"Grappling Steele"	Don Weis	Rick Mittleman	October 29, 1985	5709	15.40
Laura and Steele are hired to protect a professional wrestler who has been receiving death threats and having mysterious "accidents." Film reference: A Bill of Divorcement (1932).
71	5	"Forged Steele"	Harry Harris	Rick Mittleman	November 12, 1985	5710	15.10
Steele awakens from a 36-hour blackout to find that he has apparently gambled away the agency. Film references: The Great Impostor, North by Northwest, 36 Hours.
72	6	"Corn Fed Steele"	Don Weis	Pamela Norris	November 19, 1985	5712	13.80
Laura and Steele look into the disappearance of some prized breeding pigs from an experimental farm in Iowa. Film references: Easy Rider, North by Northwest, Witness.
73	7	"Premium Steele"	Gabrielle Beaumont	Gerald Sanoff	December 3, 1985	5711	13.90
Laura and Steele try to discover why phony obituaries are being printed about people like poor garlic farmer Lester Shane. Film references: D.O.A., Gaslight, Gone with the Wind, The List of Adrian Messenger.
74	8	"Coffee, Tea, or Steele"	Christopher Hibler	Robin Bernheim	December 10, 1985	5714	16.00
Laura and Steele fly the unfriendly skies to learn why the body of a hired killer turned up on the baggage carousel of a luxury airline.
75	9	"Dancer, Prancer, Donner and Steele"	Christopher Hibler	Michael Gleason & Elliott Lewis	December 17, 1985	5708	15.80
The agency Christmas party is interrupted by three gun-wielding Santas who take everyone hostage and threaten to blow up the building. Film references: The Shanghai Cobra, The Taking of Pelham One Two Three.
76	10	"Steele on the Air"	Christopher Hibler	John J. Sakmar & Kerry Lenhart	January 7, 1986	5717	14.40
A traffic reporter dies while aloft in a helicopter and the two prime suspects are the disc jockeys, who were on the air at the time. Film references: Body Heat, The Third Man.
77	11	"Steele, Inc."	Don Weis	Brad Kern	January 14, 1986	5703	13.90
Mulch's latest brainstorm to franchise the agency gets an unfortunate investigator killed by an angry client. Film reference: The Maltese Falcon.
78	12	"Steele Spawning"	Will Mackenzie	John Wirth	January 28, 1986	5715	15.60
Laura and Steele are hired by the spoiled son of a caviar importer to find a missing shipment before daddy returns home. Film reference: The Macomber Affair.
79	13	"Suburban Steele"	Stan Lathan	Robin Bernheim	February 11, 1986	5716	12.60
Laura's sister finds a dead body on her kitchen floor and asks for help from a reluctant Laura and Steele. Film reference: Beverly Hills Cop. The A-Team.
80	14	"Santa Claus Is Coming to Steele"	Seymour Robbie	Michael Gleason	February 18, 1986	5721	15.60
One of the phony Santas from the ill-fated Christmas party (in episode No. 75, "Dancer, Prancer, Donner and Steele") returns to persuade a witness not to testify against him. Film references: Dirty Harry, Rear Window.
81	15	"Steele Blue Yonder"	Don Weis	Brad Kern	February 22, 1986	5718	13.80
A woman is afraid her father may need help but Laura and Steele learn he knows exactly what he's doing. Film reference: Going in Style.
82	16	"Sensitive Steele"	Don Weis	Rick Mittleman	March 1, 1986	5719	14.00
Laura and Steele go undercover at a self-improvement spa to find out why there have been a series of mysterious accidents. Film references: Save the Tiger, Hamlet.
83	17	"Steele in the Spotlight"	Burt Brinckerhoff	John J. Sakmar & Kerry Lenhart	March 8, 1986	5705	16.00
The search for a singer from the 1950s has unexpected, deadly consequences. Film references: Out of the Past, Sunset Boulevard.
84	18	"Steele at Your Service"	Rocky Lang	Lee H. Grant	March 15, 1986	5723	15.40
The servants of the wealthy Wellingtons hire Laura and Steele to find out who killed the former butler, who had planned on publishing his memoirs. Film reference: Blowup.
85	19	"Steele in the Running"	Gabrielle Beaumont	Susan Woollen	March 22, 1986	5713	14.10
Laura is assaulted while running in a triathlon after a desperate woman switches numbers with her.
86	20	"Beg, Borrow, or Steele"	Kevin Inch	Brad Kern	March 29, 1986	5722	13.00
Laura and Steele return from the East to find reports of their murder on the news and Mildred arrested for the crime. Film reference: Death Takes a Holiday.
87	21	"Steele Alive and Kicking"	Stan Lathan	John Wirth	May 3, 1986	5720	14.70
A man who framed himself so his wife could collect the reward learns he isn't terminally ill and wants Laura and Steele to clear him. Film reference: Convicted.
88	22	"Bonds of Steele"	Seymour Robbie	Jeff Melvoin	May 10, 1986	5706	15.10
Laura has her hands full trying to discover why an accountant at a huge corporation was killed. However, Steele's desire to quickly wed a call girl (Nancy Everhard) so as to avoid being deported distracts Laura from her murder investigation. Steele eventually ends up marrying Laura herself. Film references: Bride of Frankenstein, Casablanca, Death Takes a Holiday, The Happy Hooker, They Won't Believe Me.

=== Season 5 (1987) ===
No. overall	No. in season	Title	Directed by	Written by	Original release date	Prod. code	U.S. viewers (millions)
89	1	"The Steele That Wouldn't Die"	Kevin Inch	Brad Kern	January 5, 1987	6702	19.70
90	2	"The Steele That Wouldn't Die"	Kevin Inch	Brad Kern	January 5, 1987	6708	19.70
Steele is arrested for the murder of Norman Keyes while he and Laura try to honeymoon in Mexico. Film reference: Romancing the Stone, Butch Cassidy and the Sundance Kid, And Then There Were None, Beverly Hills Cop.
91	3	"Steele Hanging in There"	Christopher Hibler	Robin Bernheim	February 3, 1987	6706	13.80
92	4	"Steele Hanging in There"	Christopher Hibler	Robin Bernheim	February 10, 1987	6707	11.50
Their marriage faces a real test when a woman from Steele's past shows up, pretending to be married to him, and the archaeologist from Mexico returns, this time as an immigration officer. In London, Tony blackmails Steele into delivering a dangerous package, while Laura delves into Shannon's past. Film reference: Arsenic and Old Lace.
93	5	"Steeled with a Kiss"	Seymour Robbie	Robin Bernheim & Brad Kern	February 17, 1987	6709	15.50
94	6	"Steeled with a Kiss"	Seymour Robbie	Robin Bernheim & Brad Kern	February 17, 1987	6710	15.50
Laura and Steele visit the Irish castle he's inherited and decide to hide Tony there until he can prove he isn't a double agent. Daniel Chalmers must turn him over to the KGB as part of a scam he is running to help the daughter of an old friend. Daniel Chalmers does reveal himself as Steele's biological father. Remington and Laura do indeed get to settle their marriage.
