= List of The Tonight Show Starring Johnny Carson episodes (1963) =

- No. of episodes: 258

Release
- Original network: NBC

Season chronology
- ← Previous; 1962 episodes Next → 1964 episodes

The following is a list of episodes of the television series The Tonight Show Starring Johnny Carson which aired in 1963. In October, 1962 Johnny Carson took over as host of the show from the previous host Jack Paar.

== January ==
No.	Original release date	Guest(s)	Musical/entertainment guest(s)
65	January 1, 1963	June Taylor, Dolores Gray	Maynard Ferguson
66	January 2, 1963	Don Adams, Ronny Graham, Marlin Perkins	Barbra Streisand
67	January 3, 1963	Peter Cook, Edward Whitehead, Janet Blair,	Joanie Sommers
68	January 4, 1963	Melville Cooper, Dr. Joyce Brothers, Juki Arkin	Tommy Leonetti
69	January 7, 1963	Salvador Dalí, Bert Lahr, Patricia Morison	Don Chastain
70	January 8, 1963	Howard Keel	Phyllis Newman, Roger Williams
71	January 9, 1963	Carla Alberghetti, Glenda Leigh, Enrico	Don Cornell
72	January 10, 1963	Horst Buchholz, Don Adams, Jane Withers	Barbara Dane
73	January 11, 1963	Sandy Dennis, Michael Karmoyan	Erroll Garner, Joanie Sommers
74	January 14, 1963	Jimmy Dean (guest host)	Roger Miller, Jerry Vale, Al Hirt, Mimi Benzell
This was the first Tonight Show Starring Johnny Carson episode to have a guest host.
75	January 15, 1963	Jimmy Dean (guest host)	Chet Atkins, The Jordanaires, Anita Bryant, Salvatore Baccaloni
76	January 16, 1963	Jimmy Dean (guest host)	Jo Ann Campbell, Virginia O'Boyle, William Walker, Stu Hamblin
77	January 17, 1963	Jimmy Dean (guest host)	Homer and Jethro, Carmel Quinn, Amy Darlich, Howard Hartman, Lucho Navarro
78	January 18, 1963	Jimmy Dean (guest host), Peter Donald	Eddy Arnold, Sandy Stewart, The Powerhouse Four
79	January 21, 1963	Bert Parks, Juki Arkin	Earl Wrightson, Lois Hunt, Don Cherry
80	January 22, 1963	Mickey Shaughnessy, Adam Keefe	Rosalind Elias, The Del Rubio Triplets
81	January 23, 1963	Wally Cox, Hugh Griffith, Susan Kohner	Peter Duchin, The Terriers
82	January 24, 1963	Don Adams, Peter Lorre, Gretchen Wyler	Blossom Dearie
83	January 25, 1963	Agnes Moorehead, Ronny Graham, Adirek	Betty Johnson
84	January 28, 1963	John W. Bubbles, Howard Keel, Mitzi McCall, Charlie Brill	Jan McCart
A canine fashion show.
85	January 29, 1963	Paul Ford, Shirley Knight, Jack Douglas and wife Reiko	Robert Guillaume
86	January 30, 1963	Pierre Claf, Zachary Scott, Jacqueline Bertrand, The Ritts Puppets	N/A
87	January 31, 1963	Jan Sterling, Yvonne Constant, Mel Brooks, Alan Mowbray	Adirek

== February ==
No.	Original release date	Guest(s)	Musical/entertainment guest(s)
88	February 1, 1963	Mickey Shaughnessy	Matt and Ginny Dennis, Barbra Streisand
89	February 4, 1963	Shari Lewis, Phil Leeds, Dusty Martin	The Lettermen
90	February 5, 1963	Count Basie, Moose Charlap	Sandy Stewart, Lydia Linay
91	February 6, 1963	Jack Benny, Hal March	Jane Morgan
92	February 7, 1963	Mitch Miller	Oscar Peterson, Jill Corey, Connie Brigham
93	February 8, 1963	Jerry Van Dyke, Jean Liedloff	Vi Velasco
94	February 11, 1963	Dave Barry	Earl Wrightson, Yvonne Constant, The Brothers Four, The Barry Sisters
95	February 12, 1963	Cyril Ritchard, Susan Strasberg, Phil Foster, Ronnie Schell	Arlene Fontana
Carson and Ritchard receive an award from the American Heart Association in thanks for recording a fund-raising record for the organization.
96	February 13, 1963	Sargent Shriver, Patricia Morison, Sylvia Syms	The Kirby Stone Four
97	February 14, 1963	Adam Keefe	Teresa Brewer, Earl Humphreys
98	February 15, 1963	George Jessel, Celly Carryllo	Phyllis Newman, Richard Tucker
99	February 18, 1963	Robert Taylor, Romy Schneider	The Clancy Brothers and Tommy Makem, Barbara McNair
Joan Crawford receives a special CARE award.
100	February 19, 1963	Jan Murray, Eleanor Harris	Dave Brubeck, Robert Merrill
101	February 20, 1963	Art Linkletter, Hal March, Pippa Scott	Billy Daniels
102	February 21, 1963	Cliff Robertson, Wally Cox, Greco and Willard	Lou Rawls, Mindy Carson
103	February 22, 1963	Carl Reiner and Mel Brooks, Dr. Joyce Brothers	Carol Sloane
104	February 25, 1963	Jackie Mason, John W. Bubbles	Lucia Hawkins, Carmel Quinn
105	February 26, 1963	Glenn Ford, Hope Lange	Connie Francis, Peter, Paul, & Mary
106	February 27, 1963	Sam Levene, Pierre Burton	Patachou, Mickey Roberts Trio
107	February 28, 1963	Hedda Hopper, Patty Duke, Bette Davis, Richard Chamberlain, Suzanne Pleshette, Gary Clarke	N/A
Photoplay magazine Gold Medal honors for movies and television are presented.

== March ==
No.	Original release date	Guest(s)	Musical/entertainment guest(s)
108	March 1, 1963	Ronny Graham, David Doyle	Jane Morgan, Joe Williams
109	March 4, 1963	Gordon MacRae and Sheila MacRae, Jerry Shane	Dukes of Dixieland
110	March 5, 1963	Artie Shaw	Cannonball Adderley, Jackie and Roy
111	March 6, 1963	Ross Bagdasarian, Rosalind Elias, Jan De Ruth	Karen Morrow
112	March 7, 1963	Cassius Clay, Phil Foster	Micki Marlo
113	March 8, 1963	Richard Rodgers, Florence Henderson, Diahann Carroll, Joshua Logan	Earl Wrightson
The show is aimed at honoring Rodgers.
114	March 11, 1963	David Doyle, Charlie Manna	Arlene DeMarco
115	March 12, 1963	George Jessel, Frankie Laine	Patachou, The Four Saints
Jessel shows films of the Johnny Carson Day luncheon held in Los Angeles the previous week.
116	March 13, 1963	Greer Garson, Enrico, Adrianna del Mare	Lionel Hampton
117	March 14, 1963	William Saroyan, Tuesday Weld, Dr. Joyce Brothers, Greco and Willard	Bobby Kole
118	March 15, 1963	Mickey Shaughnessy, Augie and Margo Rodriguez	Roger Williams, Johnny Nash
119	March 18, 1963	Jack Douglas, Roger Ray	Teresa Brewer
Earlier in the day, Carson had testified before a House commerce subcommittee on TV ratings.
120	March 19, 1963	Myron Cohen, Yaffa Yarkoni, Yael Dayan	The Barry Sisters
121	March 20, 1963	Pierre Burton	Lovelace Watkins
122	March 21, 1963	Bruce Gordon, Ina Balin, Mr. Wizard, George Kirby	Harry Snow
123	March 22, 1963	Peter Falk, Ray Berwick	Jonah Jones
124	March 25, 1963	Shari Lewis, Warren Robertson, Harry Golde	Gigi Galon
125	March 26, 1963	Thelma Ritter, Joe Garagiola	Jimmy Smith, Phyllis Newman
126	March 27, 1963	Lorne Greene, Taina Elg	Lovelace Watkins
127	March 28, 1963	Wally Cox, Lanier Davis, Andrianna del Mare	N/A
128	March 29, 1963	George Jessel, Betsy Palmer, John W. Bubbles	Trio Bel Canto

== April ==
No.	Original release date	Guest(s)	Musical/entertainment guest(s)
129	April 1, 1963	Jimmy Breslin, Ronny Graham, Margaret Moses	The Four Freshmen
130	April 2, 1963	George Hamilton, Patricia Morison, Adam Keefe, Masami Kuni	Carol Sloane
131	April 3, 1963	Francis Brunn	The Rooftop Singers
132	April 4, 1963	Joan Collins, Eddie Lawrence, cartoonist Marty Lowe	Giorgio Tozzi, The Group
133	April 5, 1963	Al Lewis, The Muppets, Enrico	Rosalind Elias
134	April 8, 1963	Earl Holliman, Madeleine Sherwood, Joey Carter	N/A
135	April 9, 1963	Francoise Sagan, Bruce Gordon, Don Allen	Katina Ranieri
136	April 10, 1963	Phil Foster, Contessa Christina Poalozzi	Earl Wrightson, Lois Hunt
137	April 11, 1963	Carl Reiner	N/A
138	April 12, 1963	George Jessel, Claire Fazel, Lucho Navarro	Robert Merrill
139	April 15, 1963	Zsa Zsa Gabor, Huey Green	N/A
140	April 16, 1963	Dan Duryea, Mickey Spillane, David Doyle	N/A
141	April 17, 1963	Richard Boone	The Muppets
142	April 18, 1963	Sandy Dennis, Brendan Behan, Marty Latham	Giorgio Tozzi
143	April 19, 1963	David Merrick, Glynis Johns, Phil Foster	N/A
144	April 22, 1963	Debbie Reynolds, Ann B. Davis	Allen and Rossi
145	April 23, 1963	Brooks Hays, Diana Dors, Kurt Kaszner	Paul Anka
146	April 24, 1963	Beatrice Lillie, Milt Kamen, Little Egypt, Rev. William Bell Glenesk	N/A
147	April 25, 1963	Rocky Marciano, Dmitri Vale, Glynis Johns	N/A
148	April 26, 1963	Eartha Kitt, Dore Schary, Sammy Cahn, Suh Young Hee	The Lettermen
149	April 29, 1963	Larry Blyden, Arlene Dahl, Louis Nye	The Hi-Lo's
150	April 30, 1963	Dan Blocker, France Nuyen, James J. O'Keefe	Della Reese

== May ==
No.	Original release date	Guest(s)	Musical/entertainment guest(s)
151	May 1, 1963	Shel Silverstein, Sally Blair	N/A
152	May 2, 1963	Bob Hope, William Saroyan, Brook Benton	N/A
153	May 3, 1963	Bob Considine, Gayelord Hauser, Al Lewis, Salome Jens	Carol Sloane
154	May 6, 1963	Judy Holliday, Tammy Grimes, Phil Foster	Erroll Garner, Terri Thornton
155	May 7, 1963	Donald O'Connor, Darla Hood, Bernard Pfeiffer	N/A
156	May 8, 1963	Darren McGavin, Rose Marie	Miriam Makeba
157	May 9, 1963	Olivia de Havilland, Alan Young, Pat Carroll, Brook Benton, Kurt Kasznar	N/A
158	May 10, 1963	Dr. Joyce Brothers, Al Capp, Allen and Rossi, Diana Dors	N/A
159	May 13, 1963	(FROM LOS ANGELES) Oleg Cassini, Sandy Dennis	Ella Fitzgerald, Duke Ellington
This is the first episode in which The Tonight Show starring Johnny Carson is taped on the road.
160	May 14, 1963	(FROM LOS ANGELES) Mayor Sam Yorty, George Burns, Otto Preminger, Sonny Tufts	Rosemary Clooney
161	May 15, 1963	(FROM LOS ANGELES) Howard Duff, Ida Lupino, Marlon Brando, Zsa Zsa Gabor, Allan Sherman	Freda Payne
162	May 16, 1963	(FROM LOS ANGELES) Ed Begley, Stanley Kramer, Joan Benny	Martin Denny Group
163	May 17, 1963	(FROM LOS ANGELES) Robert Taylor	January Jones
164	May 20, 1963	(FROM LOS ANGELES) Anna Maria Alberghetti, Mort Sahl, Elsa Lanchester, Walter O'Malley, Dr. Frank Baxter	N/A
165	May 21, 1963	(FROM LOS ANGELES) Kirk Douglas, Milton Berle, Edmund G. Brown, Inger Stevens, Maury Wills	Kaye Stevens
166	May 22, 1963	(FROM LOS ANGELES) Raymond Massey, Ernest Borgnine, Maureen O'Hara, Wiere Brothers	N/A
167	May 23, 1963	(FROM LOS ANGELES) Edie Adams, Dean Jagger, George Kirby, Inger Stevens, Joan Benny, Abby Albin	Vicki Carr
168	May 24, 1963	(FROM LOS ANGELES) Bob Hope, Ralph Bellamy, Janis Paige, Leslie Caron	Liberace
169	May 27, 1963	George Jessel, Artie Shaw, Elaine Shepard	Keely Smith, Rolf Harris
170	May 28, 1963	Bob Hope, Tallulah Bankhead, Malcolm Muggeridge	Kitty Kallen
171	May 29, 1963	Jack Douglas and wife Reiko, William Bendix, Bil Baird and wife Cora Baird	Terri Thornton
172	May 30, 1963	Arthur Godfrey, Jimmy Breslin, Phil Foster	Jane Morgan
173	May 31, 1963	Quentin Reynolds, Milt Kamen, John W. Bubbles	Rosemary Clooney

== June ==
No.	Original release date	Guest(s)	Musical/entertainment guest(s)
174	June 3, 1963	Arthur Godfrey (guest host), Walter Slezak, Nipsey Russell, Meredith Willson, Frank D'Rone	Liza Minnelli
175	June 4, 1963	Arthur Godfrey (guest host), Eddie Rickenbacker, Najeeb Halaby, Claire Chennault	N/A
176	June 5, 1963	Arthur Godfrey (guest host), Lauren Bacall, writer Rufus Jarmon, Dr. Thomas Reiss of the African Research Foundation, The Giesenslav Brothers	Johnny Nash, June Valli
177	June 6, 1963	Arthur Godfrey (guest host), Gen. Ira Eaker, C.R. Smith, Richard Hayes, Wisa D'Orso, Dennis Rigor,	N/A
178	June 7, 1963	Arthur Godfrey (guest host), Shari Lewis, Louis Nizer, Jimmy Cannon, William Dupree	N/A
179	June 10, 1963	Jill St. John, Harry Golden, Sally Rand	Bobby Kole
180	June 11, 1963	Jerry Colonna, Selma Diamond, Maurice Edelman, Dr. Rose Franzblau	Phyllis McGuire
181	June 12, 1963	Roddy McDowall, Bernard Brothers	N/A
Videotaped highlights are shown of Bert Parks interviewing celebrities at the premiere of the movie Cleopatra.
182	June 13, 1963	Jerry Van Dyke, Oleg Cassini, Eleanor Harris	Miriam Makeba
183	June 14, 1963	Al Lewis, Helen Gurley Brown, Jan Peerce	Nancy Wilson
184	June 17, 1963	Margaret Rutherford, Milt Kamen, Manolo Fabregas	N/A
185	June 18, 1963	Rona Jaffe, Vance Packard, Muriel Grosfield	Tony Bennett
186	June 19, 1963	Al Capp, Lincoln Zonn	N/A
187	June 20, 1963	Louis Nizer, William Saroyan, Jerry Shane	January Jones
188	June 21, 1963	Selma Diamond, Ed Begley, Parnelli Jones	Jane Harvey
189	June 24, 1963	Eva Gabor, Myron Cohen, Bo Belinsky, Maurusia	Jean-Paul Vignon
190	June 25, 1963	Phil Foster, Paula Prentiss, Robert Berks	Miriam Makeba
191	June 26, 1963	Louis Nye, Jimmy Piersall, The Baker Twins	Benjamin Occassio
192	June 27, 1963	Roland Kirk, Commander Whitehead, Dr. Rose Franzblau	Rosemary Clooney
Miss Universe finalists are presented.
193	June 28, 1963	George Jessel, Walter Matthau, John Diebold	Carol Sloane

== July ==
No.	Original release date	Guest(s)	Musical/entertainment guest(s)
194	July 1, 1963	Diana Dors, Kurt Kasznar, Gordon Currie	N/A
195	July 2, 1963	Dana Andrews, Marya Mannes, Jerry Holmes, Benson & Mann	N/A
196	July 3, 1963	Sander Vanocur, Jose Duval	Angelo DiPippo
197	July 4, 1963	Duke Ellington, Artie Shaw,	Mimi Benzell
198	July 5, 1963	Adam Keefe	The Group
199	July 8, 1963	Milt Kamen, Rona Jaffe, Lefty Gomez	Patrice Munsel
200	July 9, 1963	John Diebold, Reginald Gardener, George Kirby	N/A
201	July 10, 1963	Allan Sherman, Pierre Geistan	Toni Lee Scott
202	July 11, 1963	Corbett Monica, The Amazing Dunninger	Della Reese
203	July 12, 1963	Edie Adams, Al Capp, Doug Kingman	Tony Martin
204	July 15, 1963	Mickey Rooney, Bobby Van, Adam Keefe	Earl Wrightson and Lois Hunt
205	July 16, 1963	Mamie Van Doren, Bill Veeck, Harry Golden, Marty Lowe	N/A
206	July 17, 1963	Damita Jo, Buitoni	Victor Borge
207	July 18, 1963	Artie Shaw, Jackie Mason, Lisa Charell	Joe Williams, Ralph Slitkin
208	July 19, 1963	Louis Nye, Richard Harris	Toni Lee Scott
209	July 22, 1963	Diana Dors, Phil Foster, Marya Mannes	Jerry Vale
210	July 23, 1963	James Garner, Benny Rubin, Marty Lowe	Sandy Stewart, Jonah Jones Quartet
211	July 24, 1963	Commander Whitehead, Ilka Chase	Teresa Brewer, Tina Robin
212	July 25, 1963	Jerry Van Dyke, Susan Oliver	Della Reese, Koto
213	July 26, 1963	Selma Diamond, Oleg Cassini, Shel Silverstein	Carmel Quinn
214	July 29, 1963	Ed McMahon and Skitch Henderson (guest hosts), Abe Burrows, Jeannie Carson, George Christy	N/A
215	July 30, 1963	Ed McMahon and Skitch Henderson (guest hosts), Shelley Winters, Larry Storch, Elizabeth Allen	William and Walker
216	July 31, 1963	Ed McMahon and Skitch Henderson (guest hosts), Pat O'Brien, Jan Sterling, Ty Hardin, Sally Ann Howes	Jean Paul Vignon

== August ==
No.	Original release date	Guest(s)	Musical/entertainment guest(s)
217	August 1, 1963	Ed McMahon and Skitch Henderson (guest hosts), Elaine Stritch,	Joe Williams
218	August 2, 1963	Ed McMahon and Skitch Henderson (guest hosts), Senator Ted Kennedy	N/A
219	August 5, 1963	Allan Sherman (guest host), Rod Serling, Rose Marie, Pat Carroll	Ray Charles
220	August 6, 1963	Allan Sherman (guest host), Art Buchwald, Jim Backus, Bill Cosby	Kaye Stevens
221	August 7, 1963	Allan Sherman (guest host), Robert Stack, Phyllis Diller, Ernest Adler	N/A
222	August 8, 1963	Allan Sherman (guest host), Buddy Hackett	Shirley Horn, Salvatore Baccaloni
223	August 9, 1963	Allan Sherman (guest host), Richard Gehman, Henry Morgan	Jane Harvey, Tony Martin
224	August 12, 1963	Diana Dors, Henny Youngman	Tommy Leonetti
225	August 13, 1963	Mel Brooks, Claudia Cardinale	Robert Merrill, Three Flames
226	August 14, 1963	Jean Seberg, Alan King, Betty Friedan	Freda Payne
227	August 15, 1963	Commander Whitehead, Lesia Pappas	Kaye Stevens
228	August 16, 1963	George Christy	Della Reese, Tommy Leonetti
229	August 19, 1963	Mamie Van Doren, Mickey Manners	Harmonicats
230	August 20, 1963	Janet Leigh, Stirling Moss	Frankie Laine
231	August 21, 1963	Larry Storch, Mercedes McCambridge, Phil Foster	N/A
232	August 22, 1963	Pamela Mason, Ben Hecht, Bergen Evans	N/A
233	August 23, 1963	Phil Foster, Harry Mimma	N/A
234	August 26, 1963	Exiled King Peter II of Yugoslavia, Harry Golden, Clifford Guest	Tommy Leonetti
235	August 27, 1963	Eva Gabor, Milt Kamen	Sam Cooke, Micki Marlo
236	August 28, 1963	Benny Rubin	Louis Prima and Gia Maione, Carmel Quinn
First 45 minutes of the show were preempted by NBC wrapup of the March on Washington.
237	August 29, 1963	George Jessel, Horace McMahon, Dick McCormack	Constance Towers
238	August 30, 1963	Rod Serling, Pamela Mason, Barbara Michaels	Ferrante and Teicher, Tommy Leonetti

== September ==
No.	Original release date	Guest(s)	Musical/entertainment guest(s)
239	September 2, 1963	Betsy Palmer, Corbett Monica, Nandor Fodor	Lovelace Watkins
240	September 3, 1963	Mamie Van Doren, Kurt Kasznar, Bob Melvin	Felicia Sanders
241	September 4, 1963	Allen and Rossi, Jay Ward, Jennie Smith	N/A
242	September 5, 1963	Jerry Van Dyke, Angelo DePippo, Gene Baylos	N/A
243	September 6, 1963	Marianne Means	Joe Mooney, Tommy Leonetti
244	September 9, 1963	Imogene Coca, Gary Lockwood, Lulu Porter	Jules Munshin
245	September 10, 1963	Mitch Miller, Shari Lewis, Andy Sinatra	Jan Peerce, Tommy Leonetti
246	September 11, 1963	Sol Hurok, Merle Oberon, Al Capp, Phil Foster	Leslie Uggams
247	September 12, 1963	Kurt Kasznar, Jesse White, Gene Baylos	Constance Towers, The Big 3
248	September 13, 1963	Larry Blyden, Marty Ingels, Barbara Nichols	Freda Payne
249	September 16, 1963	Lorne Greene, Sheldon Leonard, Maj. James Anderson	Sylvia Syms
250	September 17, 1963	Richard Chamberlain, Henry Morgan, Elaine Stewart, Jess Stearn, Susan Barrett	N/A
251	September 18, 1963	James Franciscus, Milt Kamen, Carlos Arruza, Lisa Charrell	N/A
252	September 19, 1963	Al Lewis, Burmese surgeon Dr. Ohlmanson	Anita Ray and Diane Hall, Patachou
253	September 20, 1963	Bill Dana, Selma Diamond, Kermit Schaefer	John Gary
254	September 23, 1963	Henny Youngman, Richard Egan	The Big 3, Bill Dyer
255	September 24, 1963	Mary Miller, Harry Golden	N/A
256	September 25, 1963	Eva Gabor, Jack Ging, Allan Drake	The New Group
257	September 26, 1963	Jan Murray, Muriel Stafford	Tony Martin
258	September 27, 1963	Larry Storch, Barbara Nichols, Anatole de Grunwald	Oscar Peterson
259	September 30, 1963	Rose Marie, Bob Feller	The New Group

== October ==
No.	Original release date	Guest(s)	Musical/entertainment guest(s)
260	October 1, 1963	New York City mayor Robert F. Wagner, Jr., Henny Youngman, John W. Bubbles	Abbe Lane,
Johnny celebrates his first anniversary as the host of The Tonight Show.
261	October 2, 1963	Stanley Kramer, William Saroyan	John Gary
262	October 3, 1963	Barbara Nichols, Al Capp, Sylvia Syms	Victor Borge
263	October 4, 1963	New York City traffic commissioner Henry Barnes	Fran Warren, Erroll Garner
264	October 7, 1963	Pernell Roberts, George Jessel, Patrice Wymore	William Walker
265	October 8, 1963	James Garner, Ossie Davis, Ruby Dee, Jeane Dixon, Commander Whitehead	N/A
266	October 9, 1963	Melvin Belli, Henry Morgan, Lisa Charrell, George Kirby	Irene Reid
267	October 10, 1963	Al Capp, Dr. Joost Meerloo	The Big 3
268	October 11, 1963	Phil Foster, Rep. Jim Wright	Teresa Brewer
269	October 14, 1963	Dr. Joyce Brothers, Milt Kamen, C. Northcote Parkinson	Susan Barrett
270	October 15, 1963	Mary Ann Mobley, American Medical Association president Edward R. Annis	Erik Friedman
271	October 16, 1963	Selma Diamond, Marlin Perkins	N/A
272	October 17, 1963	Joey Bishop, Shari Lewis, Abby Dalton, Max Friedman	Enzo Stuarti
273	October 18, 1963	William Peter Blatty, Barbara Nichols, Miss Vermont Melissa Stafford	Jan Peerce
274	October 21, 1963	Groucho Marx, Pamela Mason, Harry Lorayne	Felicia Sanders
275	October 22, 1963	Raymond Massey, Daniel Massey, Corbett Monica	The DeCastro Sisters
276	October 23, 1963	Sterling Hayden, writer Martha Wyman Lear	N/A
277	October 24, 1963	Max Gordon	Benny Goodman, Abbe Lane
278	October 25, 1963	Kenneth Galbraith, Al Capp, Libby Morris	Laurindo Almeida
279	October 28, 1963	Ed McMahon and Skitch Henderson guest hosts, Abe Burrows, Richard Gehman, Jimmy Breslin	N/A
Johnny Carson was filming a cameo in the movie, Looking for Love.
280	October 29, 1963	Ed McMahon and Skitch Henderson guest hosts, Larry Storch, George Maharis, Gloria DeHaven, scientist I.M. Leavitt	Jackie Davis, Flatt and Scruggs
Johnny Carson was filming a cameo in the movie, Looking for Love.
281	October 30, 1963	Alan King, Harry Lorayne, Leela Naidu	Andy Williams
282	October 31, 1963	Groucho Marx, Denise Darcel, Lisa Charrell	The Hi-Lo's

== November ==
No.	Original release date	Guest(s)	Musical/entertainment guest(s)
283	November 1, 1963	Woody Allen	O.C. Smith
284	November 4, 1963	Dr. Joyce Brothers, London Lee	Tommy Leonetti
285	November 5, 1963	George Jessel	Miriam Makeba, Robert Merrill
286	November 6, 1963	Larry Storch, Joan Copeland, Willie Harack	Jill Corey
287	November 7, 1963	Alan King, Al Capp, writer Martha Wineham Lear	Nancy Wilson
288	November 8, 1963	Henry Morgan, Rose Franzblau	N/A
289	November 11, 1963	James Stewart, Phyllis Diller, Ed Wynn, Ann Vivian	Jack Teagarden
290	November 12, 1963	Allan Sherman, Yvonne DeCarlo, Dr. Joyce Brothers	N/A
291	November 13, 1963	Hans Conried, Ann Landers	Anna Moffo
292	November 14, 1963	Betsy Palmer, Phil Foster, John W. Bubbles	Tony Martin
293	November 15, 1963	Larry Storch, Annie Farge	Chris Connor
294	November 18, 1963	Secretary of the Interior Stewart Udall, Arlene Dahl	Dennis Day, Johnny Desmond
295	November 19, 1963	Jerry Van Dyke, Jimmy Breslin, Charlene Holt	Carol Sloane
296	November 20, 1963	Art Carney, Libby Morris, Joyce Davidson	Stan Getz
297	November 21, 1963	Henry Morgan, Dr. Robert Baird	Joe Williams, Rolf Harris
(11/22/63 & 11/25/63 pre-empted for NBC News coverage of President John F. Kennedy assassination and funeral).
298	November 26, 1963	George Jessel, Libby Morris, Paul Gallico	Joey Heatherton
289	November 27, 1963	Lorne Greene, Corbett Monica	Dorothy Kirsten
290	November 28, 1963	Allan Sherman, Tuesday Weld, John W. Bubbles	N/A
291	November 29, 1963	Al Capp, Kenny Delmar, Jackie Clarke	Joe and Eddie

NOTE: 11/22 broadcast cancelled due to the assassination of John F. Kennedy. Scheduled guests for 11/22 were actor Kirk Douglas, comedian Henny Youngman, singing group The Willis Sisters and actor/comedian Dave King.

== December ==
No.	Original release date	Guest(s)	Musical/entertainment guest(s)
292	December 2, 1963	Alan King, Davis and Reese	The King Sisters
293	December 3, 1963	Henny Youngman, Don Stewart, Ivan Sanderson, Annie Fargé	N/A
294	December 4, 1963	Arnold Palmer	The Willis Sisters
295	December 5, 1963	Selma Diamond	Perry Botkin
296	December 6, 1963	Milt Kamen, Richard Tucker, The Wazzam Troupe	N/A
297	December 9, 1963	Woody Allen, Shari Lewis, Eli Mintz, Eleanor Powell	Carol Sloane
298	December 10, 1963	Larry Blyden, Dave King, Carol Lynley	N/A
299	December 11, 1963	Al Capp, Raymond A. Wesolowski, Duncan Spinning Top Champion	N/A
300	December 12, 1963	Johnny Mercer, Eva Gabor	Dick and Richard
301	December 13, 1963	Milt Kamen	Richard Tucker
302	December 16, 1963	Phil Foster, New York City postmaster Robert K. Christenberry	Jane Morgan, The Big 3
303	December 17, 1963	Kaye Ballard, Roger Conklin	Jan Peerce
304	December 18, 1963	Al Capp, Eli Mintz, Peter Urban	Milt Grayson
305	December 19, 1963	Allen and Rossi	Fran Warren
A Christmas wrapping demonstration.
306	December 20, 1963	Elizabeth Ashley, Jonathan Miller	Joel Grey, Vaughn Monroe
307	December 23, 1963	Peter Bull, Dawn Nickerson	Tony Bennett
308	December 25, 1963	Shari Lewis, Gerald Peters	Earl Wrightson, Dolores Hawkins
309	December 26, 1963	Corbett Monica, Dr. Joyce Brothers	O.C. Smith
310	December 27, 1963	George Jessel, Jim Fowler	Tommy Leonetti
311	December 30, 1963	Kaye Ballard, Jimmy Breslin, Myron Cohen	O.C. Smith
312	December 31, 1963	Woody Allen, Louise Lasser, Rudy Vallee	Yvonne Constant
Coverage of the New Year's Eve Times Square Ball drop in Times Square.
