= List of The Tonight Show Starring Johnny Carson episodes (1962) =

- No. of episodes: 64

Release
- Original network: NBC

Season chronology
- ← Previous; Season 1961 Next → 1963 episodes

The following is a list of episodes of the television series The Tonight Show Starring Johnny Carson which aired in 1962. In October, 1962 Johnny Carson took over as host of the show from the previous host Jack Paar.

== October ==
No.	Original release date	Guest(s)	Musical/entertainment guest(s)
1	October 1, 1962	Groucho Marx, Tony Bennett, Mel Brooks, Joan Crawford, Tom Pardi, Rudy Vallée	The Phoenix Singers
Johnny Carson hosts The Tonight Show for the first time at the age of 36, replacing Jack Paar. Joined by Ed McMahon as the announcer and sidekick, along with Skitch Henderson and the NBC Orchestra.
2	October 2, 1962	Tallulah Bankhead, Artie Shaw, Shelley Berman	Fran Bennett, Bob Carroll
3	October 3, 1962	Bobby Darin, Margaret O'Brien, Ann Corio, Bruce Randall, Leo De Lyon	Chad Mitchell Trio
4	October 4, 1962	Barbra Streisand, Dennis Weaver, Jean Carroll, Raymond Massey, Sander Vanocur	Mickey Roberts Trio
5	October 5, 1962	Red Buttons, Katyn Ranieri, Richard E. MacCormack	Robert Merrill, Corinne Griffith
6	October 8, 1962	Jack Benny, Joan Benny, Mitch Miller, Sebastian Cabot, Commander Edward Whitehead	Tina Robin
7	October 9, 1962	Susan Strasberg, Sal Mineo, Charles Nelson Reilly, Irwin Corey	Toni Arden, Tina Robin
8	October 10, 1962	Julie Newmar, Smith & Dale, Howard G. Minsky, Signe Hasso, Dore Schary	Tommy Leonetti, Percy Botkin
9	October 11, 1962	Benny Goodman, Corbett Monica, Jack Bailey, Louis J. Camuti, The Alberts, Bruce Lacey	Julie Wilson
10	October 12, 1962	Melina Mercouri, The Alberts, Peter Wyden, Rise Stevens, Bruce Lacey	Lonnie Donegan, Enrico
11	October 15, 1962	Rosemary Clooney, Ben Lyon	Roger Miller, The Little Sisters
A fashion show was also part of the program.
12	October 16, 1962	Eddie Bracken, Haunani, Marcel Wilson, Kay Gill, Linda Thompson	Haunani Kahalewai, Alexandre
13	October 17, 1962	Michèle Morgan, Felicia Sanders	Ferrante and Teicher
14	October 18, 1962	Helen O'Connell, Jayne Mansfield, Dr. Joyce Brothers, Rise Stevens	Olatunji
15	October 19, 1962	Jack E. Leonard, Harold Steinberg, Dick Patterson, Jacqueline Bertrand	Georgia Gibbs
16	October 22, 1962	George Jessel, Walter Gaudnek	Patrice Munsel, The Singing Grandmothers
17	October 23, 1962	Janet Leigh, Red Buttons, Fran Jeffries	Eddie Fisher
18	October 24, 1962	Helen O'Connell, Peter Donald, Lucienne Bridou, Masumi Kuni, Sid Marlow the Mentalist	N/A
19	October 25, 1962	Marilyn Van Derbur, Antonino Rocca	Jimmy Dean
20	October 26, 1962	Betsy Palmer, Teresa Brewer	Beatrice Lillie
21	October 29, 1962	Shelley Winters, Charlie Manna	Erroll Garner, Pete Brady
22	October 30, 1962	Emily Yancy, Shari Lewis, Jerry Vale, Enrico	Earl Wrightson
23	October 31, 1962	Sheila MacRae, Rosey Grier, Allie Sherman, Carl Ballentine, John W. Bubbles, Chas Chase	The Clancy Brothers

== November ==
No.	Original release date	Guest(s)	Musical/entertainment guest(s)
24	November 1, 1962	Signe Hasso, Shirley Anne Field, Katherine Dunham, Nancy Vonderheide	Vaughn Monroe
25	November 2, 1962	Barbra Streisand, Beatrice Lillie, Gloria Lambert	The Clancy Brothers
26	November 5, 1962	Tony Martin, Ronnie Schell, Jacqueline Bertrand	Gloria Lambert
(11/6/62 pre-empted for NBC News mid-term election night coverage).
27	November 7, 1962	William Saroyan, Alice Ghostley	Della Reese, Kay Armen
28	November 8, 1962	Danny Kaye, Dave Astor, Dr. Cleo Dawson	Kay Armen
29	November 9, 1962	Tom Peters, Stirling Moss	N/A
30	November 12, 1962	Frankie Laine, Willie Mosconi, Jane Harvey	Yvonne Constant
31	November 13, 1962	Virginia Wing, Phil Leeds	The Little Sisters, Earl Wrightson
32	November 14, 1962	Mae Questel, Jack E. Leonard, Rudy Vallée, The Bhaskar Dancers	N/A
33	November 15, 1962	Alan King, Carol Channing, Benson and Mann	Denise Lor
34	November 16, 1962	Betty White, Larry Storch, Harvey Lembeck, Gene Baylos, Bob Rollins	Sam Cooke, The 4 Saints
35	November 19, 1962	Patricia Morison, Lori Nelson, Jack Douglas and wife Reiko	The Folksters
Film was shown of Johnny's participation in U.S. air maneuvers with the United States Air Force Thunderbirds.
36	November 20, 1962	Gloria DeHaven, Abe Burrows	Bob Carroll, The Kirby Stone Four
37	November 21, 1962	Sam Snead, Walter Gaudnek	Roger Miller, Patrice Munsel
38	November 22, 1962	Katyna Ranieri, Enrico, Bob Rollins, Ronnie Chapman	N/A
39	November 23, 1962	Maureen O'Sullivan, Tony Martin, John Bubbles	Fran Warren, Paul Winter Jazz Sextet
40	November 26, 1962	Sam Levenson, Peter Fonda, Yvonne Constant, Marcy Abbott	The Folksters
41	November 27, 1962	Salvatore Baccaloni, Lucienne Bridou, Anthony Simos, Maximilian Schell	June Valli
42	November 28, 1962	Artie Shaw, Kay Armen, Dr. Joyce Brothers	Keeley Smith
43	November 29, 1962	Phil Foster, Dolores Gray, Sammy Snead	The Phoenix Singers, Maynard Ferguson
44	November 30, 1962	Vincent Price, The Baker Twins	Jacqueline Bertrand, Brook Benton

== December ==
No.	Original release date	Guest(s)	Musical/entertainment guest(s)
45	December 3, 1962	Dean Jones, Walter Slezak, Jackie Miles	Roberta Sherwood
46	December 4, 1962	Andy Williams, Sandy Stewart. Commander Edward Whitehead	Gene Krupa
47	December 5, 1962	Bert Parks, George Kirby, Jimmy Piersall	Helen O'Connell
48	December 6, 1962	Tom Ewell, Patricia Morison, Don Chastain	Five Bowl Queens
Johnny introduces the Look Magazine college football All-America team.
49	December 7, 1962	Phyllis McGuire, Clyde Beatty	The Little Sisters
50	December 10, 1962	Maria Von Trapp, Charlie Manna	Virginia Wing, The Four Saints
51	December 11, 1962	Peter Lind Hayes and Mary Healy, Eileen Barton, Jack Douglas and wife Reiko	Lucho Navarro
52	December 12, 1962	George Jessel, John Bubbles, Mitzi Mason	Earl Wrightson, Lois Hunt
53	December 13, 1962	Allen and Rossi, Jan Murray, Arnold Stang	Connie Boswell
54	December 14, 1962	Keenan Wynn, Shari Lewis, Adolphe Menjou	N/A
A lingerie fashion show.
55	December 17, 1962	Peter O'Toole, Larry Storch	William Walker, Juela Gill and Oranim Zabar
56	December 18, 1962	Barry Sullivan, Mickey Spillane, David Frye, Keely Smith	The Jonah Jones Quartet
57	December 19, 1962	Pat Harrington, Jr., Lillian Roth, Henry Gibson, Judy Joy	Joe Williams
58	December 20, 1962	Alan King, Steve Lawrence, Dolores Gray	Erroll Garner
59	December 21, 1962	Phil Foster, Kay Armen, Dick McCormack	Yvonne Constant
60	December 25, 1962	Peter Ustinov, Betsy Palmer, Gale Del Corral	Rise Stevens
Film of Johnny playing Santa Claus at a New York department store.
61	December 26, 1962	Dorothy Dandridge	The Little Sisters, Don Cherry
62	December 27, 1962	Harry Golden, Enrico, Frank Raines	Jacqueline Bertrand
63	December 28, 1962	Della Reese, Irwin Corey	The Baker Twins
64	December 31, 1962	Artie Shaw, Phyllis Newman, Benson and Mann, John Bubbles	N/A
Live New Year's Eve Times Square segment with Ben Grauer; rest of the show is taped.
