= The Melody Top =

Musical theatre in Milwaukee, Wisconsin

Coordinates: 43°08′47″N 88°0′6″W

The Melody Top Theatre was a musical theatre located in Milwaukee, Wisconsin and featured performances in the round. The theatre that was originally built as a circus-style tent is now defunct.

== History ==
The Melody Top was built in 1962. It was only operational during the summers beginning in 1963. The theatre was modeled after the identical Melody Top in Chicago. The large venue lasted until 1986. The theatre was originally built in the form of a giant, circus-style tent. It was located on W Good Hope Road, just east of N 76th St in Milwaukee. Later, the architecture of the venue comprised a wooden dome. The Milwaukee Melody Top was affiliated with a second Melody Top located in Hillside, Illinois.

The Melody Top hosted "...Broadway quality presentations of big scale musical hits..." The theatre hosted celebrities such as Leonard Nimoy in Oliver!; Betty White in My Fair Lady; and Christopher Walken in West Side Story.

== Productions ==
=== 1963 ===
- Guys and Dolls - starring Gordon and Sheila MacRae
- The Music Man - starring Forrest Tucker
- The Unsinkable Molly Brown - starring Jaye P. Morgan
- The Vagabond King - starring Earl Wrightson and Lois Hunt
- Bye Bye Birdie - starring Van Johnson
- Brigadoon - starring Dennis Day and McLean Stevenson

=== 1964 ===
- Kiss Me, Kate - starring Howard Keel
- Gentlemen Prefer Blondes - starring Betty Hutton
- Wildcat - starring Martha Raye
- Roberta - starring Edward Everett Horton
- Little Me - starring Gabriel Dell and Karen Morrow
- Mr. President - starring Bert Parks
- The Pajama Game - starring Phil Ford and Mimi Hines

=== 1965 ===
- West Side Story - starring Anna Maria Alberghetti and Christopher Walken
- South Pacific - starring Betty White and Gene Hollmann
- Bells Are Ringing - starring Phil Ford and Mimi Hines
- My Fair Lady - starring Michael Allinson and Barbara Williams
- Annie Get Your Gun - starring Jaye P. Morgan and Gary Mann
- The Sound of Music - starring Janet Blair and John Myhers
- Camelot - starring Earl Wrightson and Lois Hunt

=== 1966 ===
- The King and I - starring Gisele MacKenzie
- Can-Can - starring Monique van Vooren
- Gypsy - starring Janis Paige
- Flower Drum Song - starring Chita Rivera
- Milk and Honey - starring Molly Picon
- Call Me Madam - starring Margaret Whiting and Tommy Sands
- How to Succeed in Business Without Really Trying - starring Robert Q. Lewis and Karen Morrow

=== 1967 ===
- Sweet Charity - starring Gretchen Wyler
- Lady in the Dark - starring Patrice Munsel
- High Button Shoes - starring Margaret Whiting and Gabriel Dell
- Silk Stockings - starring Earl Wrightson and Lois Hunt
- The Boy Friend - starring Jane Powell
- On a Clear Day You Can See Forever - starring Forrest Tucker
- Carousel - starring John Raitt

=== 1968 ===
- Irma la Douce - starring Chita Rivera
- Fanny - starring Anna Maria Alberghetti
- Where's Charley? - starring Gabriel Dell and Eileen Brennan
- Take Me Along - starring Robert Q. Lewis
- Pal Joey - starring Margaret Whiting
- The Desert Song - starring Anne Jeffreys and Bill Hayes
- Of Thee I Sing - starring Hal March and Jack Bailey

=== 1969 ===
- The Roar of the Greasepaint – The Smell of the Crowd - starring Phil Ford and Mimi Hines
- Carnival! - starring Jean-Pierre Aumont and Marisa Pavan
- Paint Your Wagon - starring Earl Wrightson
- Anything Goes - starring Gretchen Wyler
- The Most Happy Fella - starring Anna Maria Alberghetti and Edwin Steffe
- Song of Norway - starring Anne Jeffreys and Bill Hayes
- Oklahoma! - starring John Raitt

=== 1970 ===
- I Do! I Do! - starring Earl Wrightson and Lois Hunt
- Mame - starring Kaye Stevens
- Cabaret - starring Imogene Coca, Tommy Tune and King Donovan
- How Now, Dow Jones - starring Robert Q. Lewis and Selma Diamond
- Li'l Abner - starring Peter Palmer and Joy Garrett
- Funny Girl - starring Jaye P. Morgan
- Show Boat - starring Ann Blyth

=== 1971 ===
- Hello, Dolly! - starring Dorothy Lamour and Jack Bailey
- Fiddler on the Roof - starring Earl Wrightson and Lois Hunt
- George M! - starring Michael Callan
- Damn Yankees - starring Van Johnson
- Meet Me In St. Louis - starring Jane Powell
- Plain and Fancy - starring Margaret Whiting and Carl Betz
- Kismet - starring John Raitt

=== 1972 ===
- The Sound of Music - starring Ann Blyth
- Kiss Me, Kate - starring Earl Wrightson and Lois Hunt
- 1776 - starring John Raitt and Stubby Kaye
- Little Me - starring Arte Johnson and Karen Morrow
- Oliver! - starring Leonard Nimoy
- Company - starring Gretchen Wyler and Ed Evanko
- Man of La Mancha - starring Earl Wrightson

=== 1973 ===
- West Side Story - starring James Darren
- South Pacific - starring Ann Blyth
- Applause - starring Gretchen Wyler
- Wonderful Town - starring Sheila MacRae
- Promises, Promises - starring Orson Bean
- Brigadoon - starring Jane Powell
- The Music Man - starring Van Johnson

=== 1974 ===
- No, No, Nanette - starring Penny Singleton and Arthur Lake
- Finian's Rainbow - starring Arte Johnson
- Gigi - starring Earl Wrightson and Lois Hunt
- Guys and Dolls - starring George Chakiris and Rita Moreno
- Once Upon A Mattress - starring Jo Anne Worley
- Sugar - starring Orson Bean
- The King and I - starring Leonard Nimoy and Anne Jeffreys

=== 1975 ===
- Good News - starring Dorothy Collins and Carl Betz
- Annie Get Your Gun - starring John Raitt and Karen Morrow
- Bitter Sweet - starring Ann Blyth
- Zorba - starring Giorgio Tozzi
- The Unsinkable Molly Brown - starring Mimi Hines and Peter Palmer
- Gypsy - starring Margaret Whiting, Dave Madden and Linda Kaye Henning
- Camelot - starring Ed Ames

=== 1976 ===
- A Funny Thing Happened on the Way to the Forum - starring Arte Johnson and Dave Madden
- 1776 - starring Ross Martin and Stubby Kaye
- My Fair Lady - starring Leonard Nimoy
- Bells Are Ringing - starring Rita Moreno and Tab Hunter
- A Little Night Music - starring Earl Wrightson and Lois Hunt
- Shenandoah - starring John Raitt
- Irene - starring Jane Powell

=== 1977 ===
- Bye Bye Birdie - starring Lucie Arnaz and Michael Callan
- How to Succeed in Business Without Really Trying - starring Van Johnson
- The Merry Widow - starring Richard Fredricks and Linda Michele
- Follies- starring Dorothy Collins and Anne Jeffreys
- The Wizard of Oz - starring Stubby Kaye and Nancy Kulp
- The Pajama Game - starring Ruta Lee, Don Stewart and Alan Sues
- Fiddler on the Roof - starring Giorgio Tozzi

=== 1978 ===
- The Sound of Music - starring Anna Maria Alberghetti
- Peter Pan - starring Nancy Dussault and Alan Sues
- High Button Shoes - starring Monty Hall and Anne Jeffreys
- On a Clear Day You Can See Forever - starring Gene Barry and Joy Garrett
- Anything Goes - starring Jo Anne Worley
- Pippin - starring Barry Williams
- Man of La Mancha - starring John Raitt

=== 1979 ===
- Mame - starring Gretchen Wyler
- Paint Your Wagon - starring Howard Keel
- A Connecticut Yankee - starring Earl Wrightson and Lois Hunt
- The Boy Friend - starring Vivian Blaine and Don Grady
- Call Me Madam - starring Nanette Fabray
- Lullaby of Broadway - starring Johnny Desmond
- Show Boat - starring Margaret Hamilton and Ed Herlihy

=== 1980 ===
- The Wiz - starring Irene Cara and Ira Hawkins
- Where's Charley? - starring Eddie Mekka and Kitty Carlisle
- Chicago - starring Robert Mandan
- Hello, Dolly! - starring Jo Anne Worley
- South Pacific - starring Giorgio Tozzi
- Can-Can - starring Sue Ane Langdon and John Phillip Law
- The Student Prince - starring Jack Gilford
- Grease - starring Barry Williams

=== 1981 ===
- The Music Man - starring Orson Bean
- Camelot - starring Anna Maria Alberghetti
- The Unsinkable Molly Brown - starring Jane Powell
- Funny Girl - starring Mimi Hines and George Chakiris
- Oklahoma! - starring Barry Williams
- Cabaret - starring Jacqueline Schultz and Louisa Flaningam
- Shenandoah - starring Giorgio Tozzi
- The Debbie Reynolds Show - starring Debbie Reynolds

=== 1982 ===
- Guys and Dolls - starring Johnny Desmond, Sue Ane Langdon and Stubby Kaye
- West Side Story - starring Barry Williams
- Meet Me In St. Louis - starring Andrea McArdle
- Fiddler on the Roof - starring Tom Poston
- The Pirates of Penzance - starring Doug Sheehan
- Fanny - starring John Raitt
- Annie Get Your Gun - starring Jo Anne Worley

=== 1983 ===
- Barnum - starring Larry Kert
- Annie - starring Peggy Cass
- George M! - starring Eddie Mekka
- Promises, Promises - starring Desi Arnaz Jr.
- Little Me - starring Arte Johnson and Penny Singleton
- Seven Brides for Seven Brothers - starring Jason Kincaid
- They're Playing Our Song - starring Robert Walden

=== 1984 ===
- Gypsy - starring Jo Anne Worley
- Oliver! - starring Bill and Susan Seaforth Hayes
- Show Boat - starring Eddie Bracken, Stephen Lehew, Marcia King and Robert Mosley
- Joseph and the Amazing Technicolor Dreamcoat - starring Christopher Durham
- My Fair Lady - starring Noel Harrison and Christine Ebersole
- Bye Bye Birdie - starring Barry Williams
- The Sound of Music - starring Tovah Feldshuh
- The Best Little Whorehouse in Texas - starring Fannie Flagg

=== 1985 ===
- Pump Boys and Dinettes - starring Misty Rowe and Tom Nielsen
- A Chorus Line - no featured performers
- South Pacific - starring Mary Cadorette and David Holliday
- Jesus Christ Superstar - starring Peter Reckell
- The Wizard of Oz - starring Andrea McArdle
- The Desert Song - starring Stephen Lehew and Mary Ernster
- Evita - starring Christine Ebersole and Iris Lieberman (matinees)
- Amadeus - starring Bill Hayes and Christopher Durham

=== 1986 ===
- Babes in Arms - starring Iris Lieberman
- She Loves Me - starring Mary Ernster and Norman Moses
- The 1940's Radio Hour - no featured performers
- Two by Two - starring Lawrence McCauley
- Something's Afoot - starring Mary Jo Catlett
