= Robert Schuler =

Robert Schuler or Schuller may refer to:

- Robert Schuller (1926–2015), American televangelist, pastor, and author
- Robert A. Schuller (born 1954), his son, American televangelist, pastor and author
- Bobby Schuller (born 1981), son of Robert A., American televangelist and pastor
- Robert P. Shuler (1880–1965), American radio evangelist from Los Angeles
- Robert C. Schuler (1917–2007), American advertising and public-relations executive, television producer, and writer
- Bob Schuler (1943–2009), Republican Ohio state senator
