= Clark Jones =

American television director

- Born: April 10, 1920; Clearfield, Pennsylvania
- Died: March 28, 2002 (aged 81); Key West, Florida
- Occupation: Television director
- Years active: 1949–1986

Clark Jones (April 10, 1920 – March 28, 2002) was an American television director. He gained acclaim in the early days of television as a director of live programming.

He began working in television at an experimental station in 1941. During the 1950s, directed numerous musical and variety programs, including Your Hit Parade, a precedent-breaking closed circuit broadcast of the Metropolitan Opera, The Ford 50th Anniversary Show, Caesar's Hour, the award-winning 1955 television broadcast of Peter Pan, and the Royal Ballet's performance of Cinderella.

During the 1960s, he continued to specialize in variety and music programs, including The Perry Como Show, The Bell Telephone Hour, The Sammy Davis Jr. Show, and The Carol Burnett Show. In the later years of his career, he was known principally for his direction of special event programming, including two Frank Sinatra specials and 19 Tony Award award ceremonies. Over the course of his television career, Jones was nominated for nine Primetime Emmy Awards and three Directors Guild of America Awards.

== Early years ==
Jones was born in Clearfield, Pennsylvania, in 1920. He attended Northwestern University. He worked at an experimental television station in Schenectady, New York, in 1941. During World War II, he served in the Signal Corps.

== Television career ==
=== Early career ===
After World War II, Jones moved to New York City and began working as a director on early television shows that included Voice of the People and One Man's Family. In 1949, he directed an NBC jazz show that was originally called the Floor Show and later renamed the Eddie Condon Video Show. The shows featured performances by jazz musician and bandleader Eddie Condon and guest stars, including Billie Holiday, Louis Armstrong, Jack Teagarden, and Earl Hines. For one episode, he worked on a novel idea of preparing a special script depicting Holiday's life story.

=== Your Hit Parade ===
In 1951, he became the director of the television show Your Hit Parade, a popular show in which a regular cast of singers performed the weeks top hits, sometimes in elaborate productions. Ed Sullivan in October 1952 called Jones' direction one of the keys to the show's "professional savvy." He continued as the regular director of the Hit Parade until 1954. He received his first Emmy nomination in 1955 for best television director for his work on the program.

=== Carmen and the Ford Show ===
By the fall of 1952, Jones had built a reputation as "one of the most imaginative and creative of all TV directors today." While working on Your Hit Parade, he also directed several special event programs. In November 1952, he directed "a precedent-breaking" performance of Carmen by the Metropolitan Opera. Cameras were placed in the "Diamond Horeshoe" boxes to capture a production that featured a 92-piece orchestra and as many as 120 persons on stage at the same time> It broadcast live via closed circuit to movie screens across the country.

In June 1953, Jones took a two-week leave of absence from Your Hit Parade to direct The Ford 50th Anniversary Show. The Ford show was a two-hour special broadcast simultaneously on both NBC and CBS and involved the coordination of three studios, eight cameras, 45 engineers, 25 stagehands, a 24-piece orchestra, and a large cast. Forty years after the broadcast, television critic Tom Shales recalled the broadcast as both "a landmark in television" and "a milestone in the cultural life of the '50s." He called it "the most stupendous" in an era of "super special shows." Jones himself described it as "the very first television spectacular" and "the most exciting show" he ever did.

=== Mid to late 1950s ===
In the fall of 1954, Jones began directing for Caesar's Hour, a popular comedy and variety show. He directed at least 20 episodes of Caesar's Hour From 1954 to 1956.

Jones also directed several episodes of Producers' Showcase between 1955 and 1957. The most successful was the March 1955 television broadcast of Peter Pan starring Mary Martin. Jones took over as director from Jerome Robbins who directed the show on Broadway and received his second Emmy nomination for the project. Jones' other projects for Producers' Showcase included a musical adaptation of Jack and the Beanstalk (1956) starring Joel Grey and the Royal Ballet's April 1957 performance of Prokofiev's Cinderella.

During the 1957-58 season, Jones directed The Patrice Munsel Show, a variety show starring opera singer Patrice Munsel. Jones received his third Emmy for his work on that series.

=== 1960s ===
In 1958, Jones began directing the Perry Como Show, later known as Perry Como's Kraft Music Hall. He received his fourth Emmy nomination in 1959 for Best Direction of a Single Musical Or Variety Program for his work on an episode of Como's show featuring Maureen O'Hara and Robert Preston. Jones also served as producer of Como's show in the late 1950s. His association with the Como show continued until 1967, though his work was limited to specials in the later years.

From 1960 to 1967, Jones also directed The Bell Telephone Hour, a concert series featuring performances by stars of opera, musical theater and ballet. He also directed The Sammy Davis Jr. Show in 1966, but it was cancelled after a three-month run.

In 1967, Jones moved to Los Angeles to direct the first season of The Carol Burnett Show. He left the show after the first season to return to New York. For his work on the show, he was nominated for a Directors Guild of America Award (DGA Award) for Outstanding Directorial Achievement in Television.

=== Special events ===
Jones also remained in demand during the 1960s for musical specials, directing Dinah Shore and Robert Goulet specials in 1964, and two Carol Channing specials in 1969. He also directed two Frank Sinatra specials: Francis Albert Sinatra Does His Thing in 1968, and Frank Sinatra: The Man and His Music (1981). He was nominated for a DGA Award for the second Sinatra special.

Jones also directed the 1982 broadcast of Night of 100 Stars and its 1984 sequel Night of 100 Stars II. He received Emmy nominations for both productions.

In 1967, Jones began a 20-year association with the Tony Awards. He directed the television broadcast of the award ceremony 19 times between 1967 and 1986. He was twice nominated for Emmy Awards and once for a DGA Award for his handling of the Tony Awards. He also directed other award ceremonies and pageants, including the Emmy Awards and the Miss Universe and Miss USA pageants.

== Later years ==
Jones died in 2002 at his home in Key West, Florida. He was survived by his partner, Paul Daniel.

== Awards ==
Jones was nominated for multiple awards including the following:

- 1955 - Emmy nomination, Best Direction for Your Hit Parade
- 1956 - Emmy nomination, Best Director - Live Series for Producers' Showcase, Peter Pan
- 1958 - Emmy nomination, Best Direction - Half Hour or Less for The Patrice Munsel Show
- 1959 - Emmy nomination, Best Direction of a Single Musical or Variety Program, The Perry Como Show, episode with Maureen O'Hara and Robert Preston
- 1964 - Emmy nomination, Outstanding Directorial Achievement in Variety or Music, The Bell Telephone Hour (1959)
- 1968 - DGA Award nomination, Outstanding Directorial Achievement in Television for The Carol Burnett Show
- 1978 - Emmy nomination, Outstanding Achievement in Coverage of Special Events for 32nd Tony Awards
- 1982 - Emmy nomination, Outstanding Directing in a Variety or Music Program, Night of 100 Stars (1982)
- 1982 - DGA Award nominee, Outstanding Directorial Achievement in Musical/Variety for Frank Sinatra: The Man and His Music (1981)
- 1982 - DGA Award nominee, Outstanding Directorial Achievement in Actuality for the 35th Tony Awards (1981)
- 1983 - DGA Award nominee, Outstanding Directorial Achievement in Musical/Variety for Night of 100 Stars
- 1984 - Emmy nomination, Outstanding Directing in a Variety or Music Program for the 38th Tony Awards
- 1985 - Emmy nomination, Outstanding Directing in a Variety or Music Program for Night of 100 Stars II (1985)

== Selected directing credits ==
- Voice of the People
- Floor Show / Eddie Condon Video Show (1949)
- The Clock (1951)
- Curtain Call (1952)
- Your Hit Parade (1952-1954)
- Carmen (1952)
- The Ford 50th Anniversary Show (1953)
- Caesar's Hour (1954-1956)
- Producers' Showcase (1955-1957)

Peter Pan (1955)
Cinderella (1957)

- Omnibus (1956)
- The Patrice Munsel Show (1957-1958) (Emmy nomination)
- The Perry Como Show / Kraft Music Hall (1958-1966)
- The Bell Telephone Hour (1960-1967)
- Dinah Shore Special (1964)
- An Hour with Robert Goulet (1964)
- The Sammy Davis Jr. Show (1966)
- Carol and Company (1966)
- Annie Get Your Gun (1967)
- Tony Awards (1967, 1969-1986)
- The Carol Burnett Show (1967-1968)
- Francis Albert Sinatra Does His Thing (1968)
- Carol Channing and Pearl Bailey: On Broadway (1969)
- Carol Channing Proudly Presents the Seven Deadly Sins (1969)
- Peggy Fleming at Madison Square Garden (1969)
- Jimmy Durante Presents the Lennon Sisters (1970)
- A World of Love (1970)
- An Evening with Marlene Dietrich (1973)
- The Real George Carlin (1973)
- 1975 - Twigs (1975)
- Primetime Emmy Awards (1978, 1982)
- Miss Universe Pageant (1978, 1980)
- Miss USA Pageant (1979, 1980) (DGA Award nominee")
- Frank Sinatra: The Man and His Music (1981) (DGA Award nominee)
- Night of 100 Stars (1982)
- Parade of Stars (1983)
- NBC 60th Anniversary Celebration (1986)
