= Jack and the Beanstalk (Producers' Showcase) =

- Producers' Showcase episode
- Joel Grey in "Jack and the Beanstalk"
- Original air date: November 12, 1956

"Jack and the Beanstalk" was an American television play broadcast on November 12, 1956, as part of the NBC television series, Producers' Showcase.

== Plot ==
The production revived the fairy tale of a boy who trades the family's cow for a handful of magic beans. It included new characters and 11 original songs.

== Cast ==
The following performers received screen credit for their performances:

- Joel Grey as Jack
- Celeste Holm as Mad Maggie
- Cyril Ritchard as The Peddler
- Peggy King as Tillie Hemmelpacker
- Arnold Stang as Mr. Fum
- Leora Dana as The Widow Tooper
- Billy Gilbert as Mr. Poopledoop
- Dennis King as Narrator

== Production ==
Clark Jones was the director and Mort Abrahams was the executive producer. It was written by Helen Deutsch. The music was by Jerry Livingston with lyrics by Helen Deutsch.

== Reception ==
In The New York Times, Jack Gould that the production had plenty of sets and stars but lacked "the spirit of make-believe" and "only achieved an intermittent glow." He also noted that Joel Grey was "much too old for the part."

Bob Blackburn called it "sickeningly moral and harmless."
