= The Firebrand of Florence =

Operetta in two acts by Kurt Weill

- Earl Wrightson as Cellini and Beverly Tyler as Angela
- Music: Kurt Weill
- Lyrics: Ira Gershwin
- Book: Edwin Justus Mayer; Ira Gershwin
- Basis: Edwin Justus Mayer's play
- Productions: 1945 Broadway

The Firebrand of Florence is a Broadway operetta in two acts, written by Kurt Weill (music), Ira Gershwin (lyrics), and Edwin Justus Mayer and Gershwin (book), based on Mayer's play. The show opened at the Alvin Theatre (now the Neil Simon) on March 22, 1945, and closed on April 28 that year after 43 performances. The original production was directed by John Murray Anderson, choreographed by Catherine Littlefield, and conducted by Maurice Abravanel; it featured Lotte Lenya as Duchess.

In 2017, Kim H. Kowalke and John Baxindine conceived a suite of dances from The Firebrand of Florence named Much Ado about Love (the original title of the show) which was performed at the Brevard Music Center, conducted by Keith Lockhart.

== Plot ==
=== Act 1 ===
Florence, 1535. Sculptor Benvenuto Cellini has been sentenced to hang for the attempted murder of Count Maffio ("When the Bell of Doom is Clanging"). The people of Florence gather in the public square, gaily celebrating the hanging ("Come to Florence"). On the gallows, the unrepentant, rakish Cellini says it's been a good life anyway ("Life, Love, and Laughter"). Suddenly Alessandro, Duke of Florence, pardons Cellini, because the statue of a nymph he commissioned from the sculptor has not been finished yet, though Alessandro has already paid for it. Walking away from the scaffold, Cellini is set upon by Maffio; this time he kills him (or so it seems).

Back at Cellini's workshop, his apprentice Ascanio and servant Emilia rejoice in the reprieve ("Our Master Is Free Again"), as Cellini presents an embellished version of his latest duel with Maffio ("I Had Just Been Pardoned"). He resumes work on the statue, but he has trouble concentrating because of his attraction to his model, Angela. Angela reciprocates the attraction but with reservations ("You're Far Too Near Me"). The French ambassador enters, telling Cellini that the Duke intends to hang him for Maffio's murder, and suggesting that he flee to Paris, where the king wants him to decorate Fontainebleau. But before Cellini can bolt, Duke Alessandro arrives ("Alessandro the Wise") to ogle Angela. The Duke decides to carry off Angela to his summer palace, and he puts Cellini under house arrest (Finaletto).

Cellini escapes his guards and hurries to the summer palace to rescue Angela. He accidentally encounters Alessandro's wife, the Duchess of Florence ("Entrance of the Duchess") on her way to Pisa. The Duchess makes no secret of her yen for Cellini, and she's not interested in romance, just sex ("Sing Me Not a Ballad"). The two plan an assignation for later. Next Cellini encounters the Duke's cousin, Ottaviano, who demands that he conspire to kill the Duke, but Cellini refuses, and Ascanio helps him escape. At the summer palace, the Duke exults in the opportunity to have his way with Angela ("While the Duchess is Away"). But Cellini has sneaked in, and he eavesdrops as the Duke makes his move. The Duke senses Cellini's presence and is unnerved, and his attempt at seduction degenerates into spoonerisms ("The Nosy Cook"). Cellini emerges, and a commotion ensues during which Cellini escapes with Angela and the Duchess unexpectedly returns, to the Duke's chagrin. The act concludes in a merry tarantella.

=== Act 2 ===
Back in Florence at Cellini's workshop, Benvenuto and Angela finally consummate their passion. But they bicker the following morning, and when a missive from the Duchess arrives ("The Duchess's Letter") inviting Cellini to decorate the summer palace, he sets his mind on the Duchess rather than Angela. Cellini's inconstancy aggrieves Angela, who blames it all on Cupid ("The Little Naked Boy"). Meanwhile, at the city palace, the guards always have their spears at the ready ("Just in Case"). Inside the palace, the Duke schemes to woo Angela by writing her a love poem, but he cannot come up with "A Rhyme for Angela." When he learns that Cellini has taken Angela away, the Duke again threatens to hang him, but the Duchess persuades him to put him on trial first.

The people of Florence gather in a carnival atmosphere once again ("Hear Ye!"). The judges read the charges against Cellini ("The World is Full of Villains") but Cellini protests that his past behavior, like everyone else's, is predetermined by the stars ("You Have to Do What You Do Do"). For a moment the Duke is amused by this, sensing that this astrological alibi covers his own amatory transgressions. Then Ottaviano testifies that Cellini conspired to kill the Duke. Just when Cellini appears doomed, Ascanio testifies that it was really Ottaviano who was plotting against the Duke ("How Wonderfully Fortunate"), and the Duchess supports the accusation. So the Duke again reverses himself, arresting Ottaviano and pardoning Cellini. Now Cellini decides to accept the commission to redecorate Fontainebleau. For the greater glory of art and posterity ("Love is My Enemy"), he swears off both the Duchess and Angela, while they commiserate with each other ("The Little Naked Boy" reprise).

The scene shifts to Fontainebleau ("Come to Paris") where Cellini, deprived of Angela as a model/muse, has a bad case of "sculptor's block." Suddenly the Duke and Duchess of Florence arrive, with Angela in tow. Cellini reconciles with Angela. Finally he finishes and unveils his nymph statue, as commedia dell'arte players perform a motley dance. Bizarrely, Maffio reappears—he had not been killed after all. As Cellini and Maffio draw their swords, a spirit of gaiety lights up the stage in a final reprise of "Life, Love, and Laughter."

=== Scenes ===
- Act 1
  - Scene 1: A Public Square in Florence. Time: 1535.
  - Scene 2: Cellini's Workshop
  - Scene 3: The City Gates
  - Scene 4: The Garden of the Summer Palace
- Act 2
  - Scene 1: Cellini's Workshop
  - Scene 2: Outside the City Palace
  - Scene 3: A Loggia in the City Palace
  - Scene 4: The Grand Council Chamber at the Palace
  - Scene 5: The Palace of the King of France

=== Songs ===
Act 1

- Overture
- Opening Act 1:
  - When the Bell of Doom is Clanging
  - Come to Florence
  - Life, Love, and Laughter
- Our Master is Free Again
- I Had Just Been Pardoned
- You're Far Too Near Me
- Alessandro the Wise
- Finaletto ("I Am Happy Here")
- Entrance of the Duchess
- Sing Me Not a Ballad
- When the Duchess is Away
- The Nosy Cook
- Act 1 Finale (Tarantella)

Act 2

- Entr'acte
- The Duchess's Letter
- The Little Naked Boy
- March of the Soldiers of the Duchy (Just in Case)
- A Rhyme for Angela
- Trial Scene:
  - Hear Ye!
  - The World is Full of Villains
  - You Have to Do What You Do Do
  - How Wonderfully Fortunate!
- Love Is My Enemy
- The Little Naked Boy (Reprise)
- Come to Paris
- Finale (Reprise: Life, Love, and Laughter)

== Recordings ==
- Rod Gilfry, Lori Ann Fuller, George Dvorsky, Simon Russell Beale, BBC Symphony Orchestra, conductor: Sir Andrew Davis; Capriccio Records 60 091
- Kurt Weill on Broadway: Thomas Hampson, Elizabeth Futral, Jerry Hadley, London Sinfonietta, conductor: John McGlinn [excerpts]; EMI Classics 5 55563 2
