= Robert C. Schuler =

American entertainment executive (1917–2007)

Robert Charles Schuler
- Born: April 30, 1917; Winona, Minnesota, United States
- Died: December 25, 2007 (aged 90); New York, United States
- Occupations: Advertising & public relations executive; producer; writer
- Spouse: Patrice Munsel

Robert Charles Schuler (April 30, 1917 – December 25, 2007) was an American advertising and public-relations executive, television producer and writer. He is best known for creating and producing the ABC-TV primetime variety series The Patrice Munsel Show. Schuler was married to Munsel for more than five decades.

== Biography ==
Born in Winona, Minnesota, Schuler studied at St. Mary's College, the University of Minnesota and Northwestern University. He was an active member of the Alpha Tau Omega fraternity. Schuler also studied acting at Max Reinhardt's School of the Theatre in Hollywood and with Lee Strasberg at the American Theatre Wing.

Schuler first worked as an advertising copy writer for Sears Roebuck in Chicago. Since he disliked the cold weather, he quit his job and moved to California. He ended up living in an artist colony in Malibu where he founded the Malibu Theatre. He tried to make a career as a film actor, landing small uncredited roles for MGM, Columbia and Universal during the late 1930s and early 1940s.

Schuler eventually gave up his acting career and took a position as Assistant Advertising Manager at Western Airlines. He returned to work in entertainment in the late 1940s, notably as the Associate Producer of the 1947 Broadway play, Laura. He then became a Director and TV Casting Director for Young & Rubicam. He later became the president of the public relations firm, Celebrity International, Inc. in New York City, serving in that position for fifteen years.

In 1952 Schuler married renowned opera singer Patrice Munsel. During their marriage of fifty-five years they had four children together: Heidi, Rhett, Scott and Nicole. Schuler conceived and produced the ABC-TV primetime variety series The Patrice Munsel Show, which starred his wife. The program was broadcast on ABC in 1957–1958. He wrote a 2005 memoir of his life with his wife entitled The Diva & I. Schuler also wrote eight travel books entitled The Little Book: Dare to Do It Yourself series. He was a frequent contributor to Details during the 1980s and early 1990s.

For a number of years, Schuler and Munsel lived in Flower Hill, New York.

Schuler died on Christmas Day 2007 at his home in the Adirondack Mountains in New York.
