= Louis J. Camuti =

- Born: August 30, 1893; Parma, Italy
- Died: February 24, 1981 (aged 87); New York City
- Notable work: All My Patients Are Under The Bed: Memoirs of a Cat Doctor

Louis J. Camuti (August 30, 1893 – February 24, 1981) was a New York City cat veterinarian who made housecalls on cats and their people for over sixty years. He was the first veterinarian in the United States to devote his entire practice to cats. Camuti co-authored two books, Park Avenue Vet with Lloyd Alexander, published in 1962, and his autobiography, All My Patients Are Under The Bed: Memoirs of a Cat Doctor with Marilyn and Haskel Frankel, published in 1980.

== Biography ==
Camuti was born in Parma, Italy, on August 30, 1893, and grew up in Manhattan, New York.

He is a 1920 graduate of the New York University Veterinary College, after studying at Cornell University.

When Camuti was about 11 years old, he had typhoid fever, and while sick in bed, his mother left the house with food cooking on the stove. When the pot boiled over, gas began to fill the home. The family cat jumped onto young Camuti's chest and weaved her head back and forth. The young Camuti was too weak to get out of bed, and felt the cat's efforts may have saved his life.

Camuti began specializing in cat medicine around 1932–33. At the time, veterinarians did not spend much time providing services to cats. Camuti appeared on The Tonight Show Starring Johnny Carson in 1962.

Camuti died of a heart attack while travelling to see a patient.

== Memorial fund ==
Former patients and friends honor Camuti's commitment to the health of cats through the Dr. Louis J. Camuti Memorial Fund at the Cornell University College of Veterinary Medicine's Feline Health Center, which commemorates Camuti's specialty.

== Bibliography ==
- Camuti, Louis J.; Alexander, Lloyd (1962). Park Avenue Vet. New York: Holt, Rinehart and Winston. ASIN B0000CLL93.
- Camuti, Louis J.; Haskel, Marilyn; Frankel, Haskel (1980). All My Patients Are Under The Bed: Memoirs of a Cat Doctor. New York: Simon and Schuster. ISBN 978-0-671-24271-8.; also published as: Alle meine Patienten sind unterm Bett: Erinnerungen des Katzendoktors (in German). Translated by Mertz-Rychner, Claudia. München: Blanvalet. 1980. ISBN 978-3-7645-3185-0.
