= John Diebold =

American businessman (1926–2005)

John T. Diebold
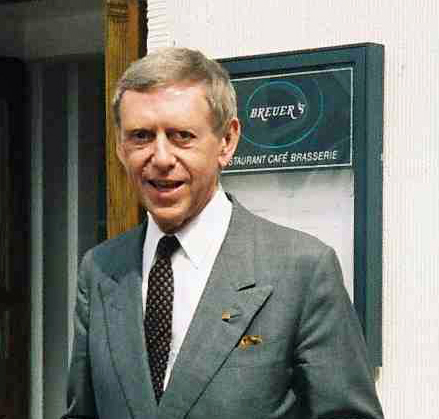
- Born: June 8, 1926; Weehawken, New Jersey, United States
- Died: December 26, 2005 (aged 79); Bedford Hills, New York, United States
- Education: Harvard Business School, MBA; Swarthmore College, BA; United States Merchant Marine Academy, BS in Engineering
- Spouse(s): Doris Hackett (m. 1951; div. 1975) Vanessa VonderPorten (m. 1982)
- Children: Dr. Joan Diebold; Emma Diebold; John Diebold

John Theurer Diebold (June 8, 1926 – December 26, 2005) was an American businessman who was a pioneer in the field of automation, founding The Diebold Group to advise corporations around the world as well as governments in the U.S and abroad in the potential of information technology.

== Early life ==
Diebold was born on June 8, 1926, in Weehawken, New Jersey. After graduating from Weehawken High School, he enrolled at Swarthmore College, then during the war attended the United States Merchant Marine Academy and served in the merchant marine, returning to Swarthmore in 1946 to earn a B.S. in Engineering. He then completed an MBA at the Harvard Business School in 1951.

At the Harvard Business School he worked with venture-capital pioneer Georges Doriot and his colleague Curtis Tarr, who advised Diebold's research project on "Making the Automatic Factory a Reality". Diebold made automation studies the focus of his assignments for a small Chicago-based consulting firm, then in 1954 he returned to Weehawken to found his own consulting company. By 1960, he numbered more than 30 prominent clients including such notable companies as Bear, Sterns & Company; Boeing Airplane; General Electric, Radio Corporation of America; Westinghouse Electric; and others.

Diebold's first book, Automation: The Advent of the Automatic Factory, based on his studies at the Harvard Business School, was published by Van Nostrand in 1952. Owing to independent research and ever-persistent curiosity about the whole field of technology, he originated many of the concepts of data processing and utilization that are accepted today in both automation and management. This book was reissued unchanged on its 30th anniversary as a “management classic” by the American Management Association. He is credited with coining the word automation in its present meaning, and had much to do with introducing it to general usage.

== Career summary ==
1952 wrote first book, Automation, originating many concepts basic in today's technology.

1954 founded John Diebold & Associates, consulting in automation and management; later known as The Diebold Group, the international management consulting firm. It was sold to Daimler-Benz in 1991.

1968 founded The Diebold Institute for Public Policy Studies, an operating foundation to apply advanced computer and communications technology to the improvement of the quality of life for a broad segment of the public. In 2005, the year of his death, the Institute led an international cooperative effort to assess the value of information technology in public infrastructures: health care; road transportation; education; communications and public safety.

== Business career ==
John Diebold & Associates soon grew into The Diebold Group, which played a role in the development of the information technology industry. John Diebold and his company were responsible for the creation of new products and services as well as in the definition of the IT role in the management of businesses and governments. His original wish to play a role in and to contribute to the development of a few of the formative issues that changes the world was fulfilled.

From the firm's founding in 1954, Diebold positioned himself as both a leadership theorist and an early advocate for the transformative potential of computing. He argued that computers represented more than the mechanization of existing systems, contending that they would enable fundamentally new capabilities and opportunities.

Only a few years after the Diebold Group's founding, books were being written about John Diebold, his ideas and his firm.

Central to all of this was the insight that for computers to achieve their potential they had to be viewed as management and strategy tools. The firm's leadership was evident not only in technical innovations but also in the highest level of strategic planning.

From its founding to its sale in 1991, the firm and John Diebold had a continuing role in the creation and dissemination of new ideas, insights and the introduction of new paradigms. An example was the concepts that talent is capital and its consequences were a key to success in the new world that took shape.

From the beginning Diebold contributed to new expectations for the delivery of public services and to what citizens could expect from governments.

The firm provided counsel to over 100 cities, most U.S. states, several foreign governments and major corporations, in the U.S. and abroad.

John Diebold was active in public as well as private pursuits. He was a trustee of the Carnegie Institution of Washington, the Committee for Economic Development, the National Planning Association, a Fellow of the International Academy of Management, a Member, Executive Committee, the Public Agenda Foundation; Chairman, U.S.East Asian History of Science and Vice Chairman of the Academy for Educational Development.

He also served as Vice Chairman to John J. McCloy at the American Council on Germany. He had six honorary degrees, the Legion of Honor from France and was decorated by the governments of Italy, Germany and Jordan. He also received numerous professional awards.

== Books ==
- Automation: The advent of the Automatic Factory, Van Nostrand, 1952
- Making the future work: Unleashing our powers of innovation for the decades ahead, Simon and Schuster, 1984
- Managing Information: The Challenge and the Opportunity, 1985

The Papers and Speeches of John Diebold, 1957-1998

- Volume 1. Beyond Automation: Managerial Problems of an Exploding Technology. Foreword: Peter F. Drucker. McGraw Hill, 1964; Republished by PraegerPublishers, 1970
- Volume 2. Man and the Computer: Technology as an Agent of Social Change, Frederick A. Praeger, 1969
- Volume 3. Business Decisions and Technological Change, Praeger Publisher, 1970
- Volume 4. The Role of Business in Society. Foreword by James L. Hayes, Chairman, American Management Associations. American Management Associations, 1982
- Volume 5. Managing Information: The Challenge and the Opportunity, Foreword by Thornton F. Bradshaw, Chairman, RCA Corporation. American Management Associations, 1985
- Volume 6. Business in the Age of Information. Foreword by Russell Palmer, Dean, The Wharton School. American Management Associations, 1985
- Volume 7. Technology and Public Policy. Meeting Society's 21st Century Needs. Management Science Publishing Co., 1997
- Volume 8. Maintaining Profitability in an Increasingly Complex Environment. Management Science Publishing Co., 1998
- Volume 9. Information Technology in the 21st Century, Management Science Publishing Co., 1998

Editor, World of the Computer, for Random House in 1973

== Additional references ==
- Managerial Innovations of John Diebold. An Analysis of Their Content and Dissemination by Mary Stephens-Caldwell Henderson, LeBaron Foundation, 1966
- John Diebold. Breaking the Confines of the Possible by Wilbur Cross. The Future Makers. James H. Heineman, 1965
- Agent of Change. Forty Years of the Diebold Group Edited by Liesa Bing and Ralph E. Weindling. Diebold Institute for Public Policy Studies, 2001
- The John Diebold Lectures by David W. Ewing. Harvard University Press.
- Computer visionary John Diebold dies by Richard Waters. Financial Times. December 28, 2005. Accessed September 29, 2013
- John Diebold on management by Carl Heyel, Prentice Hall, 1972
- Other People’s Business by Howard Klein, Mason/Charter Publishers, 1976. John Diebold and his firm are principal subject in book.
- Starting at the Top by John Mack Carter and Joan Feeney. William Morrow & Co., 1985. John Diebold one of subjects in book.

== Archives and records ==
- John Diebold papers at Baker Library Special Collections, Harvard Business School.
- The Diebold Group, Client Reports at Charles Babbage Institute, University of Minnesota. Contains nearly 1000 client reports (1954-1990), prepared for the Diebold Group's corporate clients, government, and other public clients. The reports assess whether and how companies can make use of computers, sometimes including specific recommendations for computer purchases based on predictions for automation in a particular industry.
