= Micki Marlo =

American singer and model (1928–2016)

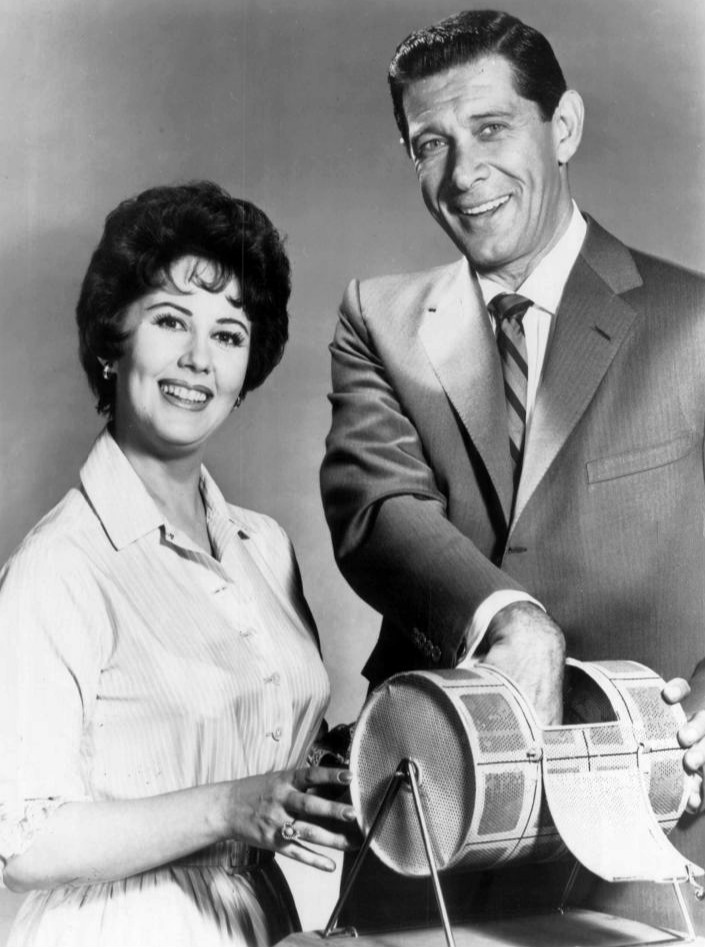
- Marlo and Jan Murray on Charge Account, 1961.
- Born: August 12, 1928; Philadelphia, Pennsylvania, U.S.
- Died: September 20, 2016 (aged 88); Dade County, Florida, U.S.
- Occupation: Singer

Micki Marlo (August 12, 1928 – September 20, 2016) was an American singer and model, best known in the 1950s, who received attention for both her singing and her beauty.

She was a member of WPEN Philadelphia's "950 Club", a radio precursor of American Bandstand. She worked the variety show circuit in the 1950s, appearing on the original Tonight Show with Steve Allen. Micki was a member of the cast of Ziegfeld Follies of 1957

== Recordings ==
She recorded a duet with Paul Anka, "What You've Done To Me" in 1957. Her ABC-Paramount album, Married I Can Always Get, featured her on the cover in a photo wearing a low-cut, bare-shouldered wedding dress. The liner notes make frequent references to her physical charms. "Little By Little", a Nappy Brown cover, was her only hit.

== Latter years work ==
In the early 1960s she appeared on the game show Charge Account, and paired up with Ed Hurst again to co-host Summer Time On The Pier, another live dance show, this time from Atlantic City, New Jersey, for WRCV-TV.

== Death ==
Marlo died in Dade County, Florida, on September 20, 2016, at the age of 88.
