= The Patrice Munsel Show (TV series) =

American TV variety series (1957–1958)

- Written by: Larry Gelbart
- Directed by: Clark Jones
- Starring: Patrice Munsel
- Theme music composer: Hugh Martin
- Opening theme: "Breezy and Easy"
- Country of origin: United States

Production
- Executive producer: Robert Shuler
- Producer: Clark Jones
- Production company: M-S Productions

Original release
- Network: ABC
- Release: October 18, 1957 – June 13, 1958

The Patrice Munsel Show is an American television variety show that was broadcast on ABC from October 18, 1957, until June 13, 1958.

== Program ==
Soprano Patrice Munsel, known for her performances with the Metropolitan Opera, starred in this live program. Other regulars were The Martins Quartet and the Charles Sanford Orchestra. Episodes also featured guest stars. Munsel sang popular songs, show tunes, and excerpts from operas and did comedy sketches with guests. She said: "We wanted a show with a basic theme each week, a show with a thread that the audience could follow. It's a matter of giving a viewer not what we think he should get at a specific moment, but what he naturally would want at that moment."

Guests on the show included Robert Merrill, Buddy Hackett, Vic Damone, Martha Raye, Kay Thompson, Eddie Albert, Tony Bennett, John Raitt, and Andy Williams. Nanette Fabray replaced Munsel on the November 8, 1957, episode.

== Production ==
Robert Shuler (Munsel's husband) was the executive producer for M-S Productions, which was founded by Munsel and Shuler. Clark Jones was the producer and director. Writers included Larry Gelbart. Hugh Martin arranged vocal numbers and was the show's musical director.

Broadcast live, the show initially was seen on Fridays from 8:30 to 9 p.m. Eastern Time; on January 3, 1958, it was moved to 9:30 to 10 p.m. E.T., still on Fridays. It originated from WABC-TV in New York City.

The theme was "Breezy and Easy", composed by Martin. Buick and Frigidaire were the sponsors.

The Patrice Munsel Show replaced Crossroads. The program's competition initially included Dick Powell's Zane Grey Theatre and The Life of Riley. After the time shift, Schlitz Playhouse of Stars and The Thin Man competed with it.

== Critical response ==
A review of the premiere episode in the trade publication Variety called it "probably the best" of all of "the avalanche of varieties this season." The review complimented Munsel's singing, dancing, banter, and wardrobe. It also praised the work of the show's off-camera personnel and concluded by saying that the show was "a Munsel menu to brighten any home."
