= John W. Bubbles =

American dancer, musician, and actor (1902–1986)

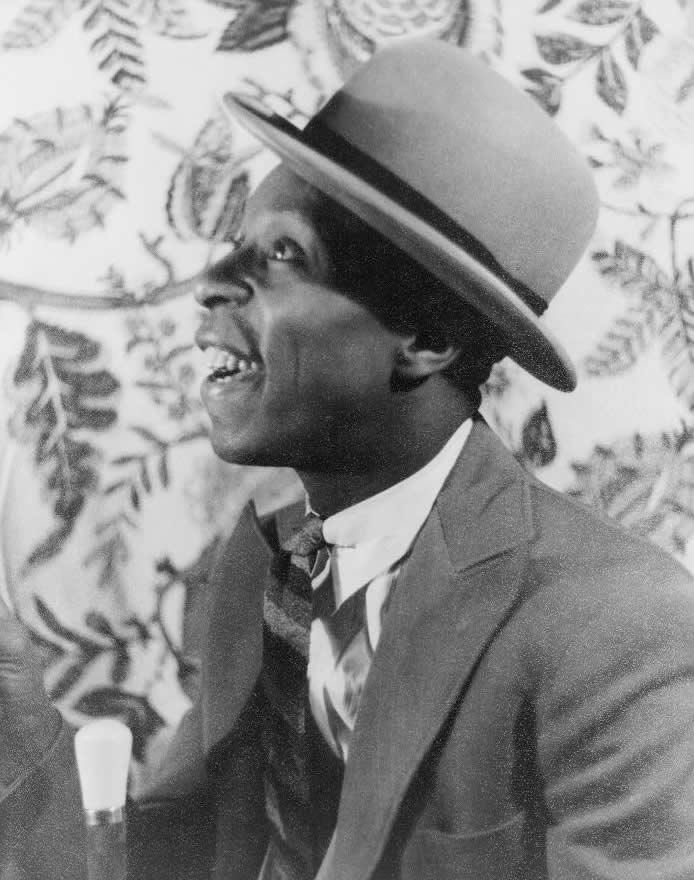
- Portrait (as Sportin' Life in Porgy and Bess) by Carl Van Vechten, 1935 Dec. 27.
- Born: John William Sublett; February 19, 1902; Louisville, Kentucky, U.S.
- Died: May 18, 1986 (aged 84); Baldwin Hills, California, U.S.
- Occupations: Vaudeville performer and tap dancer

John William Sublett (February 19, 1902 – May 18, 1986), known by his stage name John W. Bubbles, was an American tap dancer, vaudevillian, movie actor, and television performer. He performed in the duo "Buck and Bubbles", who were the first black artists to appear on television in history (from Alexandra Palace, London in 1936). He is known as the father of "rhythm tap."

== Life and career ==
Sublett was born in Louisville, Kentucky, on February 19, 1902, but soon moved with his family to Indianapolis. There, he formed a partnership with Ford L. "Buck" Washington in 1919. Their duo was known as "Buck and Bubbles." Buck played stride piano and sang, and Bubbles tapped along. They were so popular that the duo moved to Manhattan, New York City in September of that year. They played together in the Columbia Theater, the Palace and later played with artists Al Jolson, Eddie Cantor and Danny Kaye. They also played at the Apollo Theater in Harlem.

They appeared in Lew Leslie's Blackbirds in 1930 at the Royale Theatre. This was followed by performances in the Ziegfeld Follies of 1931 at the Ziegfeld Theatre. They also became the first black artists to perform at the Radio City Music Hall. "Buck and Bubbles" performed live in the first scheduled 'high definition' (240-line) television program on November 2, 1936, at Alexandra Palace, London, for the BBC, becoming the first black artists on television anywhere in the world.

Other work on Broadway included the roles of Scipio in Arthur Schwartz's Virginia (1937) and Rum in Oscar Hammerstein II's Carmen Jones (1946).

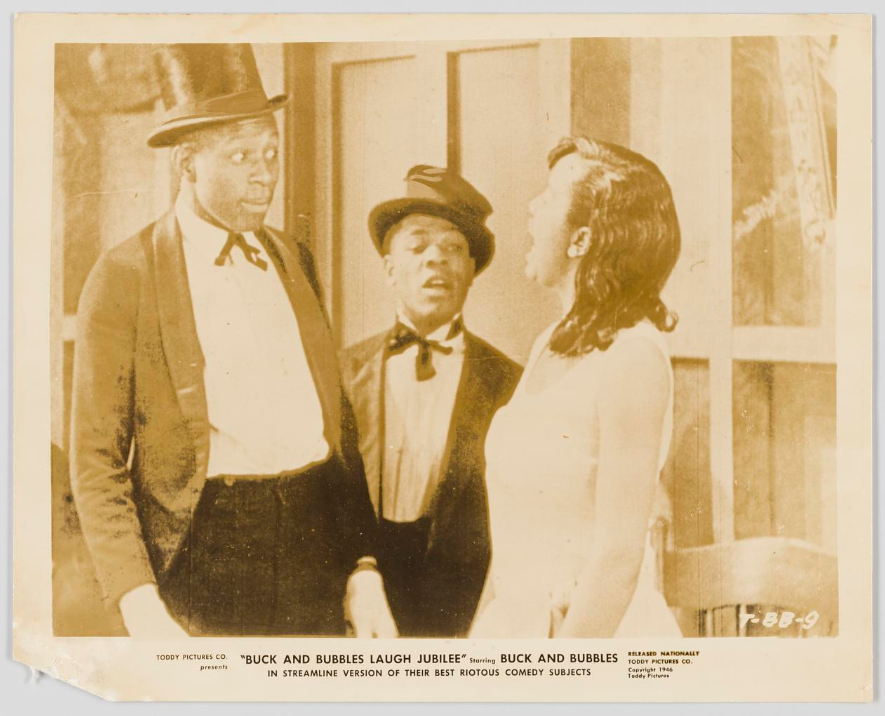
Buck and Bubbles in a movie still

Though unable to read music, Bubbles was chosen by George Gershwin to create the role of Sportin' Life in his opera Porgy and Bess in 1935. Since he didn't understand the music score, Gershwin spent the time to teach it to him as a tap rhythm. Sublett caused some problems because he often made up rhythms which caused confusion with other members of the cast. Sublett performed the role occasionally for the next two decades.

In 1963, in a studio recording of Porgy and Bess featuring Leontyne Price and William Warfield, he performed Sportin' Life's two main arias from the opera, "It Ain't Necessarily So" and "There's A Boat Dat's Leavin' Soon For New York".

In 1920, he gave tap dance lessons to Fred Astaire, who considered Sublett the finest tap dancer of his generation. In the number "Bojangles of Harlem" from Swing Time (1936), Astaire dresses in blackface as the Sportin' Life character and dances in the style of Sublett while ostensibly paying tribute to Bill Robinson.

There has long been a widespread misattribution that Sublett was Ethel Waters' uncredited dancing partner in the historic film On with the Show! (1929). However, the pressbook for the film makes it clear that the dancer was Angelus Babe, providing a bio and two photographs. In 2011, Ryan Friedman, supplying no support for his belief that Sublett was the dancer, surmised that "Angelus Babe" was a pseudonym, and published this in a book. The misinformation has multiplied. That Angelus Babe was a real person is shown by a search on the on-line archive of the Los Angeles Times, where he is mentioned seven times. There is also confirmation in the catalog of the American Film Institute.

== Films ==
Sublett appeared in Hollywood films of the late 1930s and 1940s, including Varsity Show in 1937, Cabin in the Sky in 1943 and A Song Is Born in 1948. In later life, he also made television appearances, one of his last being on a musical episode of The Lucy Show, which also guest-starred Mel Tormé and a featured performance on Barbra Streisand's 1967 TV special, The Belle of 14th Street, a tribute to the bygone era of vaudeville.

== Vietnam War USO touring ==
During the Vietnam War, John Bubbles toured the war zone with the USO. In 1965, he appeared with Eddie Fisher on a USO tour, visiting many outposts and camps in the early war years. He appeared with Judy Garland in her 1967 concerts at the Palace Theatre in New York City, singing "Me And My Shadow." That same year, he became partially paralyzed due to a stroke.

== Later career ==
In 1978, John Bubbles spoke at the Variety Arts Theatre in Los Angeles as a participant in a seminar on vaudeville. Someone asked him who the best tap dancer was. Bubbles answered, "You're looking at him." Then he added, "Honestly, if I had to name the best dancer, it would be Fred Astaire. He could tap. He had a good teacher. But he could ballroom, dance with a partner. All in all, he's the best." That same night, Bubbles mentioned that Astaire had brought him into the rehearsal hall to work on "Bojangles of Harlem" and John's chops are right there in the number.

He performed at the Newport Jazz Festival in New York in 1979, which was one of his last public appearances. Sublett died on May 18, 1986, at his home in Baldwin Hills, California.

== Filmography ==
- Varsity Show (1937)
- Cabin in the Sky (1943)
- Laff Jamboree (1945)
- A Song Is Born (1948)
- The Lucy Show, guest appearance

== Legacy ==
Sublett is known as the father of "rhythm tap," a form of tap dance. Sublett included percussive heel drops in his tap style, as opposed to the tap dancing of Bill Robinson (Bojangles) who emphasized clean phrases and toe taps. Sublett's taps were made to the traditional eight-bar phrase, but allowed for more rhythmic freedom. He blended the improvisational style of jazz music with the traditional techniques of tap to create a unique style and sound. According to Thomas Brothers, Bubbles invented new steps and altered his routines to prevent others from stealing his routine and to please his audience by including their favorite steps.

Sublett received the 1980 Life Achievement Award from the American Guild of Variety Artists. He was inducted into the Tap Hall of Fame in 2002.

Sublett was remembered by many celebrities; his catchphrase, "Shoot the liquor to me, John Boy," has been quoted in songs by several artists, including The Manhattan Transfer, The Ink Spots, and Louis Armstrong. Michael Jackson admired Bubbles' dancing and studied his steps for inspiration. In the mid-1980s, Jackson named his beloved pet chimpanzee "Bubbles" in memory of John Sublett.

== See also ==
- List of dancers
