= Harry Golden =

American journalist (1902–1981)

Harry Lewis Golden (May 6, 1902 – October 2, 1981) was an American writer and newspaper publisher.

Only in America (1958) paperback

== Early life ==
Golden was born Herschel Goldhirsch (or Goldenhurst) in the shtetl Mikulintsy, Austria-Hungary. In 1904 his father, Leib Goldhirsch (a former Hebrew teacher) and his mother Anna Klein Goldhirsch emigrated to Winnipeg, Manitoba, only to move the family to New York City the next year and "became an editor of the Jewish Daily Forward."

For a time, Harry worked as a newspaper seller on the Lower East Side and could remember shouting out headlines about the Leo Frank case about which he later wrote a book. As a teenager, he became interested in Georgism, and later spoke on its behalf.

He became a stockbroker but lost his job in the 1929 stock market crash. Convicted of mail fraud because he had held onto funds entrusted and thereby caused a loss to investors, Golden served four years in a Federal prison at Atlanta, Georgia and, decades later President Richard M. Nixon gave Golden a full presidential pardon for the mail fraud conviction.

== Desegregation ==
In 1941, he moved to Charlotte, where, as a reporter for the Charlotte Labor Journal and The Charlotte Observer, he wrote about and spoke out against racial segregation and the Jim Crow laws of the time.

1959 essay collection

From 1942 to 1968, Golden published The Carolina Israelite as a forum, not just for his political views but also observations and reminiscences of his boyhood in New York's Lower East Side. He traveled widely: in 1960 to speak to Jews in West Germany and again to cover the 1961 trial of Adolf Eichmann in Israel for Life. He is referenced in the lyrics to Phil Ochs' song, "Love Me, I'm a Liberal": "You know, I've memorized Lerner and Golden."

His satirical "The Vertical Negro Plan," involved removing the chairs from any to-be-integrated building, since Southern whites did not mind standing with blacks such as at bank tellers' windows, only sitting with them.

Golden reportedly convinced a southern department store manager to put an "Out of Order" sign by the water fountain marked White; within three weeks all were drinking from the Colored-designated drinking fountain.

Calvin Trillin devised the Harry Golden Rule, which states that "in present-day America it's very difficult, when commenting on events of the day, to invent something so bizarre that it might not actually come to pass while your piece is still on the presses."

Golden's books include three collections of essays from the Israelite and a biography of his friend, poet Carl Sandburg. One of those collections, Only in America, was the basis for a play by Jerome Lawrence and Robert E. Lee. He also maintained a correspondence with Billy Graham.

== Personal ==
His Irish Catholic wife, the former Genevieve Gallagher, predeceased him.

== Critical attention ==
Theodore Solotaroff addressed the "Harry Golden phenomenon" in "Harry Golden & the American Audience" in Commentary magazine, March 1961.

Irving Howe compared Philip Roth's early novel Portnoy's Complaint to For 2¢ Plain in a critical review of Roth's novel in Commentary when Complaint was published in 1969.

== Bibliography ==
- 1944-1968: The Carolina Israelite. (Weekly newspaper published in Charlotte, NC)
- 1950: (With Martin Rywell) Jews in American History: Their Contributions to the United States of America. (Henry, Martin Lewis Co.)
- 1955: Jewish Roots in the Carolinas: A Pattern of American Philo-Semitism.
- 1958: Only in America. (World Publishing Co.) Republished 1972 by World Publishing Co.
- 1958: For 2¢ Plain. (World Publishing Co.) Republished 1976 by Amereon Ltd., ISBN 0-8488-1015-5.
- 1960: Enjoy, Enjoy! (World Publishing Co.)
- 1961: Carl Sandburg. (World Publishing Co.) Republished 1988 by Univ. of Illinois Press, ISBN 0-252-06006-7.
- 1962: (Martin Levin, Ed.) Five Boyhoods.
- 1962: You're Entitle. (World Publishing Co.)
- 1962: The Harry Golden Omnibus. (Cassell & Co.)
- 1962: O. Henry Stories. (Platt & Munk) ISBN 0-448-41105-9.
- 1963: Forgotten Pioneer. (World Publishing Co.)
- 1964: Mr. Kennedy and the Negroes. (World Publishing Co.)
- 1964: So What Else is New? (G.P. Putnam's)
- 1965: A Little Girl is Dead (World Publishing Co., about the Leo Frank case)
- 1965: Amerikah Sheli (My America). Hebrew. Selections from Only in America and For 2¢ Plain. (Jerusalem: Steimatzky)
- 1966: Ess, Ess, Mein Kindt (Eat, Eat, My Child). (G.P. Putnam's)
- 1966: The Lynching of Leo Frank (Cassell & Co., British version of A Little Girl is Dead)
- 1967: The Best of Harry Golden. (World Publishing Co.)*
- 1968: The Humor Gazette - Funniest Stories from Country Papers. (Hallmark Editions)
- 1969: The Right Time: An Autobiography. (G.P. Putnam's)
- 1970: So Long As You're Healthy. (G.P. Putnam's)
- 1971: The Israelis: Portrait of a People. (G.P. Putnam's)
- 1972: The Golden Book of Jewish Humor. (G.P. Putnam's)
- 1972: The Greatest Jewish City in the World. (Doubleday & Co.)
- 1973: (With Richard Goldhurst) Travels Through Jewish America. (Doubleday & Co.)
- 1974: Our Southern Landsmen. (G.P. Putnam's)
- 1975: Long Live Columbus (Leben Zul Columbus). (G.P. Putnam's) ISBN 0-399-11440-8
- 1981: (Unfinished) America, I Love You.

== Awards ==
- Golden is honored with a memorial on the central campus of Central Piedmont Community College in Charlotte.
