= Jane Harvey =

American jazz musician

- Born: Phyllis Taft; January 6, 1925; Jersey City, New Jersey
- Died: August 15, 2013 (aged 88) Los Angeles, CA
- Genres: Jazz
- Occupation: Singer
- Spouse(s): Bob Thiele, William King

Jane Harvey (born Phyllis Taff, January 6, 1925 – August 15, 2013) was an American jazz singer, known for recording several tracks with musicians such as Duke Ellington and Benny Goodman during the 1940s.

Phyllis Taft was born on January 6, 1925, in Jersey City, New Jersey. She auditioned for Barney Josephson, who offered her an opportunity to perform at his Greenwich Village's nightclub, Café Society. Prior to performing, Taft changed her name to Jane Harvey.

In 1946, she joined Desi Arnaz's Orchestra, until she left in 1958 to raise her son, Bob Thiele Jr. She also entertained at military bases overseas with Bob Hope. During the late 1950s, she joined Duke Ellington's Orchestra. Around the time of her death, she performed locally in the Los Angeles area.

She was married to record producer Bob Thiele and had two children, her son Robert and a daughter. She later married William King.

Harvey died of cancer at her home in Los Angeles on August 15, 2013.
