= Tina Robin =

American singer (1937–1996)

- Also known as: Harriet Kay
- Born: Harriet Ostrowsky; November 27, 1937; Newark, New Jersey, U.S.
- Died: March 16, 1996 (aged 58) Cooper City, Florida, U.S.
- Genres: Pop
- Occupations: Singer, entertainer

Tina Robin (born Harriet Ostrowsky; November 27, 1937 – March 16, 1996) was an American pop singer and entertainer.

== Life and career ==
She was born in Newark, New Jersey. She recorded several singles under the name Harriet Kay in 1955. In 1957 she appeared on a popular television quiz show, Hold That Note, and won, gaining recognition for her powerful singing voice and her personality; she was 4 ft 10 in (1.47 m) tall, and nicknamed "The Little Dynamo".

She was managed by Buddy Kaye, and recorded for Coral Records, releasing several singles in the late 1950s but with little success.

However, she released an LP, The 4 Seasons, on Coral in 1958, and was also a regular performer on the Sing Along television show, presented by Jim Lowe. By 1960, she was managed by Don Kirshner and Al Nevins of Aldon Music, and she began releasing singles on the Mercury label. Her only chart success came in 1961, when her recording "Play It Again", written by Gerry Goffin, Carole King and Howard Greenfield, reached #95 on the Billboard Hot 100.

She also worked as a session singer on many of Goffin and King's demo recordings in the early 1960s.

Robin continued to sing and perform comedy and impressions in clubs in New York, as well as in Las Vegas, and appeared on the Ed Sullivan and Johnny Carson shows.

Robin died at her home in Cooper City, Florida, in 1996 at age 58.
