= Earl Wrightson =

American opera singer

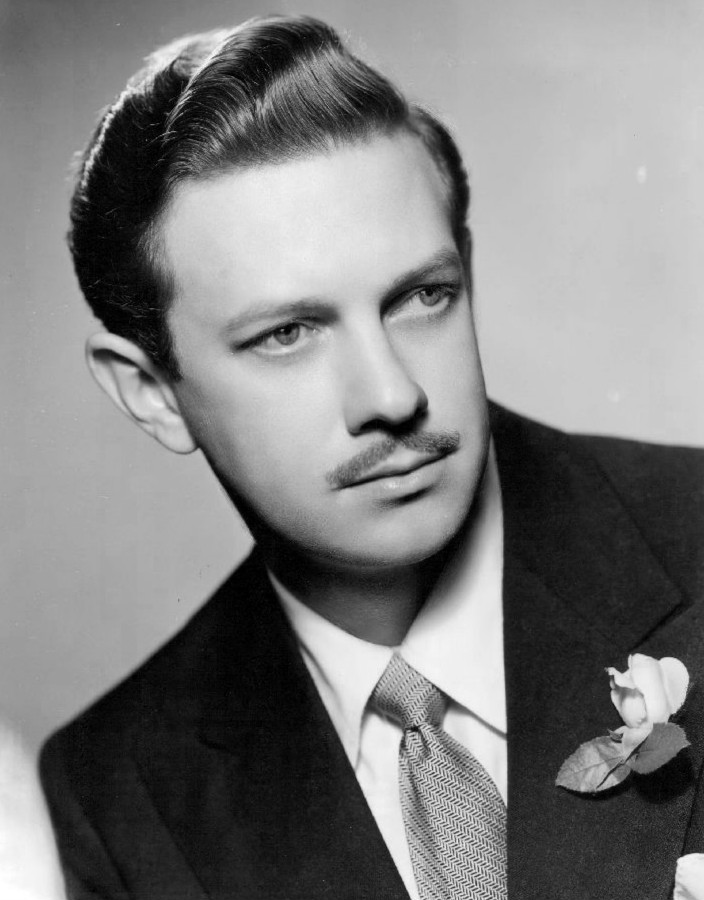
Wrightson in 1945.

Earl Wrightson (January 1, 1916 – March 7, 1993) was an American singer and actor best known for musical theatre, concerts and television performances. His regular singing partner was the soprano Lois Hunt.

== Early life and career ==
Wrightson was born in Baltimore, Maryland, the son of a Methodist minister. He studied voice at a local conservatory and then moved to New York City in the 1930s to study voice with baritone Robert Weede, who sang with the Metropolitan Opera. Wrightson's first job in New York was as a page for NBC. He married Alta Markey, and the pair had a daughter, Wendy. Wrightson separated from his wife, although they never divorced.

Wrightson with Beverly Tyler in The Firebrand of Florence

Wrightson lent his deep baritone voice to the radio, singing regularly on such series as The Prudential Family Hour and The Coca-Cola Hour, often for conductor Andre Kostelanetz. In 1944, he played Robert on Broadway in The New Moon. The following year, he had his only starring role on Broadway in The Firebrand of Florence. Unfortunately, the Kurt Weill and Ira Gershwin musical was a flop, lasting only 43 performances. On tour and in summer theater, he also starred in Camelot, Kiss Me, Kate, Paint Your Wagon, I Do! I Do!, Man of La Mancha, South Pacific, Can-Can, Silk Stockings, Fiddler on the Roof, Gigi, A Little Night Music and The Sound of Music, among other shows.

By the late 1940s, Wrightson performed on television variety shows, including Girl About Town and hosted his own 15-minute variety show, Earl Wrightson at Home on CBS Television. Beginning in 1951, Wrightson's regular singing partner was opera soprano Lois Hunt, with whom he developed an intimate relationship. She had listened to his radio shows as a teenager and became a frequent performer on his television variety show. He won an Emmy Award as the host, for three years in the 1950s, of a CBS Sunday afternoon television show, The American Musical Theater. He also performed on other variety shows, such as Paul Whiteman's Goodyear Revue, and he was heard on shows hosted by Robert Q. Lewis, Jack Paar, Merv Griffin, Mike Douglas and Johnny Carson.

== Later years ==
In the 1960s, Wrightson made several appearances on The Bell Telephone Hour, especially on their annual Christmas programs. Wrightson and Hunt continued to perform Broadway show tunes with symphony orchestras in concerts throughout the U.S., including appearances at Carnegie Hall. While performing at the Shoreham Hotel in Washington, D.C. in the early 1960s, they received an invitation sent on behalf of Lady Bird Johnson to perform at her home for the wives of a group of Japanese government officials who would be attending meetings at the White House. While visiting the Johnsons' residence the evening before their performance, the singers were invited upstairs to meet the vice president. According to Hunt, Lyndon Johnson, suffering from a cold, greeted them "in his green silk pajamas with his initials, LBJ, embroidered from just below his shoulder to just above his ankle".

Wrightson and Hunt recorded five albums together, and he recorded many more alone, including over a dozen studio recordings of musicals and operettas, often with conductor Al Goodman. He received the Handel Medallion from the City of New York in recognition of his artistic achievements. Wrightson's last major singing role was in 1980 as Captain von Trapp in The Sound of Music, together with Hunt, in a 97-city tour.

He died of heart failure at his home in East Norwich, Long Island, New York at the age of 77.

== Selected recordings ==
- The Red Mill – Studio Cast, 1946 (conductor: Al Goodman)
- Eileen – Studio Cast, 1946 (Al Goodman)
- Blossom Time – Studio Cast, 1947 (Al Goodman)
- The Student Prince – Studio Cast, 1947 and 1957 (Al Goodman)
- Naughty Marietta – Studio Cast, 1947 (Al Goodman)
- The Desert Song – Studio Cast, 1948
- The New Moon – Studio Cast, 1949 (Al Goodman)
- The Vagabond King – Studio Cast, 1950 (Al Goodman)
- A Connecticut Yankee – Studio Cast, 1952 (Al Goodman)
- Rio Rita – Studio Cast, 1952 (Al Goodman)
- Satins and Spurs – Television Cast, 1954 (Clay Warnick; Charles Sanford)
- Sweethearts – Studio Cast, 1957 (Al Goodman)
- Sea Shanties: Favourite Songs of the Sea – (Lead soloist with the Roger Wagner Chorale)
- A Night with Jerome Kern – 1959 (Percy Faith)
- A Night with Rudolf Friml – (Frank De Vol)
- A Night with Sigmund Romberg – 1959 (Percy Faith)
- Freedomland U.S.A. – New York Cast Recording, 1960 (Frank De Vol)
- Show Boat – Compilation, 1960s
- Kiss Me, Kate – Studio Cast, 1963 (Glenn Osser)
- Frank Loesser: I Hear Music –
- The Great American Composers: Harold Arlen – Compilation, 1990
- The Great American Composers: Rodgers & Hammerstein, Vol. 2 – Compilation, 1993
