= Lois Hunt =

American opera singer

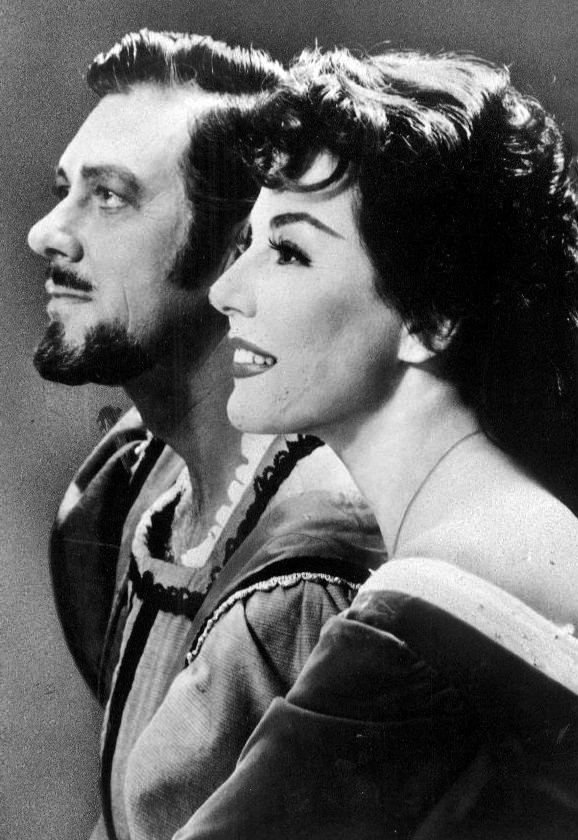
- Earl Wrightson and Hunt in 1963
- Born: Lois Harriet Marcus; November 26, 1924; York, Pennsylvania, U.S.
- Died: July 26, 2009, aged 84; Manhattan, U.S.
- Occupation: Singer
- Spouse: Morton M. Hunt (divorced)
- Children: 1

Lois Hunt (born Lois Harriet Marcus, November 26, 1924 – July 26, 2009) was an American lyric soprano who had spent some of her earlier career performing at New York City's Metropolitan Opera and later spent four decades performing and recording classical music and musical theater numbers nationwide together with baritone Earl Wrightson.

== Early life and training ==
She was born in York, Pennsylvania, as Lois Harriet Marcus. She began singing while in elementary school and began a professional career after working with opera coaches in Philadelphia. She had been singing professionally for three years when a Metropolitan Opera assistant manager who had seen her sing in a performance in Colorado of Ludwig van Beethoven's only opera, Fidelio, convinced her to head to New York City. There she earned a contract with the Met after her participation in the opera company's 1949 Metropolitan Opera Auditions of the Air competition.

== Performing at the Met and on the road ==
While with the Met, Hunt sang such roles as Adele in Die Fledermaus by Johann Strauss II, Papagena in Wolfgang Amadeus Mozart's The Magic Flute, as well as Musetta in La bohème and Lauretta in Gianni Schicchi, both written by Giacomo Puccini. She sang the role of Adele in a 1953 presentation of a 90-minute version of Die Fledermaus on television, the first created by the Met for the new medium.

She appeared on Earl Wrightson At Home in the early 1950s, having been a listener of the host's radio show when she was a teenager. She became a frequent performer on the show and developed an intimate personal relationship with Earl Wrightson that lasted for decades. The two appeared on television in the mid-1950s on The Robert Q. Lewis Show, a variety program. They went on tour around the United States, performing musical numbers and operettas at nightclubs and concert venues. They recorded musical selections on several albums for Columbia Records, including numbers by Jerome Kern and Sigmund Romberg recorded with the Percy Faith orchestra. Their final performances together were in a 97-city tour over six months in 1979 and 1980 of The Sound of Music, in which Hunt proudly stated that they "were the only two members of the cast whose understudies never went on", reflecting their "great pride in our professionalism and integrity".

While performing at the Shoreham Hotel in Washington, D.C. in the early 1960s, they received an invitation sent on behalf of Lady Bird Johnson to perform at her home for the wives of a group of Japanese government officials who would be attending meetings at the White House. While visiting the Johnsons' residence the evening before their performance, Hunt and Wrightson were invited upstairs to meet the vice president. Lyndon Johnson, suffering from a cold, greeted them "in his green silk pajamas with his initials, LBJ, embroidered from just below his shoulder to just above his ankle". She later joked about their having met the future president for the first time while he was in his pajamas.

In 1961, Marty Manning And His Orchestra released the LP record 'The Twilight Zone: An Adventure In Space', (The Twilight Zone (1959 TV series)), on the Columbia Records label, (CL1586, mono, (CS8386, stereo), on which Hunt sang the wordless vocals.

== Personal life ==
A resident of Frenchtown, New Jersey at the time of her death, Hunt had earlier lived in Roosevelt, New Jersey, having moved there in 1997 from Oyster Bay, New York. Hunt enjoyed the culture of Roosevelt, and its "many artists and musicians". She died at age 84 on July 26, 2009, in Manhattan due to complications of cardiac surgery. She was survived by a son. Her marriage to Morton M. Hunt had ended in divorce, while her relationship with Wrightson ended with his death in 1993. Contralto Gabrielle Hunt was the sister of her first husband.
