= Patrice Munsel =

American opera singer (1925–2016)

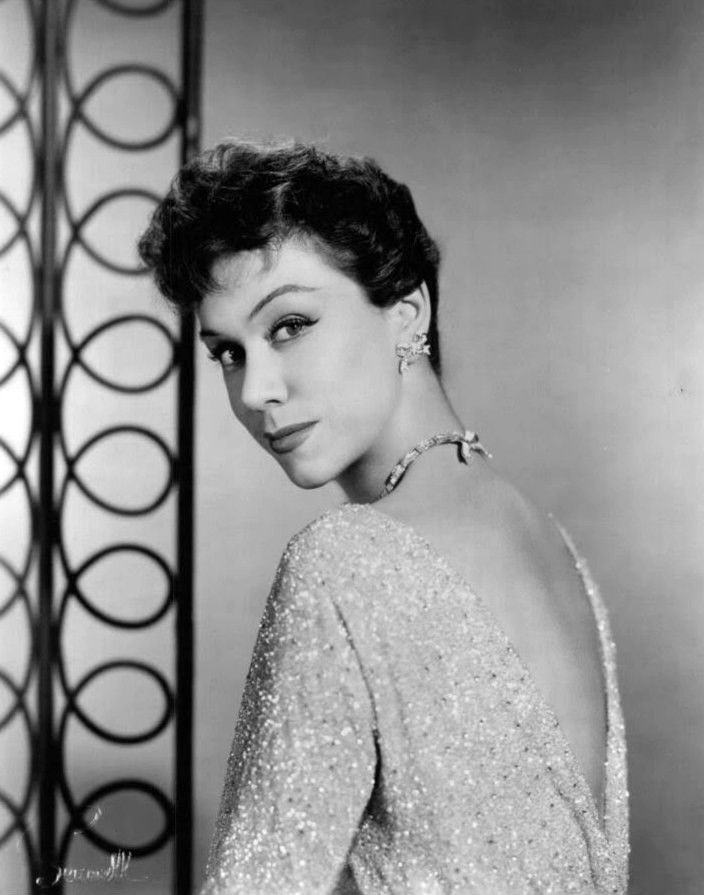
- Munsel in 1962
- Born: Patrice Beverly Munsil; May 14, 1925; Spokane, Washington, U.S.
- Died: August 4, 2016 (aged 91); Schroon Lake, New York, U.S.
- Occupation: Singer
- Known for: Opera, coloratura soprano
- Spouse: Robert Schuler (m. 1952; died 2007)
- Children: 2 sons, 2 daughters
- Parent(s): Audley J. Munsil; Eunice A. Munsil

Patrice Munsel (born Patrice Beverly Munsil; May 14, 1925 – August 4, 2016) was an American coloratura soprano. Nicknamed "Princess Pat", she was the youngest singer ever to star at the Metropolitan Opera.

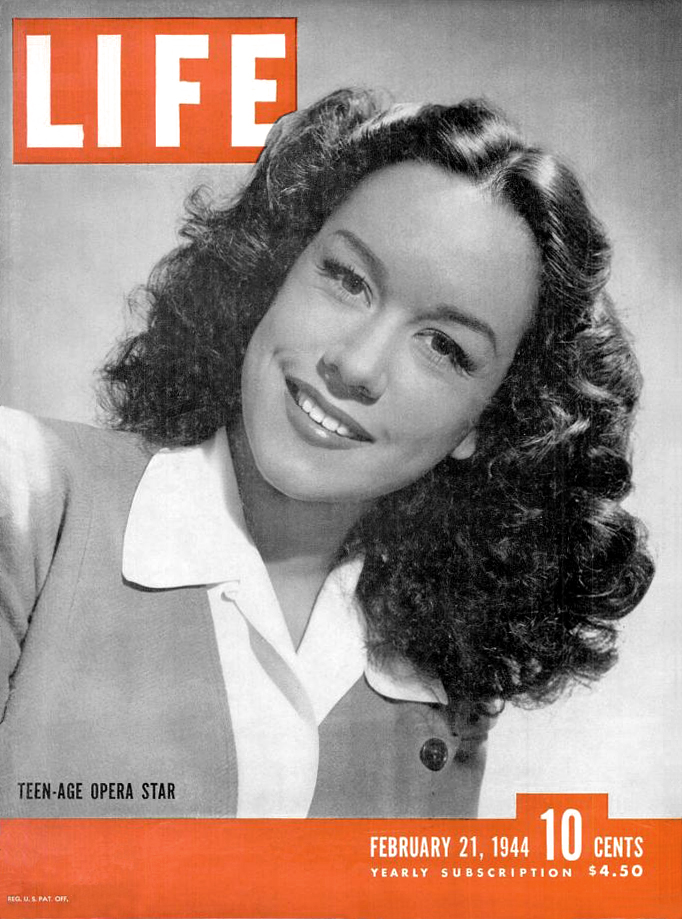
Munsel on the cover of Life magazine, Philippe Halsman's photo (February 21, 1944)

== Early years ==
An only child, Patrice Beverly Munsil (she later changed the spelling of her surname) was born and raised until age 15 in Spokane, Washington. Her father, Audley J. Munsil, was a local dentist. Her parents supported her interest in art, having her take ballet and tap dance lessons. She was a whistler as a girl, inspired by Disney birds (who were usually voiced by whistlers Marion Darlington, Purv Pullen, and Pinto Colvig, who was also a voice actor). Between ages 10 - 12, she was a local celebrity in Spokane for her singing and whistling. She attended Lewis and Clark High School before leaving at age fifteen, accompanied by her mother, to study in New York City, coached by Giacomo Spadoni (1884–1960).

== Career ==
At the age of 17 Munsel performed on Metropolitan Opera Auditions of the Air, an annual singing competition sponsored by the Metropolitan Opera of New York City. Her performance of the "Mad Scene" from Lucia di Lammermoor led to a Met contract. She was the youngest singer ever to debut at the Metropolitan Opera.

She made her official Metropolitan debut on December 4, 1943, aged 18, singing Philine in Mignon, for which she won popular praise but poor critical reviews. Her first opera contract was for three years at $40,000 per year; with other appearances she was making around $100,000 annually.

Perhaps best known for the roles of Adele in Die Fledermaus and Despina in Così fan tutte, Munsel sang 225 times at the Metropolitan Opera. Sir Rudolf Bing called her a "superb soubrette" and implied that she was the world's best. Her opera roles also included Rosina in The Barber of Seville and Gilda in Rigoletto.

Her husband Robert C. Schuler conceived and produced the ABC-TV primetime variety series The Patrice Munsel Show, which starred his wife, and was broadcast in the 1957–1958 season. Munsel appeared on many other TV shows during her career, including the role of Marietta (Countess d'Altena) in the January 15, 1955 live telecast of the operetta Naughty Marietta. She was opera singer Rosa Monetebello in a 1969 episode of The Wild, Wild West television series. as well as Lola Tuscany in the television series Checkmate. She portrayed the title role in the 1953 film Melba, which chronicled the life of the great opera singer Dame Nellie Melba.

Munsel made frequent television appearances on The Bell Telephone Hour. She was the celebrity guest on the February 2, 1958 episode of the TV quiz show What's My Line?. Munsel was the central singer in the Camp Fire Girls' famous TV commercial and song "Sing Around the Campfire (Join the Camp Fire Girls)", aired in the mid-1960s. A former Camp Fire Girl herself, she was also a spokeswoman for the organization.

Munsel made her final performance for the Metropolitan Opera on January 28, 1958, in the title role in La Périchole.

Munsel starred in a California production of Cole Porter's "Kiss Me, Kate" in 1964 staged by the Civic Light Opera Companies of Los Angeles and San Francisco.

She appeared on stage as a guest during the 1966 Gala Farewell to the old opera house at Broadway and 39th Street, despite never performing at the new Met location on Lincoln center. Munsel ended her career as an opera singer in 1981, and began to perform in musical comedies. She retired from performing in 2008.

== Personal life and death ==
In 1952, Munsel married Robert C. Schuler, an advertising and public relations executive, producer, and writer. They were married for 55 years, until his death at age 90 in 2007, and had four children: Heidi (born 1953), Rhett (1955–2005), Scott (born 1958), and Nicole (born 1959). The younger two children were born prematurely. Munsel and Schuler co-wrote a 2005 memoir of Schuler's life entitled The Diva & I: My Life with Metropolitan Opera Star Patrice Munsel.

For a number of years, Munsel lived in Flower Hill, New York. Munsel died on August 4, 2016, at her home in Schroon Lake, New York, aged 91.

== Selected discography ==
- Selections from The King and I, following the official cast album with Gertrude Lawrence, Munsel was the second Anna on record, in a studio recording accompanied by Robert Merrill as the king, and supported by Dinah Shore and Tony Martin as the young lovers. Most of the album was accompanied by Henri René & His Orchestra 1952

== Video ==
- Texaco Star Theater television appearance (September 25, 1951), youtube.com
- Looking back: Patrice Munsel, spokesman.com, January 5, 2008
- Video of January 31, 1958 episode at Internet Archive
- Hour of Power episode 553 May, 16, 1982 YouTube.com
