= Matt Mattox =

American dancer (1921–2013)

Harold Henry Mattox, better known by his stage name Matt Mattox, (August 16, 1921 – February 18, 2013) was an American dancer, choreographer, and dance educator. Born in Tulsa, Oklahoma, he moved with his family to California in the early 1930s where he trained in ballet, tap, and modern dance. He made his stage debut at the age of 11 in Los Angeles, and after graduating from San Bernardino High School in 1936 attended San Bernardino Valley College. His dance career was interrupted during World War II when he spent two years in United States Army Air Forces from 1942-1944.

After his war service ended, Mattox became a performer in Broadway musicals; making his New York debut in Are You with It? in 1945. He worked on Broadway as a performer through 1960; creating parts in such musicals as Park Avenue (1946), Magdalena: a Musical Adventure (1948), Carnival in Flanders (1953), The Vamp (1955), Say, Darling (1958), and Once Upon a Mattress (1959). He also choreographed three Broadway musicals: Say, Darling, Jennie (1963), and What Makes Sammy Run? (1965). He concurrently had a prolific career as a dancer in Hollywood musical films from 1942 through 1960. His best-known film role was as Caleb Pontipee in the 1954 film Seven Brides for Seven Brothers. Some of the other films in which he was a featured dancer included Yolanda and the Thief, The Band Wagon, Gentlemen Prefer Blondes, There's No Business Like Show Business, and Guys and Dolls to name just a few.

After 1960, Mattox re-oriented his career toward working as a dance educator and choreographer. In the 1960s he worked in the United States as a choreographer with the Brooklyn Ballet and New Jersey Ballet, and taught dance at the Neighborhood Playhouse School of the Theatre. In 1970 he relocated to London where he founded the dance company Jassart and taught on the faculty at The Dance Centre. In 1975 he relocated Jazzart to Paris, and thereafter resided in that country. With his second wife, the Catalan jazz dancer Martine Limeul, he co-founded the École de Dance in Perpignan.

== Early life and education ==
The son of Jack M. Mattox and Elsie M. Mattox (nee Wilbanks), Harold Henry Mattox was born on August 18, 1921, in Tulsa, Oklahoma. In the early 1930s he moved with his family to San Bernardino, California where he attended San Bernardino High School (SBHS). He was a pole vaulter on SBHS's track and field team.

In California he began studying ballet and tap dancing at the age of 11, and made his professional stage debut at that age at the Fox Figueroa Theatre in Los Angeles. He attended San Bernardino Valley College. He originally aspired to a career as a ballet dancer, and studied ballet with Ernest Belcher and Nico Charisso. He diversified his dance studies in tap with Louis Da Pron, Evelyn Bruns and Teddy Kerr; and in modern and jazz dance with Jack Cole. He also studied singing with New York voice teacher Keith Davis (known for working with Broadway performers), and acting with Wynn Handman.

== Career ==
In his early career Mattox performed under his real name, Harold Mattox, and only later adopted the stage name Matt Mattox in 1948. His first significant work on the stage was in 1937 when he performed in a variety program at the Hippodrome Theatre in Los Angeles as part of a tap dancing duo with Norman Snyder. In 1940 he starred in a production of the ballet The Sleeping Beauty at the Ocean Park Municipal Auditorium. He performed as Haroldi in Joan Norbury's ballet The Golden Circlet with the Ernest Belcher Concert Dancers at the Redlands Bowl in August 1940. In 1941 he performed at the Embassy Theatre in Los Angeles with the Nico Charisse Dancers in a concert sponsored by the Works Progress Administration. With Charisse's company he danced the role of the prince in Swan Lake in December 1941.

Mattox's dance career was interrupted by two years of service in the United States Army Air Forces during World War II from 1942-1944. He worked as a fighter pilot, and earned the rank of second lieutenant. After his war service ended, he returned to California where he signed a contract with MGM in 1944 as dancer for their musical films. He was offered a contract after successfully auditioning for Robert Alton. At MGM he was mentored in dance by choreographers Jack Cole and Eugene Loring. Cole was a legendary jazz dance pioneer who had a significant impact on the evolution of Mattox's own work as jazz dancer and educator. From Cole and Loring Mattox learned a fusion style of dance known as “freestyle dance" combined elements of tap dance, Spanish dance, Russian folk dance, European radical modernism and ballet. His early film credits at MGM included working as a dancer in Meet Me in St. Louis (1944), Yolanda and the Thief (1945), Till the Clouds Roll By (1946), Two Sisters from Boston (1946), Something in the Wind (1947), and Good News (1947).

Mattox appeared in the show Parade of Talent at the Wilshire Ebell Theatre in the summer of 1945. He made his Broadway debut in the company of the 1945 musical Are You with It? which ran at the Shubert Theatre. He portrayed the role of Ted Woods in the 1946 Broadway musical Park Avenue at the Shubert Theatre. In 1947 he starred in the Los Angeles Civic Light Opera's (LACLO) production of Louisiana Purchase, and was a soloist in the 1947-1948 national tour of Song of Norway which was produced by Edwin Lester. In this tour he was partnered with ballerina Alexandra Denisova.

In 1948 Mattox adopted the stage name Matt Mattox, beginning with the role of Bailador in the Broadway production of Magdalena: a Musical Adventure which was choreographed by Cole. In 1949 he portrayed the part of Dream Curly in Australia's first production of Oklahoma!; a production which he also choreographed and which ran for more than 500 performances across its four city tour. In 1950 he reprised his principal dancing role in Song of Norway for its Australian premiere at Her Majesty's Theatre, Melbourne. It also toured Australia for an eight month period. In 1952 he directed the dancers for the LACLO's revival of Song of Norway; also serving as co-choreographer with Aida Broadbent.

Mattox continued to work in Hollywood as a specialty dancer in musical films during the 1950s. His best-known film role was Caleb Pontipee in Seven Brides for Seven Brothers (1954). He was also a principal dancer in, among others, The Band Wagon (Cyd Charisse's partner in the ballet sequence), Dreamboat (1952), Gentlemen Prefer Blondes (1953), The Girl Rush (1955), There's No Business Like Show Business, and Pepe (1960). In addition, Mattox was a regular guest on television variety shows, for which he choreographed as well as performed, including The Patti Page Oldsmobile Show, 1958-59. He concurrently maintained a career on Broadway. His New York credits included creating and performing the role of the Jester in the original production of Once Upon a Mattress (1959), and Harry Beaton in the 1957 revival of Brigadoon. Mattox also performed concert engagements with his own dance company. His brief career as a Broadway choreographer included Jennie and Say, Darling.

Mattox used his background in ballet technique to create his own technique for jazz dance. His jazz class was assembled in the progression of a ballet class, and he called his exercises "the barre". Mattox also specifically designed the exercises to relate to the combinations given at the end of his class. The positions, shapes, and qualities developed during the barre are visible within his own detailed and polished style.

One of the world's most influential teachers of jazz dance—or, as he called it, "freestyle dancing"— Mattox lived and worked in Perpignan, France. He formed a concert jazz dance company in 1975 in England and eventually brought it to France.

In 1994 Mattox was knighted as a Chevalier of the Ordre des Arts et des Lettres.
