= The Great Waltz (musical) =

1934 Broadway musical

- Original Broadway program
- Music: Johann Strauss I Johann Strauss II
- Lyrics: Desmond Carter; Oscar Hammerstein II; Robert Wright; George Forrest
- Book: Moss Hart; A. M. Willner; Caswell Garth; Ernst Marischka; Heinz Reichert
- Basis: Strauss family feud
- Productions: 1934 Broadway; 1938 Film version 1970 West End; 1972 Film remake

The Great Waltz is a musical conceived by Hassard Short with a book by Moss Hart and lyrics by Desmond Carter, using themes by Johann Strauss I and Johann Strauss II. It is based on a pasticcio by Erich Wolfgang Korngold and Julius Bittner called Walzer aus Wien, first performed in Vienna in 1930. The story of the musical is loosely based on the real-life feud between the older and younger Strauss, allegedly because of the father's jealousy of his son's greater talent.

The Great Waltz debuted on Broadway at the Center Theatre on September 22, 1934 and ran for 289 performances. The production was directed by Hassard Short and presented by Max Gordon, with choreography by Albertina Rasch, settings by Albert Johnson and costumes by Doris Zinkeisen together with Marion Claire, Marie Burke and Guy Robertson. The musical was made into a motion picture by MGM in 1938 with a screenplay and new lyrics by Oscar Hammerstein II.

In 1949 impresario Edwin Lester hired Robert Wright and George Forrest to adapt Strauss's German lyrics and music for a production at the Los Angeles Civic Light Opera starring Dorothy Kirsten and John Charles Thomas. This version was used for a London revival that opened at the Drury Lane Theatre on July 9, 1970 and ran for 605 performances. It was also used for a 1972 film remake.

== Songs ==
Act I

- Radetsky March – The Brass Band
- Morning – Therese ((Resi), Ebeseders' daughter)
- Look Before You Leap – Therese and Leopold ((Poldi), Greta's nephew)
- You Are My Songs – Resi, Johann Strauss, Jr. ((Schani)) and Ensemble
- Love Will Find You – Resi and Schani
- On Love Alone – Ensemble and Ballet
- Like a Star in the Sky – Countess Olga Baranskaja and Schani
- With All My Heart – Resi

Act II

- Night – Ensemble
- Love's Never Lost – Olga, Poldi and Captain Hal Fredrich
- We Love You Still – Olga
- While You Love Me – Resi and Schani
- Love and War – Poldi and Ensemble
- The Blue Danube (Danube So Blue) – Resi and Company

The 1970 London revival added "No Two Ways" (lyrics: George Forrest, music: Robert Wright)
