= Helena Bliss =

American actress

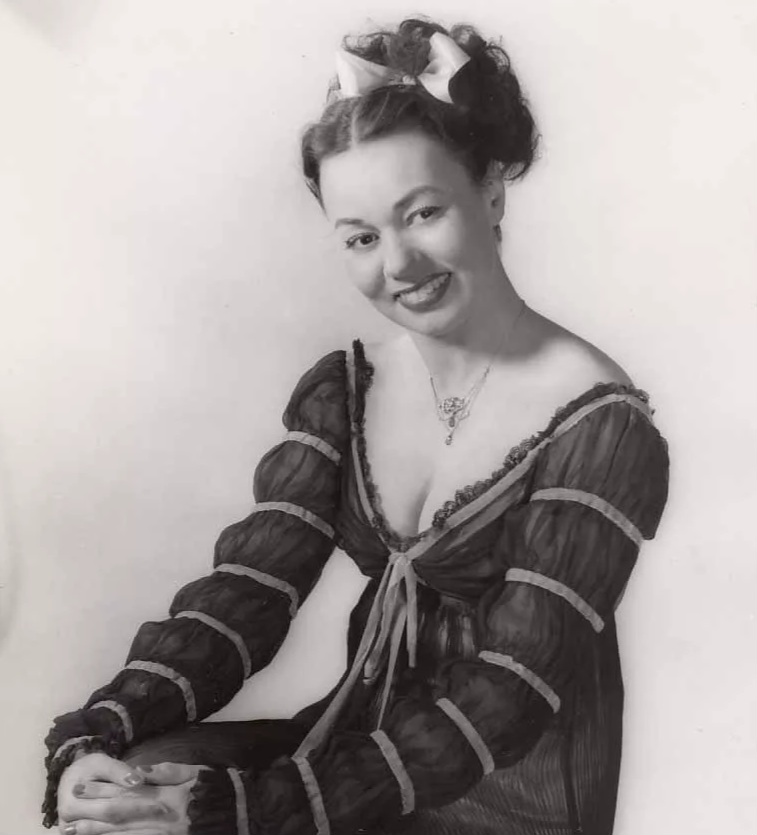
- Bliss in 1949
- Born: December 31, 1917; St. Louis, Missouri, U.S.
- Died: April 19, 2014 (aged 96)
- Occupation: Actress
- Years active: 1930s–1959
- Spouse: John Tyers (m. 1947; died 2007)
- Children: 2

Helena Bliss (December 31, 1917 – April 19, 2014) was an American actress and singer. A talented soprano, she actively performed in musicals, operettas, and operas in the United States, both on stage and on television and radio, from the 1930s through the 1950s. She is best known for her portrayal of Nina Hagerup in the original Broadway production of Robert Wright and George Forrest's Song of Norway. She also appeared successfully in a few productions on London's West End.

== Life and career ==
Helena Bliss was born as Helena Louise Lipp in St. Louis, Missouri on December 31, 1917. Her parents were Albert Lipp and Augusta Clemens. She was educated at Washington University in St. Louis. In 1947 she married actor and singer John Tyers who starred opposite her is several productions and performed with several notable opera companies; including the Metropolitan Opera. He died in 2007 after 60 years of marriage. The couple had two sons together: John and Michael Tyers.

Bliss began her career in the late 1930s singing opera on radio and television. She made her stage debut in November 1939 in the role of Helen in a production of Very Warm for May at the Alvin Theatre. During the early 1940s she appeared in several musical and opera entertainments presented to American troops by the United Service Organizations. In July 1943 she performed the title role in Rudolf Friml's Rose-Marie with the St. Louis Municipal Opera. In 1943-1944 she performed in the final season of Sylvan Levin's Philadelphia Opera Company, where she sang Marguerite in Charles Gounod's Faust, Micaela in Georges Bizet's Carmen, Mimi in Giacomo Puccini's La bohème, and Rosalinde in Johann Strauss II's Die Fledermaus.

After Levin's opera company folded, Bliss went to California to join the roster of artists at the Los Angeles Civic Light Opera (LACLO). She made her debut with the company in May 1944 as Marianne Beaunoir in Sigmund Romberg's The New Moon opposite Walter Cassel. This was followed in June 1944 by the role of Nina Hagerup in the world premiere of Robert Wright and George Forrest's Song of Norway which adapted its music from works by Edvard Grieg. A triumph with both audience and critics, this production became Bliss' first major success. In late June the show was presented to enthusiastic response by the LACLO's sister organization, the San Francisco Light Opera Company (SFLOC); after which it was transported by the LACLO to New York City. In August 1944 Bliss made her Broadway debut as Nina Hagerup at the Imperial Theatre to enthusiastic reviews. The show ran for more than 800 performances, and its cast recording was listed as one of Billboard's most popular releases of March 1945. She later portrayed the role of Countess Louisa Giovanni in the 1952 revival of Song of Norway at the LACLO with Jean Fenn in the part of Nina.

After leaving the New York production of Song of Norway in April 1946, Bliss returned to the California to star in another new production by Wright and Forrest, Gypsy Lady, which utilized music by Victor Herbert. Commissioned by the LACLO, the show was presented successfully both in Los Angeles and at the SFLOC in San Francisco. The production also starred her future husband John Tyers whom she would later marry in June 1947. This show was also exported to Broadway by the LACLO where it opened in September 1946, but it was poorly received by critics, and its run lasted a mere 10 weeks. Bliss, and most of the rest of the Broadway cast, remained with the show when it moved from New York to London's West End the following year. The show was revised somewhat and retitled Romany Love. While the production as a whole received mixed reviews, Bliss's performance was hailed by the London press as a major triumph.

In 1949 Bliss made her debut at the New York City Opera (NYCO) as Claire, the Mulatto Empress, in the world premiere of William Grant Still's Troubled Island. She later returned to the NYCO as Nedda in Ruggero Leoncavallo's Pagliacci. In 1951 she toured the United States as Sarah Millick in a production of Noël Coward's Bitter Sweet. She returned to London's West End in 1951-1952 to assume the title role in Cole Porter's Kiss Me, Kate. She returned to Broadway for the last time as Julie in the 1954 revival of Show Boat; a production which was mounted by the NYCO. She later toured the United States in that role in 1956-1957. In 1959 she starred in Rodgers and Hart's Pal Joey at the Paper Mill Playhouse in New Jersey. Other venues and organizations with whom Bliss performed include Forest Park in St. Louis, Grant Park in Chicago, the Hartford Symphony Orchestra, the Jones Beach Theater in New York, and the Pittsburgh Opera. Her only major film work was as Valencienne in the 1955 television production of Franz Lehár's The Merry Widow.
