= Los Angeles Civic Light Opera =

American theatre/opera company

- Formation: 1936
- Dissolved: 1987
- Type: Theatre group
- Purpose: theatre/opera
- Location: Los Angeles, California

The Los Angeles Civic Light Opera (LACLO) was an American theatre/opera company in Los Angeles, California. Founded under the motto "Light Opera in the Grand Opera manner" in 1936 by impresario Edwin Lester, the organization presented fifty seasons of theatre before closing due to financial reasons in 1987. Typically the LACLO presented four to six productions during an annual season. The company produced or co-produced several of their own shows in addition to bringing in shows from Broadway to California, often with their original casts. Productions that originated at the LACLO and then went on to wider success, included Song of Norway (1944), Magdalena (1948), Kismet (1953), Peter Pan (1954) and Gigi (1973). Initially the organization mainly presented American operettas, but by the 1960s the company was presenting mostly musical theatre; although the company never completely left its roots.

== History ==
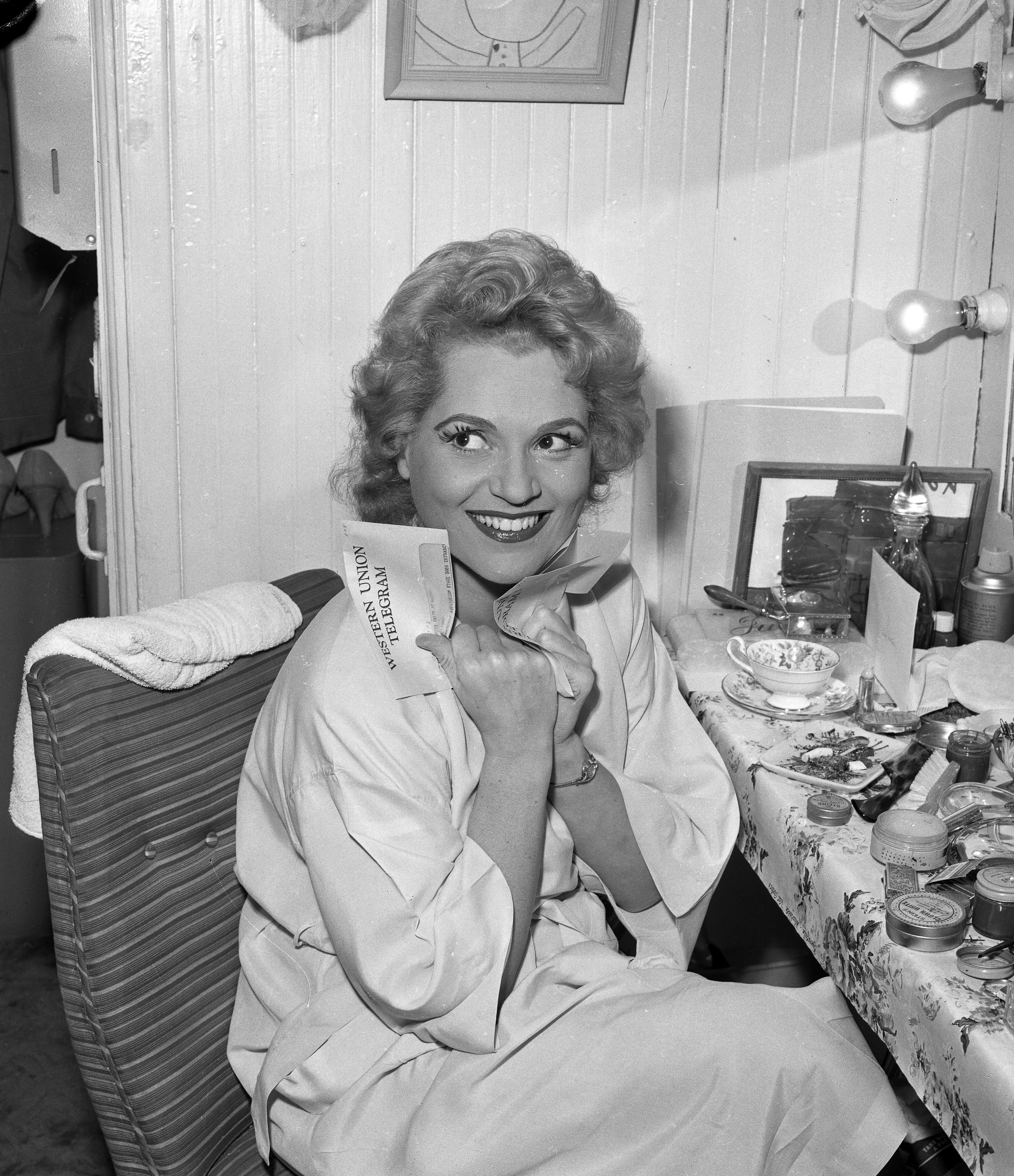
Judy Holliday in her dressing room before the Los Angeles premiere of the Broadway hit Bells Are Ringing with the Los Angeles Civic Light Opera (1959)

The formation of the Los Angeles Civic Light Opera (LACLO) was announced to the public in March 1936 with John Henry Russell, the manager of the Pacific Mutual Life insurance company, elected the first president of LACLO's board and Edwin Lester appointed General Director of the company. The formation of the organization followed an earlier season of light operas presented by Lester in the Spring of 1935. These were led by music director Arthur Kay, and began with a staging of Friml's The Vagabond King which opened at Philharmonic Auditorium on May 20, 1935. This season was later described as a "pilot season" for LACLO, and also included performances of The Chocolate Soldier with Charles Purcell reprising his leading role from the 1931 Broadway production.

LACLO opened its first season in 1938 with the operetta Blossom Time, based on works by Franz Schubert, presented in English with stars John Charles Thomas and Francia White. The production was both a critical and financial success, and the company went on to have three more sold out productions that season with Sigmund Romberg's The Student Prince, Romberg's The New Moon, and Jerome Kern's Roberta.

At the time the LACLO opened, Broadway touring productions out of New York City did not travel further west than the Rocky Mountains. However, the success of the LACLO's first season drew the attention of the theatre community in New York City; seeing for the first time the financial potential of theatre in Los Angeles. Lester further encouraged this interest by partnering with San Francisco theatre impresario Homer Curran who founded the San Francisco Light Opera Company (SFLOC) in 1939. The LACLO and SFLOC joined forces and were able to offer New York producers the ability to book their shows in both L.A. and San Francisco. The Broadway producers took advantage of this opportunity and began extending their touring productions into California.

While including touring productions from NYC in their annual season, the LACLO still continued to mount their own locally produced productions under the artistic leadership of Lester. One major triumph for the company was the 1944 operetta Song of Norway which Lester commissioned Milton Lazarus, Robert Wright, and George Forrest to create using the music of Edvard Grieg. The production later went on to have a successful Broadway run. Wright and Forrest created several more original works for the LACLO, most notably the 1953 musical Kismet, which had an even greater success in New York. Perhaps the most successful original work to be produced at the LACLO was the 1954 musical version of Peter Pan which Lester orchestrated as a star vehicle for Mary Martin. After opening in Los Angeles, the production moved to Broadway, winning Martin a Tony Award. The LACLO also exported a number of revivals to Broadway during its history, including a 1945 revival of Victor Herbert's The Red Mill which ran for more than a year in New York.

During the 1950s and 1960s the LACLO was the most financially successful musical theatre subscription organization of its kind. However, in the 1970s the organization's audience size began to decrease and by the 1980s the company was experiencing serious financial difficulties. The company's last production was of John Kander's Cabaret in 1987. The production starred Joel Grey, Alyson Reed, Regina Resnik, Werner Klemperer, Gregg Edelman, and David Staller. Composer, conductor, and pianist Harper MacKay was the LACLO's music director from 1962 through 1980.

== Performance history ==
Year	Productions	Cast list
1938	Blossom Time (Franz Schubert)	John Charles Thomas, Francia White, Melville Cooper
	The Student Prince (Sigmund Romberg)	Dennis Morgan, Della Lind
	The New Moon (Sigmund Romberg, Oscar Hammerstein II)	George Houston, Francia White, Sterling Holloway,
	Roberta (Jerome Kern)	Bob Hope, Tamara Drasin, Ray Middleton, Donald Novis, Carole Landis
1939	The Cat and the Fiddle (Jerome Kern, Oscar Hammerstein II)	Helen Gahagan, George F. Houston, Odette Myrtil
	The Desert Song (Sigmund Romberg, Oscar Hammerstein II)	Allan Jones, Margarete Carlisle, Sterling Holloway
	Waltz Dream (Oscar Straus)	John Garrick, Francia White
	The Gypsy Baron (Johann Strauss II)	John Charles Thomas, Vivian Della Chiesa, Irene Manning, Billy Gilbert
1940	Show Boat (Jerome Kern, Oscar Hammerstein II)	John Boles, Norma Terris, Paul Robeson, Guy Kibbee, Helen Morgan
	H.M.S. Pinafore (Gilbert and Sullivan)/ Savoy Serenade	John Charles Thomas, Alice Gentle, Irene Manning, Melville Cooper, Jerome Hines, John Raitt
	The Merry Widow (Franz Lehár)	Jarmila Novotná, Walter Woolf King
	The Red Mill (Victor Herbert)	Sterling Holloway, Dorothy Stone, Charles Collins, Gwen Verdon
1941	Rio Rita (Harry Tierney)	Joe E. Brown, Peter Lind Hayes, Walter Cassel, Mary Healy, Maria Tallchief, Roy Fitzell
	Naughty Marietta (Victor Herbert)	Francia White, Wilbur Evans, Sterlig Holloway
	The Chocolate Soldier (Oscar Straus)	John Charles Thomas, Irene Manning, Irra Petina, Billy Gilbert
	Cabin in the Sky (Vernon Duke, John Latouche)	Ethel Waters, Todd Duncan, Katherine Dunham, Dooley Wilson
1942	The Vagabond King (Rudolf Friml)	Bob Lawrence, Dorothy Sandlin, John Carradine, Marthe Errolle, Felix Knight
	Bitter Sweet (Noël Coward)	Muriel Angelus, John Howard, Corrina Mura
	Music in the Air (Jerome Kern, Oscar Hammerstein II)	John Charles Thomas, Irra Petina, Francis Lederer, Jan Clayton, Al Shean
	Hit the Deck (Vincent Youmans)	Eddie Foy Jr., Joan Roberts, Frank Albertson, Jack Durant
1943	Porgy and Bess (George Gershwin)	Todd Duncan, Etta Moten, Ruby Elzy, Avon Long
	The Gypsy Baron (Johann Strauss II)	Irra Petina, John Tyers, Billy Gilbert, Sig Arno
	The Firefly (Rudolf Friml)	Francia White, John Tyers, Melville Cooper, Odette Myrtil, Al Shean
	Lady in the Dark (Kurt Weill, Ira Gershwin, Moss Hart)	Gertrude Lawrence, Eric Brotherson, Gugh Marlowe, Willard Parker, Richard Hale
1944	Show Boat (Jerome Kern, Oscar Hammerstein II)	Gene Lockhart, Marthe Errolle, Lansing Hatfield, Carol Bruce, Todd Duncan
	The New Moon (Sigmund Romberg, Oscar Hammerstein II)	Helena Bliss, Walter Cassel, Sterling Holloway, Kenny Bowers, Mary Ganly, Eric Mattson, Thelma White, John Shafer, and Wilton Graff
	Song of Norway (Robert Wright)	Irra Petina, Walter Cassel, Helena Bliss, Robert Shafer, Sig Arno, Walter Kingsford, Kent Edwards, Ballet Russe de Monte Carlo
	Sally (Jerome Kern)	Billy Gilbert, Jane Deering
1945	The Desert Song (Sigmund Romberg, Oscar Hammerstein II)	Walter Cassel, Dorothy Sarnoff, Sterling Holloway, George London
	The Red Mill (Victor Herbert)	Eddie Foy Jr., Dorothy Stone, Charles Collins, Odette Myrtil, Lee Dixon
	Carmen Jones (Georges Bizet)	Muriel Smith, Inez Matthews, Lavern Hutcherson, Napoleon Reed
	Rose-Marie (Rudolf Friml)	Irene Manning, Walter Cassel, Eddie Foy Jr., Frances McCann
1946	The Vagabond King (Rudolf Friml)	John Tyers, Dorothy Sarnoff, Marguerite Piazza, Eduardo Ciannelli
	Roberta (Jerome Kern, Otto Harbach)	Luba Malina, George Britton, Nana Bryant, Gilbert Russell, Tom Ewell, Mitzi Gaynor
	Bloomer Girl (E.Y. Harburg, Harold Arlen)	Nanette Fabray, Dick Smart, Dooley Wilson
	Gypsy Lady (Robert Wright, George Forrest)	Helena Bliss, John Tyers, Walter Catlett, Gene Lockhart, Mitzi Gaynor
1947	Song of Norway (Robert Wright, George Forrest)	Irra Petina, Lawrence Brooks, Robert Shafer, Nana Bryant, Sig Arno, Walter Kingsford, Mitzi Gaynor
	Rosalinda (Johann Strauss II)	Wilbur Evans, Irene Manning, Hugh Herbert, Rosemarie Brancato, Oscar Karlweis
	The Three Musketeers (Rudolf Friml)	John Tyers, Polyna Stoska, Frances McCann, Marthe Erolle, Carol Haney
	Louisiana Purchase (Irving Berlin)	William Gaxton, Vera Zorina, Victor Moore, Irène Bordoni, Harold Mattox, Mitzi Gaynor
1948	Annie Get Your Gun (Irving Berlin)	Mary Martin
	Naughty Marietta (Victor Herbert)	Susanna Foster, Wilbru Evans, Edward Everett Horton, Mitzi Gaynor
	Sweethearts (Victor Herbert)	Bobby Clark
	Magdalena (Heitor Villa-Lobos)	Irra Petina, John Raitt, Dorothy Sarnoff, Hugo Haas, Jack Cole Dancers
1949	The Great Waltz (Johann Strauss I and Johann Strauss II)	Walter Slezak, Dorothy Sarnoff, Melva Niles, Charles Fredericks, Mitzi Gaynor, Sig Arno, Eric Brotherson
	Brigadoon (Alan Jay Lerner, Frederick Loewe)	David Brooks, Priscilla Gillette, Pamela Britton, Robert Smith
	Kiss Me, Kate (Cole Porter)	Anne Jeffreys, Keith Andes, Marc Platt, Julie Wilson
	High Button Shoes (Jule Styne, Sammy Cahn)	Eddie Foy Jr., Jack Whiting, Audrey Meadows
	Finian's Rainbow (E.Y. Harburg, Burton Lane)	Joe Yule, Charles Davis
1950	The Chocolate Soldier (Oscar Straus)	Wilbur Evans, Marion Bell, Salvatore Baccaloni, Ralph Dumke
	South Pacific (Rodgers and Hammerstein)	Janet Blair, Richard Eastham, Ray Walston
	Rose-Marie (Rudolf Friml)	Patrice Munsel, Walter Cassel, Muriel O'Malley, Jack Goode, Ollie Franks, George Britton, Jean Fenn
	Lost in the Stars (Kurt Weill, Maxwell Anderson)	Todd Duncan
	Sadler's Wells Ballet (now The Royal Ballet)	Margot Fonteyn, Moira Shearer, Robert Helpmann
1951	Where's Charley? (Frank Loesser)	Ray Bolger
	The Merry Widow (Franz Lehár)	Paul Henreid, Carl Brisson, Jane Pickens, Robert Rounseville, Jean Fenn
	Three Wishes for Jamie (Ralph Blane)	Ralph Dumke, Sig Arno
	Guys and Dolls (Frank Loesser)	John Raitt, Marion Bell, Cecil Kellaway, Allan Jones, Jan Clayton, Pamela Britton, Julie Oshins
1952	The Judy Garland Show	Judy Garland
	Song of Norway (Robert Wright, George Forrest)	Helena Bliss, John Tyers, Jean Fenn, Sig Arno, Robert Rounseville, Walter Kingsford
	Call Me Madam (Irving Berlin)	Elaine Stritch, Kent Smith
	South Pacific (Rodgers and Hammerstein)	Janet Blair, Webb Tilton, Irene Bordoni
	Jollyanna (a revamp of E.Y. Harburg and Sammy Fain's Flahooley)	Bobby Clark, Mitzi Gaynor, John Beal, Bil Baird's Marionettes
	Don Juan in Hell (George Bernard Shaw)	Charles Boyer, Charles Laughton, Cedric Hardwicke, Agnes Moorehead
	The Danny Kaye Show	Danny Kaye
1953	Carousel (Rodgers and Hammerstein)	William Johnson, Jan Clayton, Betta St. John, Murvyn Vye
	The Great Waltz (Johann Strauss I and Johann Strauss II)	Dorothy Kirsten, John Charles Thomas, Bill Shirley, Sig Arno, Florence Henderson, Eric Brotherson, Fred Essler, Ralph Morgan, Virginia Gibson, John Banner
	Carnival in Flanders (Johnny Burke, Jimmy Van Heusen)	Dolores Gray, John Raitt, Matt Mattox
	Kismet (Robert Wright, George Forrest, Luther Davis)	Alfred Drake, Doretta Morrow, Joan Diener, Henry Calvin
	John Brown's Body (Stephen Vincent Benét)	Tyrone Power, Anne Baxter, Raymond Massey
1954	Brigadoon (Alan Jay Lerner, Frederick Loewe)	William Johnson, Dorothy MacNeil, Pamela Britton, Robert Smith, Matt Mattox
	The King and I (Rodgers and Hammerstein)	Yul Brynner, Patricia Morison, Terry Saunders
	Porgy and Bess (George Gershwin)	Cab Calloway
	Peter Pan (Mark Charlap, Carolyn Leigh, Comden & Green, Jule Styne)	Mary Martin, Cyril Ritchard
	A Midsummer Night's Dream (William Shakespeare)	Moira Shearer, Robert Helpmann, Stanley Holloway
1955	Kiss Me, Kate (Cole Porter)	Jean Fenn, Bob Wright, Harold Lang, Pat Crowley
	The Pajama Game (Richard Adler and Jerry Ross)	Fran Warren, Larry Douglas, Buster West, Pat Stanley
	Kismet (Robert Wright)	William Johnson, Julie Wilson, Henry Calvin, Beatrice Kraft
	Plain and Fancy (Albert Hague)	Alexis Smith, Craig Stevens, Barbara Cook
1956	Rosalinda (Johann Strauss II)	Cyril Ritchard, The Wiere Brothers, Jean Fenn, Lois Hunt, Bob Wright, Sig Arno
	Silk Stockings (Cole Porter)	Don Ameche, Jan Sherwood, Gretchen Wyler, George Tobias
	Damn Yankees (Richard Adler and Jerry Ross)	Bobby Clark, Sherry O’Neil, Allen Case
	The Boy Friend (Sandy Wilson)	Jo Ann Bayless, John Hewer
1957	My Fair Lady (Alan Jay Lerner, Frederick Loewe)	Brian Aherne, Anne Rogers, Charles Victor, Hugh Dempster
	South Pacific (Rodgers and Hammerstein)	Mary Martin, Giorgio Tozzi, Myron McCormick, Richard Banke
	Annie Get Your Gun (Irving Berlin)	Mary Martin, John Raitt, Reta Shaw
	Fanny (Harold Rome)	Italo Tajo, Claude Dauphin, Doretta Morrow, Sig Arno
1958	The King and I (Rodgers and Hammerstein)	Gisele MacKenzie, Cameron Mitchell, Richard Banke
	The Most Happy Fella (Frank Loesser)	Robert Weede, Jo Sullivan, Art Lund
	At The Grand (Robert Wright, George Forrest)	Paul Muni, Joan Diener, Cesare Danova, Neile Adams, John Banner
	The Music Man (Meredith Willson)	Forrest Tucker, Joan Weldon, Cliff Hall, Benny Baker
1959	Bells are Ringing (Comden & Green, Jule Styne)	Judy Holliday, Hal Linden, Alice Pearce
	My Fair Lady (Alan Jay Lerner, Frederick Loewe)	Michael Evans, Diane Todd, Charles Victor, Hugh Dempster
	West Side Story (Leonard Bernstein)	Larry Kert, Sonya Wilde, Devra Korwin
	Oklahoma (Rodgers and Hammerstein)	Jacquelyn McKeever, James Hurst, Bobby Van, Jules Munshin, Helen Gallagher, Murvyn Vye, Reta Shaw, Don Beddoe
1960	Redhead (Albert Hague, Dorothy Fields)	Gwen Verdon, Richard Kiley
	Flower Drum Song (Rodgers and Hammerstein)	Elaine Dunn, Juanita Hall, Keye Luke, Ed Kenney, Jack Soo, Cely Carrillo
	Show Boat (Jerome Kern, Oscar Hammerstein II)	Joe E. Brown, Andy Devine, Julie Wilson, Lawrence Winters, Eddie Foy Jr., Jacquelyn McKeever, Richard Banke, Ruta Lee
	Destry Rides Again (Harold Rome)	John Raitt, Anne Jeffreys, Tom Tully, Phillip Reed
1961	The Merry Widow (Franz Lehár)	Patrice Munsel, Bob Wright, Jean Fenn, Gale Gordon, Sig Arno
	Bye Bye Birdie (Charles Strouse, Lee Adams)	Elaine Dunn, Bill Hayes, Joan Blondell
	The Sound of Music (Rodgers and Hammerstein)	Florence Henderson
	Guys and Dolls (Frank Loesser)	Dan Dailey, Janis Paige, Shelley Berman, Constance Towers, Allen Jenkins, Joey Faye, Maxie Rosenbloom
	Gypsy (Jule Styne, Stephen Sondheim)	Ethel Merman, Julienne Marie, Alfred Sander
1962	Song of Norway (Robert Wright, George Forrest)	Patrice Munsel, John Reardon, Dorothy Coulter, Frank Porretta, Sig Arno, Jerome Cowan, Maralin Niska
	Carnival! (Bob Merrill)	Anna Maria Alberghetti, Ed Ames, James Mitchell, Jo Anne Worley, Johnny Haymer
	Kismet (Robert Wright, George Forrest, Luther Davis)	Alfred Drake, Lee Venora, Anne Jeffreys
	Oliver! (Lionel Bart)	Georgia Brown, Clive Revill
1963	Camelot (Alan Jay Lerner, Frederick Loewe)	Kathryn Grayson, Louis Hayward, Arthur Treacher
	Carousel (Rodgers and Hammerstein)	John Raitt, Jan Clayton, Claramae Turner, Frank Porretta
	How to Succeed in Business Without Really Trying (Frank Loesser)	Dick Kallman, Dyan Cannon, Willard Waterman
	Zenda (Vernon Duke)	Alfred Drake, Anne Rogers, Chita Rivera
1964	Kiss Me, Kate (Cole Porter)	Patrice Munsel, Robert Wright, Elizabeth Allen, Allen Jenkins, Lennie Weinrib, Roy Fizell, Lyle Talbot, Don Beddoe, Virginia Capers, Avon Long
	Little Me (Cy Coleman, Carolyn Leigh, Neil Simon)	Sid Caesar, Virginia Martin, Nancy Andrews
	Here's Love (Meredith Willson)	John Payne, Lisa Kirk, Laurence Naismith
	110 in the Shade (Harvey Schmidt, Tom Jones)	Inga Swenson, Ray Danton, Stephen Douglass, Will Geer, Lesley Ann Warren
1965	The King and I (Rodgers and Hammerstein)	Ricardo Montalbán, Florence Henderson, Lee Venora, Frank Porretta, Jean Sanders, Terence Monk
	Pickwick (Cyril Ornadel)	Harry Secombe, David Jones
	The Great Waltz (Johann Strauss I and Johann Strauss II)	Giorgio Tozzi, Jean Fenn, Frank Porretta, Anita Gillette, Leo Fuchs, Wilbur Evans, Eric Brotherson
	Hello, Dolly! (Jerry Herman)	Carol Channing
1966	Fiddler on the Roof (Jerry Bock, Sheldon Harnick, Joseph Stein)	Luther Adler
	Funny Girl (Jule Styne, Bob Merrill)	Marilyn Michaels, Anthony George
	The Student Prince (Sigmund Romberg)	Frank Porretta, Eileen Christy, Hans Conried, Walter Cassel, Murray Matheson, Irra Petina
	Half a Sixpence (David Heneker)	Dick Kallman, Anne Rogers
1967	Man of La Mancha (Mitch Leigh, Joe Darion, Dale Wasserman)	Richard Kiley, Joan Diener
	Walking Happy (Jimmy Van Heusen, Sammy Cahn)	Norman Wisdom, Anne Rogers, George Rose
	Dumas and Son! (Robert Wright, George Forrest)	Inla TeWiata, Frank Porretta, Constance Towers, Hermione Gingold, Edward Everett Horton
	Show Boat (Jerome Kern, Oscar Hammerstein II)	Pat O'Brien, Eddie Foy Jr., Eileen Christy, John Tyers, Gale Sherwood, Audrey Christie, Robert Mosley
	Hello, Dolly! (Jerry Herman)	Ginger Rogers, David Burns
1968	Cabaret (John Kander, Fred Ebb, Joe Masteroff)	Signe Hasso, Leo Fuchs, Melissa Hart
	Mame (Jerry Herman)	Angela Lansbury
	Rosalinda (adapted from Johann Strauss II's Die Fledermaus)	Jean Fenn, Cyril Ritchard, Hans Conried, The Wiere Brothers, Barbara Meister
	I Do! I Do! (Harvey Schmidt, Tom Jones)	Mary Martin, Robert Preston
1969	My Fair Lady (Lerner and Loewe)	Douglas Fairbanks Jr., Margot Moser, Douglas Campbell, Reginald Gardiner, Cathleen Nesbitt, Terence Monk
	George M! (George M. Cohan)	Joel Grey
	1491 (Meredith Willson)	John Cullum, Jean Fenn, Chita Rivera, Gino Conforti
	Fiddler on the Roof (Jerry Bock, Sheldon Harnick, Joseph Stein)	Harry Goz
	Man of La Mancha (Mitch Leigh, Joe Darion, Dale Wasserman)	José Ferrer, Maura K. Wedge
	Joffrey Ballet	Luis Fuente, Erika Goodman, Gary Chryst
1970	Zorba (John Kander, Fred Ebb)	John Raitt, Barbara Baxley, Chita Rivera
	Promises, Promises (Burt Bacharach, Hal David, Neil Simon)	Tony Roberts, Melissa Hart
	1776 (Sherman Edwards)	Patrick Bedford, Rex Everhart, Jon Cypher
	Lovely Ladies, Kind Gentlemen (Stan Freeman)	Kenneth Nelson, Ron Husmann, Bernie West, David Burns, Eleanor Calbes
	Musical Theater Cavalcade	Juliet Prowse, Bob Wright, Jean Fenn, Frank Porretta, John Reardon, Gilbert Price, Joyce Bryant, William Friml, Sterling Holloway, John Green
1971	Coco (Alan Jay Lerner, Andre Previn)	Katharine Hepburn
	Company (Stephen Sondheim)	George Chakiris, Elaine Stritch
	Knickerbocker Holiday (Kurt Weill, Maxwell Anderson)	Burt Lancaster, David Holliday, Anita Gillette
	Candide (Leonard Bernstein)	Frank Porretta, Mary Costa, Douglas Campbell
1972	Applause (Charles Strouse, Lee Adams)	Lauren Bacall, Don Chastain, Penny Fuller
	No, No, Nanette (Vincent Youmans)	June Allyson, Dennis Day, Sandra Deel, Judy Canova, Jerry Antes
	The Rothschilds (Jerry Bock, Sheldon Harnick)	Hal Linden, C. David Colson
	The Sound of Music (Rodgers and Hammerstein)	Sally Ann Howes, Bob Wright, Werner Klemperer, Patricia Morison, Jean Sanders
1973	Oliver! (Lionel Bart)	Ron Moody, Karen Morrow, David Jones, Colin Duffy, Jon Cypher
	Two Gentlemen of Verona (Galt MacDermot, John Guare)	Jonelle Allen, Clifton Davis, Stockard Channing, Larry Kert
	Gigi (Lerner and Loewe)	Alfred Drake, Agnes Moorehead, Maria Karnilova, Daniel Massey, Terese Stevens
	Gone With The Wind (Harold Rome)	Lesley Ann Warren, Pernell Roberts, Terence Monk, Udana Power
1974	The King and I (Rodgers and Hammerstein)	Ricardo Montalbán, Sally Ann Howes, Emily Yancy, Helen Bliss/Jean Sanders, David Cryer
	Porgy and Bess	Clamma Dale, Leona Mitchell, LaVerne Williams, Robert Mosley, Thomas Carey, Ralph Wilcox, Robert Monroe, James Randolph, Carol Brice, Ruby Jones
	Mack & Mabel (Jerry Herman)	Robert Preston, Bernadette Peters, Lisa Kirk, James Mitchell
	Fiddler on the Roof (Jerry Bock, Sheldon Harnick, Joseph Stein)	Robert Merrill, Peg Murray, Michael Kermoyan, Helen Verbit, Richard Balin, Larry Ross, Helena Grenot, Judy Kaye, Elizabeth Hale, Fred Weiss, Fyvush Finkel, Baruch Lumet
	Sugar (Jule Styne, Bob Merrill, Peter Stone)	Robert Morse, Larry Kert, Gale Gordon, Leland Palmer, Steve Condos, Virginia Martin, Joe Ross
1975	How to Succeed in Business Without Really Trying (Frank Loesser)	Robert Morse, Rudy Vallee, Penny Worth, Joy Claussen, Christian Grey, Sammy Smith, John Myhers, Ruth Kobart, Mary Jo Catlett, Bill Mullikin
	Odyssey (Mitch Leigh, Erich Segal)	Yul Brynner, Joan Diener, Russ Thacker, Diana Davila, Martin Vidnovic, Shev Rodgers
	Wonderful Town (Leonard Bernstein, Comden and Green)	Nanette Fabray, George Gaynes, Marti Rolph, Jack Kruschen, Mary Wickes/Fran Ryan, Joseph Burke, Fredd Wayne
	Camelot (Lerner and Loewe)	Robert Goulet/Edward Mulhare, Carol Lawrence/Anne Rogers, Ron Husmann, Victor Buono/Gale Gordon
1976	The Baker's Wife (Stephen Schwartz)	Topol, Carole Demas/Patti LuPone, Keene Curtis, Kurt Peterson, David Rounds, Timothy Jerome
	The Wiz (Charlie Smalls)	Renn Woods/Renee Harris, Ben Harney, Valentino, Ted Ross/Ken Prymus, Andre DeShields, Dee Dee Bridgewater/Roz Clark, Vivian Bonnell, Ella Mitchell
	Kismet (Robert Wright, George Forrest, Luther Davis)	John Reardon, Rhonda Fleming, Victoria Mallory, George Gaynes, Martin Vidnovic, Jack Manning
	Pacific Overtures (Stephen Sondheim)	Mako, Soon-Teck Oh, Sab Shimono, Haruki Fujimoto/Kenneth S. Eiland, Isao Sato
1977	Irma La Douce (Marguerite Monnot)	Larry Kert, Priscilla Lopez, George S. Irving, H.F. Green, Mickey Morton
	Annie Get Your Gun (Irving Berlin)	Debbie Reynolds, Harve Presnell, Gavin MacLeod, Bibi Osterwald, Art Lund, Manu Tupou, Don Potter, Peter Bruni
	The Wiz (Charlie Smalls)	Renee Harris, Ben Harney, Ken Prymus, Charles Valentino, Kamal, Vivian Bonnell, Roz Clark, Carolyn Miller
	Shine It On (John Kander, Fred Ebb)	Liza Minnelli, Barry Nelson
1978	Chicago (John Kander, Fred Ebb)	Gwen Verdon, Chita Rivera, Jerry Orbach, Mary McCarty
	Pippin (Stephen Schwartz)	Michael Rupert, Larry Riley, Eric Berry, Thelma Carpenter
	Pal Joey (Rodgers and Hart, John O'Hara)	Lena Horne, Clifton Davis, Josephine Premice
	The Sound of Music (Rodgers and Hammerstein)	Florence Henderson, Edward Mulhare, Jean Fenn
1979	Evita (Andrew Lloyd Webber, Tim Rice)	Patti LuPone, Mandy Patinkin, Bob Gunton
	Dancin'	The National Company
	On The Twentieth Century (Cy Coleman, Comden and Green)	Rock Hudson, Judy Kaye, Imogene Coca
	Bells Are Ringing (Jule Styne, Comden and Green)	Florence Henderson, Dean Jones
1980	Guys and Dolls (Frank Loesser)	Milton Berle, Jed Allan, Maureen Arthur, Elizabeth Hansen, Taylor Reed
	The Umbrellas of Cherbourg (Michel Legrand, Jacques Demy)	Louis Valenzi, Indira Stefanianna, Stuart Baker-Bergen, Mace Barrett, Donna Bullock, Shirley Chester
	On a Clear Day You Can See Forever (Alan Jay Lerner, Burton Lane)	Robert Goulet, Joanna Gleason, Sally Kemp, Bill Biskup, Rod Loomis, Elizabeth Savage
1981	Little Johnny Jones (George M. Cohan)	David Cassidy, Jack Bittner, Maureen Brennan, Randall Easterbrook, Jane Galloway
	The Pirates of Penzance (Gilbert and Sullivan)	Barry Bostwick, Pam Dawber, Andy Gibb, Clive Revill, Jo Ann Worley
	Sweeney Todd (Stephen Sondheim)	Angela Lansbury, George Hearn, Ken Jennings, Edmund Lyndeck, Cris Groenendaal
	Fiddler on the Roof (Jerry Bock, Sheldon Harnick, Joseph Stein)	Herschel Bernardi, Chevi Colton, Ruth Jaroslow, Paul Lipson
1982	Seven Brides for Seven Brothers (Johnny Mercer, Gene de Paul)	Debby Boone, David James Carroll, Craig Peralta, Nancy Fox, Jeff Calhoun
	A Doll's Life (Comden and Green, Larry Grossman)	George Hearn, Betsy Joslyn, Peter Gallagher, Edmund Lyndeck, Barbara Lang
	Show Boat (Jerome Kern, Oscar Hammerstein II)	Donald O’Connor, Lonette McKee, Jacque Trussel, Sheryl Woods, Karla Burns
	Hello, Dolly! (Jerry Herman)	Carol Channing, Tom Batten, Pamela Kalt, Jan Neuberger, John Gallogly, P.J.Nelson
	Don Quixote	Boston Ballet, Rudolph Nureyev
1983	Zorba (John Kander, Fred Ebb)	Anthony Quinn, Lila Kedrova, Robert Westenberg, Taro Meyer, Charles Karel
	Woman of the Year (John Kander, Fred Ebb)	Lauren Bacall, Harry Guardino, Emory Bass, Marilyn Cooper, Kathleen Freeman
	Chaplin	Anthony Newley, Andrea Marcovicci, Jim MacGeorge, Scott Grimes, John Allee
	Nine	Sergio Franchi, Leigh Beery, Jacqueline Douguet, Diane M. Hurley, Lauren Mitchell
1984	Evita (Andrew Lloyd Webber, Tim Rice)	Florence Lacey, Tim Bowman, John Leslie Wolfe, Donna Marie Elio, Michael Licata
	Doug Henning's World of Magic	Doug Henning, Debbie Henning, Victor Heineman, D.J. Mergenthaler, Gina Rose
	La Cage aux Folles (Jerry Herman)	Gene Barry, Walter Charles, Carol Teitel, Joseph Breen, Robert Burr, Mollie Smith
	Sugar (Jule Styne, Bob Merrill, Peter Stone)	Joe Namath, Robert Morse, Jack Carter, Mary Ann O’Reilly, Steve Condos, Kelly Britt
1985	Sweet Charity (Cy Coleman, Dorothy Fields, Neil Simon)	Debbie Allen, Michael Rupert, Bebe Neuwirth, Allison Williams, Mark Jacoby, Carol Alt
	South Pacific (Rodgers and Hammerstein)	Richard Kiley, Meg Bussert, Novella Nelson, Brent Barrett, Al Mancini, Jade Go
1986	Me and My Girl (Noel Gay)	Robert Lindsay, Maryann Plunkett, George S. Irving, Jane Summerhays
	On Your Toes (Rodgers and Hart)	Natalia Makarova, Dina Merrill, Lara Teeter, George de la Pena, Michael Kermoyan
1987	Cabaret (John Kander, Fred Ebb, Joe Masteroff)	Joel Grey, Alyson Reed, Regina Resnick, Werner Klemperer, Gregg Edelman, David Staller
