= 1491 (musical) =

American musical

- Cover of 1969 souvenir program
- Music: Meredith Willson
- Lyrics: Meredith Willson
- Book: Meredith Willson; Richard Morris
- Productions: 1969 Los Angeles / San Francisco

1491 is a musical centered around Christopher Columbus before his voyage to discover the New World. Music and lyrics are by American composer and playwright Meredith Willson. It was Willson's final musical. The book was by Willson and Richard Morris (Note: Morris' other credits include the screenplay of the 1967 film Thoroughly Modern Millie.) with additional material by Ira Barmak, (Note: Barmak's other credits including production of the 1987 film Hotel Colonial.) and was based on an idea by Ed Ainsworth, a columnist for the Los Angeles Times.

== History ==
The musical was intended to open in California in 1967, before transferring to Broadway. Willson spent two years researching Columbus and traveling in Spain and Italy for possible material.

Produced by the Los Angeles Civic Light Opera, the musical opened in Los Angeles on September 2, 1969, and later transferred to San Francisco where it closed on December 13, 1969. The musical closed before reaching Broadway.

Richard Morris was the director, Edwin Lester was the producer, and Danny Daniels was the choreographer. John Cullum starred as Christopher Columbus and Chita Rivera starred as his mistress. Jean Fenn played Queen Isabella. Initially, Sergio Franchi had been cast as Columbus.
