= Anya (musical) =

- Original cast recording
- Music: Robert Wright; George Forrest; Based on themes by: Sergei Rachmaninoff
- Lyrics: Robert Wright; George Forrest
- Book: George Abbott; Guy Bolton
- Basis: Marcelle Maurette's play Anastasia and Anastasia 1956 film
- Productions: 1965 Broadway

Anya is a musical with a book by George Abbott and Guy Bolton and music and lyrics by Robert Wright and George Forrest. As they had done with Song of Norway (1944) and Kismet (1953), Wright and Forrest developed the musical score using themes written by a classical composer, in this case Sergei Rachmaninoff.

Based on Bolton's 1954 English adaptation of Marcelle Maurette's 1952 play Anastasia and the subsequent 1956 film adaptation of the same name, it focuses on Anya who, when discovered in a Berlin psychiatric facility in 1925 by taxi driver Bounine, a former Cossack general in Czarist Russia, claims to be Anastasia, the supposedly murdered youngest daughter of Emperor Nicholas II.

A number of fictional elements, including a romantic triangle involving Anya, Bounine, and his mistress Genia and the addition of a comical character, café proprietor Katrina, weakened the plot of the true story. It also continued to perpetuate the notion that the Dowager Empress had met Anya in real life, when in fact the two never crossed paths.

After sixteen previews, the Broadway production, directed by Abbott and choreographed by Hanya Holm, opened on November 29, 1965, at the Ziegfeld Theatre. Denounced as an old-fashioned operetta by the critics, it closed after only 16 performances, the last production to be presented in the historic venue, which had housed the original Show Boat in 1927.

The cast included Constance Towers as Anya, Michael Kermoyan as Bounine, Karen Shepard as Genia, Irra Petina as Katrina, and Lillian Gish as the Dowager Empress. Supporting roles were played by George S. Irving and John Michael King.

The production was nominated for the Tony Award for Best Scenic Design. An original cast recording was released by United Artists Records.

The show was later reworked under several names: A Song for Anastasia (1967), The Anastasia Game (1989 and 1990), The Anastasia Affaire (1992), and Anastasia, the Musical (1998). A cast recording was made in 1992 using mostly 1989 cast which was re-released and expanded in 1998.

== Song list ==
Act I

- A Song from Somewhere
- Vodka, Vodka!
- So Proud
- Homeward
- Snowflakes and Sweethearts (The Snowbird Song)
- On That Day
- Anya
- Six Palaces
- Hand in Hand
- This Is My Kind of Love
- On That Day (Reprise)

Act II

- That Prelude!
- A Quiet Land
- Here Tonight, Tomorrow Where?
- Leben Sie Wohl
- If This Is Goodbye
- Little Hands
- All Hail The Empress
