= Kenneth Edwards =

Kenneth Edwards may refer to:

- Kenneth Edwards (golfer) (1886–1952), American golfer
- Kenneth Edwards (taekwondo) (born 1985), Jamaican taekwondo athlete
- Ken Edwards (born 1950), British poet
- Kent Edwards (c. 1918–1993), American actor and singer

== See also ==
- Kenny Edwards (1946–2010), American singer, songwriter and musician
