= Kent Edwards =

American actor and singer

Kent Edwards (born c. 1918 — died August 7, 1993) was an American musical theatre actor and nightclub singer of the 1940s who is best remembered for portraying Einar in the original production of Song of Norway at the Los Angeles Civic Light Opera, on Broadway, and in the 1946-1947 national tour. He recorded the role for Decca Records on the 1945 cast album.

== Career ==
Born Kenneth Edwards in Wichita, Kansas, he began his career in Hollywood; making his stage debut in Bob Wright and Chet Forrest's 1940 musical revue Thank You, Columbus at the Hollywood Playhouse. He made his Broadway debut in the revue New Faces of 1943; performing in that work from December 22, 1942, through March 13, 1943. In 1944 he originated the role of Einar in Robert Wright and George Forrest's operetta Song of Norway which he performed not only at its premiere at the Los Angeles Civic Light Opera, but also on Broadway from Aug 21, 1944 through September 7, 1946. He continued with the work on its National tour in 1946–1947. He also toured the United States with Milton Berle in Spring in Brazil.

In addition to performing in musicals, Edwards performed as a nightclub singer. He was a regular at the Colonial Inn in Hallandale, Florida in the late 1940s. He also appeared in night clubs in Hollywood, Chicago and New York City; including the Copacabana.

He died in Miami, Florida of a heart attack at the age of 75.
