= ASCAP Foundation Richard Rodgers Award =

American music award

- Awarded for: lifetime achievement in musical theatre
- Country: United States
- Presented by: American Society of Composers, Authors and Publishers (ASCAP)
- First award: 1983
- Final award: 2006
- Website: www.ascap.com

The ASCAP Foundation Richard Rodgers Award is an annual award presented by the American Society of Composers, Authors and Publishers (ASCAP), in recognition of lifetime achievement by composers and lyricists in musical theatre. Established by Dorothy Rodgers in honor of her late husband Richard Rodgers, the award was first presented to Howard Dietz in 1983. The honor was not presented in 1992, 1994, 2004, or 2005, and years with more than one recipient include 1984, 1990, 1993, 1995, and 1997.

The most recent recipient is Stephen Schwartz, who was presented the award in 2011. Betty Comden is the only female to receive the award. American composers or lyricists have received the Richard Rodgers Award each year it has been presented except in 1988 when British-born Jule Styne won the honor.

== Recipients ==
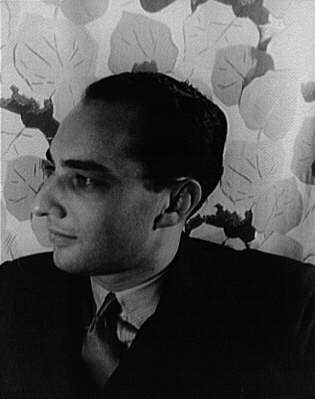
Arthur Schwartz in 1933

Year	Recipient	Lifetime	Nationality	Ref.
1983	Howard Dietz	1896–1983	United States	
1984	Harold Arlen	1905–1986	United States	
1984	Arthur Schwartz	1900–1984	United States	
1985	Harold Rome	1908–1993	United States	
1986	Jay Gorney	1894–1990	United States	
1987	Edward Eliscu	1902–1998	United States	
1988	Jule Styne	1905–1994	United Kingdom; United States	
1989	Irving Caesar	1895–1996	United States	
1990	Hugh Martin	1914–2011	United States	
1990	Ralph Blane	1914–1995	United States	
1991	Burton Lane	1912–1997	United States	
1992	—	—	—	—
1993	Harvey Schmidt	b. 1929	United States	
1993	Tom Jones	b. 1928	United States	
1994	—	—	—	—
1995	George Forrest	1915–1999	United States	
1995	Robert Wright	1914–2005	United States	
1996	Marshall Barer	1923–1998	United States	
1997	Betty Comden	1917–2006	United States	
1997	Adolph Green	1914–2002	United States	
1998	Jerry Herman	b. 1931	United States	
1999	Charles Strouse	b. 1928	United States	
2000	Cy Coleman	1929–2004	United States	
2001	Richard Adler	1921–2012	United States	
2002	Stephen Sondheim	b. 1930	United States	
2003	Lee Adams	b. 1924	United States	
2004	—	—	—	—
2005	—	—	—	—
2006	Marvin Hamlisch	1944–2012	United States	
2007	—	—	—	—
2008	—	—	—	—
2009	—	—	—	—
2010	—	—	—	—
2011	Stephen Schwartz	b. 1948	United States	—

== See also ==
- ASCAP Foundation Richard Rodgers New Horizons Award
