= Peter Pan (1954 musical) =

1954 musical adaptation

- Original Cast Recording
- Music: Mark Charlap Additional Music Jule Styne
- Lyrics: Carolyn Leigh Additional Lyrics Betty Comden & Adolph Green
- Book: Jerome Robbins
- Basis: Peter Pan by J. M. Barrie
- Premiere: October 20, 1954: Winter Garden Theatre, New York City, NY
- Productions: 1954 Broadway; 1979 Broadway revival 1990 Broadway revival 1998 Broadway revival 2024 National Tour
- Awards: 1955 Tony Award for Best Actress in a Musical; 1955 Tony Award for Best Featured Actor in a Musical; 1955 Tony Award for Best Stage Technician

Peter Pan is a 1954 musical based on J. M. Barrie's 1904 play Peter Pan and his 1911 novelization of it, Peter and Wendy. The music is by Moose Charlap and the lyrics by Carolyn Leigh.

The original Broadway production, starring Mary Martin as Peter and Cyril Ritchard as Captain Hook, earned Tony Awards for both stars. It was followed by NBC telecasts of it in 1955, 1956, and 1960 with the same stars, plus several rebroadcasts of the 1960 telecast. In 2014, the musical was broadcast on NBC featuring several new numbers, and starring Allison Williams and Christopher Walken. The show has enjoyed several revivals onstage.

In 2024, a national tour launched, directed by Lonny Price, with a new book by Larissa Fasthorse.

== Background and original 1954 production ==
Several productions of Peter Pan were staged early in the 20th century, starting in London in 1904, starring Nina Boucicault as Peter and on Broadway in 1905, starring Maude Adams. In a nod to the original play, and the pantomime tradition it derives from, the title role of Peter Pan in the musical has usually been played by a woman, including Mary Martin, Sandy Duncan and Cathy Rigby, among others.

Producer Edwin Lester, founder and director of the Los Angeles Civic Light Opera, acquired the American rights to adapt Peter Pan as a play with music for actress Mary Martin. The show was a box office success, but critics expected it to have more musical numbers that featured Mary Martin, so director Jerome Robbins hired lyricists Comden and Green and composer Jule Styne to add more songs, including "Never Never Land", "Distant Melody" and several other numbers, turning the show into a full-scale musical. The musical, instead of using Barrie's original ending, in which Wendy returns to the Neverland for spring cleaning, includes an additional scene that Barrie had written later and titled An Afterthought (later included by Barrie in his 1911 novelization Peter and Wendy). In this ending, Peter returns after many years to take Wendy back to the Never Never Land for spring cleaning. He finds that he has been away so long that Wendy is now an adult, married woman with a daughter. Despondent at first, he is delighted when Wendy's daughter Jane offers to be his new mother, and instead takes her with him.

The musical premiered at the Curran Theatre in San Francisco on July 19, 1954. The initial four-week run was followed by an eight-week engagement in Los Angeles. The show opened on Broadway on October 20, 1954 at the Winter Garden Theatre for a planned limited run of 152 performances. The busy 1954 Broadway season also included The Boy Friend, Fanny, Silk Stockings and Damn Yankees. While still in tryouts, a deal was made for Peter Pan to be broadcast on the NBC anthology series Producers' Showcase on March 7, 1955, which ensured that it was a financial success despite the limited run. The revised score and Tony Award-winning performances by Martin and Cyril Ritchard, as Captain Hook, made the musical a critical success, and tickets sold out throughout the Broadway run. The show closed on February 26, 1955 to prepare for the television broadcast.

A Broadway cast album of the songs is still in print.

== Television productions ==
In 1954, Fred Coe, production manager for NBC in New York, began work on Producers' Showcase, a 90-minute anthology series that aired every fourth Monday for three seasons. One aim of the series was to broadcast expensive color spectaculars to promote the new color television system developed by NBC's parent company RCA.

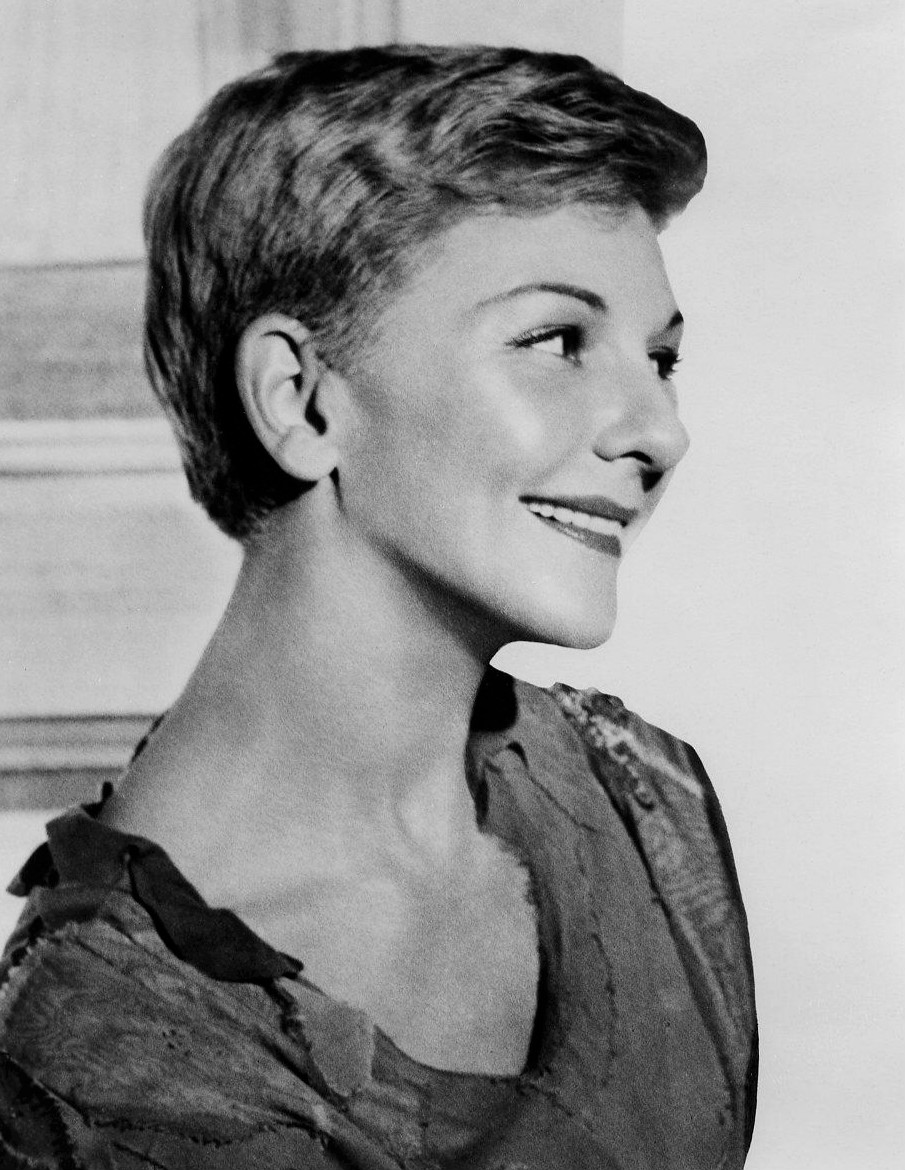
Martin as Peter Pan

On March 7, 1955, NBC presented Peter Pan live as part of Producers' Showcase (with nearly all of the show's original cast) as the first full-length Broadway production on color TV. The show attracted a then-record audience of 65-million viewers, the highest ever up to that time for a single television program. Mary Martin and Cyril Ritchard had already won Tony Awards for their stage performances, and Martin won an Emmy Award for the television production. It was so well received that the musical was restaged live for television (again on Producers' Showcase) on January 9, 1956. Both of these broadcasts were produced live and in color, but only black-and-white kinescope recordings survive.

Peter Pan was restaged on December 8, 1960, this time in a 100-minute version rather than 90 minutes (not counting the commercials), and with a slightly different cast because the original children had outgrown their roles. Producers' Showcase had long since gone off the air, so the 1960 production was intended as a "stand alone" special instead of an episode of an anthology series. Act II was split into two acts, for a total of five acts instead of three, to allow for more commercial breaks. This version was videotaped in color at NBC's Brooklyn studio. Martin was also starring in Broadway's The Sound of Music at the time. The production was directed for television by Vincent J. Donehue, who received a Director's Guild Award for it. Peter Foy re-created the signature flying sequences he had staged for the 1954 Broadway production and the two Producers' Showcase broadcasts. This 1960 version was rebroadcast in 1963, 1966 and 1973. The video tape of that production was restored and rebroadcast by NBC on March 24, 1989, then again on March 31, 1991, after which it went to the Disney Channel, where it was shown several times more. Beginning in 1989, the program was slightly cut to make room for more commercial time. Eliminated completely was a dance that Liza (the Darling family maid) and the animals of Neverland perform to an orchestral version of Never Never Land. Also eliminated was Mary Martin's curtain speech at the end thanking NBC for making the program possible, which, in the 1960, 1963, and 1966 telecasts led directly into the closing credits. Gone also was the intertitle bearing the credit Peter Pan: Act III, but not the other intertitle credits, so that the show seemed to be performed in three acts, just as in the stage version.

This 1960 production of Peter Pan was released on VHS and LaserDisc home video in 1990 and on DVD on October 19, 1999. None of the three Mary Martin television versions of Peter Pan was telecast from a theatre with a live audience. All three were performed in the NBC studios. In 2000, A&E presented a TV production of the Broadway show, starring Cathy Rigby, recorded in front of a live audience.

In 2014, NBC broadcast Peter Pan Live!, a new production of the musical starring Allison Williams as Peter, Christopher Walken as Captain Hook, Kelli O'Hara as Mrs. Darling, Christian Borle as Mr. Darling/Smee and Minnie Driver as the adult Wendy. Critical reviews were mixed, with many reviewers expressing relief that the broadcast was not a disaster.

== Casts of major productions ==
Character	1954 Broadway	1955 broadcast	1956 broadcast	1960 broadcast	1979 Broadway	1990 Broadway	1991 Broadway	1998 Broadway	2024 National Tour
Peter Pan	Mary Martin	Mary Martin	Mary Martin	Mary Martin	Sandy Duncan	Cathy Rigby	Cathy Rigby	Cathy Rigby	Nolan Almeida
Captain Hook/Mr. Darling	Cyril Ritchard	Cyril Ritchard	Cyril Ritchard	Cyril Ritchard	George Rose	Stephen Hanan	J. K. Simmons	Paul Schoeffler	Cody Garcia
Wendy Darling	Kathleen Nolan	Kathleen Nolan	Kathleen Nolan	Maureen Bailey	Marsha Kramer	Cindy Robinson	Cindy Robinson	Elisa Sagardia	Hawa Kamara
Jane	Kathleen Nolan	Kathleen Nolan	Kathleen Nolan	Maureen Bailey	Marisa Morell	Cindy Robinson	Cindy Robinson	Aileen Quinn	Christina Helene Braa
Tiger Lily	Sondra Lee	Sondra Lee	Sondra Lee	Sondra Lee	Maria Pogee	Holly Irwin	Michelle Schumacher	Dana Solimando	Raye Zaragoza
John Darling	Robert Harrington	Robert Harrington	Michael Allen	Joey Trent	Alexander Winter	Britt West	David Burdick	Barry Cavanagh	William Foon; Micah Turner Lee
Michael Darling	Joseph Stafford	Joseph Stafford	Tom Halloran	Kent Fletcher	Jonathan Ward	Chad Hutchison	Joey Cee	Drake English	Reed Epley; Jayden Guarneri
Mr. Smee	Joe E. Marks	Joe E. Marks	Joe E. Marks	Joe E. Marks	Arnold Soboloff	Don Potter	Don Potter	Michael Nostrand	Kurt Perry
Mrs. Darling	Margalo Gillmore	Margalo Gillmore	Margalo Gillmore	Margalo Gillmore	Beth Fowler	Lauren Thompson	Lauren Thompson	Barbara McCulloh	Shefali Deshpande
Adult Wendy	Sally Brophy	Ann Connolly	Peggy Maurer	Peggy Maurer	Neva Rae Powers	Lauren Thompson	Lauren Thompson	Barbara McCulloh	Hawa Kamara
Tootles	Ian Tucker	Ian Tucker	Ian Tucker	David Komoroff	Carl Tramon	Julian Brightman	Julian Brightman	Aileen Quinn	Charles Antenen
Slightly	David Bean	David Bean	David Bean	Edmund Gaynes	Chris Farr	Christopher Ayres	Christopher Ayres	Scott Bridges	Jonah Barricklo
Curly	Stanley Stenner	Stanley Stenner	Stanley Stenner	Bill Snowden	Michael Estes	Alon Williams	Alon Williams	Alon Williams	Brandon Gille
Nibs	Paris Theodore	Paris Theodore	Paris Theodore	Carson Woods	Dennis Courtney	—N/a	—N/a	—N/a	Leo Gallegos
The Twins	Alan Sutherland; Darryl Duran	Jackie Scholle; Darryl Duran	Alan Sutherland; Harold Day	Brad Herrman; Luke Halpin	Rusty Jacobs; Joey Abbott	Janet Kay Higgins; Courtney Wyn	Janet Kay Higgins; Courtney Wyn	Janet Kay Higgins; Doreen Chila	William Foon; Micah Turner Lee; Reed Epley; Jayden Guarneri

== Later productions ==
The show was revived in 1979 on Broadway at the Lunt-Fontanne Theatre, produced by Nancy and Ronnie Horowitz, starring Sandy Duncan and George Rose, and ran for 554 performances. Duncan was nominated for the Best Actress Tony, and the show was nominated for Best Revival of a Musical.

A third Broadway production was mounted in 1990, originally at the Lunt-Fontanne, running for 45 performances. A return engagement opened 10 months later, this time at the Minskoff Theatre, running for an additional 48 performances. Both engagements starred former Olympic gymnast Cathy Rigby as Peter; the first co-starred Stephen Hanan and the second J. K. Simmons. The production was nominated for Best Revival of a Musical at the 1991 Tonys, and Rigby was nominated for Best Actress. Rigby returned to Broadway as Peter Pan in 1998 at the Marquis Theatre, with Paul Schoeffler co-starring. This production ran for 48 performances. A return engagement with the same stars opened in 1999 at the George Gershwin Theatre and ran for 166 performances. This engagement was nominated for the 1999 Tony for Best Revival of a Musical. The performance was recorded at the La Mirada Theater for broadcast in October 2000 on the A&E Network. The video release cuts the program to about 96 minutes, directed by Gary Halvorson. It reconceived the potentially offensive "Ugg-a-Wugg" song about Native Americans as a percussive dance number. The flying effects were changed to include some flights that were not practical to do in the theatrical version, such as the somersault flips during "I'm Flying", and electronically erasing the wires.

The Cathy Rigby production was brought to Riyadh, Saudi Arabia in November 2019 as the first Broadway show to be produced in the kingdom. The show was well received and included the lead of Peter Pan being portrayed by a woman with fans lining up after for autographs and photos.

A new North American tour featuring a heavily revised book by Native American playwright Larissa FastHorse opened in February 2024, after playing previews in December of the previous year. This production, directed by Lonny Price, features several major alterations, changing the musical's Edwardian London setting to modern day America. The song "Ugg-a-Wugg" is replaced by "Friends Forever," which was adapted from the song "Come Once in a Lifetime" from the 1961 musical Subways Are for Sleeping, also by Comden, Green, and Styne (Green's daughter, Amanda Green, wrote new lyrics). The Native American tribe is replaced by a tribe of individuals from different cultures, all of whom are the last of their kind and have come to Neverland to preserve their traditions. This tour also restores the song "When I Went Home," a lament sung by Peter describing the sight of another boy sleeping in his bed when he once tried to return home from Neverland. The song, which was also featured in the 2014 NBC television broadcast, was written for the original 1954 production, but was cut before the Broadway premiere at the request of Mary Martin.

== Synopsis ==
=== Act I ===
The Darling nursery

As Mr. and Mrs. Darling prepare for an evening out, two of their children, Wendy and John, play at being their parents. When Mrs. Darling notices Michael is left out, she gets him into the game and joins in with all of them watched by the dog Nana, their nursemaid. When Mr. Darling comes in to have his tie tied, he questions having a dog as a nursemaid, but Mrs. Darling defends her. The previous week, while the children slept, Nana saw a boy in the room who flew out of the window before she could catch him, leaving behind his shadow, which Mrs. Darling has put away in a drawer. In spite of this, Mr. Darling still insists on Nana spending the night downstairs tied up. Mrs. Darling and the children sing a lullaby ("Tender Shepherd").

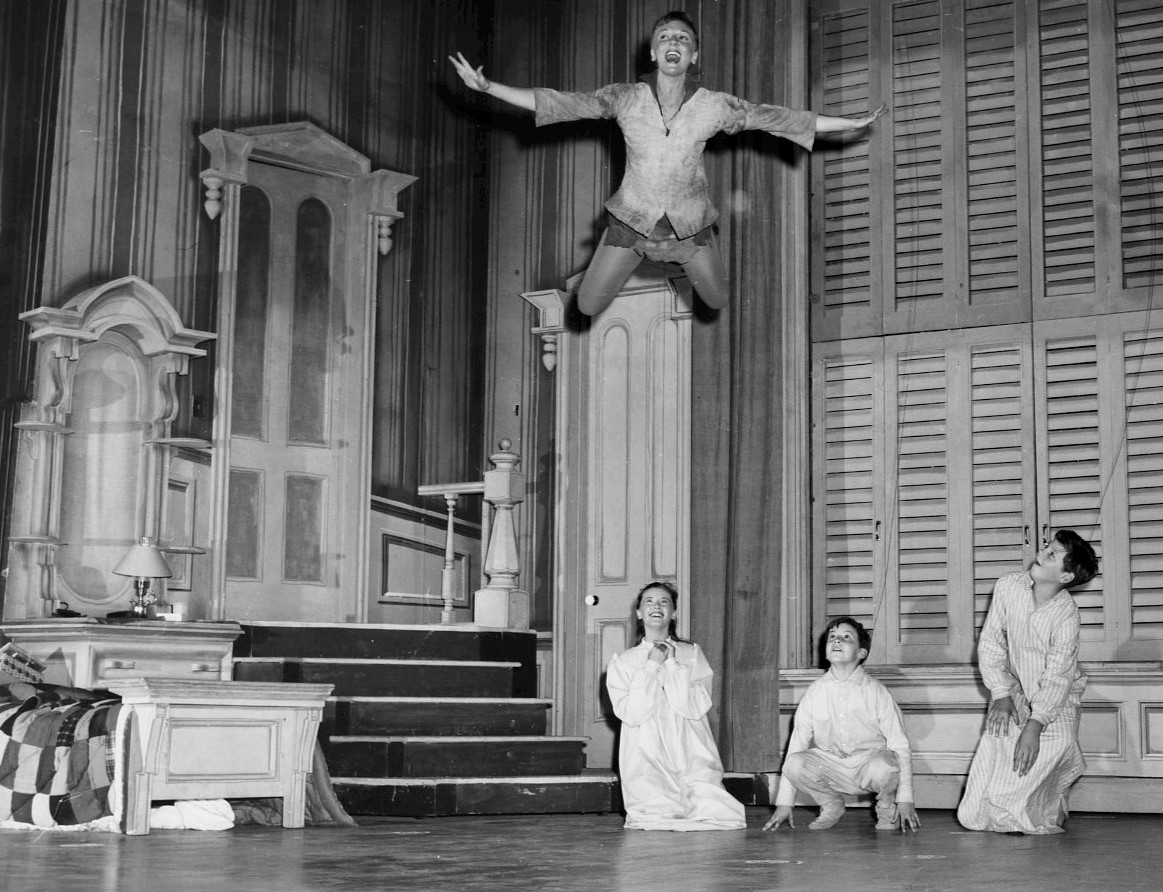
Peter Pan (Mary Martin) shows the Darling children he can fly; Kathy Nolan plays Wendy (1954)

The children fall asleep. A fairy, Tinker Bell, and Peter Pan fly in through the window to look for his shadow. Wendy is awakened by the boy's cries when he is unable to re-attach his shadow and helps him by sewing it back on. Peter is thrilled when his shadow is re-attached ("I've Gotta Crow") and tells her that he lives in Neverland ("Never Never Land") with the Lost Boys. Peter gives her a "kiss" (a button) that Wendy puts around her neck after giving him a "kiss" (a thimble). Wendy wakes her brothers up, and Peter invites them all to Neverland, and promises to teach them to fly. Peter happily launches himself into the air ("I'm Flying").

Peter sprinkles the children with fairy dust and tells them to "think lovely thoughts" ("I'm Flying – Reprise"). The children follow Peter, but Michael goes back when the maid, Liza, comes into the room, giving her some of his fairy dust and inviting her to come to Neverland with them. In later Broadway revivals, the Liza scene is replaced with Peter and the Darling children flying over London on their way to Neverland.

=== Act II ===
Neverland

In Neverland, Peter's "Lost Boys" are standing outside their underground lair, wondering when he will return, when they hear Captain Hook and his pirates ("Pirate March"). The boys hide. Hook tells Smee, his right-hand man, that he wants to kill Peter, because he cut off his hand and threw it to a crocodile, which has since then developed a taste for Hook and follows him around. He had to replace his hand with a hook. Luckily for Hook, the crocodile has swallowed a clock that ticks and alerts Hook to its presence. Hook accidentally stumbles upon the entrance to the hideout, and summons Smee and his men to provide background music while he plans the Boys' demise ("Hook's Tango"), a rich cake with poisonous icing. Hook suddenly hears a loud tick-tock; the crocodile appears but Hook escapes. The pirates flee, and the Boys reappear, thinking they are safe. Suddenly, a group of "Indians" appears, led by Tiger Lily ("Indians"). They leave the Boys alone, and go on hunting the pirates.

The Lost Boys suddenly spot Wendy in the sky and thinking she is a bird, one of them shoots an arrow. Peter, Michael and John land and think that the arrow is lodged in her heart, but instead find it stuck in the button Peter gave her and she is not dead. The Lost Boys build a house around her, hoping that she will become their mother ("Wendy"), to which, when she wakes up, she agrees. Hook plants the cake, but Wendy doesn't let the children eat it as she knows it wouldn't be good for them; instead, she tells the Boys stories, including Cinderella. Hook is infuriated that the Boys have found a mother. He plots to kidnap Wendy and the Boys, while Smee and the pirates play another song "Hook's Tarantella". After the pirates leave for their ship, Liza arrives and dances with the animals of Neverland while Peter keeps watch outside the house.

A few days pass with everyone having adventures. One day in the forest, after Peter leads the Boys in their anthem ("I Won't Grow Up"), they almost run into the pirates, who have captured Tiger Lily and tie her to a tree. Peter hides and mimics Hook's voice, ordering the men to release her. When Hook arrives, he is enraged and demands that the "spirit of the forest" speak to him. Peter tricks them all into thinking he is Hook, and that the real Hook is a codfish. Hook asks the "spirit" to reveal its true identity. Peter obliges, pretending to be a "beautiful lady" ("Oh, My Mysterious Lady") but is discovered in the end. Hook and his pirates try to ambush Peter, but they are chased away by Tiger Lily and her tribe of Native Americans.

Back at the hideout, Tiger Lily and her tribe are almost shot by the Boys, until Peter reveals the truce between them. They smoke a peace pipe and vow eternal friendship ("Ugg-a-Wugg"). Tiger Lily and her Indians leave to stand guard around the house above. Wendy asks Peter to sing the Boys a lullaby ("Distant Melody") based on a song he remembered in his youth. Michael and John want to return home, and Wendy admits to being homesick, too. The Boys wish they had parents, and Wendy offers hers to all of them. Everyone is excited about being adopted, except Peter, who says he will not go because he knows he will grow up if he does. Wendy tells him she will come back once a year to do his spring cleaning.

The pirates attack and subdue the Indians. They give Peter a fake all-clear signal, so Peter sadly sends Wendy, her brothers, and the Lost Boys on their way. Before she leaves, Wendy sets out Peter's "medicine" (a drop of water) for him to take before bed. After she tearfully leaves, Peter, who pretended not to care, throws himself on a bed and cries himself to sleep. As they leave the underground house, Wendy and the boys are captured by the pirates. Hook then sneaks into the lair and poisons Peter's "medicine". Tinker Bell awakens Peter, tells him of the ambush, and warns him about the poison, but he waves her off as he prepares for a rescue. Desperate, she drinks the poison herself. Dying, she tells Peter that if every boy and girl who believes in fairies would clap their hands, she would live. Peter asks the audience to believe and clap their hands. They do, and Tinker Bell is saved. Peter grabs his dagger and heads off to rescue Wendy and the Boys.

=== Act III ===
The Jolly Roger

Hook revels in his success ("Hook's Waltz"). As the plank is prepared, Hook hears the tick-tock of the crocodile and panics. It is actually Peter with a clock, and while Hook cowers Peter and the Boys help the Indians, the animals and Liza onto the ship and hide. Peter hides in a closet and kills two pirates Hook sends in. A third pirate, Starkey, refuses to obey Hook's order to go in and jumps overboard. The pirates then carry the Boys in, and the Boys pretend to be afraid as they are carried in. Peter disguises himself as a pirate, and the pirates think the "doodle-doo" (named so because Peter still crows after killing the pirates) killed all the Boys. Hook believes the ship is now cursed, and everyone thinks Wendy is the source. The pirates push Wendy to the plank. Peter ditches his disguise and the Indians and animals attack, as well as the Boys who are alive and armed. The pirates are all defeated, and Peter challenges Hook to a duel and defeats him. Hook threatens to blow up the ship with a bomb, but runs into the real crocodile (whom Peter also brought on the ship). Peter catches the dropped bomb and tosses it in the sea after Hook slides down the plank (which is shaped like a slide) with the crocodile chasing behind him. As Peter puts his fingers in his ears, the bomb explodes and Hook is eaten by the crocodile. Everyone sings Peter's praises ("Finale: I've Gotta Crow" [reprise]). Before the Darling children and the Lost Boys go to London, Liza asks Peter to teach her to crow ("Finale: I've Gotta Crow" [2nd reprise]).

Back home, the Darlings sit by the nursery window night after night, hoping for the return of their children. The children silently reappear and sing to their mother ("Tender Shepherd" [reprise]). The Darlings happily agree to adopt the Lost Boys ("Finale: We Will Grow Up"). Wendy promises to wait for Peter, hoping that one day he will return for her.

Years pass, and Peter returns to the nursery, surprising a much older Wendy, who no longer expected him. He has come to take her to Neverland for Spring cleaning, but she declines as she is now grown up; married with a daughter of her own, Jane. Peter starts to cry, and Wendy leaves the room at the sound of her husband's offstage voice. Jane awakes and, like her mother before her, asks, "Boy, why are you crying?" Peter introduces himself, but Jane knows all about him from her mother's stories. She has been waiting for him to come take her to Neverland and to learn to fly. Peter, now happy again, throws fairy dust on her, but as they are about to leave, Wendy tries to stop them, saying, "Oh, if only I could go with you!" In the most poignant moment of the show, Peter answers with a sad but understanding smile, "You can't. You see, Wendy ... you're too grown up" and so Wendy reluctantly lets Jane go, "just for Spring cleaning." Her daughter and the "boy who wouldn't grow up" fly off into the night as Wendy watches from the window. ("Finale: Never Never Land [Reprise]")

== Musical numbers ==
Original Broadway production

Title	Sung by	Music	Lyrics
Act I			
"Tender Shepherd"	Wendy, John, Michael, and Mrs. Darling	Moose Charlap	Carolyn Leigh
"I've Gotta Crow"	Peter Pan	Moose Charlap	Carolyn Leigh
"Never Never Land"	Peter Pan	Jule Styne	Comden and Green
"I'm Flying"	Peter Pan, Wendy, John, Michael	Moose Charlap	Carolyn Leigh
Act II			
"Pirate March"	Captain Hook and Pirates	Moose Charlap	Carolyn Leigh
"Hook's Tango"	Captain Hook and Pirates	Moose Charlap	Carolyn Leigh
"Indians!"	Tiger Lily and Indians	Moose Charlap	Moose Charlap
"Wendy"	Peter Pan and Lost Boys	Jule Styne	Comden and Green
"Hook's Tarantella"	Captain Hook and Pirates	Moose Charlap	Carolyn Leigh
"Neverland Waltz" (instrumental reprise, no vocal) (cut on TV showings after 1973)	Danced by Liza and the Animals	Jule Styne arranged by Trude Rittman	
"I Won't Grow Up"	Peter Pan, Slightly, Curly, Twins and Lost Boys	Moose Charlap	Carolyn Leigh
"Oh, My Mysterious Lady"	Peter Pan and Captain Hook	Jule Styne	Comden and Green
"Ugg-a-Wugg"	Peter Pan, Tiger Lily, Children and Indians	Jule Styne	Comden and Green
"Distant Melody"	Peter Pan	Jule Styne	Comden and Green
Act III			
"Hook's Waltz"	Captain Hook and Pirates	Jule Styne	Comden and Green
"I've Gotta Crow" (reprise)	Peter Pan, Company	Moose Charlap	Carolyn Leigh
"Tender Shepherd" (reprise)	Wendy, John and Michael	Moose Charlap	Carolyn Leigh
"We Will Grow Up" (a reprise of "I Won't Grow Up")	The Darling Family, Lost Boys	Moose Charlap	Carolyn Leigh
"Never Never Land" (reprise)	Peter Pan	Jule Styne	Comden and Green

== Roles ==
- Peter Pan: Usually played by a woman in the musical but can be played by a boy, too.
- Tinker Bell: a fairy and Peter Pan's best friend, represented only by a tiny flashing white light. Her "dialogue" is heard as tinkling music played by a celesta in the orchestra. Other characters "translate" what she "says".

The Darling family

- Wendy Moira Angela Darling: the eldest of the Darling children
- John Napoleon Darling: Wendy's younger brother.
- Michael Nicholas Darling: Wendy's youngest brother.
- Mr. George Darling: the father of the Darling family.
- Mrs. Mary Darling: the mother of the Darlings.
- Nana: the dog/nurse, usually played by a person in costume (along with all the other animals).
- Liza: the family maid. In the published version of the stage play from 1928, Liza is only used at the end of Act I and the beginning of Act V Scene II, however in the separate performance version used in English theaters from 1904-1960s, Liza featured far more heavily in various pantomime moments with the audience, possibly to aid with scene transitions. The Mary Martin musical, which was chiefly based on this performance version, rather than the published version, included more scenes utilizing Liza. Later versions, including the Cathy Rigby revival, removed many of Liza's appearances to bring the text more in line with the published version of the play.
- Jane: Wendy's daughter.

The Lost Boys

- Slightly Soiled: The most conceited of the Lost Boys. Appointed Leader at the end of Act II.
- Tootles: The humblest of the boys because he always misses out on the adventures. He is most often portrayed as the youngest of the boys.
- The Twins: The twins do and act as one because Peter does not understand twins. They are usually portrayed as identical, though some productions purposefully cast very different looking people.
- Curly
- Nibs: The 'gay and debonair.' He is the first to sight the Wendy Bird at the start of Act II.

The Indians

- Tiger Lily: The princess of the Henny Penny tribe. In the original stage play and novel she is the princess of the Piccaninny Tribe, however by the time of the musical's production this was censored.
- Great Big Little Panther
- Lean Wolf

The Pirates

- Captain James Hook: Peter's nemesis, usually played by the same actor who plays Mr. Darling.
- Smee: The Boatswain of the Jolly Roger. He serves as a comedic foil to Hook.
- Starkey: The Pirate featured in the Marooners' Rock scene. This scene was removed from the original Mary Martin run of the show but was added back in various productions, including the Cathy Rigby run.
- Bill Jukes
- Cecco
- Noodler
- Mullins
- Cookson
- Skylights
- Alf Mason
- Alsatian Fogarty
- Albino
- Quang Lee
- Bollard and Giant Pirate

The Animals of the Neverland

- Ostrich: Opens Act II, dancing with Slightly. This role, along with all the other animal roles, does not speak.
- Lion: This role, along with the ostrich, is often removed in modern productions.
- Crocodile: The only thing, besides his blood, that Hook fears. It swallowed a clock, which gives Hook ample time to escape.

== Awards and nominations ==
=== Original Broadway production ===
Year	Award	Category	Nominee	Result
1955	Tony Award	Best Performance by a Leading Actress in a Musical	Mary Martin	Won
1955	Tony Award	Best Performance by a Featured Actor in a Musical	Cyril Ritchard	Won
1955	Tony Award	Best Stage Technician	Richard Rodda	Won

=== 1979 Broadway revival ===
Year	Award	Category	Nominee	Result
1980	Tony Award	Best Revival		Nominated
1980	Tony Award	Best Performance by a Leading Actress in a Musical	Sandy Duncan	Nominated
1980	Drama Desk Award	Outstanding Actress in a Musical	Sandy Duncan	Nominated

=== 1990 Broadway revival ===
Year	Award	Category	Nominee	Result
1991	Tony Award	Best Revival		Nominated
1991	Tony Award	Best Performance by a Leading Actress in a Musical	Cathy Rigby	Nominated

=== 1998 Broadway revival ===
Year	Award	Category	Nominee	Result
1999	Tony Award	Best Revival of a Musical		Nominated

== See also ==
- Peter Pan Live!
