= Music in My Heart =

- Directed by: Joseph Santley
- Written by: James Edward Grant
- Produced by: Irving Starr
- Starring: Tony Martin; Rita Hayworth; Edith Fellows; Alan Mowbray
- Cinematography: John Stumar
- Edited by: Otto Meyer
- Music by: Chet Forrest; Bob Wright; Ary Barroso; Charles Henderson (vocal arranger); Morris Stoloff (musical director)
- Distributed by: Columbia Pictures
- Release date: January 10, 1940
- Running time: 70 minutes
- Country: United States
- Language: English

Music in My Heart is a 1940 Columbia Pictures romantic musical starring Tony Martin and Rita Hayworth. Hayworth's first musical for the studio, the film was recognized with an Academy Award nomination for the song, "It's a Blue World", performed by Martin and Andre Kostelanetz and His Orchestra.

== Cast ==
Credits for Music in My Heart are listed in the AFI Catalog of Feature Films.

- Tony Martin as Robert Gregory
- Rita Hayworth as Patricia O'Malley
- Edith Fellows as Mary
- Alan Mowbray as Charles Gardner
- Eric Blore as Griggs
- George Tobias as Sascha
- Joseph Crehan as Mark C. Gilman
- George Humbert as Luigi
- Joey Ray as Miller
- Don Brodie as Taxi Driver
- Julieta Novis as Leading Lady
- Eddie Kane as Blake
- Phil Tead as Marshall
- Marten Lamont as Barrett
- Andre Kostelanetz and His Orchestra

== Production ==
Production on Music in My Heart (alternate title Passport to Happiness) began in October 1939. The film was released January 10, 1940.

== Soundtrack ==
Chet Forrest and Bob Wright's original songs for Music in My Heart include "Oh What a Lovely Dream", "Punchinello", "I've Got Music in My Heart", "It's a Blue World" (a hit record for Tony Martin), "No Other Love" and "Hearts in the Sky". The film also features Ary Barroso's samba, "No Tabuleiro da Baiana", performed by Andre Kostelanetz and His Orchestra.

== Accolades ==
"It's a Blue World", a song by Chet Forrest and Bob Wright, was nominated as Best Original Song at the 13th Academy Awards. The song is performed in the film by Tony Martin and Andre Kostelanetz and His Orchestra.

== Reception ==
Film historian Clive Hirschhorn describes Music in My Heart as "a lightweight Irving Starr production" with "serviceable words and music" and "unremarkable direction".

Biographer Barbara Leaming characterized the film as one of the "dreadful mistakes" Columbia Pictures made with Rita Hayworth as the studio tried to figure out how to use her to advantage. Music in My Heart was one of five pictures Hayworth appeared in that year, none of which caught on with the public.

Reviewing the 2004 DVD release, Turner Classic Movies called Music in My Heart "a fun, charming, and unpretentious little musical which illustrates very well what an ordinary Hollywood entertainment of 1940 was like. … In the end, it's Martin's voice and Hayworth's overall presence which makes this a nice little winner, though Eric Blore, Alan Mowbray and George Tobias provide solid support as always."

== Home media ==
- 2004: Columbia TriStar Home Entertainment, DVD. ISBN 9781404955332
