= Amanda Waring =

Singer, actress, comedian and campaigner

- Born: London, England
- Education: Guildhall School of Music and Drama
- Occupations: actor, comedian, activist
- Parent(s): Dorothy Tutin and Derek Waring
- Website: https://www.amandawaring.com/

Amanda Waring (born Amanda Barton-Chapple) is an English singer, actress, comedian and activist for dignity within health and social care. She played the title role in the 1985 West End production of Gigi, and is also known for roles in Outside Edge and All Creatures Great and Small.

== Early life ==
Waring was born in London to parents Dorothy Tutin and Derek Waring, both famous actors. As a child, she wanted to be a vet or an actress.

== Career ==
Waring trained at the Guildhall School of Music and Drama. She was cast in the title role of the 1985 West End production of Gigi at the age of 19, and was a featured performer at the 1985 Royal Variety Performance.

In 2003, Waring planned an Edinburgh Fringe Festival show based on Joanne Harris' Chocolat, but following a late cease and desist communication from Disney, she reworked it into a more generic chocolate-themed show. It was titled For the Love of Chocolate.

== Activism ==
Inspired by the care received by her mother at the end of her life in 2001, Waring became an activist and researcher for dignity in end-of-life care. She established the Dignity in Care campaign with the Government, which has over 180,000 dignity champions and launched "Dignity Matters" with the National Council for Palliative Care.

Waring wrote and directed the 2005 short film What Do You See?, starring Virginia McKenna OBE, on the topic. She aims to “remove this culture of fear people have about getting older and look at ways to celebrate, include, share with and honour our elders”.

Warning has written the book The Carer's Bible, which was launched in 2018 during National Carer's Week at The New Deanery and St Mary's Court care homes. Her other publications include Being A Good Carer: An Invaluable Guide to Looking After Others – And Yourself and The Heart of Care: Dignity in Action-A Guide to Person-centred Compassionate Elder Care.

== Screen credits ==
- Outside Edge
- All Creatures Great and Small
- Casualty
- The Princess and the Pea
