= Gigi (musical) =

Musical

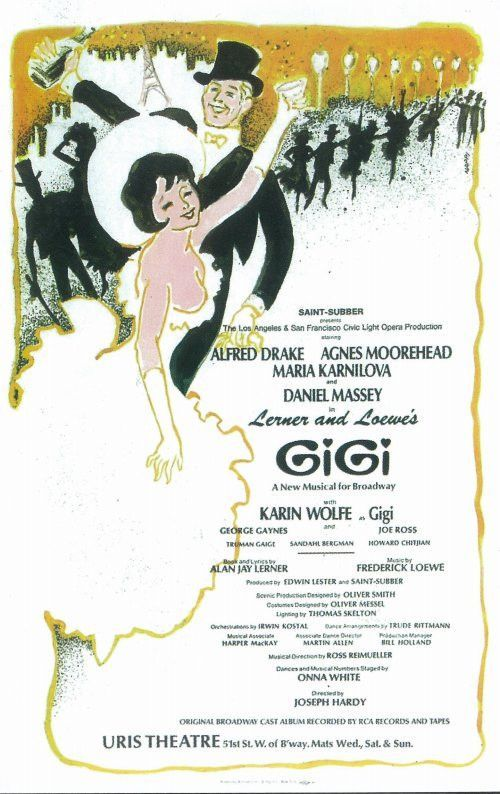
- Original Broadway Poster
- Music: Frederick Loewe
- Lyrics: Alan Jay Lerner
- Book: Alan Jay Lerner (original book); Heidi Thomas (revised book)
- Basis: Novel by Colette
- Premiere: May 15, 1973: Curran Theatre, San Francisco
- Productions: 1973 Broadway; 1984 National Tour; 1985 West End; 2015 Kennedy Center; 2015 Broadway Revival
- Awards: Tony Award for Best Score

Gigi is a musical with a book and lyrics by Alan Jay Lerner and music by Frederick Loewe. It is based on the 1944 novella Gigi by Colette and 1958 hit musical film of the same name. The story concerns Gigi, a free-spirited teenaged girl living in Paris at the turn of the 20th century. She is being groomed as a courtesan in her family's tradition. Before she is deemed ready for her social debut, she encounters the bon vivant bachelor Gaston Lachaille, whom she captivates as she is transformed into a charmingly poised young lady.

The original Broadway production, produced by Edwin Lester in 1973, ran for a disappointing 103 performances but won the Tony Award for Best Score. A West End production played in 1985.

A new production of the musical starring Vanessa Hudgens, adapted by Heidi Thomas and directed by Eric D. Schaeffer, premiered at the Kennedy Center (Washington, DC) in January 2015, and ran on Broadway from April 8 to June 21, 2015 at the Neil Simon Theatre.

== Background ==
Gigi originated as a 1945 novella by Colette, which was adapted for the screen with Danièle Delorme in 1948. In 1951 Anita Loos adapted the novel for the stage, and the Broadway production of Gigi starred Audrey Hepburn in her first major role.

Seven years later, while My Fair Lady was in Philadelphia prior to its Broadway opening, Arthur Freed approached Lerner about a feature film musical adaptation. Although Loewe had vowed never to work in movies, he was charmed by the book and agreed to collaborate on the project. The 1958 film of Gigi proved to be a major critical and commercial success and the winner of nine Academy Awards, including Best Picture.

== Productions ==
=== Original productions ===
Edwin Lester, founder of the Los Angeles Civic Light Opera, asked for a stage version of the film Gigi, and Lerner and Loewe then wrote the stage musical. They added four songs and a ballet for the stage adaptation. Gigi premiered at the Curran Theatre, San Francisco, on May 15, 1973, and then embarked on a six-month tour.

The musical opened on Broadway on November 13, 1973 at the Uris Theatre, where it ran for 103 performances and seven previews. Directed by Joseph Hardy and choreographed by Onna White, the cast featured Karin Wolfe as Gigi, Daniel Massey as Gaston, Maria Karnilova as Mamita, Agnes Moorehead as Aunt Alicia, and Alfred Drake as Honoré. Arlene Francis replaced the ailing Moorehead later in the run (Moorehead died of cancer on April 30, 1974). An original cast recording was released by RCA Victor. Louis Jourdan starred in a production that toured the United States in the mid 1980s, not in his original role as Gaston, but rather as Honoré.

The West End production opened on 17 September 1985 at the Lyric Theatre, where it ran for seven months. The cast included Amanda Waring as Gigi and Geoffrey Burridge as Gaston, with Beryl Reid as Mamita, Siân Phillips as Aunt Alicia, and Jean-Pierre Aumont as Honoré.

A London cast album was released by First Night Records.

=== Revival productions ===
A production of the musical, newly adapted by Heidi Thomas, directed by Eric D. Schaeffer, and with choreography by Josh Bergasse, opened at the Kennedy Center's Eisenhower Theatre, from January 16, 2015 to February 12, 2015. Vanessa Hudgens played the role of Gigi.

On January 14, 2015, it was announced that the Kennedy Center production of Gigi would transfer to Broadway with a cast led by Vanessa Hudgens. The production began previews on March 19, 2015 at the Neil Simon Theatre and officially opened on April 8. It closed on June 21, 2015. The Show was lead produced by Jenna Segal with scenic design by Derek McLane, costume design by Catherine Zuber, lighting design by Natasha Katz, and sound design by Kai Harada. A national tour was also scheduled in the 2016–2017 season but was not produced, and was available for licensing from Tams-Witmark Music Library.

A Broadway cast album, produced and engineered by six-time Grammy winner Frank Filipetti, was released by DMI Records in June 2015.

== Synopsis ==
Honoré Lachaille explains that in turn-of-the-20th-century Paris, marriage is not the only option. His nephew Gaston is a rich bon vivant, much like his uncle. But Gaston is bored with the high life and his series of mistresses. The one thing he truly enjoys is spending time with an old friend of his uncle, Madame Alvarez, whom he calls Mamita, and especially her granddaughter, the precocious, carefree Gilberte or "Gigi". Gaston's Uncle Honoré was involved romantically with Mamita, although advancing age has confused their recollections of the past.

Madame Alvarez sends Gigi to her Aunt Alicia's to learn to be a high-society courtesan in their family's tradition. Gigi is initially a very poor student, as she does not understand the reasons behind her education and finds Parisians' obsession with making love inexplicable. She does, however, enjoy spending time with Gaston, whom she treats as an older brother. Alicia is unhappy to discover that Gaston took Gigi and Madame Alvarez on holiday, as her sister had not consulted her. She insists that Gigi's education must increase dramatically if she is to catch a prize such as Gaston. Mamita is shocked, but sees the advantages it could bring Gigi and so goes along with the plan - though neither tells Gigi of their scheming. Gigi is miserable in her lessons, but puts up with them as a necessary evil, though she still seems awkward and bumbling to her perfectionist aunt.

Gaston visits and is shocked to see Gigi in an alluring white gown. He tells her she looks ridiculous and storms out, but returns later and apologizes, offering to make it up by taking her to dinner. Mamita refuses, telling Gaston that, with his reputation, a young girl seen in his company might be labelled in such a way as could damage her future. Gaston is enraged again, storms out, and wanders the streets of Paris in a fury.

Gaston realises that he has fallen in love with Gigi. He returns to Mamita and strikes a business arrangement to take Gigi as his mistress, promising to provide the girl with luxury and kindness. He visits Gigi later, but she tells him she does not wish to become someone's mistress; she wants more for herself than to be passed between men, only desired until they grow tired of her and she is moved on to another. Gaston is horrified at this portrayal of the life he wishes to give her, and leaves stunned. Later, however, Gigi contacts him; when Gaston returns, Gigi says she would "rather be miserable with [him] than without [him]."

Later that night Gigi emerges from her room prepared to accept her fate and take up her role as Gaston's mistress. For the first time, she appears as a woman, not a young girl. Gaston is enchanted when he picks Gigi up to take her to dinner at Maxim's, a popular Paris restaurant. Gigi's awkwardness is gone and she seems perfectly at ease. Nevertheless, patrons' stares make Gaston uncomfortable as he realises Gigi's interpretation of things may have been accurate after all. He discovers that his love for her makes the idea of her as his mistress an unbearable one. Angered by Honoré's comments, Gaston leaves the party with Gigi in tow, taking her home without explanation. A weeping Gigi begs to know what she has done to offend him, but Gaston does not answer until he arrives at Mamita's and humbly asks for Gigi's hand in marriage.

== Songs ==
Act I

- Overture
- Thank Heaven for Little Girls - Honoré
- It's A Bore - Honoré and Gaston
- The Earth and Other Minor Things - Gigi
- Paris is Paris Again - Honoré and Ensemble
- She's Not Thinking of Me - Gaston
- It's A Bore (Reprise) - Honoré, Gaston, Manuel and Aunt Alicia
- The Night They Invented Champagne - Gigi, Gaston and Mamita
- I Remember It Well - Honoré and Mamita
- I Never Want To Go Home Again - Gigi and Ensemble

Act II

- Gigi - Gaston
- The Contract - Alicia, Mamita, Duclos and Du Fresne
- I'm Glad I'm Not Young Anymore - Honoré
- In This Wide, Wide World - Gigi
- Thank Heaven for Little Girls (reprise) - Honoré

== Casting ==
Role	Original Broadway Cast (1973)	National Tour Cast (1984)	Original London Cast (1985)	Broadway Revival Cast (2015)
Gigi	Karin Wolfe	Lisa Howard	Amanda Waring	Vanessa Hudgens
Gaston Lachaille	Daniel Massey	Tom Hewitt	Geoffrey Burridge	Corey Cott
Honoré Lachaille	Alfred Drake	Louis Jourdan	Jean-Pierre Aumont	Howard McGillin
Inez Alvarez (Mamita)	Maria Karnilova	Taina Elg	Beryl Reid	Victoria Clark
Aunt Alicia	Agnes Moorehead	Betsy Palmer	Siân Phillips	Dee Hoty
Liane d'Exelmans	Sandahl Bergman	Carla Farnsworth-Webb	Carrie Ellis	Steffanie Leigh
Manuel	Truman Gaige	Geoffrey Webb	John Aron	-
Maitre Dufresne	Richard Woods	Joe Gustern	John Aron	James Patterson
Sandomir	Randy Di Grazio	-	-	Amos Wolf
Maitre Duclos	Howard Chitjian	Rob Donohoe	David De Van	-

== Awards and nominations ==
=== Original Broadway production ===
Year	Award Ceremony	Category	Nominee	Result
1974	Tony Awards	Best Original Score	Music by Frederick Loewe; Lyrics by Alan Jay Lerner	Won
1974	Tony Awards	Best Leading Actor in a Musical	Alfred Drake	Nominated
1974	Tony Awards	Best Scenic Design	Oliver Smith	Nominated
1974	Tony Awards	Best Costume Design	Oliver Messel	Nominated

=== 2015 Broadway revival ===
Year	Award Ceremony	Category	Nominee	Result
2015	Tony Awards	Best Featured Actress in a Musical	Victoria Clark	Nominated
2015	Drama Desk Awards	Outstanding Costume Design	Catherine Zuber	Won
2015	Outer Critics Circle Awards	Outstanding Featured Actress in a Musical	Victoria Clark	Nominated
