= Kean (musical) =

1961 musical

- Original Cast Recording
- Music: Robert Wright; George Forrest
- Lyrics: Robert Wright; George Forrest
- Book: Peter Stone
- Basis: Life of Edmund Kean
- Productions: 1961 Broadway production

Kean is a musical with a book by Peter Stone and music and lyrics by Robert Wright and George Forrest.

Using material by Jean-Paul Sartre and Alexandre Dumas, père as its source, it centers on the adventures of Edmund Kean, considered the greatest Shakespearean actor of the early 19th century, focusing primarily mainly on his wild behavior offstage. Trouble ensues as Kean desperately tries to juggle the two women in his life - the Danish Ambassador's wife, Elena, and a young aspiring actress, Anna.

After one preview, the Broadway production, directed and choreographed by Jack Cole, opened on November 2, 1961 at the Broadway Theatre, where it ran for 92 performances. The cast included Roderick Cook, Alfred Drake, Larry Fuller, Christopher Hewett, Joan Weldon, and Lee Venora.

Drake was nominated for the Tony Award for Best Actor in a Musical, and the show was nominated for Best Conductor and Musical Director.

An original cast recording was released by Columbia Records. This album is one of the most valuable original cast albums because of its scarcity.

== Song list ==
Act I

- Penny Plain, Tuppence Colored
- Man and Shadow
- Mayfair Affair
- Sweet Danger
- Queue at Drury Lane
- King of London
- To Look Upon My Love
- Let's Improvise
- Elena
- Social Whirl
- The Fog and the Grog

Act II

- Civilized People
- Service for Service
- Willow, Willow, Willow
- Fracas at Old Drury
- Chime In
- Swept Away
- Domesticity
- Clown of London
- Apology?
