= Francia White =

American opera singer

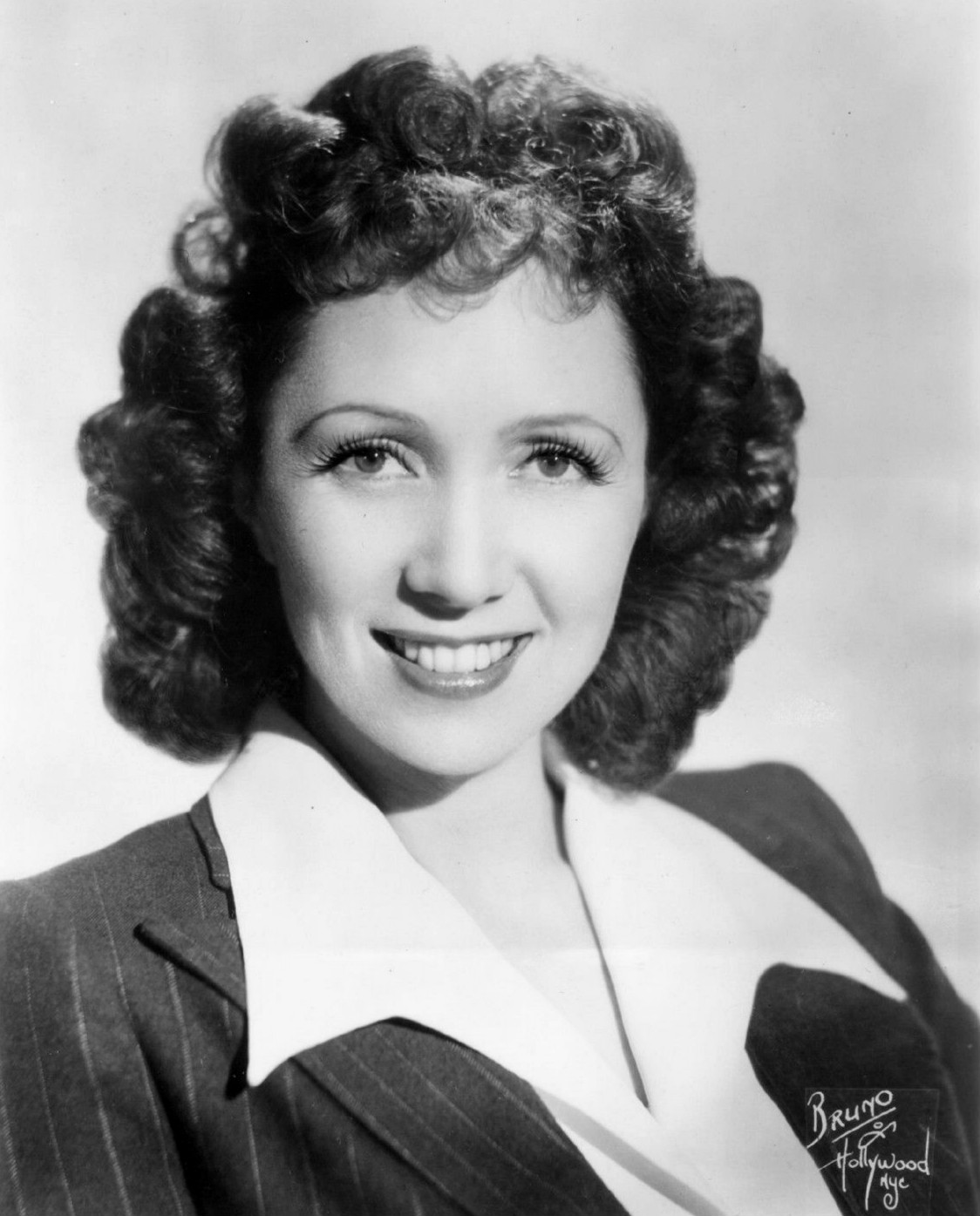
Francia White

Francia White (1909 - October 22, 1984) was an American soprano who had an active career in concerts, operas, operettas, radio, television, and film during the late 1920s through the 1940s. She began her career as a vaudeville performer in her late teens and then began singing in more serious classical music repertoire during the mid-1930s. She drew the attention of Hollywood and began working as a ghost singer for films in 1934. She soon broke into radio in 1935 and was highly active in that medium until 1941. On television she starred on the musical variety show, The Bell Telephone Hour, from 1940-1942. In addition to her radio work, she is chiefly remembered for helping to launch Edwin Lester's Los Angeles Civic Light Opera in 1938 and was one of their main leading ladies up through 1942.

== Biography ==
Born in Greenville, Texas, White's family moved to the San Gabriel Valley in California when she was nine. She attended Covina High School during which time she began studying voice under Louis Graveure. With Graveure's encouragement she became a vaudeville performer after high school. She eventually entered Occidental College in 1930 where she was a voice major for a year, but then dropped out to work in vaudeville again in 1931.

After three years touring in vaudeville shows, White became the headlining performer at Grauman's Chinese Theatre in 1934. Her work drew the attention of 20th Century Fox and she was soon working as a ghost singer for Hollywood films during the 1930s. Her first film was The Mighty Barnum, singing the role of Jenny Lind for Virginia Bruce. Her work as a ghost singer caught the ears of a radio executive at NBC Radio City Studios (located at the radio station at the Radio City Music Hall in New York City). She was offered a contract in 1935 and sang regularly for fifteen months on a few different radio programs with the company. She then became a regular performer with Nelson Eddy on The Voice of Firestone in 1936 and The Chase and Sanborn Hour in 1938. She was also a regular featured performer on The Ford Sunday Evening Hour. In 1939 she had her own musical variety program on WFAN with James Melton. She and Melton were later the first hosts/featured performers of the television program The Bell Telephone Hour during the early 1940s.

White also sang in operas and more serious concert repertoire at the Hollywood Bowl during the 1930s. She became a regular performer at the Los Angeles Civic Light Opera during the late 1930s and early 1940s, notably starring in the company's very first production as Mitzi in Franz Schubert's Blossom Time in 1938. Other LACLO roles included Marianne Beaunoir in Sigmund Romberg's The New Moon (1938), Princess Helene in Oscar Straus's Waltz Dream (1939), the title heroine in Victor Herbert's Naughty Marietta (1941), and Nina in Rudolf Friml's The Firefly (1942).

White's career was tragically struck short in 1943 when she developed a severe case of rheumatoid arthritis that forced her to retire. She battled the disease for the rest of the life. She died in 1984 in Los Angeles County, California.
