= When the Lights Go On Again (film) =

1944 American drama film

When the Lights Go on Again
- Theatrical release poster
- Directed by: William K. Howard
- Screenplay by: Milton Lazarus
- Story by: Frank Craven
- Produced by: Leon Fromkess
- Starring: Jimmy Lydon; Barbara Belden; Regis Toomey; George Cleveland; Grant Mitchell; Dorothy Peterson
- Cinematography: Ira H. Morgan
- Edited by: W. Donn Hayes
- Music by: W. Franke Harling
- Production company: Producers Releasing Corporation
- Distributed by: Producers Releasing Corporation
- Release date: October 23, 1944
- Running time: 74 minutes
- Country: United States
- Language: English

When the Lights Go on Again is a 1944 American drama film directed by William K. Howard and written by Milton Lazarus. The film stars Jimmy Lydon, Barbara Belden, Regis Toomey, George Cleveland, Grant Mitchell and Dorothy Peterson. The film was released on October 23, 1944, by Producers Releasing Corporation.

== Cast ==
- Jimmy Lydon as Ted Benson
- Barbara Belden as Arline Cary
- Regis Toomey as Bill Regan
- George Cleveland as Pat 'Gramps' Benson
- Grant Mitchell as Arnold Benson
- Dorothy Peterson as Clara Benson
- Harry Shannon as Tom Cary
- Lucien Littlefield as Andy
- Joseph Crehan as Bob
- Luis Alberni as Joe
- Warren Mills as Joey Benson
- Emmett Lynn as Tramp
- Jill Browning as Peggy
