= Irra Petina =

American opera singer

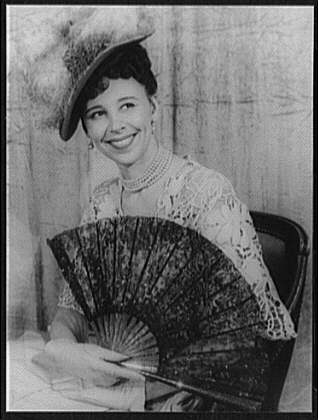
Irra Petina photo taken by Carl Van Vechten, 1948

Irra Petina (April 18, 1908 – January 19, 2000), born Irina Stepanovna Petina, was an actress and singer as well as a leading contralto with the Metropolitan Opera in New York City. She was called the "floperetta queen" by critic Ken Mandelbaum.

Born in St. Petersburg, Russia, Petina was the daughter of General Stepan Petin, Czar Nicholas II's personal escort, and a goddaughter of the Dowager Empress Marie Feodorovna. She studied singing in New York City with Estelle Liebling, the teacher of Beverly Sills. Her debut role with the Met was as Schwertleite in Richard Wagner's Die Walküre (the second part of the acclaimed Ring Cycle) on December 29, 1933. She appeared as Maddalena in Giuseppe Verdi's Rigoletto with Jan Peerce, the marquise of Berkenfeld in Donizetti's The Daughter of the Regiment with Lily Pons, Mallika in Léo Delibes's Lakmé, Feodor in Boris Godunov, Annina in Richard Strauss's Der Rosenkavalier, and the title role in Bizet's Carmen.

Petina's portrayal of Marcellina in Wolfgang Amadeus Mozart's Le nozze di Figaro (27 Met performances in all, with four radio broadcasts), won her rave reviews from the New York Times and the New York Herald Tribune. Additional credits include 35 Met performances as Berta in Rossini's The Barber of Seville, and despite being a contralto, the central soprano role of Rosalinde in a 1944 national tour of Johann Strauss, Jr.'s operetta Die Fledermaus.

Petina also appeared on Broadway in productions such as Song of Norway (1947), Magdalena (1948), Hit the Trail (1954), Leonard Bernstein's Candide (1957), for which she received a Tony Award nomination as Best Featured Actress in a Musical, and Anya (1965).

Petina appeared as herself in Andrew L. Stone's film There's Magic in Music (1941).

Asked how to pronounce her name, she told The Literary Digest the first syllable should be stressed: PEH-ti-na. (Charles Earle Funk, What's the Name, Please?, Funk & Wagnalls, 1936.)

She married Dr. Frank Bussey and died in Austin, Texas. Her archive is held at the Harry Ransom Center at the University of Texas at Austin.
