= Edwin Lester =

American theatre director, impresario, & producer (1895-1990)

- Born: 30 March 1895; New York City, New York
- Died: 13 December 1990 (aged 95); Beverly Hills, California
- Occupation: Theatre impresario
- Known for: Founder and director of Los Angeles Civic Light Opera

Edwin Lester (30 March 1895 – 13 December 1990) was an American theatre director, impresario, and producer.

He was the longtime general director of the Los Angeles Civic Light Opera, which he founded in 1938. He also co-founded the LACLO's affiliate organization, the San Francisco Civic Light Opera, with Homer Curran in 1939. Under his leadership, the LACLO produced or co-produced several of their own shows, a number of which went on to wider success, including Song of Norway (1944), Magdalena (1948), Kismet (1953), Peter Pan (1954) and Gigi (1973). Lester also brought in shows from Broadway to California, often with their original casts.

== Biography ==
Lester was born in New York City, and worked professionally as a singer during his childhood and then had a brief career as a concert pianist. He moved to California to work for Sid Grauman at the Chinese Theater in Hollywood where he staged spectacle prologues in the late 1920s. In the early 1930s he worked as a talent manager for performers.

In 1938 Lester founded the Los Angeles Civic Light Opera under the motto "Light Opera in the Grand Opera manner". The company opened its first season in 1938 with Franz Schubert's operetta Blossom Time, presented in English with stars John Charles Thomas and Francia White. The production was both a critical and financial success, and the company went on to have three more sold out productions that season with Sigmund Romberg's The Student Prince, Romberg's The New Moon, and Jerome Kern's Roberta.

While including touring productions from NYC in their annual season, the LACLO still continued to mount their own locally produced productions under the artistic leadership of Lester. One major triumph for the company was the 1944 operetta Song of Norway which Lester commissioned Milton Lazarus, Robert Wright, and George Forrest to create using the music of Edvard Grieg. The production later went on to have a successful Broadway run. Wright and Forrest created several more original works for the LACLO, most notably the 1953 musical Kismet, which had an even greater success in New York. Perhaps the most successful original work to be produced at the LACLO was the 1954 musical version of Peter Pan which Lester orchestrated as a star vehicle for Mary Martin. After opening in Los Angeles, the production moved to Broadway, winning Martin a Tony Award. The LACLO also exported a number of revivals to Broadway during its history, including a 1945 revival of Victor Herbert's The Red Mill which ran for more than a year in New York.

Lester retired as general director and producer of the LACLO in 1976. He continued on as a member of the LACLO and SFLOC boards until closing of the companies. The SFLOC closed in 1980 and the LACLO closed in 1987. He died at the age of 95 at his home in Beverly Hills.
