= John Charles Thomas =

American opera singer

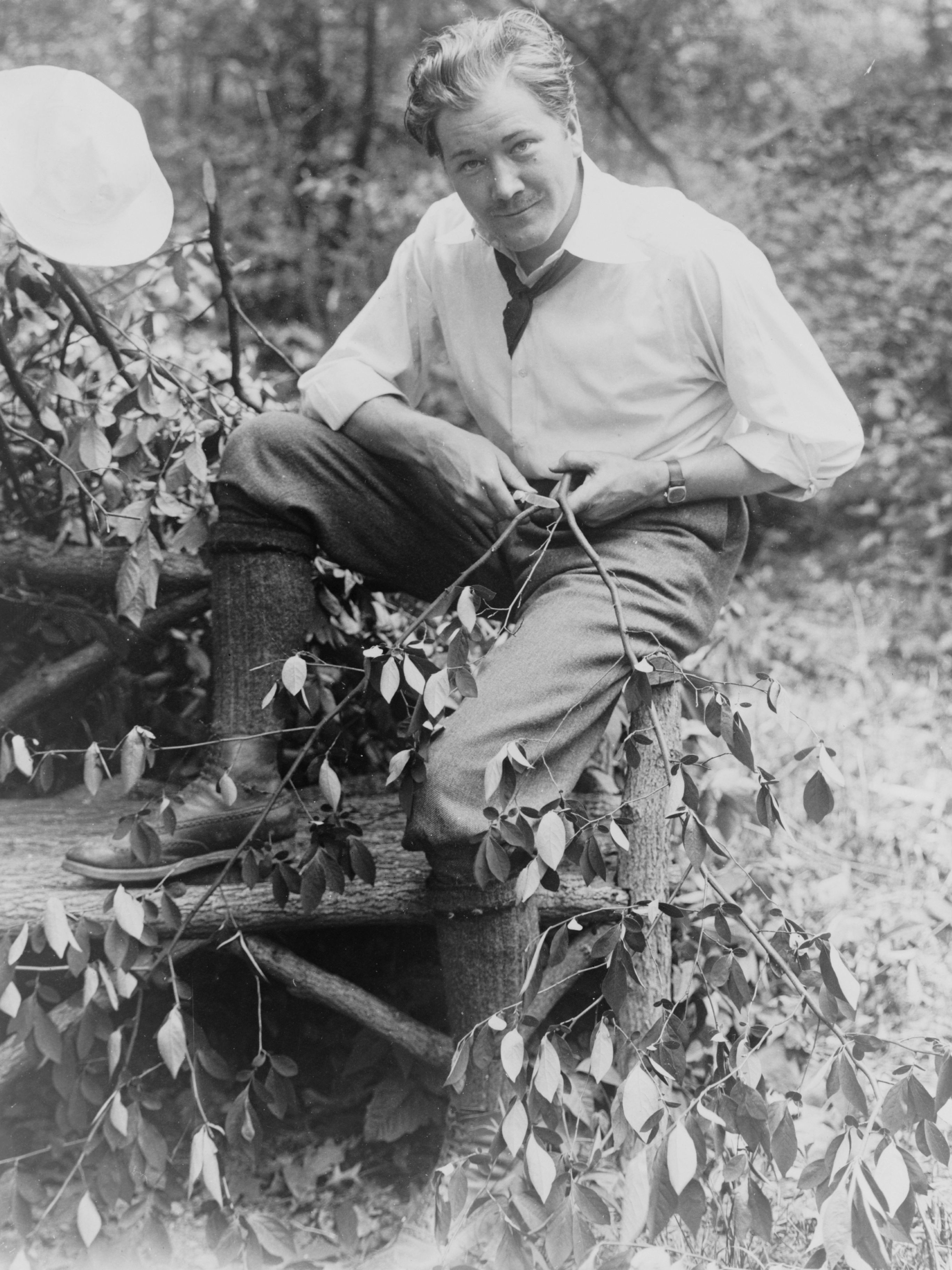
- John Charles Thomas, between 1915 and 1930.

Background information
- Born: September 6, 1891; Meyersdale, Pennsylvania
- Died: December 13, 1960 (aged 69) Apple Valley, California
- Genre: Opera
- Occupation: Singer
- Years active: 1912-1950
- Labels: Vocalion; RCA Victor; Brunswick

John Charles Thomas (September 6, 1891 – December 13, 1960) was an American opera, operetta and concert baritone.

== Biography ==
John Charles Thomas was born on September 6, 1891 in Meyersdale, Pennsylvania. His father was a Methodist minister of Welsh descent, while his mother - an amateur singer - was of German descent. After initially studying for a medical career, Thomas won a scholarship to the Peabody Institute in Baltimore in 1910. He remained there for two years, receiving vocal tuition from Adelin Fermin.

In 1912, Thomas left the Peabody and toured briefly with a musical troupe. He then moved to Manhattan, New York City, where he performed with a Gilbert and Sullivan operetta company before being contracted by the Shubert brothers to perform in the show The Peasant Girl, which opened in March 1913. For the next nine years, he starred in a series of hit Broadway musicals including Her Soldier Boy, Maytime, Naughty Marietta, and Apple Blossoms (with Fred and Adele Astaire).

== Operatic, recital and radio career ==
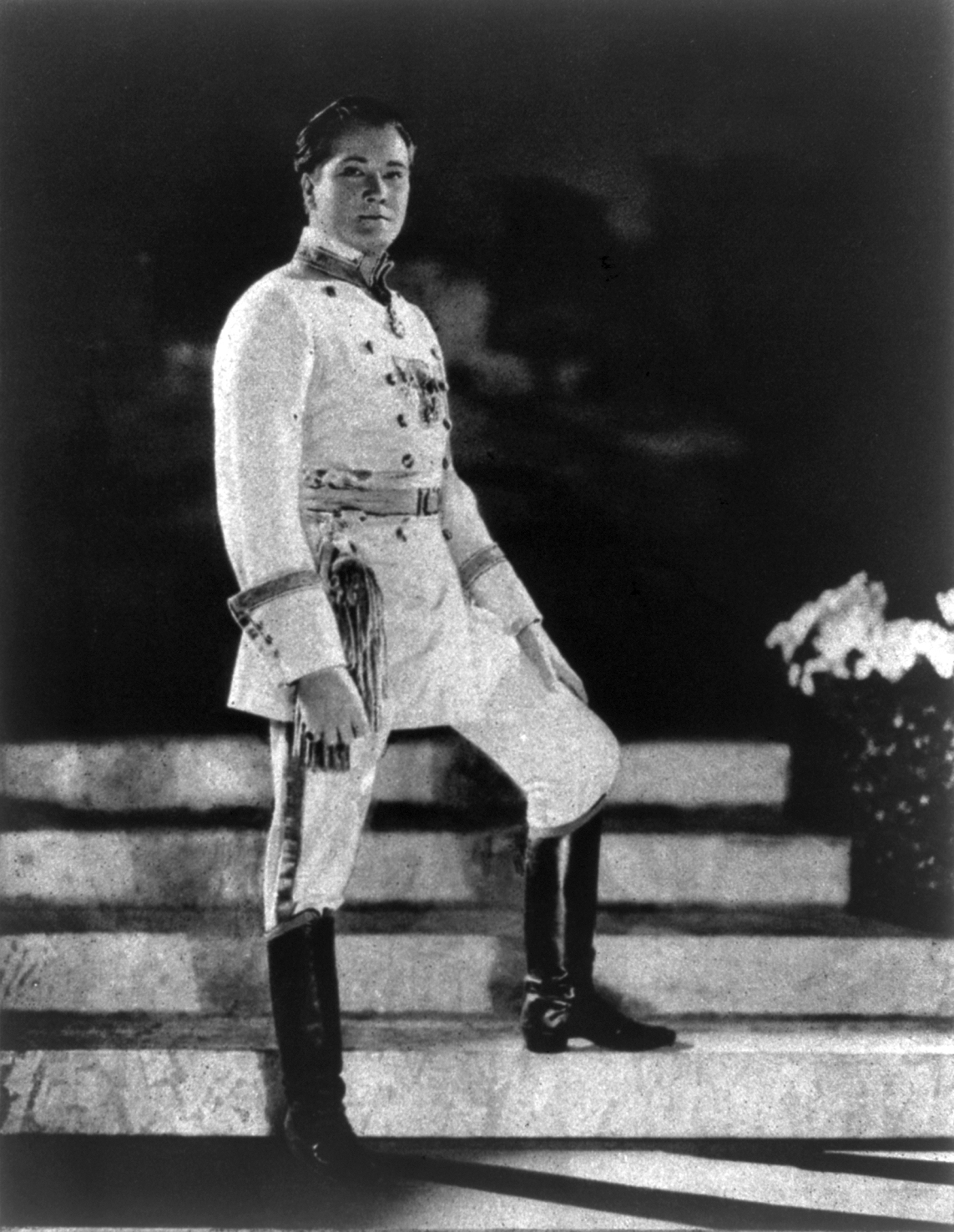
Thomas in costume, 1922

Thomas sang in a concert performance of the Market Scene from Rimsky-Korsakov's opera Sadko at Manhattan's Carnegie Hall in December 1924. His full opera debut came in March 1925, when he played Amonasro in a production of Verdi's Aida, presented by the semi-professional Washington National Opera.

Between 1922 and 1928, he spent part of each year in Europe, polishing his singing technique and appearing under contract at the La Monnaie opera house in Brussels for the 1925-27 seasons. He would return to La Monnaie for 25 more performances in 1928, eight in 1930 and four in 1931. He appeared with the famous Russian bass Feodor Chaliapin in productions of Faust at London's Royal Opera House in July 1928.

He continued to give recitals in the United States during this period and, in 1923, acted in the silent film Under the Red Robe, directed by Alan Crosland. He also made recordings for the Vocalion label (1920–24) and Brunswick Records (1924–29), before signing with RCA Victor in 1931. From 1929-32 he was a member of the Philadelphia Grand Opera Company and, in 1930, made one appearance with the Philadelphia Civic Opera Company. On December 9, 1930 he appeared in concert with The Highland Glee Club in Newton, Massachusetts.

He accepted engagements with the Washington National, San Francisco, Chicago and Philadelphia opera companies and, to satisfy a public demand, he was signed by the Metropolitan Opera in New York City in 1934. He would remain at the Met until 1943, performing opposite such stars as the soprano Rosa Ponselle.

During the Great Depression, he established himself as one of the most sought-after singers in America, with both a classical music following and a considerable popular audience. He also appeared regularly on commercial radio programs, including Five-Star Theater (in 1932-33 with the Joseph Bonime Orchestra), the Vince Radio Program (1934–36), The Magic Key of RCA (1937–40) and the Coca-Cola show (1940–41).

In 1938, he helped Edwin Lester launch the Los Angeles Civic Light Opera, appearing in the company's very first production, Blossom Time. This work was derived from a Viennese operetta Das Dreimäderlhaus, with music arranged from that of Schubert and adapted for American audiences by Dorothy Donnelly and Sigmund Romberg. Thomas sang regularly in operettas with the LACLO until 1942, starring in productions of The Gypsy Baron, H.M.S. Pinafore, The Chocolate Soldier and Music in the Air.

Thomas starred on the Westinghouse Radio Program from 1943-46, accompanied by the Victor Young Orchestra, and was among the founders of the Music Academy of the West summer conservatory in 1947.

From 1947 to 1948, Thomas undertook a long and demanding tour of Australia and New Zealand, where he played to crowded theatres. He gradually retired from the concert stage after 1950, and settled in Apple Valley, California in 1955 with his wife Dorothy.

== Death ==
Thomas died from cancer in Apple Valley in December 1960. His home there has been designated one of the town's historic sites.

== Opposition to rock-and-roll music ==
Thomas appeared twice as a contestant on the TV quiz program "You Bet Your Life", hosted by Groucho Marx. These episodes aired on 5 December 1957 and 12 December 1957. He strongly opposed rock-and-roll music during his first appearance, later debating the subject with advocate Roberta Rene during the second.

== Recordings ==
John Charles Thomas made many recordings throughout his life, many of which have since been released on CD. His commercial recordings include "Nemico della patria" from Andrea Chénier, "C’en est fait… Salomé demande" from Hérodiade, and the live broadcast recordings "Per me giunto" from Don Carlos, "Vien Leonora" from La favorite and "Il balen" from Il trovatore.

== Honors ==
- He was a National Patron of Delta Omicron, an international professional music fraternity.
- He was awarded a star on the Hollywood Walk of Fame on February 8, 1960.
- His rendering of the chorus of "Open Road, Open Sky" from "The Gypsy Baron" was chosen as soundtrack to the Audi TV ad campaign, 2011.
