= Homer Curran =

American theatrical producer (1885–1952)

Homer F. Curran (1885–1952) was an American theatrical producer on the West Coast of the United States during the first half of the 20th century. Born in Springfield, Missouri, he was educated at Stanford University. After graduating, he purchased and operated the Cort Theatre in San Francisco and temporarily changed its name to the Curran Theatre. In 1921, construction began on a new theatre which opened in 1922 as the Curran Theatre. This is the same theatre that operates under that name today. In 1939, he founded the San Francisco Light Opera Company which for many years worked in partnership with the Los Angeles Civic Light Opera. Throughout his years operating the Curran Theatre, he also established partnerships with the Shubert Organization as well as the Theatre Guild. He notably co-authored the books for the operetta Song of Norway and the musical Magdalena: a Musical Adventure.
