= Magdalena: a Musical Adventure =

Musical

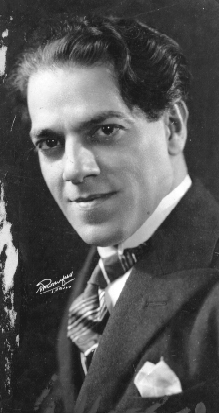
Heitor Villa-Lobos

Magdalena: a Musical Adventure is a folk operetta in two acts with music by Heitor Villa-Lobos, original book by Frederick Hazlitt Brennan and Homer Curran, and lyrics and musical adaptations by Robert Wright and George Forrest.

== Performance history ==
Magdalena premiered at the Los Angeles Civic Light Opera on 26 July 1948, pursuant to a commission from Edwin Lester, president of that organization. Arthur Kay conducted Irra Petina, Dorothy Sarnoff, John Raitt, Hugo Haas, Gerhard Pechner, A. Garcia, Melva Niles, Henry Reese, Ferdinand Hilt, J. Arthur, Betty Huff, Christine Matsios, Leonard Morganthaler, John Schickling, Lorraine Miller, Gene Curtsinger, Patrick Kirk, Betty Brusher, and Jack Cole (soloists). Jules Dassin directed, Jack Cole was the choreographer, assisted by Gwen Verdon, and the chorus was prepared by Robert Zeller. Broadway veterans Howard Bay (settings and lighting) and Irene Sharaff (costumes) were also part of the creative team. It was also presented in San Francisco at the Curran Theatre (San Francisco Light Opera) for several performances beginning August 16, 1948. The same production opened in New York City at the Ziegfeld Theatre on September 20, 1948 with Raitt, Sarnoff, and Haas reprising their roles. The pit orchestra of 38 included 16 percussionists. It closed on December 4 after 88 performances; no recording was made due to an American Federation of Musicians strike.

Magdalena was revived in concert form under conductor Evans Haile on November 24, 1987, at Alice Tully Hall in New York's Lincoln Center; a recording with a slightly different cast was made in RCA's studios in 1988 and issued by CBS (later Sony) in 1989 (ASIN: B0000026QF). In 1992, Ohio Light Opera, a summer festival in Wooster, Ohio, presented a fully-staged revival, the first since 1948. The work was performed in Australia in the 1990s as part of the Opera Festival in Ballarat, Victoria, again under Haile. More recently the Théâtre du Châtelet in Paris announced a production to open in May 2010, with Kate Whoriskey directing and Warren Adams supplying choreography.

== Critical reception ==
The play received a withering review from Brooks Atkinson of the New York Times, who called it "one of the most overpoweringly dull musical dramas of all time" and compared its slow plot to "being hit over the head with a sledge hammer repeatedly all evening," adding: "It hurts." He was kinder to Villa-Lobos's score: "Disentangled from the appalling libretto and lyrics of 'Magdalena,' the score might be stimulating, especially since the orchestrations are unhackneyed and an accomplished singing actress, like Irra Petina, can give her numbers brilliance and eloquence."

Other critics were far more positive. John Chapman in the New York Daily News, while dismissing the book as "secondary," called the play "a bold and stunning departure in the musical theater ... a flaming, opulent, disturbing and imaginative work which does not fit into any of the standard patterns." He praised Villa-Lobos' score as "busy, immensely intricate and strangely, fascinatingly orchestrated."

== Musical numbers ==
As presented in 1948
Act I

- Women Weaving
- Petacal
- The Seed of God
- The Omen Bird
- My Bus and I
- The Emerald
- The Civilized People
- Food For Thought
- Come to Colombia
- Plan It by the Planets
- Bon Soir, Paris
- Travel, Travel, Travel
- Magdalena
- The Broken Pianolita
- Greeting
- The River Song
- Chivor Dance
- My Bus and I (Reprise)
- The Forbidden Orchid

Act II

- Ceremonial
- The Singing Tree
- Lost
- Freedom!
- Vals de Espana
- The Emerald (Reprise)
- Piece de Resistance
- The Broken Bus
- The Seed of God (Reprise)
