= George Forrest (author) =

American musical theatre composer (1915-1999)

- Also known as: Chet Forrest
- Born: George Forrest Chichester Jr. July 31, 1915
- Origin: Brooklyn, New York
- Died: October 10, 1999 (aged 84) Miami, Florida, United States
- Genres: Musical theatre
- Occupations: Songwriter, lyricist
- Instrument: Piano

George Forrest (born George Forrest Chichester Jr., July 31, 1915 – October 10, 1999) was an American writer of music and lyrics for musical theatre best known for the show Kismet, adapted from the works of Alexander Borodin. He was also known professionally at times as Chet Forrest.

== Biography ==
Throughout his career Forrest worked exclusively with the composer-lyricist Robert Wright. The two men had an affinity for adapting classical music themes and adding lyrics to these themes for the Broadway musical stage and films. Wright said that the music was usually a 50-50 "collaboration" between Wright and Forrest and the composer. While both men were credited equally as composer-lyricists, it was Forrest who worked with the music.

Kismet was one of several works Forrest created with Wright commissioned by impresario Edwin Lester for the Los Angeles Civic Light Opera (LACLO). Song of Norway, Gypsy Lady, Magdalena, and their adaptation of The Great Waltz were also commissioned by Lester for the LACLO. The LACLO then exported most of these productions to Broadway. Forrest and Wright won a Tony Award for their work on Kismet. In 1995, they were awarded the ASCAP Foundation Richard Rodgers Award.

Forrest was cremated at Van Orsdel (Northside Chapel) Crematory, Miami.

== Film work ==
- (1936) New Shoes (short feature), After the Thin Man, The Longest Night, Libeled Lady, Sinner Take All
- (1937) Bad Man of Brimstone, The Firefly, The Good Old Soak, London by Night, Madame X, Mama Steps Out, Mannequin, Man of the People, Maytime, Navy Blue and Gold, Parnell, Saratoga, You're Only Young Once
- (1938) Boys Town, The First Hundred Years, The Girl Downstairs, Happily Buried (short feature), Lord Jeff, The Magician's Daughter (short feature), Marie Antoinette, Nuts and Bolts (short feature), Our Gang Follies of 1938 (short feature), Paradise for Three, Snow Gets in Your Eyes (short feature), Sweethearts, Three Comrades, The Toy Wife, Vacation from Love
- (1939) Balalaika, Broadway Serenade, Florian, The Hardys Ride High, Honolulu, Let Freedom Ring, Music in My Heart, Strange Cargo, These Glamour Girls, The Women
- (1940) Blondie Goes Latin, Dance, Girl, Dance, Kit Carson, The New Moon, South of Pago-Pago
- (1941) Cubana, Fiesta, Playing with Music, I Married an Angel
- (1942) Rio Rita
- (1955) Kismet, Make Believe Ballroom, Rainbow 'Round My Shoulder
- (1970) Song of Norway (This film featured adaptations of different music of Edvard Grieg than that of the 1944 Broadway show of the same title.)
- (1972) The Great Waltz

Hit songs of their day include "The Donkey Serenade" (written with composer Herbert Stothart, "based on a theme of Rudolf Friml") from The Firefly, "Always and Always" from Mannequin and "It's a Blue World" from Music in My Heart.

== Shows ==
- Song of Norway (1944); adapting the music of Edvard Grieg
- Gypsy Lady (Romany Love) (1947); using the music of Victor Herbert
- Magdalena (1948); using the music of Heitor Villa-Lobos; working directly with the composer
- The Great Waltz (1949); adapting the music of Johann Strauss I and Johann Strauss II
- Kismet (1953); adapting the music of Alexander Borodin
- At the Grand (1958); original music and lyrics
- The Love Doctor (London, 1959); original music and lyrics
- Kean (1961); original music and lyrics
- Anya (1965); adapting the music of Sergei Rachmaninoff
- Timbuktu! (1978); a reworking of Kismet for an African-American cast, adding a few new songs
- Grand Hotel (1989); a reworking of At the Grand with additional music and lyrics by Maury Yeston

Hit songs of the day include "Strange Music" from Song of Norway; and "Stranger in Paradise", "Baubles, Bangles, & Beads" and "And This Is My Beloved" from Kismet.
