= Song of Norway =

1944 operetta

- Music: Edvard Grieg adapted by: Robert Wright; George Forrest
- Lyrics: Robert Wright; George Forrest
- Book: Milton Lazarus and Homer Curran
- Productions: 1944 Broadway; 1945 West End, London; 1970 Film

Song of Norway is an operetta written in 1944 by Robert Wright and George Forrest, adapted from the music of Edvard Grieg and the book by Milton Lazarus and Homer Curran. A very loose film adaptation with major changes to both the book and music was released in 1970.

== Stage production ==
Song of Norway was originally developed and presented in Los Angeles by Edwin Lester's Los Angeles Civic Light Opera in 1944, with essentially the same cast as seen later on Broadway. It was also performed in San Francisco. The show opened at the Imperial Theatre in New York on August 21, 1944, and ran for 860 performances. Charles K. Freeman directed while George Balanchine was responsible for the choreography. The sets, costumes, and lighting design was by Lemuel Ayers. while Lawrence Brooks starred as Edvard Grieg. The original Broadway cast featured Irra Petina as a fictional opera singer Louisa Giovanni and Kent Edwards as Elnar. The show featured dances, both ballet and Norwegian folk dances, performed by the Ballet Russe de Monte-Carlo. Maria Tallchief, one of the featured dancers, married Balanchine during the run of the show. Ballet dancer James Starbuck portrayed the roles of Freddy and Tito in the Broadway production.

It ran in London for 526 performances at the Palace Theatre, the first Broadway show to cross the Atlantic after the end of the Second World War.

== Story line ==
The show is set in and around Norway in Troldhaugen and Bergen; as well as Copenhagen and Rome in and after 1860. It follows the fictionalized lives of three childhood friends: Edvard Grieg (played in New York by Lawrence Brooks), Nina Hagerup (Helena Bliss) and Rikard Nordraak (Robert Shafer). The play tells of the early struggles of Edvard Grieg and his attempts to develop an authentic Norwegian national music. Grieg dreams of being a great composer and these dreams are shared by his friend Nordraak and Grieg's sweetheart, Nina. Grieg is lured to Italy by the great prima donna Louisa Giovanni, but he finds he cannot create amid all the glitter and excitement and so returns to Norway and his beloved Nina to write his music.

The melody of the Norwegian National Anthem, Ja, vi elsker dette landet was actually written by Rikard Nordraak to lyrics written by the Norwegian national poet, Bjørnstjerne Bjørnson. Although Nordraak was in fact the composer who wrote the national anthem, he was portrayed as a poet in the show because it was believed "two composers would be confusing".

== Music ==
Songs include "Prelude & Legend" (based on Grieg's Piano Concerto in A minor), "Freddy and His Fiddle" (based on Norwegian Dance No.2), "Now" (based on Violin Sonata No. 2, and Waltz from Lyric Pieces), "Strange Music" (based on Wedding Day at Troldhaugen), "Midsummer's Eve" (based on One Balmy Summer Eve from Five Poems, Op.26, and Scherzo in E from Lyric Pieces), and "I Love You" (Ich Liebe Dich, from Melodies of the Heart, Op.5).

The original Broadway cast recording was released by Decca Records on 6 78-rpm 12 inch discs. Irra Petina was under contract to a competing record label (Columbia), so her part in the "original cast" was sung by Kitty Carlisle, who never actually played the part on Broadway. Decca later released a 33 1/3 rpm single disc LP, with some edits to fit the single-disc medium. In 2004, Decca finally released the full original album on CD. Columbia Records made a recording in 1959 of the Jones Beach production (which opened in June 1958) with Brenda Lewis and John Reardon, which was released on CD by Masterworks Broadway.

== See also ==
- Song of Norway (film)
