= Milton Lazarus =

American dramatist (1898/99–1955)

Milton Lazarus (1898 or 1899 – March 1, 1955) was an American playwright and screenwriter.

He began his career as a Press Agent before pursuing a career as a writer. He wrote the book for the Broadway musicals Shoot the Works (1931), New Faces of 1936 (1936), and Song of Norway (1944). Several of his stage plays were also mounted on Broadway, including Whatever Goes Up (1935), I Want a Policeman (1936), Every Man for Himself (1940), and The Sun Field (1942). His play Sudden Money was adapted into a 1939 film. Lazarus also wrote the screenplays to the films When the Lights Go On Again (1944) and Paris Follies of 1956 (1955).

He died at Good Samaritan Hospital in Los Angeles at the age of 56.
