= List of compositions by Alexander Borodin =

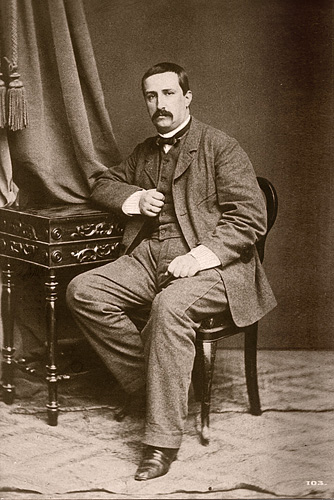
Alexander Borodin

This list of compositions by Alexander Borodin (1833–1887) is sorted by genre.

== Operas ==
Title	Start	End	Libretto	Notes
The Tsar's Bride	1867	1868		sketches, lost
Bogatyri	1878		Viktor Krylov	Opera farce in 5 Scenes, based on music by Rossini, Meyerbeer, Offenbach, Serov, Verdi, etc., orchestrated by E. Merten
Prince Igor	1869	1887	Borodin, after "The Lay of Prince Igor"	Unfinished opera with a prologue and 4 acts. Orch. Rimsky-Korsakov and Glazunov 1887/88. First performance, St. Petersburg 1890. Includes the Polovtsian Dances
Mlada, Act 4	1872	1872	Viktor Krylov	Part of unperformed collaborative ballet-opera-spectacle by Cui (Act 1), Mussorgsky and Rimsky-Korsakov (Acts 2 and 3), and Borodin (Act 4), with ballet music by Minkus. Borodin used material from his unfinished Prince Igor as the basis for Act 4. Finale orchestrated by Rimsky-Korsakov as a concert piece (1892)

== Orchestral works ==
Title	Start	End	Notes
Symphony No. 1 in E♭	1862	1867	First published 1875 (arr. piano 4 hands by the composer); 1882 (full score)
Symphony No. 2 in B minor	1869	1876	first pub. 1878 (arr. piano 4 hands by the composer); Borodin's orchestration slightly revised by Rimsky-Korsakov and Glazunov for publication of 1887 full score.
In the Steppes of Central Asia	1880	1880	first pub. 1882 (arr. piano 4 hands by the composer); 1882 (full score)
Symphony No. 3 in A minor	1886	1887	first two movements only, completed and orchestrated by Glazunov.

== Chamber music ==
Title	Start	End	Notes
Piano Trio	1850	1860	3 movements only, last movement is lost
Quartet for flute, oboe, viola, and cello	1852	1856	based on music by Joseph Haydn
String Trio in G major for 2 violins and cello	1852 ?	1856 ?	only first 2 movements completed
String Trio in G minor for 2 violins and cello	1855	1855	One movement (Andantino) only. Based on the Russian folk-song "Чем тебя я огорчила" (Chem tebya ya ogorchila) "What did I do to upset you"
String Quintet in F minor for 2 violins, viola and 2 cellos	1859	1860	coda of finale completed by O.A. Yevlachov (1960)
String Sextet in D minor	1860	1861	only two movements survive
Sonata in B minor for cello and piano	1860	1860	Based on the Fugue from J. S. Bach's Violin Sonata no. 1 in G minor BWV 1001
Piano Trio in D major	1860	1861	for violin, cello and piano
Piano Quintet in C minor	1862	1862	for string quartet and piano
String Quartet No. 1 in A	1874	1879	
String Quartet No. 2 in D	1881	1881	
Scherzo for String Quartet	1882	1882	from Mitrofan Belyayev's collection "Fridays". Also used by Glazunov in his completion of Borodin's 3rd Symphony
Serenata alla spagnola for String Quartet	1886	1886	From the collective quartet "B-La-F" with Rimsky-Korsakov, Glazunov and Lyadov

== Works for piano ==
Title	Hands	Start	End	Notes
Petite Suite	2	c1870	1885	1. At the Convent 2. Intermezzo 3. Mazurka I 4. Mazurka II 5. Rêverie 6. Serénade 7. Nocturne. Orchestrated by Glazunov, including the A♭ Scherzo (below) as part of the last movement
Scherzo in A♭	2	1885		Arr. 4 hands by Théodore Jadoul, the dedicatee. Included in the last movement of Glazunov's orchestration of the Petite Suite (above).
Paraphrases on Chopsticks	3	1874	1878	Polka, Funeral March, Requiem (with words) and Mazurka; in a collection of pieces by Borodin, Cui, Lyadov and Rimsky-Korsakov. 2nd edition includes pieces by Liszt and Nikolai Shcherbachov
Hélène-Polka in D minor	4	1843	1861	written in 1843 when the composer was 9 years old, revised and transcribed for 4 hands by the composer in 1861.
Allegretto in D♭	4	1861		Arrangement of the 3rd movement of the String Quintet
Scherzo in E major	4	1861		
Tarantella in D major	4	1862		

== Solo songs ==
Title	Russian	Transliteration	Original Text	Start	End	Notes
Why did you grow pale early	Что ты рано, зоренька	Shto ty rano, zaren'ka	Sergey Solovyov	1852	1855	
The beautiful girl does not love me	Разлюбила красна девица	Razlyubila krasna devitsa	A. Vinogradov	1853	1855	for voice, cello and piano
Listen to my song, my friends	Слушайте, подруженьки, песенку мою	Slushaite, podruzhen'ki, pesenku moyu	Iven Kruse	1853	1855	for voice, cello and piano
Thou lovely fisher-girl	Красавица рыбачка!	Krasavitsa rybachka	Heinrich Heine	1854	1855	for voice, cello and piano. Ger. original: "Du schönes Fischermädchen"
The Sleeping Princess	Спящая княжна	Spyashchaya knyazhna	Borodin	1867	1867	also orch. Rimsky-Korsakov
My songs are full of poison	Отравой полны мои песни	Otravoy polny moyi pyesni	Heine	1868	1868	Ger. original "Vergiftet sind meine Lieder"
The Sea Princess	Морская царевна	Morskaya Tsar'yevna	Borodin	1868	1868	
Song of the Dark Woods (Old song)	Песня темного леса (Старая песня)	Pesnya tyomnovo lesa	Borodin	1868	1868	also arr. Glazunov for two-part male chorus and orch. (1873)
The False Note	Фальшивая нота	Fal'shivaya nota	Borodin	1868	1868	
The Sea	Mope	Mor'ye	Borodin	1870	1870	orch. by the composer (1884) and also by Rimsky-Korsakov (1896)
From my tears	Из слез моих	Iz slyoz moyikh	Heine	1870	1870	Ger. original: "Aus meinen Tränen"
For the shores of your far homeland	Для берегов отчизны дальной	Dlya beregov otchizny dal'noy	Pushkin	1881	1881	Published 1888. Also orchestrated by Glazunov (1912)
To the people at home	У людей-то в дому	U lyudey-to v domu	Nekrasov	1881	1881	
Arabian melody	Арабская мелодия	Arabskaya Melodiya	Borodin	1881	1881	
Pride	Спесь	Spjes'	A. K. Tolstoy	1884	1885	
The Magic Garden	Чудный сад	Chudnyy sad	Georges Collin	1885	1885	Fr. original "Septain"

== Other vocal works ==
Title		Date	Notes
Serenade of Four Knights for One Lady	comic quartet for male voices and piano	1870	
God save Kyril! God save Methodius!	for unaccompanied men's chorus	1885	unfinished, completed by Pavel Lamm

== Transcriptions for piano 4 hands ==
Title	Date	Notes
Allegretto in D♭	1861	arrangement of the 3rd movement of the String Quintet
Symphony No. 1	1875	
Symphony No. 2	1878	
In the Steppes of Central Asia	1882	
String Quartet No. 1	1887	

== Lost works ==
Title	Date	Notes
Concerto in D for flute and piano	1847	
String Trio for 2 violins and cello	1847	on a theme from Meyerbeer's Robert le Diable
Le Courant – etude for piano	1849	
Fantasy on a theme by Hummel	1849	
Fugues – for piano	1851/52	
Scherzo in B minor for piano	1852	
Fugue for piano	1862	
