= National Philharmonic Orchestra =

British orchestra

The National Philharmonic Orchestra was a British orchestra created exclusively for recording purposes. It was founded by RCA Records producer and conductor Charles Gerhardt and orchestra leader and contractor Sidney Sax. The orchestra was created partly due to the requirements of an extensive recording project for the Reader's Digest.

== History ==
Before settling on this name, the orchestra began operation in 1964 using a variety of names including RCA Victor Symphony Orchestra and the London Promenade (the latter consisting almost entirely of personnel from the London Philharmonic Orchestra). In 1971, the orchestra was incorporated as the National Philharmonic Orchestra by Sidney Sax. Musicians from London's huge talent pool were contracted by Gerhardt and Sax. By way of example, the violin section would routinely be peppered with leaders / concertmasters of all the major London orchestras, past and present, such as John Ronayne, Bela Dekany, Lionel Bentley, Derek Jacobs, John Ludlow, John Brown, Donald Weekes, Irvine Arditti, Charles Meinardi, Hans Geiger, etc. The orchestra recorded exclusively for RCA Records until Decca Records began recording the orchestra in March, 1974. This was for a Phase 4 Stereo recording of the Yellow River Piano Concerto conducted by Elgar Howarth. Columbia Records began using the orchestra for recordings in 1975.

Several conductors, such as Leopold Stokowski, Riccardo Chailly, Richard Bonynge, Charles Gerhardt, Michael Kamen, Carlos Païta and Loris Tjeknavorian have made recordings with the orchestra. Bonynge recorded all three of Tchaikovsky's ballets for Decca. With producer George Korngold, Gerhardt made a series of stereo recordings of Hollywood film music with the orchestra for RCA Red Seal (the now legendary "Classic film scores "series) and Kamen recorded Eric Clapton's orchestral sessions from the 24 Nights concerts at the Royal Albert Hall in 1990 and 1991 for Duck Records. Carlos Païta recorded Tchaikovsky's Symphony No. 6 (Pathétique Symphony), Mussorgsky, Glinka, and Borodin for Lodia. In 1977, Tjeknavorian and the orchestra recorded Borodin's Symphony No. 2, In the Steppes of Central Asia, and opera Prince Igor (including Polovtsian Dances) for RCA Red Seal.

The orchestra has been featured on the soundtrack of many films (particularly those scored by Jerry Goldsmith, Maurice Jarre and Robert O. Ragland) as well as a selection of Star Wars suites from the John Williams catalogue. Bernard Herrmann regularly used the orchestra for recordings of his film work.

Kenneth Schermerhorn conducted the orchestra on the soundtrack of Baryshnikov's production The Nutcracker, a staging of Tchaikovsky's ballet which became a television classic, after being presented live onstage. The orchestra also provided the music for the stage production.

The National Philharmonic Orchestra has since been disbanded.

== Film music ==
Some of the film scores recorded in England and performed by the National Philharmonic Orchestra:

- The Blue Max (1966)
- Justine (1969) album re-recording; not the film recording.
- The Last Run (1971)
- The Exorcist (1973)
- Ransom (1974)
- High Velocity (1974)
- Barry Lyndon (1975)
- The Man Who Would Be King (1975)
- Paper Tiger (1975)
- Take a Hard Ride (1975)
- Grizzly (1976)
- Obsession (1976)
- Pony Express Rider (1976)
- The Pink Panther Strikes Again (1976)
- The Omen trilogy (1976–81)
- Providence (1977)
- Jesus of Nazareth (1977 mini-series)
- March or Die (1977)
- Valentino (1977)
- Holocaust (1978 mini-series)
- The Wild Geese (1978)
- Revenge of the Pink Panther (1978)
- The Boys from Brazil (1978)
- Who Is Killing the Great Chefs of Europe? (1978)
- The One Man Jury (1978)
- The Great Train Robbery (1978)
- Jaguar Lives! (1979)
- Alien (1979)
- Mountain Family Robinson (1979)
- Caboblanco (1980)
- The Changeling (1980)
- The Missing Link (1980)
- Mama Dracula (1980)
- The Sea Wolves (1980)
- The Elephant Man (1980)
- Windwalker (1981)
- Outland (1981)
- Roar (1981)
- Night Crossing (1982)
- Pink Floyd – The Wall (1982, Outside the Wall)
- The Secret of NIMH (1982)
- First Blood (1982)
- Trail of the Pink Panther (1982)
- The Wicked Lady (1983)
- The Dead Zone (1983)
- Mutant (1984)
- Supergirl (1984)
- The Philadelphia Experiment (1984)
- Santa Claus: The Movie (1985)
- Pee-wee's Big Adventure (1985) Varese Sarabande album re-recording; not the film recording.
- Brazil (1985)
- Rambo: First Blood Part II (1985)
- Legend (1985)
- Revolution (1985)
- Link (1986)
- Sky Bandits (1986)
- Highlander (1986)
- Superman IV: The Quest for Peace (1987)
- Suspect (1987)
- The Adventures of Baron Munchausen (1988)
- Licence to Kill (1989)
- Total Recall (1990)
- Not Without My Daughter (1991)
- Medicine Man (1992)
- Basic Instinct (1992)
- Mom and Dad Save the World (1992)
- The Public Eye (1992) (rejected score)
- Tom and Jerry: The Movie (1992)
- Matinee (1993)
- Malice (1993)
- Son of the Pink Panther (1993)
- Cliffhanger (1993)
- Bad Girls (1994)
- Powder (1995)
- The Ghost and the Darkness (1996)
- Fierce Creatures (1997)
