= Stranger in Paradise (song) =

1953 song by Robert Wright and George Forrest

Single by Tony Bennett
- B-side: "Why Does it Have to Be Me?"
- Published: 1953 Frank Music Corp.
- Released: November 2, 1953
- Recorded: October 13, 1953
- Studio: CBS 30th Street Studio, New York City
- Genre: Show tune, Popular Music
- Length: 3:05
- Label: Columbia 40121
- Songwriters: Alexander Borodin, Robert Wright, George Forrest

Tony Bennett singles chronology
"Rags to Riches" (1953)	"Stranger in Paradise" (1953)	"There'll Be No Teardrops Tonight" (1954)

"Stranger in Paradise" is a popular song from the musical Kismet (1953), credited to Robert Wright and George Forrest. Like almost all the music in that show, the melody was adapted from music composed by Alexander Borodin (1833–1887), in this case, the "Gliding Dance of the Maidens", from the Polovtsian Dances in the opera Prince Igor (1890). The song in the musical is a lovers' duet and describes the transcendent feelings that love brings to their surroundings. Later versions were mostly edited to be sung by male solo artists.

== Meaning ==
In Act 1 of the musical Kismet, the beautiful Marsinah is viewing the garden of a house her father wishes to buy. The young Caliph, who is dressed in disguise, has already been struck by her beauty from afar and enters the garden pretending to be a gardener, so that he might speak to her. She begins to sing about how the garden has been strangely transformed before her eyes. He takes over the song and sings about how he, too, strangely feels he has entered paradise when he stands beside an angel such as she. In the song he asks for an indication that she feels the same way about him. Though she feels a strong draw to him she breaks from the song and asks him a mundane question about what flowers to plant. He asks her to meet him again in the garden at moonrise, and she instantly agrees. He asks her to promise she'll keep her rendezvous, and she now takes up the song, singing that it was his face that had made her feel in paradise. They now sing together that they are in bliss in each other's company and how much they need to know the other cares.

== Notable performances ==
A popular adaptation of Borodin's theme from Prince Igor titled "My Fantasy" which used the same melody as "Stranger in Paradise" was recorded by Artie Shaw and sung by Pauline Byrne in 1940, though the lyrics differ completely from "Stranger in Paradise". Richard Kiley and Doretta Morrow performed the song in the original cast of Kismet (1953). Vic Damone and Ann Blyth performed the song in the 1955 film.

The most popular version was sung by Tony Bennett (1953), but other versions by The Four Aces (backed by the Jack Pleis Orchestra) and Tony Martin also received popular favor in 1953. Bennett's version reached number one in the UK Singles Chart in May 1955. It was not until 1955 that Kismet, and thus the songs from the show, came to London. It was Bennett's debut hit record in the United Kingdom.

The huge popularity of "Stranger in Paradise" in the UK is reflected by the fact that no fewer than six versions charted in 1955: besides the chart topper by Tony Bennett, others include the versions by the Four Aces (No. 6), Tony Martin (No. 6), Bing Crosby (No. 17), Don Cornell (No. 19), as well as an instrumental version by Eddie Calvert (No. 14) in the UK chart listings. In the same year, the song was recorded in France by Gloria Lasso as Étranger au paradis.

Other artists who have recorded cover versions of this standard include Billy Eckstine with the Hal Mooney Orchestra, Mose Allison, Peter Bernstein, Sarah Brightman, Sammy Davis Jr., Percy Faith, Al Hirt, Engelbert Humperdinck, Gordon MacRae, Johnny Mathis, Keely Smith, Ray Conniff, Curtis Counce, Isaac Hayes, the Ink Spots, Jack Jones, Mantovani, Martin Denny, Wes Montgomery, André Rieu, Saint Etienne, Alexander Armstrong, George Shearing, Sun Ra, the Supremes, Della Reese, Lenny Welch and Toots Thielemans. Neil Young has performed the song live.

In 1965, the Ventures released their version of the song, renamed "The Stranger" and "Ten Seconds To Heaven".

In 1975, The Belmonts recorded their version, for Strawberry Records.

An instrumental arrangement of the song is used in the 1979 Russ Meyer movie Beneath the Valley of the Ultra-Vixens.

In 1997, The Rapsody released a rap song with vocals performed by American rapper Warren G, the Russian refrain by acclaimed Norwegian soprano Sissel Kyrkjebø, and the instrumental background provided by The Rapsody Overture.

In the film Breakfast of Champions (1999), based on the book of the same name by Kurt Vonnegut Jr., the song is used as a recurring motif.

In the 2001 anime series RahXephon the song is used as a recurring motif.

In 2011, Tony Bennett rerecorded the song as a duet with Andrea Bocelli for Bennett's album Duets II. Also in 2011, the anime Appleseed XIII used instrumental versions of the song for both its starting and ending themes.

In 2018, Jun'ichi Kanemaru recorded a cover of the song for his namesake EP.
