= Scherzo in A-flat major (Borodin) =

Composition by Alexander Borodin

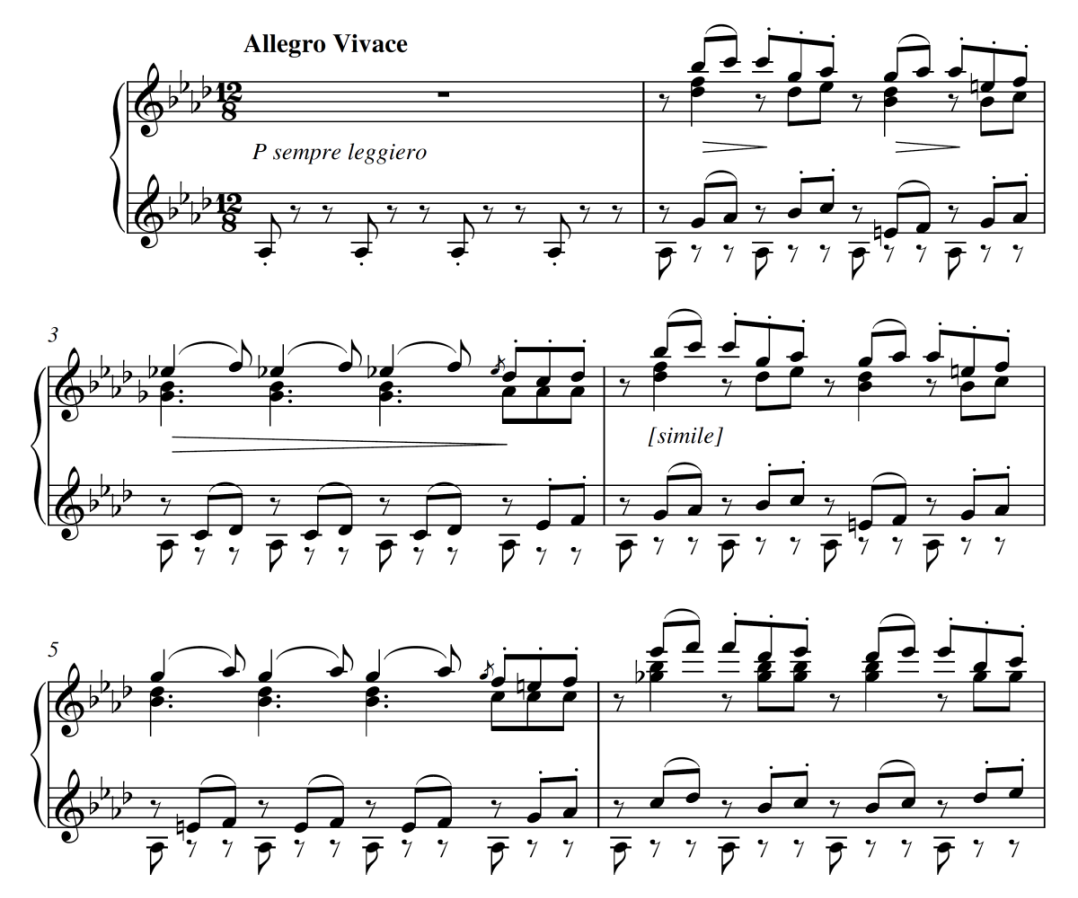
The first six bars of Borodin's Scherzo in A♭ major

Alexander Borodin's Scherzo in A♭ major is a lively piece written in 1885, while Borodin was in Belgium for an early performance of his then incomplete opera Prince Igor. It was originally written for solo piano, but in 1889 Alexander Glazunov orchestrated it, along with the Petite Suite. Borodin dedicated the piece to Théodore Jadoul, who made a four-hand piano arrangement of it.

== Style ==
The Scherzo can be recognized as one of Borodin's compositions instantaneously because of its bright tone, pounding rhythms, and exciting melodies. In the main theme of the piece a constant rhythm is used, giving it a clear beat, but unfortunately, this also makes it very challenging for the pianist due to the constant jumps required. The piece often modulates, making it more interesting and varied. Played at the correct speed, the piece only lasts around three minutes. However, this "miniature" offers an admirable summary of its composer's style.

== Recordings ==
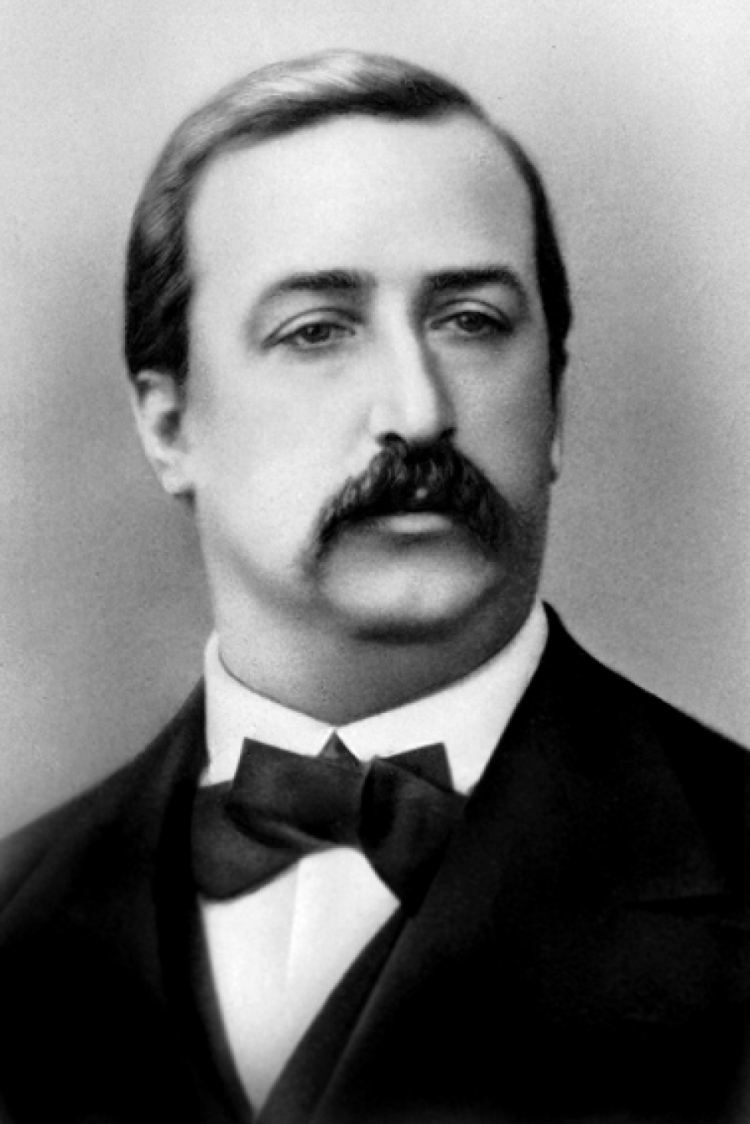
Alexander Borodin

The following pianists have recorded the piece:

Pianist	Duration	Record label	Recording Date
Vladimir Ashkenazy	02:48	Philips Records	1983
Margaret Fingerhut	02:58	Chandos Records	1985
Philip Edward Fisher	03:22	Chandos Records	2011
Roberto Giordano	03:12	Cypress Records	2004
Dirk Joeres	02:59	Largo Records	1986
Vladimir Leyetchkiss	03:15	Centaur Records	1991
Sergei Rachmaninoff	02:57	RCA Victor	1935
Marco Rapetti	03:21	Brilliant Classics	2008
Victor Ryabchikov	03:04	Olympia Records	1999
Joseph Villa	02:49	Dante Records	1980

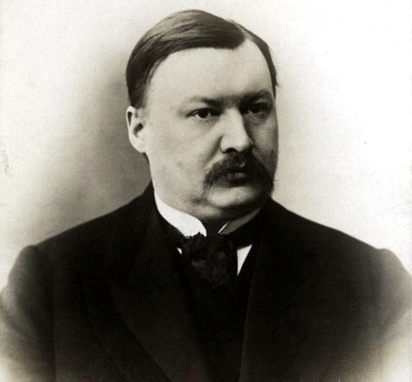
Alexander Glazunov

== Orchestration ==
In 1889, just two years after Borodin's death, Alexander Glazunov orchestrated the Petite Suite. Glazunov's orchestration of the Suite makes the 7th movement (Finale) the Scherzo, with the Nocturne inserted inside it as a trio section. The total length of the movement is around eight minutes.

== See also ==
- List of compositions by Alexander Borodin
