= The Rapsody Overture =

Studio album by The Rapsody
- Released: 1997
- Recorded: 1997
- Studio: Soundtrack (New York City, U.S.); Chung King (New York City); Opus 80 (Frankfurt, Germany); Unique (New York City); Sourcerer Sound (New York City); Boogy Park (Hamburg, Germany); Home (Groß-Zimmern); Rundfunkstudios (Budapest, Hungary)
- Genre: Hip hop; classical
- Label: Mercury Records; Def Jam Records
- Producer: Voelker Brothers

The Rapsody chronology
The Rapsody Overture (1997)	Hip Hop Meets World (2000)

Singles from The Rapsody Overture
- 1. "Prince Igor" Released: October 13, 1997; 2. "Dear Mallika" Released: April 1, 1998

The Rapsody Overture: Hip Hop Meets Classic is a concept album of remixes consisting of hip hop and classical, which combined American rappers with European opera singers. It was released in 1997 by Mercury Records and distributed by Def Jam Recordings.

"Prince Igor" was a #1 hit across Europe in 1998, a duet between American rapper Warren G and Norwegian singer Sissel. Sissel sang an aria from Alexander Borodin's opera Prince Igor during the chorus, while Warren G rapped.

The Xzibit track "E Lucean Le Stelle" contains a sample from Giacomo Puccini's E Lucevan Le Stelle, though it is misspelled.

== 1997 Track listing ==
#	Name	Artist(s)	Vocals	Composer	Time
1	"Intro"				1:15
2	"E Lucean Le Stelle"	Xzibit		Giacomo Puccini (E Lucevan Le Stelle)	3:51
3	"Dear Mallika"	LL Cool J	Heike Therjung & Kathy Magestro	Léo Delibes (The Flower Duet)	4:05
4	"E Lucean Le Stelle" (Reprise)			Puccini (E Lucevan Le Stelle)	1:45
5	"Delilah"	Reverend Run of Run-DMC	Gabrielle Fiodoresku	Saint-Saëns (Mon coeur s'ouvre à ta voix)	4:00
6	"Prince Igor"	Warren G	Sissel Kyrkjebø	Alexander Borodin (Polovetsian Dances)	4:20
7	"Belle Nuit"	Mother Superia	Heike Therjung & Kathy Magestro	Jacques Offenbach (Belle nuit, ô nuit d'amour)	3:45
8	"Präludium"	Jay	Chris Weller (Piano)	Johann Sebastian Bach (Prelude No.1 in C Major BWV846)	2:05
9	"Ach So Fromm"	Jay	Robert Gionfribbo	Friedrich von Flotow (M’apparì)	4:56
10	"Syrinx"	Redman	Dieter Voelker (Guitar)	Claude Debussy (Syrinx)	3:34
11	"Vissi D'Arte"	Onyx	Kathy Magestro	Puccini (Vissi d'arte)	4:29
12	"Schwanensee"	Scoota	Dieter Voelker (Guitar)	Pyotr Ilyich Tchaikovsky (Swan Lake)	3:02
13	"Recondita Armonica"	Nikki D	Kim Chung Park	Puccini (Recondita armonia)	4:26
14	"Nessun Dorma"	Mobb Deep	Kim Chung Park	Puccini (Nessun dorma)	3:32

== 1998 Track listing ==
New version with different track listing on April 21, 1998

#	Name	Artist(s)	Vocals	Writer(s)	Time
1	"Intro"				1:15
2	"E Lucean Le Stelle"	Xzibit		Giacomo Puccini (E Lucevan Le Stelle)	3:51
3	"Dear Mallika"	LL Cool J	Heike Therjung & Kathy Magestro	Léo Delibes (The Flower Duet)	4:05
4	"E Lucean Le Stelle" (Reprise)			Puccini (E Lucevan Le Stelle)	1:45
5	"Grâce"	Expression Direkt			4:06
6	"Dear Mallika (D.O.N.S. Alternative Mix)"	LL Cool J	Heike Therjung & Kathy Magestro	Léo Delibes (The Flower Duet)	4:11
7	"Prince Igor (Ries Class Jazz Extended)"	Warren G	Sissel Kyrkjebø	Alexander Borodin (Polovetsian Dances)	6:05
8	"Prince Igor"	Warren G	Sissel Kyrkjebø	Alexander Borodin (Polovetsian Dances)	4:22
9	"Belle Nuit"	Mother Superia	Heike Therjung & Kathy Magestro	Jacques Offenbach (Belle nuit, ô nuit d'amour)	3:45
10	"Präludium"	Jay	Chris Weller (Piano)	Johann Sebastian Bach	2:05
11	"Ach So Fromm"	Jay	Robert Gionfribbo	Friedrich von Flotow (M’apparì)	4:56
12	"Syrinx"	Redman	Dieter Voelker (Guitar)	Claude Debussy (Syrinx)	3:34
13	"Vissi D'Arte"	Onyx	Kathy Magestro	Puccini (Vissi d'arte)	4:29
14	"Schwanensee"	Scoota	Dieter Voelker (Guitar)	Pyotr Ilyich Tchaikovsky (Swan Lake)	3:02
15	"Recondita Armonica"	Nikki D	Kim Chung Park	Puccini (Recondita armonia)	4:26
16	"Nessun Dorma"	Mobb Deep	Kim Chung Park	Puccini (Nessun dorma)	3:32
