= Carlos Païta =

Argentine conductor (1932–2015)

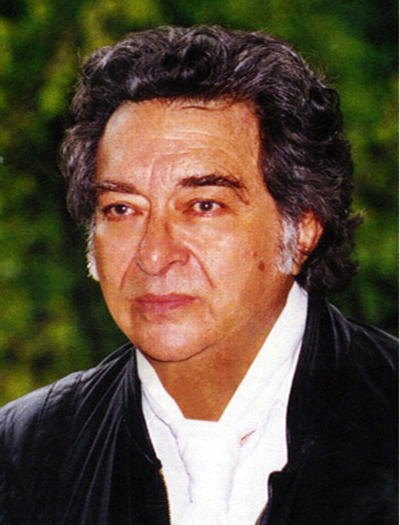
Portrait of Carlos Paita

Carlos Païta (10 March 1932 – 19 December 2015) was an Argentine conductor. He was born in Buenos Aires.

His father was originally from Hungary, his mother was a singer from Italy. At a young age, Païta attended rehearsals by Wilhelm Furtwängler at the Teatro Colón. Later he studied conducting with Artur Rodziński. He started his professional career at the Colón Theater in Buenos Aires. He first conducted the Stuttgart Radio Symphony Orchestra in 1966 and moved permanently to Europe in 1968. He made his US debut with the Houston Symphony Orchestra in 1979. As of 2003, he was resident in Geneva.

Paita was awarded the Grand Prix du Disque for his 1968 recording on the London Records - Phase 4 Stereo Concert Series album A Wagner Festival. This LP featured selections from Tristan und Isolde, The Flying Dutchman and Die Meistersinger von Nürnberg.

He was also awarded the Grand Prix du Disque for his 1978 LP recording of Berlioz's Symphonie Fantastique with the London Symphony Orchestra.

He is largely noted for a series of recordings issued on his own Lodia Records label. As of 2006, this label went out of business; these records are highly sought-after collector's items.

He died in Geneva, Switzerland on 19 December 2015 at the age of 83.

== Discography ==
- Beethoven, Coriolan Overture, London Philharmonic Orchestra
- Beethoven, Leonore Overture III, Netherlands Radio Philharmonic Orchestra
- Beethoven, Third Symphony ("Eroica"), Scottish National Orchestra
- Beethoven, Fifth Symphony, Philharmonic Symphony Orchestra
- Beethoven, Seventh Symphony, Philharmonic Symphony Orchestra
- Berlioz, Symphonie Fantastique, London Symphony Orchestra
- Borodin, In the Steppes of Central Asia, Philharmonic Symphony Orchestra
- Brahms, First Symphony, National Philharmonic Orchestra
- Bruckner, Eighth Symphony, Philharmonic Symphony Orchestra
- Dvořák, Seventh Symphony, Philharmonic Symphony Orchestra
- Dvořák, Eighth Symphony, Royal Philharmonic Orchestra
- Dvořák, Ninth Symphony ("From the New World"), Royal Philharmonic Orchestra
- Glinka, Ruslan and Ludmilla (overture), National Philharmonic Orchestra
- Mahler, First Symphony ("Titan"), Royal Philharmonic Orchestra
- Mussorgsky, Pictures at an Exhibition, National Philharmonic Orchestra
- Rossini, Overtures, Royal Philharmonic Orchestra
- Schubert, Ninth Symphony ("Great"), Royal Philharmonic Orchestra
- Tchaikovsky, Capriccio Italien, Russian Philharmonic Orchestra
- Tchaikovsky, Hamlet Overture-Fantasia, Russian Philharmonic Orchestra
- Tchaikovsky, Marche Slave, Russian Philharmonic Orchestra
- Tchaikovsky, Romeo and Juliet, Russian Philharmonic Orchestra
- Tchaikovsky, Fourth Symphony, Moscow New Russian Orchestra
- Tchaikovsky, Sixth Symphony ("Pathetique"), National Philharmonic Orchestra
- Verdi, Requiem, Royal Philharmonic Orchestra
- Wagner, Götterdämmerung (extracts), Ute Vinzing, James King, Philharmonia Orchestra
- Wagner, Die Meistersinger Overture, Philharmonic Symphony Orchestra
- Wagner, Rienzi Overture, Netherlands Radio Philharmonic Orchestra
- Wagner, The Flying Dutchman Overture, Philharmonic Symphony Orchestra
- Wagner, Tristan und Isolde (Prelude and Liebestod), Philharmonic Symphony Orchestra
