= Nikolai Lodyzhensky =

Russian composer

Lodyzhensky Nikolai Nikolayevich
- Лодыженский Николай Николаевич
- Born: January 1, 1842 [O.S. 20 December 1842] Saint Petersburg
- Died: February 16, 1916 (aged 74) [O.S. 2 February 1916] Petrograd
- Occupations: Composer and diplomat

Nikolai Nikolayevich Lodyzhensky (Russian: Николай Николаевич Лодыженский; 1 January 1843 [O.S. 20 December 1842] – 15 February [O.S. 2 February] 1916) was a Russian composer and diplomat.

Lodyzhensky was born in Saint Petersburg. He was the son of an impoverished landowner, and came from a musical family related to the composer Alexander Dargomyzhsky. His student years are obscure. He established a diplomatic career, and in 1866 he joined the circle of Mily Balakirev and The Five, but without abandoning his career. He was valued as an improvisor at the piano. His sister Anka fell in love with Alexander Borodin, who had to write many letters to his wife to explain his daily meetings with her.

Lodyzhensky began several symphonies; an opera, Dmitri the Usurper (based on Alexander Pushkin's play Boris Godunov); and a cantata, The Rusalka, but never finished them. He abandoned his opera when Modest Mussorgsky began writing an opera to the same libretto (which emerged later as Boris Godunov). Mussorgsky nicknamed him "Fim" (Фим; the reverse spelling of миф, the Russian word for "myth"). Borodin wrote his String Quartet No. 2 in D while spending a summer holiday at Lodyzhensky's estate at Zhitovo in 1881. Lodyzhensky himself wrote some music in the string quartet genre. The only music he ever published was Six Romances for voice and piano, in 1873, which showed great promise, displaying melodic and harmonic invention. Another set of four romances is in manuscript. His early work gained the respect of Nikolai Rimsky-Korsakov (Note: In his memoirs, Rimsky-Korsakov enumerated the circle of Balakirev: "If we leave out of account Lodyzhensky, who accomplished nothing, and Lyadov, who appeared later, Balakirev's circle consisted of Balakirev, Cui, Mussorgsky, Borodin, and me (the French have retained the denomination of "Les Cinq" for us to this day)")}} and Vladimir Stasov, but he was criticised in other quarters and this may have discouraged him from continuing to compose. In that year, 1873, he was sent to Budapest, whence he wrote to Stasov saying he could not dedicate himself to composing as he had formerly intended.

Lodyzhensky was posted to the Balkans and later to New York City, where he was Consul-General for Russia. He returned to Russia in 1907, where he was engaged on official duties, voluntary work, and founded the Society for the Unification of the Orthodox and Anglican Churches. He died in 1916 in the city of his birth (which by that time was known as Petrograd).

== Sources ==
- Grove's Dictionary of Music and Musicians, 5th edition, 1954
