= Prince Igor (song) =

1997 single by The Rapsody

Single by the Rapsody featuring Warren G and Sissel

from the album The Rapsody Overture
- Language: English; Russian
- Released: October 13, 1997
- Studio: Chung King (New York City); Unique (New York City)
- Genre: Hip hop; opera; classical
- Label: Def Jam Recordings
- Songwriters: Klaus Volker; Warren G
- Producers: Klaus Volker; Dieter Völker

Warren G singles chronology
"Smokin' Me Out" (1997)	"Prince Igor" (1997)	"All Night, All Right" (1998)

Sissel singles chronology
"Mitt hjerte alltid vanker" (1995)	"Prince Igor" (1997)	"Summer Snow" (2000)

"Prince Igor" is a song inspired by the Polovtsian Dances of Alexander Borodin's opera Prince Igor. It was released as the lead single from the hip-hop/classical concept album The Rapsody Overture in October 1997. The main vocals are performed by Warren G while the Russian refrain is sung by Norwegian soprano Sissel Kyrkjebø, and the instrumental track was provided by the Rapsody. Warren G uses the same rap lyrics as in his song "Reality", which appears on his second solo album, Take a Look Over Your Shoulder.

"Prince Igor" was successful in Europe, peaking at number one in both Iceland and Norway and entering the top 10 in Belgium, Denmark, Finland, France, Germany, Greece, the Netherlands and Sweden. On the Eurochart Hot 100, the song peaked at number six in January 1998. Outside Europe, it peaked at number 41 in New Zealand.

== Critical reception ==
Pan-European magazine Music & Media wrote, "Maybe it had to happen at some point... so blame the Voelker brothers (Achim and Klaus), a German production team who initially came up with the unlikely idea of an album combining rap with opera. This is the first single to be taken from the resulting long player, The Rapsody Overture: Hip Hop Meets Classics (due on November 3). The single uses Borodin's Prince Igor as a foundation over which Warren G raps and Norwegian folk singer Sissel provides "classical" vocals."

Programme director Marc Stingl at German AC commercial station Radio Gong in Nurnberg, Bavaria considered the track to be "a perfect chartbreaker because of the combination of rap with classical music. The Rapsody is refreshingly different because this has not really been tried before and most other chart material is pretty old-fashioned." He concluded, "This could very well be a new trend-a band called Sweetbox have been quite successful over here with a similar approach."

A reviewer from Music Week gave the song three out of five, describing it as "[a] bizarre and haunting blend of hip hop and classical." The magazine's Alan Jones wrote, "Whether it's a groudbreaker or a dead-end mutant remains to be seen but The Rapsody, US rapper Warren G's collaboration with Norwegian opera star Sissel is both intriguing and appealing. Set against a heavy hip-hop beat, Warren struts his usual stuff but the rapper/vocalist combination is given a new spin by Sissel, whose pure soprano voice intones the melody from Borodin's Prince Igor".

== Track listing ==
- "Prince Igor" (radio edit) (3:52)
- "Prince Igor" (Ries Class Jazz edit) (4:03)
- "Prince Igor" (Ries 7-inch remix) (3:54)
- "Prince Igor" (album version) (4:24)
- "Prince Igor" (Ries Class Jazz extended) (6:08)
- "Prince Igor" (Ries Class Jazz instrumental) (4:01)

== Charts ==
=== Weekly charts ===
Weekly chart performance for "Prince Igor"
Chart (1997–1998)	Peak position
Austria (Ö3 Austria Top 40)	13
Belgium (Ultratop 50 Flanders)	9
Belgium (Ultratop 50 Wallonia)	3
Denmark (IFPI)	2
Europe (Eurochart Hot 100)	6
Finland (Suomen virallinen lista)	10
France (SNEP)	6
Germany (GfK)	8
Greece (IFPI)	3
Iceland (Íslenski Listinn Topp 40)	1
Ireland (IRMA)	17
Netherlands (Dutch Top 40)	6
Netherlands (Single Top 100)	6
New Zealand (Recorded Music NZ)	41
Norway (VG-lista)	1
Scotland Singles (Official Charts)	24
Sweden (Sverigetopplistan)	3
Switzerland (Schweizer Hitparade)	11
UK Singles (Official Charts)	15
UK Hip Hop/R&B (Official Charts)	5

=== Year-end charts ===
1997 year-end chart performance for "Prince Igor"
Chart (1997)	Position
Germany (Media Control)	75
Netherlands (Dutch Top 40)	78
Netherlands (Single Top 100)	64
Norway (VG-lista)	5
Romania (Romanian Top 100)	60
Sweden (Topplistan)	23

1998 year-end chart performance for "Prince Igor"
Chart (1998)	Position
Belgium (Ultratop 50 Flanders)	98
Belgium (Ultratop 50 Wallonia)	38
Europe (Eurochart Hot 100)	39
Europe Border Breakers (Music & Media)	27
Netherlands (Dutch Top 40)	159
Netherlands (Single Top 100)	89
Sweden (Hitlistan)	45
UK Singles (OCC)	195

== Certifications ==
Region	Certification	Certified units/sales
Belgium (BRMA)	Gold	25,000^{*}
Norway (IFPI Norway)	Platinum	
Sweden (GLF)	Platinum	30,000^{^}
^{*} Sales figures based on certification alone.^{^} Shipments figures based on certification alone.
