= Petite Suite (Borodin) =

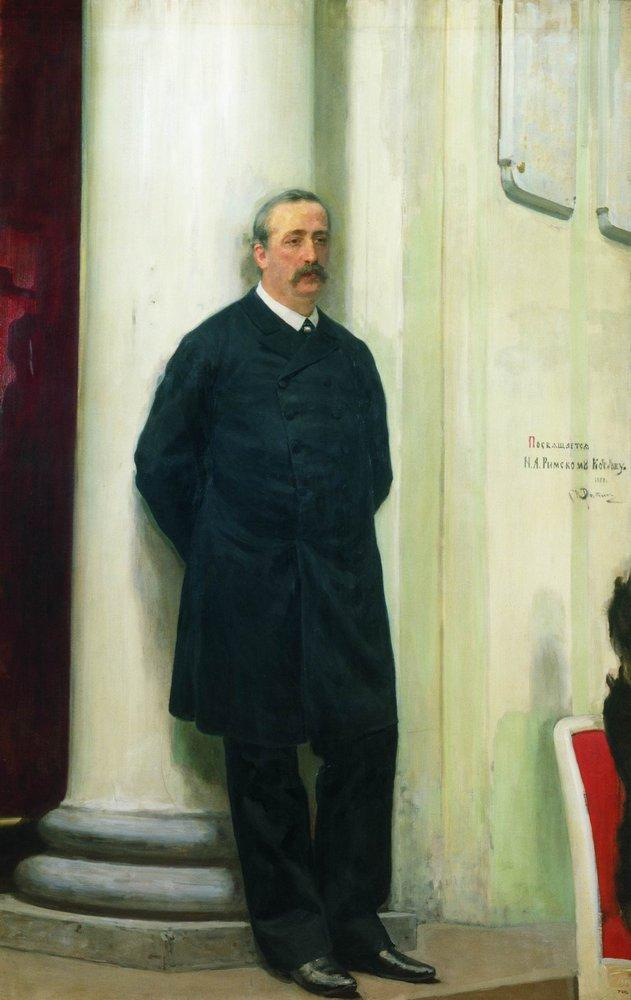
Portrait of Alexander Borodin by Ilya Repin, 1888

The Petite Suite is a suite of seven piano pieces, written by Alexander Borodin, and acknowledged as his major work for the piano. It was published in 1885, although some of the pieces had been written as far back as the late 1870s. After Borodin's death, Alexander Glazunov orchestrated the work, and added his orchestration of another of Borodin's pieces as an eighth number.

The suite was dedicated to the Belgian Countess Louise de Mercy-Argenteau, who had been instrumental in having Borodin's First Symphony performed in Verviers and Liège. She had also arranged for French translations of some of his songs and excerpts from Prince Igor; and had initiated the sponsorship of Camille Saint-Saëns and Louis-Albert Bourgault-Ducoudray for Borodin's membership of the French Society of Authors, Composers and Editors.

Borodin's original title for the work was Petit Poème d'amour d'une jeune fille ("Little poems on the love of a young girl"), but by publication time the name Petite Suite had been applied to it.

The original suite consisted of the following seven movements, with descriptions supplied by the composer:

1. Au couvent, Andante religioso, C♯ minor ("The Church's vows foster thoughts only of God")
2. Intermezzo, Tempo di minuetto, F major ("Dreaming of Society Life")
3. Mazurka I, Allegro, C major ("Thinking only of dancing")
4. Mazurka II, Allegretto, D♭ major ("Thinking both of the dance and the dancer")
5. Rêverie, Andante, D♭ major ("Thinking only of the dance")
6. Serenade, Allegretto, D♭ major ("Dreaming of love")
7. Nocturne, Andantino, G♭ major ("Lulled by the happiness of being in love”).

After Borodin's death in 1887, Alexander Glazunov orchestrated the suite but incorporated into it another piano piece by Borodin, the Scherzo in A♭ major, and slightly rearranged the order of the pieces.

1. Au couvent
2. Intermezzo
3. Mazurka I
4. Mazurka II
5. Rêverie
6. Serenade
7. Finale: Scherzo (Allegro vivace, A♭ major) – Nocturne – Scherzo
