= Heinz Hunsdiecker =

German chemist (1904–1981)

- Born: 22 January 1904; Cologne Germany
- Died: 22 October 1981 (aged 77)
- Education: University of Göttingen
- Known for: Hunsdiecker reaction
- Scientific career
- Doctoral advisor: Robert Wintgen

Heinz Hunsdiecker (22 January 1904 – 22 November 1981) was a German chemist who together with his wife Cläre Hunsdiecker (1903–1995) improved a reaction of Alexander Borodin now known as the Hunsdiecker reaction. They received both US and German patents for the work.
