= Jay Kochi =

American scientist (1927–2008)

- Born: May 17, 1927; Los Angeles, California, US
- Died: August 9, 2008 (aged 81); Houston, Texas, US
- Education: University of California, Los Angeles; Iowa State University
- Awards: Member of the National Academy of Sciences; Arthur C. Cope Scholar Award; James Flack Norris Award
- Scientific career
- Fields: Organic chemistry
- Workplaces: Harvard University; Case Western Reserve University; University of California, Berkeley; Indiana University; University of Houston
- Thesis: The application of the Hammett equation to the solvolysis of benzyl tosylates (1952)
- Doctoral advisor: George S. Hammond

Jay Kazuo Kochi (高知 和夫, Kōchi Kazuo, 1927–2008) was an American physical organometallic chemist who held lectureship at Harvard University, and faculty positions at Case Institute of Technology, 1962–1969, (now Case Western Reserve University), Indiana University, 1969 to 1984, and the University of Houston, 1984 to 2008.

== Early life and education ==
Kochi was born to Japanese immigrant parents on May 17, 1927, in Los Angeles, California, where he and his family had lived until he and his family were imprisoned at the Gila River War Relocation Center in 1942 just after the United States entered the Second World War and Executive Order 9066 was signed. After the war, Kochi and his family returned to California and Kochi later attended UCLA.

Kochi received his Bachelor of Science degree from the University of California, Los Angeles in 1949 and his Ph.D. at Iowa State University in 1952 with George S. Hammond and Henry Gilman as advisors. He then spent short stints at Harvard University, Cambridge University, Shell Development Co., Case Institute of Technology (now Case Western Reserve University), and Indiana University. For the majority of his faculty career, however, he was located at the University of Houston, where he was Welch Professor.

== Research ==
Kochi's research examined the interactions of electron donors and acceptors. One topic of his study was the nitration of benzene to give nitrobenzene. Kochi's work showed that this reaction proceeds via a complex between benzene (the donor) and nitrosonium ion (the acceptor). He also contributed to many aspects of organometallic chemistry, including the discovery of Cu, Fe, and Ag-catalyzed cross-coupling processes (which preceded the discovery of the better known Pd and Ni-catalyzed versions), as well as several metal-catalyzed oxidative processes. At the time, these results were largely ignored by the synthetic organic chemistry community. Many decades later, interest in base metal catalysis sparked significant efforts to further develop cross-coupling reactions catalyzed by metals such as Fe in particular. His research in organometallic chemistry emphasized the importance of electron-transfer processes and radical species as intermediates. Many of these results (and the results of other investigators) are summarized in a monograph.

== Awards and honors ==
Kochi received many awards for his research, including election to the U.S. National Academy of Sciences. He developed the Kochi reaction, a variation on the Hunsdiecker reaction.

== Personal life ==
Kochi was of Japanese descent and he and his family were forcibly interned at the Gila River War Relocation Center during World War II. He died at his home in Houston, Texas on August 9, 2008, after a brief illness.
