= Kochi reaction =

Type of organic reaction

Named after	Jay Kochi
Reaction type	Substitution reaction

Identifiers
Organic Chemistry Portal	kochi-reaction

The Kochi reaction is an organic reaction for the decarboxylation of carboxylic acids to alkyl halides with lead(IV) acetate and a lithium halide.

The reaction is a variation of the Hunsdiecker reaction.
