= String Quartet No. 2 (Borodin) =

1881 or 1882 musical work

String Quartet
- No. 2
- by Alexander Borodin
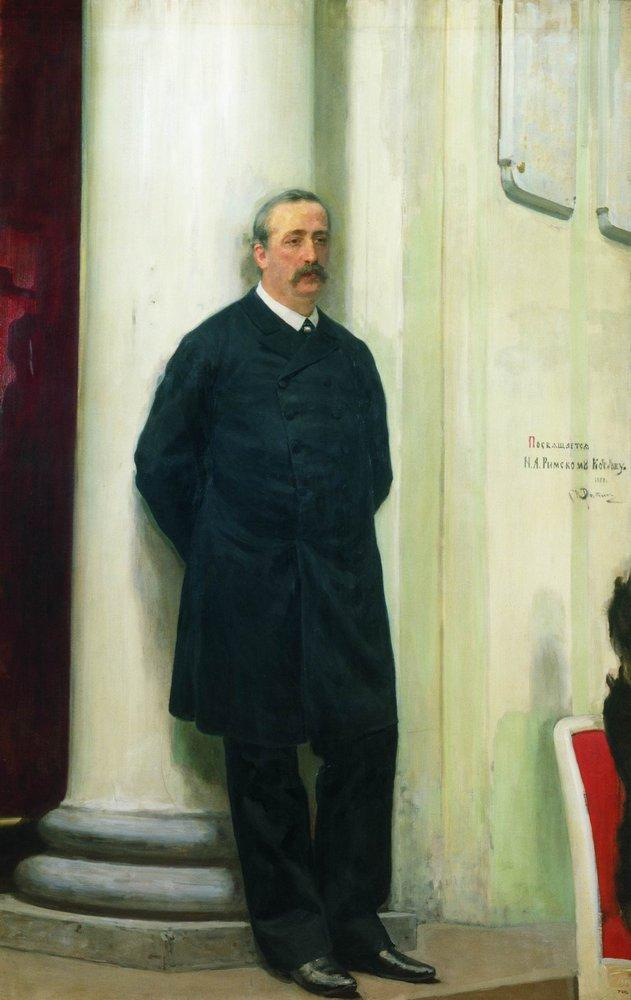
- Portrait of Alexander Borodin by Ilya Repin, 1888
- Key: D major
- Composed: 1881
- Dedication: Ekaterina Protopova, his wife
- Movements: 4

The String Quartet No. 2 is a string quartet in D major written by Alexander Borodin in 1881. It was dedicated to his wife Ekaterina Protopova. Some scholars, such as Borodin's biographer Serge Dianin, suggest that the quartet was a 20th-anniversary gift and that it has a program evoking the couple's first meeting in Heidelberg. Of its four movements, the third movement, "Notturno," is the most famous.

Borodin wrote the string quartet quickly in 1881 while staying at the estate of his friend, the composer Nikolai Lodyzhensky, which was located in Zhitovo, southeast of Moscow. Borodin also composed the symphonic poem In the Steppes of Central Asia the same year. The quartet premiered in that year or the next.

== Music ==
I. Allegro moderato

II. Scherzo: Allegro

III. Notturno: Andante

IV. Finale: Andante – Vivace
Performed by Musopen String Quartet

The string quartet has four movements:

1. Allegro moderato in D major and 2/2 time, with 304 bars;
2. Scherzo: Allegro in F major and 3/4 time, with 299 bars;
3. Notturno (Nocturne): Andante in A major and 3/4 time, with 180 bars;
4. Finale: Andante – Vivace in D major and 2/4 time, with 671 bars.

=== I. Allegro moderato ===
The first movement is written in sonata form. The principal theme of the exposition begins in measure one, with a cello singing a lyrical melody in high register.

The transition begins in measure 35, and quickly leads into the subordinate theme (measure 44) in A major, the dominant.

The subordinate theme has a complex structure, a three-part form of its own (ABA′), which leads into the closing theme in measure 86 (Animato), which concludes the exposition in measure 107. The development (beginning in measure 108) begins with the same material as the exposition, except the cello is in the low register, and the key is changed from D major to F major. After some contrapuntal work, the development reaches a dominant pedal point (measure 167), which resolves in the main key of the piece, D major, in the recapitulation in measure 180. The recapitulation follows the broad outlines of the exposition, except the subordinate theme (measure 224) begins in E-flat major instead of the expected D major. The three-part structure of the subordinate theme, though, allows Borodin to reach the expected D major in the A' part of the subordinate theme (measure 257), and the closing theme (measure 266) concludes the movement.

The first movement exemplifies Borodin's lyrical (as opposed to dramatic) treatment of the sonata form. All thematic material is lyrical; contrasts are achieved via contrapuntal writing (as in the middle section of the subordinate theme, beginning in measure 57, and especially beginning in measure 65), or color contrasts (such as changes of keys–beginning of the development, and particularly the non-traditional key of the subordinate theme in the recapitulation).

1st theme (cello)

2nd theme, part A (1st violin)

2nd theme, part B (1st violin and cello)

3rd theme

=== II. Scherzo: Allegro ===
The scherzo second movement is also in sonata form, rather than the ABA form that is more usual for scherzo-style movements. Of note also is the appearance of a scherzo as the second movement in a sonata cycle, rather than the more customary third movement. This is characteristic for Borodin, who used the same movement scheme (scherzo as a second movement) in his Second Symphony.

The principal theme of this movement (descending scale-based figure of the first violin, accompanied by a falling motive in a viola) reminds one of Mendelssohn's scherzi.

The "rising thirds" motif of the subordinate theme (measure 29) is an inversion of the viola's accompanying falling motif.

The descending scale-based figure of the subordinate theme, repeated by viola starting with measure 51, recalls the principal theme. The movement's development begins at measure 100 and emphasizes counterpoint in combining the motives of the principal and subordinate themes (measure 144). The recapitulation (measure 192) brings the subordinate theme in the main key of F (measure 221), and, after a momentary burst of activity, the movement whispers away.

The tuneful subordinate theme of this movement was freely used in the musical Kismet as the song "Baubles, Bangles, & Beads." This musical received the 1954 Tony Award.

=== III. Notturno: Andante ===
The main theme of the third movement is perhaps the most famous in the quartet. An agitated middle section, beginning in F major, followed by a series of modulations and lasting from bars 47–110 of the movement, interrupts this theme's otherwise peaceful mood. The main theme is restated after the middle section in canon (first cello and the first violin, then two violins).

=== IV. Finale: Andante – Vivace ===
The finale demonstrates Borodin's mastery of counterpoint. Written in a conventional sonata form, it opens with an introduction, which introduces the principal theme, broken into two elements: a dialogue between two violins, answered by a viola and cello. These "question–answer" motifs (one possibly being an imprecise retrograde inversion of the other) combine into the principal theme of the movement (beginning with measure 20), where the "answer" makes an accompaniment, and the "question" makes for the upper voice. The principal theme is stated as a canon, with viola, second violin, and first violin stating the theme, which modulates into the dominant, and lead into the subordinate theme in measure 90. The subordinate theme retains the frantic pace of the principal theme, to be contrasted with a more relaxed closing theme, based on the motifs of the subordinate theme, at measure 177. The development beings in a way similar to the exposition with the question–answer dialogue, except the question is now in the lower strings, and the answer in violins. After much contrapuntal work, the recapitulation begins with the now familiar question-answer motifs, this time enunciated by the combined strings (measure 371). The recapitulation proceeds as expected (with the subordinate theme in the tonic key, measure 459), only to be suddenly shifted into another key at the beginning of the coda (measure 588). But this modulation proves to be short-lived, and the coda quickly reaches the long-breathed D major close.

== Recordings ==
The Borodin Quartet in both its incarnations have specialized in this work, producing recordings of it.

The Emerson Quartet also produced a well-known recording in 1986.

The Escher String Quartet released a recording in 2018.

== In popular culture ==
Many parts of the piece were adapted into the 1953 Broadway musical Kismet

The third movement serves as the score to Disney's 2006 short The Little Matchgirl.

Excerpt of the piece played in the first episode of Star Trek: Discovery.
