= Cläre Hunsdiecker =

German chemist (1903–1995)

- Born: Cläre Dieckmann
- Education: Universität Köln
- Scientific career
- Thesis: Haemoglobin als amphoterer Elektrolyt (1928)

Cläre Hunsdiecker (née Dieckmann) (1903–1995) was a German chemist who worked with her husband Heinz Hunsdiecker (1904–1981) to improve a reaction of Alexander Borodin now known as the Hunsdiecker reaction. They received both US and German patents for the work.

== Education ==
Hunsdiecker earned her Ph.D. from the University of Cologne.
