= Robert Wintgen =

German chemist (1882–1966)

- Born: 13 June 1882; Solingen Germany
- Died: 1966 (aged 83–84)
- Education: University of Berlin
- Scientific career
- Doctoral students: Heinz Hunsdiecker

Robert Wintgen (13 June 1882 – 1966) was a German chemist. Wintgen studied at the University of Bonn and made his Ph.D with E. Rimbach at the University of Berlin.

After a post-doc position with Alfred Stock in Berlin between 1917 and 1919 he worked at the University of Göttingen together with Richard Adolf Zsigmondy. Influenced by this cooperation worked on colloids chemistry from that point on. Wintgen became professor at the newly founded University of Cologne in 1924 where he stayed until his retirement in 1950.
