= Hunsdiecker reaction =

Named reaction for synthesis of organic halides

Named after	Heinz Hunsdiecker; Cläre Hunsdiecker; Alexander Borodin
Reaction type	Substitution reaction

Identifiers
Organic Chemistry Portal	hunsdiecker-reaction
RSC ontology ID	RXNO:0000106

The Hunsdiecker reaction (also called the Borodin reaction or the Hunsdiecker–Borodin reaction) is a name reaction in organic chemistry whereby silver salts of carboxylic acids react with a halogen to produce an organic halide. It is an example of both a decarboxylation and a halogenation reaction as the product has one fewer carbon atoms than the starting material (lost as carbon dioxide) and a halogen atom is introduced its place. A catalytic approach has been developed.

== History ==
The reaction is named after Cläre Hunsdiecker and her husband Heinz Hunsdiecker, whose work in the 1930s developed it into a general method.

The reaction was first demonstrated by Alexander Borodin in 1861 in his reports of the preparation of methyl bromide (CH_{3}Br) from silver acetate (CH_{3}CO_{2}Ag).

Three decades later, Angelo Simonini, working as a student of Adolf Lieben at the University of Vienna, investigated the reactions of silver carboxylates with iodine. He found that the products formed are determined by the stoichiometry within the reaction mixture. Using a carboxylate-to-iodine ratio of 1:1 leads to an alkyl iodide product, in line with Borodin's findings and the modern understanding of the Hunsdiecker reaction. However, a 2:1 ratio favours the formation of an ester product that arises from decarboxylation of one carboxylate and coupling the resulting alkyl chain with the other.

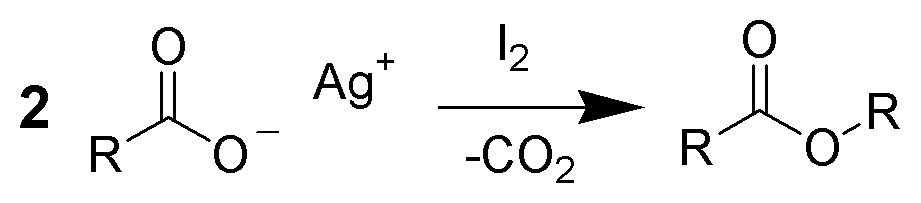

Using a 3:2 ratio of reactants leads to the formation of a 1:1 mixture of both products. These processes are sometimes known as the Simonini reaction rather than as modifications of the Hunsdiecker reaction.

3 RCOOAg + 2 I_{2} → RI + RCOOR + 2 CO_{2} + 3 AgI

== Reaction mechanism ==
In terms of reaction mechanism, the Hunsdiecker reaction is believed to involve organic radical intermediates. The silver salt 1 reacts with bromine to form the acyl hypohalite intermediate 2. Formation of the diradical pair 3 allows for radical decarboxylation to form the diradical pair 4, which recombines to form the organic halide 5. The trend in the yield of the resulting halide is primary > secondary > tertiary.

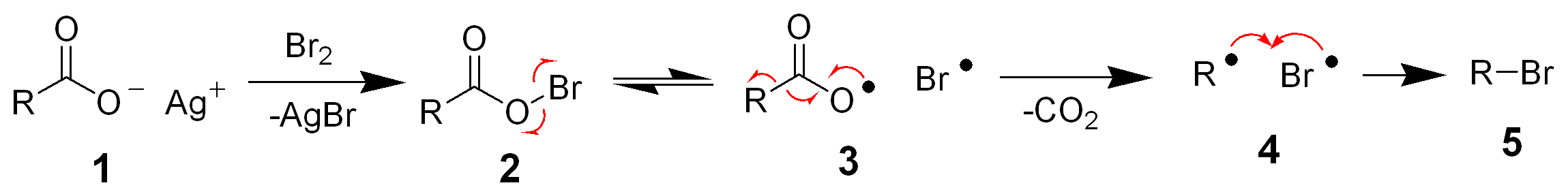

== Variations ==
The reaction cannot be performed in protic solvents, as these induce decomposition of the intermediate acetyl hypohalite.

Other counterions than silver typically have slow reaction rates. The relativistic metals mercury, thallium, and lead are preferred: inert counterions, such as the alkali metals, have only rarely led to reported success. The Kochi reaction is a variation on the Hunsdiecker reaction developed by Jay Kochi that uses lead(IV) acetate and lithium chloride (lithium bromide can also be used) to effect the halogenation and decarboxylation.

The Kochi reaction

In the presence of multiple bonds, the intermediate acetyl hypohalite prefers to add to the bond, producing an α-haloester. Steric considerations suppress this tendency in α,β-unsaturated carboxylic acids, which instead polymerize (see below).

Mercuric oxide and bromine convert 3-chlorocyclobutanecarboxylic acid to 1-bromo-3-chlorocyclobutane. This is known as Cristol-Firth modification. The 1,3-dihalocyclobutanes were key precursors to propellanes. The reaction has been applied to the preparation of ω-bromo esters with chain lengths between five and seventeen carbon atoms, with the preparation of methyl 5-bromovalerate published in Organic Syntheses as an exemplar.

Metal-free photo-Hunsdiecker reactions are also possible.

=== Reaction with α,β-unsaturated carboxylic acids ===
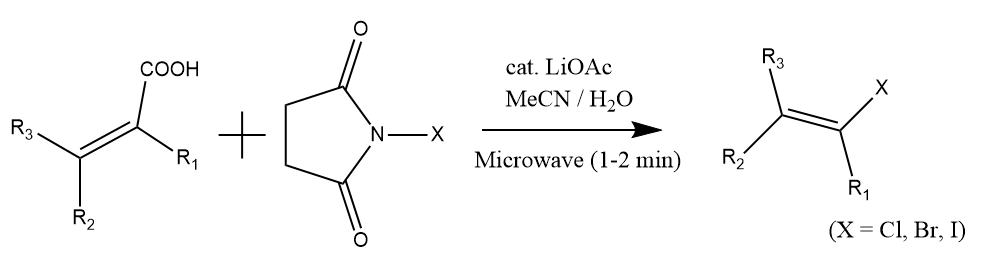
Synthesis of β-arylvinyl halide by microwave-induced Hunsdiecker reaction.

For unsaturated compounds, the radical conditions associated with the Hunsdiecker reaction can also induce polymerization instead of decarboxylation. Consequently, reactions with α,β-unsaturated carboxylic acids typically give low yield. Kuang et al have found that an alternate radical halogenating agent, N-halosuccinimide, combined with a lithium acetate catalyst, gives a higher yield of β-halostyrenes. The reaction also improves in the presence of microwave irradiation, which preferentially synthesizes (E)-β-arylvinyl halides.

For a green metal-free reaction, tetrabutylammonium trifluoroacetate serves as an alternative catalyst. However, it only exhibits comparable yields to the original lithium acetate when performed with micellular surfactants.

== See also ==
- Barton decarboxylation
- Barton–McCombie deoxygenation
