= In the Steppes of Central Asia =

Symphonic poem by Alexander Borodin

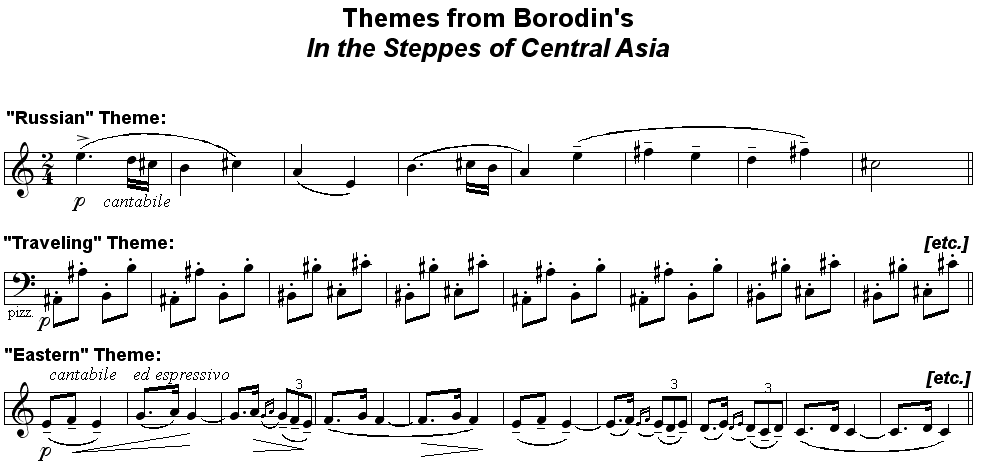
Three main themes from the composition

In the Steppes of Central Asia (7:38)

In the Steppes of Central Asia (Russian: В Средней Азии, romanized: V Sredney Azii, lit. 'In Middle Asia') is a symphonic poem (or "musical tableau") composed by Alexander Borodin in 1880, which he dedicated to Franz Liszt.

== Background ==
In the Steppes of Central Asia had been intended to be presented as one of several tableaux vivants to celebrate the silver anniversary of the reign of Emperor Alexander II of Russia, who had done much to expand the Russian Empire into the Caucasus, Far East and Central Asia. The intended production never occurred, but the work has been a concert favorite since its first performance, on 20 April 1880 (8 April Old style) in Saint Petersburg by the orchestra of the Russian Opera under the conductorship of Nikolai Rimsky-Korsakov.

== Structure ==
The work depicts an interaction between Russians and Asians in the steppe lands of Central Asia. A caravan of Central Asians is crossing the desert under the protection of Russian troops. The opening theme, representing the Russians, is heard first; after it, the strains of an ornamented eastern melody on English horn, representing the Asians. The melodies eventually combine contrapuntally. Amid these two ethnic melodies Borodin inserts a "traveling" theme in pizzicato that represents the plodding hoofs of the horses and camels. At the end, only the Russian theme is heard.

== Instrumentation ==
The piece is scored for two flutes, oboe, cor anglais, two clarinets, two bassoons, four horns in F, two trumpets in F, two trombones, bass trombone, timpani and strings.

Borodin also transcribed the piece for piano four hands.

== Composer's note ==
The composer provided the following description in a note to the score:

In the silence of the monotonous steppes of Central Asia is heard the unfamiliar sound of a peaceful Russian song. From the distance we hear the approach of horses and camels and the bizarre and melancholy notes of an oriental melody. A caravan approaches, escorted by Russian soldiers, and continues safely on its way through the immense desert. It disappears slowly. The notes of the Russian and Asiatic melodies join in a common harmony, which dies away as the caravan disappears in the distance.
