= Polovtsian Dances =

Dances from the opera Prince Igor

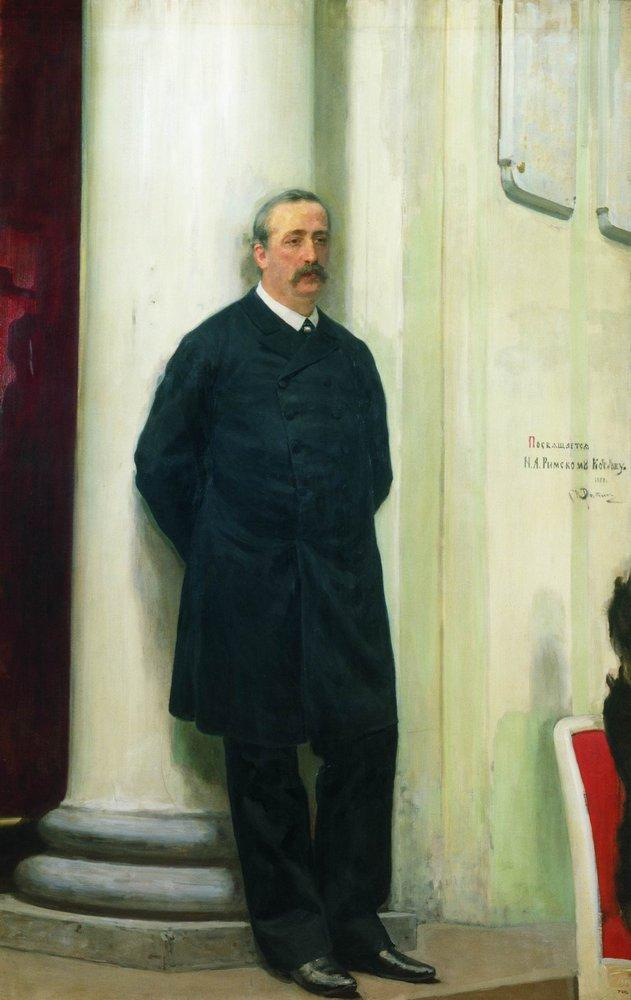
Portrait of Alexander Borodin by Ilya Repin, 1888

The Polovtsian Dances, or Polovetsian Dances (Russian: Половецкие пляски, romanized: Polovetskie plyaski), form an exotic scene at the end of act 2 of Alexander Borodin's opera Prince Igor.

The opera remained unfinished when the composer died in 1887, although he had worked on it for more than a decade. A performing version was prepared by Nikolai Rimsky-Korsakov and Alexander Glazunov in 1890. Several other versions, or "completions", of the opera have been made. The dances are performed with chorus and last between 11 and 14 minutes. They occur in act 1 or act 2, depending on which version of the opera is being used. Their music is popular and often given in concert as an orchestral showpiece, often with the choral parts omitted. The opera also has a "Polovtsian march" which opens act 3, and an overture at the start. When the dances are given in concert, a suite may be performed: Overture – "Polovtsian dances and march" from Prince Igor.

== Name ==
The name Polovtsian Dances refers to the Cumans (Polovtsy), who were nomadic invaders of Russia; the Cumans capture Igor in the opera and then entertain him with dances.

== Analysis ==
Dance No. 8
Performed in 1913 at the Berlin State Opera by the Staatskapelle Berlin

The first dance, which uses no chorus and is sometimes omitted in concerts, is No. 8, entitled "Dance of the Polovtsian Maidens" ["Пляска половецких девушек"]: presto, 6/8, F major; it is placed directly after the "Chorus of the Polovtsian Maidens" which opens the act and is followed by "Konchakovna's Cavatina".

=== Theme from No. 8 ===
Contains notable instrumental solo for clarinet.

=== No. 17, "Polovtsian Dance with Chorus" ===
The dances proper appear at the end of the act as an uninterrupted single number in several contrasting sections, as in the following list. Basic themes are identified by letters in brackets (e.g. [a]) and illustrated in the notation below the list.

No. 17, "Polovtsian Dance with Chorus"
[Половецкая пляска с хором tr. Polovetskaya plyaska s khorom]
[a] Introduction: Andantino, 4/4, A major
[b] Gliding Dance of the Maidens [Пляска девушек плавная]: Andantino, 4/4, F♯ minor
[c + a] Wild Dance of the Men [Пляска мужчин дикая]: Allegro vivo, 4/4, F major
[d] General Dance [Общая пляска]: Allegro, 3/4, D major
[e] Dance of the Boys [Пляска мальчиков] and 2nd Dance of the Men [Пляска мужчин]: Presto, 6/8, D minor
[b′ + e′] Gliding Dance of the Maidens (reprise, soon combined with the faster dancing of the boys): Moderato alla breve, 2/2, A major
[e″] Dance of the Boys and 2nd Dance of the Men (reprise): Presto, 6/8, D minor
[c′ + a″] General Dance: Allegro con spirito, 4/4, A major

Themes from No. 17

[a] Introduction: Andantino, 4/4, A major:

[b] Gliding Dance of the Maidens [Пляска девушек плавная]: Andantino, 4/4, F♯ minor:

Contains notable instrumental solos for oboe and English horn.

[c] Wild Dance of the Men [Пляска мужчин дикая]: Allegro vivo, 4/4, F major:

Contains notable instrumental solo for clarinet.

[d] General Dance [Общая пляска]: Allegro, 3/4, D major:

[e] Dance of the Boys [Пляска мальчиков] and 2nd Dance of the Men [Пляска мужчин]: Presto, 6/8, D minor:

== Lyrics ==
Text of the first stanza of this section of the opera in Cyrillic Russian, latin alphabet Russian, and English
Russian lyrics
Transliteration
English translation
Невольницы:

Улетай на крыльях ветра
Ты в край родной, родная песня наша,
Туда, где мы тебя свободно пели,
Где было так привольно нам с тобою.

Nevolnitsy:

Uletay na krylyakh vetra
Ty v kraj rodnoy, rodnaya pesnya nasha,
Tuda, gde my tebya svobodno peli,
Gde bylo tak privolno nam s toboyu.

Slavewomen:

Fly on the wings of the wind
To our native land, dear song of ours,
There, where we have sung you at liberty,
Where we felt so free in singing you.

Там, под знойным небом,
Негой воздух полон,
Там под говор моря
Дремлют горы в облаках;

Tam, pod znoynym nebom,
Negoy vozdukh polon,
Tam pod govor morya
Dremlut gory v oblakakh;

There, under the hot sky,
The air is full of bliss,
There to the sound of the sea
The mountains doze in the clouds;

Там так ярко солнце светит,
Родные горы светом заливая,
В долинах пышно розы расцветают,
И соловьи поют в лесах зеленых,
И сладкий виноград растет.

Там тебе привольней, песня,
Ты туда и улетай.

Tam tak yarko solntse svetit,
Rodnyye gory svetom zalivaya,
V dolinakh pyshno rozy rastsvetayut,
I solovyi poyut v lesakh zelyonykh,
I sladkiy vinograd rastyot.

Tam tebe privolney, pesnya,
Ty tuda i uletay.

There the sun shines so brightly,
Bathing the native mountains in light,
Splendid roses blossom in the valleys,
And nightingales sing in the green forests,
And sweet grapes grow.

You are free there, song,
Fly home.

Половцы:

Пойте песни славы хану! Пой!
Славьте силу, дочесть хана! Славь!

Славен хан! Хан!
Славен он, хан наш!

Polovtsy:

Poyte pesni slavy khanu! Poy!
Slav'te silu, dochest' khana! Slav'!

Slaven khan! Khan!
Slaven on, khan nash!

Polovtsians:

Sing songs of praise to the Khan! Sing!
Praise the power and valor of the Khan!

Praise the glorious Khan!
He is glorious, our Khan!

Блеском славы
Солнцу равен хан!
Нету равных славой хану! Нет!

Bleskom slavy
Solntsu raven khan!
Nyetu ravnykh slavoy khanu! Nyet!

In the brilliance of his glory,
The Khan is equal to the sun!
There is none equal to the Khan in glory, none!

Чаги хана славят хана.
Хана своего.

Chagi khana slavyat khana.
Khana svoyego.

The Khan women slaves praise the Khan,
Their Khan.

Translation of the remaining lyrics
Konchak [the Khan]:

Do you see the captives
From the distant sea;
Do you see my beauties,
From beyond the Caspian Sea?

Oh, tell me, friend,
Tell me just one word:
If you want to,
I will give you anyone of them.

Polovtsians:

Sing songs of praise to the Khan! Sing!
Praised be his generosity, praised be his mercy!
Praise him!

To his enemies the Khan is merciless
He, our Khan!
Who may equal the Khan in glory, who?

In the brilliance of his glory,
He is equal to the sun!
Our Khan, Khan Konchak, is equal
In glory to his forefathers!

The terrible Khan Konchak is equal
In glory to his forefathers!
Glorious is our Khan Konchak!
Glory, glory!

All the Slavs:
Repeats opening phrase.

Fly on the wings of the wind
To our native land, dear song of ours,
There, where we have sung you at liberty,
Where we felt so free in singing you.

Polovtsians:

Our Khan, Khan Konchak, is equal
In glory to his forefathers!

The grim Khan Konchak is equal
In glory to his forefathers!
Glory, glory to Khan Konchak!
Khan Konchak!

With your dancing entertain the Khan,
Dance to entertain the Khan, slaves!
Your Khan!
Dance to entertain the Khan, slaves!
Your Khan!

With your dancing entertain the Khan!
Entertain with dancing!
Our Khan Konchak!

== Ballets Russes performances ==
As part of his first Saison Russe at the Théâtre du Châtelet in Paris, Sergei Diaghilev presented Polovtsian Scenes and Dances, consisting of act 2 of Prince Igor, with full orchestra and singers. The premiere took place on 18 May 1909. The choreography was by Michel Fokine and the sets and costumes were designed by Nicholas Roerich. In later seasons, without singers, the work was given as The Polovtsian Dances. For the 1923 season, it was partly re-choreographed by Bronislava Nijinska.

In 1971, the ballet was presented by choreographer Igor Moiseyev in the USSR Folk Dance Ensemble (Одноактный балет "Половецкие пляски". Балет Игоря Моисеева). It was premiered at the Palais des Sports at the Porte de Versailles in Paris; in Moscow, in the Tchaikovsky Concert Hall, in Leningrad and other cities of the USSR. The ballet was filmed.

== In popular culture ==
Themes from the Polovtsian Dances have been used widely in popular culture. The 1953 musical Kismet is mostly adapted from Borodin's music, including these dances. The most prominent example is the popular standard "Stranger in Paradise," adapted from the "Gliding Dance of the Maidens".

An arranged version of the song is featured in the 2005 Konami video game The Sword of Etheria for the PlayStation 2, with vocals by Martha Matsuda. Konami also included this version of the song in Dance Dance Revolution Extreme 2.

In The Simpsons episode "Little Big Girl", an instrumental version of the song can briefly be heard during Bart's dream sequence.

The song was performed at the 2010 Winter Olympics closing ceremony during the handover segment to Sochi, Russia. Russian mezzo-soprano Maria Guleghina sang an excerpt of the piece. Four years later, it was again performed during the 2014 Winter Olympics opening ceremony, this time in its entirety.

In The Amazing Digital Circus episode "Beach Episode", when the main characters are escaping from the Digital Circus, an instrumental of the piece is heard.
