= Prince Igor =

Opera by Alexander Borodin

- Opera by Alexander Borodin
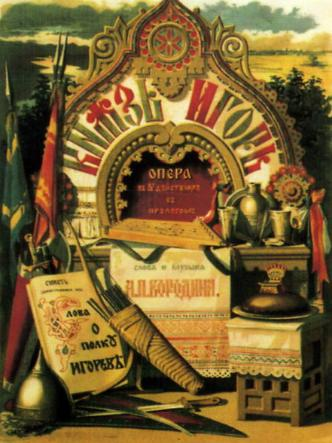
- Title page of the published score. The text reads: "Prince Igor, opera in 4 acts with a prologue, words and music by A.P. Borodin, subject adapted from The Lay of Igor's Host."
- Native title: Russian: Князь Игорь, romanized: Knyaz' Igor'
- Librettist: Borodin
- Language: Russian
- Based on: The Lay of Igor's Host
- Premiere: 4 November 1890; Mariinsky Theatre, Saint Petersburg

Prince Igor (Russian: Князь Игорь, romanized: Knyaz Igor,) is an opera in four acts with a prologue, written and composed by Alexander Borodin.

The composer adapted the libretto from the early Russian epic The Lay of Igor's Host, which recounts the campaign of the 12th-century prince Igor Svyatoslavich against the invading Cuman ("Polovtsian") tribes in 1185. He also incorporated material drawn from two medieval Kievan chronicles. The opera was left unfinished upon the composer's death in 1887 and was edited and completed by Nikolai Rimsky-Korsakov and Alexander Glazunov. It was first performed in St. Petersburg, Russia, in 1890.

== Composition history ==
=== Original composition: 1869–1887 ===
After briefly considering Lev Mei's The Tsar's Bride as a subject (later taken up in 1898 by Nikolai Rimsky-Korsakov, his 9th opera), Borodin began looking for a new project for his first opera. Vladimir Stasov, critic and advisor to The Mighty Handful, suggested The Lay of Igor's Host, a 12th century epic prose poem, and sent Borodin a scenario for a three-act opera on 30 April 1869. Initially, Borodin found the proposition intriguing, but daunting:

Your outline is so complete that everything seems clear to me and suits me perfectly. But will I manage to carry out my own task to the end? Bah! As they say here, 'He who is afraid of the wolf doesn't go into the woods!' So I shall give it a try ...

— Alexander Borodin, reply to Stasov's proposal

After collecting material from literary sources, Borodin began composition in September 1869 with initial versions of Yaroslavna's arioso and Konchakovna's cavatina, and sketched the Polovtsian Dances and March of the Polovtsy. He soon began to have doubts and ceased composing. He expressed his misgivings in a letter to his wife: "There is too little drama here, and no movement ... To me, opera without drama, in the strict sense, is unnatural." This began a period of about four years in which he proceeded no further on Prince Igor, but began diverting materials for the opera into his other works, the Symphony No. 2 in B minor (1869–1876) and the collaborative opera-ballet Mlada (1872).

The Mlada project was soon aborted, and Borodin, like the other members of The Mighty Handful who were involved – César Cui, Modest Mussorgsky, and Rimsky-Korsakov – thought about ways to recycle the music he contributed. Of the eight numbers he had composed for Act 4 of Mlada, those that eventually found their way into (or back into) Prince Igor included No. 1 (Prologue: The opening C major chorus), No. 2 (material for Yaroslavna's arioso and Igor's aria), No. 3 (Prologue: The eclipse), No. 4 (Act 3: The trio), and No. 8 (Act 4: The closing chorus).

Borodin returned to Prince Igor in 1874, inspired by the success of his colleagues Rimsky-Korsakov and Mussorgsky in the staging of their historical operas, The Maid of Pskov (1873) and Boris Godunov (1874). This period also marks the creation of two new characters, the deserters Skula and Yeroshka, who have much in common with the rogue monks Varlaam and Misail in Boris Godunov.

In his memoirs, Rimsky-Korsakov mentions an 1876 concert at which Borodin's "closing chorus" was performed, the first public performance of any music from Prince Igor identified by him:

... Borodin's closing chorus ["Glory to the beautiful Sun"] ..., which, in the epilogue of the opera (subsequently removed) extolled Igor's exploits, was shifted by the author himself to the prologue of the opera, of which it now forms a part. At present this chorus extolls Igor as he starts on his expedition against the Polovtsy. The episodes of the solar eclipse, of the parting from Yaroslavna, etc., divide it into halves which fringe the entire prologue. In those days this whole middle part was non-existent, and the chorus formed one unbroken number of rather considerable dimensions.

— Nikolai Rimsky-Korsakov, Chronicle of My Musical Life, 1909

The idea of a choral epilogue in the original scenario was no doubt inspired by the example of A Life for the Tsar by Mikhail Glinka, to whose memory Prince Igor is dedicated.

Borodin's primary occupation was chemistry, including research and teaching. However, he also spent much time in support of women's causes, much to the consternation of his fellow composers, who felt he should devote his time and talent to music. In 1876, a frustrated Stasov gave up hope that Borodin would ever finish Prince Igor, and offered his scenario to Rimsky-Korsakov. Rimsky-Korsakov instead assisted Borodin in orchestrating important numbers in preparation for concert performance; for example, the Polovtsian Dances in 1879:

There was no end of waiting for the orchestration of the Polovtsian Dances, and yet they had been announced and rehearsed by me with the chorus. It was high time to copy out the parts. In despair I heaped reproaches on Borodin. He, too, was none too happy. At last, giving up all hope, I offered to help him with the orchestration. Thereupon he came to my house in the evening, bringing with him the hardly touched score of the Polovtsian Dances; and the three of us—he, Anatoly Lyadov, and I – took it apart and began to score it in hot haste. To gain time, we wrote in pencil and not in ink. Thus we sat at work until late at night. The finished sheets of the score Borodin covered with liquid gelatine, to keep our pencil marks intact; and in order to have the sheets dry the sooner, he hung them out like washing on lines in my study. Thus the number was ready and passed on to the copyist. The orchestration of the closing chorus I did almost single-handed ..."

— Nikolai Rimsky-Korsakov, Chronicle of My Musical Life, 1909

Borodin worked on Prince Igor, off and on, for almost 18 years.

=== Posthumous completion and orchestration: 1887–1888 ===
Borodin died suddenly in 1887, leaving Prince Igor incomplete. Rimsky-Korsakov and Stasov went to Borodin's home, collected his scores, and brought them to Rimsky-Korsakov's house.

Glazunov and I together sorted all the manuscripts ... In the first place there was the unfinished Prince Igor. Certain numbers of the opera, such as the first chorus, the dance of the Polovtsy, Yaroslavna's Lament, the recitative and song of Vladimir Galitsky, Konchak's aria, the arias of Konchakovna and Prince Vladimir Igorevich, as well as the closing chorus, had been finished and orchestrated by the composer. Much else existed in the form of finished piano sketches; all the rest was in fragmentary rough draft only, while a good deal simply did not exist. For Acts II and III (in the camp of the Polovtsy) there was no adequate libretto – no scenario, even – there were only scattered verses and musical sketches, or finished numbers that showed no connection between them. The synopsis of these acts I knew full well from talks and discussions with Borodin, although in his projects he had been changing a great deal, striking things out and putting them back again. The smallest bulk of composed music proved to be in Act III. Glazunov and I settled the matter as follows between us: He was to fill in all the gaps in Act III and write down from memory the Overture played so often by the composer, while I was to orchestrate, finish composing, and systematize all the rest that had been left unfinished and unorchestrated by Borodin.

— Nikolai Rimsky-Korsakov, Chronicle of My Musical Life, 1909

The often-repeated account that Glazunov reconstructed and orchestrated the overture from memory after hearing the composer play it at the piano is true only in part. The following statement by Glazunov himself clarifies the matter:

The overture was composed by me roughly according to Borodin's plan. I took the themes from the corresponding numbers of the opera and was fortunate enough to find the canonic ending of the second subject among the composer's sketches. I slightly altered the fanfares for the overture ... The bass progression in the middle I found noted down on a scrap of paper, and the combination of the two themes (Igor's aria and a phrase from the trio) was also discovered among the composer's papers. A few bars at the very end were composed by me.

— Alexander Glazunov, memoir, 1891, published in the Russkaya muzikalnaya gazeta, 1896

== Musical analysis ==
Central to the opera is the way the Russians are distinguished from the Polovtsians through melodic characterization. While Borodin uses features of Russian folk music to represent his compatriots, he uses chromaticism, melismas and appoggiaturas—among other techniques—represent their 'heathen' opponents. These methods had already been used by Glinka and others to portray Orientalism in Russian music.

== Performance history ==
"During the season of 1888–9 the Directorate of Imperial Theatres began to lead us a fine dance with the production of Prince Igor, which had been finished, published, and forwarded to the proper authorities. We were led by the nose the following season as well, with constant postponements of production for some reason or other." "On October 23, 1890, Prince Igor was produced at last, rehearsed fairly well by K. A. Kuchera, as Nápravník had declined the honor of conducting Borodin's opera. Both Glazunov and I were pleased with our orchestration and additions. The cuts later introduced by the Directorate in Act 3 of the opera did it considerable harm. The unscrupulousness of the Mariinsky Theatre subsequently went to the length of omitting Act 3 altogether. Taken all in all, the opera was a success and attracted ardent admirers, particularly among the younger generation."

— Nikolai Rimsky-Korsakov, Chronicle of My Musical Life, 1909

The world premiere was given in St. Petersburg on 4 November (23 October O.S.), 1890 at the Mariinsky Theatre. Set designers were Yanov, Andreyev, and Bocharov, while Lev Ivanov was balletmaster. Moscow premieres followed in 1892 by the Russian Opera Society, conducted by Iosif Pribik. The Bolshoi Theatre premiere was given in 1898 and was conducted by Ulrikh Avranek

Other notable premieres were given in Prague in 1899 and in Paris in 1909, with a Sergei Diaghilev production featuring Feodor Chaliapin as Galitsky and Maria Nikolaevna Kuznetsova as Yaroslavna. Ivanov's choreography was revived by Mikhail Fokin (and in that form can be seen in the 1969 film. London saw the same production in 1914 conducted by Thomas Beecham, again with Chaliapin as Galitsky. In 1915 the United States premiere took place at the Metropolitan Opera, staged in Italian and conducted by Giorgio Polacco. The first performance in English was at Covent Garden on 26 July 1919, with Miriam Licette as Yaroslavna.

In January and February 2009 there was a production at the Aalto Theatre by the Essen Opera. While some aspects of the production may have been unusual, one critic noted that "placing the (Polovtsian) Dances as a Finale is an elegant idea, ... the director Andrejs Zagars and the conductor Noam Zur have thus presented a musically and dramaturgically coherent Prince Igor. Heartfelt applause for a worthwhile evening at the opera."

In 2011 there was a concert performance in Moscow by Helikon Opera, based on Pavel Lamm's reconstruction. A new edition based on 92 surviving manuscripts by Borodin was completed by musicologist Anna Bulycheva and published in 2012.

In 2014, the Metropolitan Opera in New York City staged a reconceived version, sung in Russian for the first time there. Director Dmitri Tcherniakov and conductor Gianandrea Noseda removed most of the melodies contributed by Rimsky-Korsakov and Glazunov, although they retained those composers' orchestrations. They added many fragments by Borodin that Rimsky-Korsakov and Glazunov had omitted, basing their work on many decades of musicological research. They rearranged the order in which some of the material appeared, in some cases taking account of notes left by Borodin. The overall conception made the opera more of a psychological drama about Prince Igor and his state of mind, given the deep depression he went into following his soldiers' loss to the Polovtsians. The entire opera was reordered: after the prologue, in which the solar eclipse was taken as a bad omen, Act 1 presented a dream sequence dealing with the relation of Igor and his son with the Polovtsian general and his daughter in the Polovtsian camp. The second act largely dealt with the antics of Prince Galitsky in Putivyl and ended with the destruction of the city. The third act ended with Prince Igor coming out of his depression to begin the rebuilding of the destroyed city. This production starred Russian bass Ildar Abdrazakov in the title role with Ukrainian soprano Oksana Dyka as Yaroslavna. The performances in New York included a worldwide HD broadcast. The production was jointly produced with De Nederlandse Opera of Amsterdam.

At the beginning of the Opening Ceremony of the Winter Olympics in Sochi, Russia, in February 2014, some of Borodin's music from this opera was played while an eclipsed sun, crescent-shaped, drifted across the upper levels of the center of the stadium, showing the basis of Russian history in the Prince Igor story.

== Publication history ==
- 1885, three arias, piano-vocal score, edition by Borodin, W. W. Bessel, St. Petersburg
- 1888, piano-vocal score, edition by Rimsky-Korsakov & Glazunov, M. P. Belyayev, Leipzig
- 1888, full score, edition by Rimsky-Korsakov & Glazunov, M. P. Belyayev, Leipzig
- 1953, piano-vocal score, edition by Rimsky-Korsakov & Glazunov, Muzgiz, Moscow
- 1954, full score, edition by Rimsky-Korsakov & Glazunov, Muzgiz, Moscow
- 2012, piano-vocal score, the original version, edited by Bulycheva, Classica-XXI, Moscow

== Roles ==
Role	Voice type	St. Petersburg premiere, 4 November (23 October O.S.) 1890, (Conductor: Karl Kuchera)	Moscow premiere, 1892 (Conductor: –)	Bolshoi Theatre, Moscow, 1898 (Conductor: – )
Igor Svyatoslavich, Prince of Novgorod-Seversky	baritone	Ivan Melnikov	Ivan Goncharov	Pavel Khokhlov
Yaroslavna, his wife by his second marriage	soprano	Olga Olgina	Yelena Tsvetkova	Mariya Deysha-Sionitskaya
Vladimir Igorevich, Igor's son from his first marriage	tenor	Mikhail Dmitrievich Vasilyev	Mikhaylov	Leonid Sobinov
Galitsky (Vladimir Yaroslavich), Prince of Galich, brother of Princess Yaroslavna	listed as "high bass"			Stepan Vlasov
Konchak, Polovtsian khan	bass	Mikhail Koryakin	Aleksandr Antonovsky	Stepan Trezvinsky
Gzak, Polovtsian khan	silent			
Konchakovna, daughter of Khan Konchak	contralto	Mariya Slavina		Azerskaya
Ovlur, a Christian Polovtsian	tenor			Uspensky
Skula, a gudok-player	bass	Fyodor Stravinsky		Vasiliy Tyutyunnik
Yeroshka, a gudok-player	tenor	Grigoriy Ugrinovich		Konstantin Mikhaylov-Stoyan
Yaroslavna's nurse	mezzo-soprano			
A Polovtsian maiden	mezzo-soprano	Dolina		
Chorus, silent roles: Russian princes and princesses, boyars and boyarynas, elders, Russian warriors, maidens, people, Polovtsian khans, Konchakovna's girlfriends, slaves of Khan Konchak, Russian prisoners, Polovtsian sentries

Note:

- The actual given name of the historical Yaroslavna is Yefrosinya (Russian: Ефросинья, English: Euphrosina). Yaroslavna is a patronymic, meaning "daughter of Yaroslav". Konchakovna's name is similarly derived.
- Yaroslavna's brother, Vladimir Yaroslavich, is often called "Prince Galitsky" (Russian: Князь Галицкий), leading to the misconception that he was a prince by the name of Galitsky. In fact, he was a son of Prince of Galich Yaroslav Osmomysl. Prince Galitsky is a title meaning "Prince of Galich".

== Synopsis ==
Time: The year 1185

Place: The city of Putivl (prologue, Acts 1 and 4); a Polovtsian camp (Acts 2 and 3)

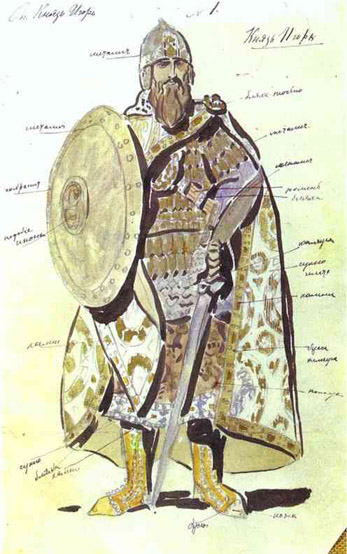
Konstantin Korovin's costume design for Igor in the production of Prince Igor at the Mariinsky Theatre, 1909

Note: As discussed in this article, Borodin's final decision on the order of the first two acts is unclear. The traditional grouping presented here is that of the Rimsky-Korsakov-Glazunov edition. In many productions, Act 3 is omitted.

=== Prologue ===
The cathedral square in Putivl

Prince Igor is about to set out on a campaign against the Cumans/Polovtsy and their Khans who have previously attacked the Russian lands. The people sing his praise and that of his son, the other leaders and the army (Chorus: "Glory to the beautiful Sun"). A solar eclipse takes place to general consternation. Two soldiers Skula and Yeroshka desert feeling sure that Vladimir Yaroslavich, Prince Galitsky, will offer them work more to their liking. Although Yaroslavna, Igor's wife, takes the eclipse for a bad omen, Igor insists that honour demands that he go to war. He leaves her to the care of her brother, Prince Galitsky, who tells of his gratitude to Igor for sheltering him after he was banished from his own home by his father and brothers. The people sing a great chorus of praise (Chorus: "Glory to the multitude of stars") as the host sets out on their campaign against the Polovtsy.

=== Act 1 ===
Scene 1: Vladimir Galitsky's court in Putivl

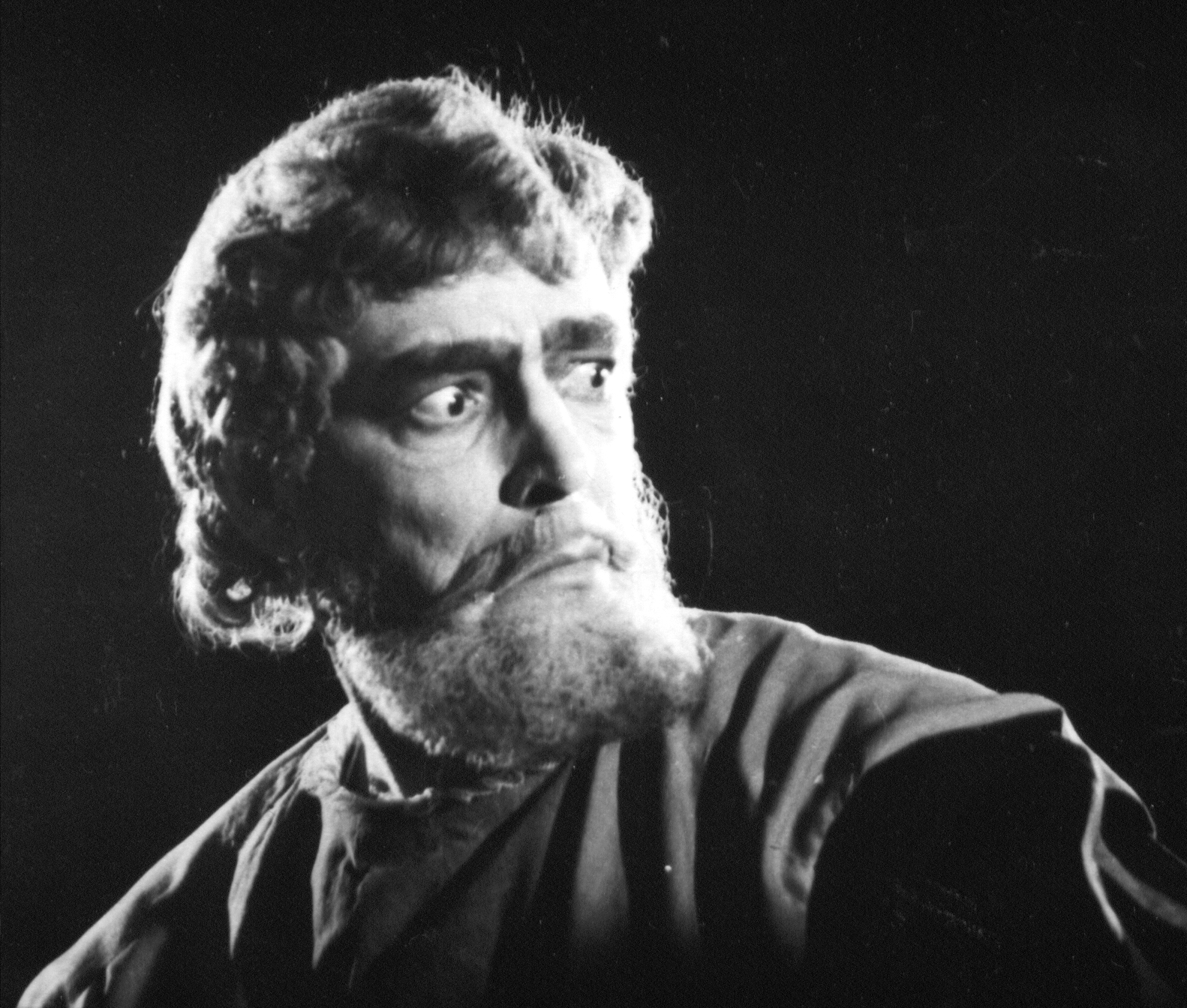
G. Petrov as Galitsky (1970)

Aria of Galitsky from Prince Igor (2:38)
Aria of Galitsky from opera "Prince Igor" A. Borodin. Performed by Georgiy Petrov 1970

Galitsky's followers sing his praise. Skula and Yeroshka are now working as gudok-players. They entertain the followers and all sing of how Galitsky and his men abducted a young woman and how she pleaded to be allowed to return to her father without being dishonoured. The prince arrives and sings of how, if he were Prince of Putivl, he would drink and feast all day while dispensing judgment and have the prettiest maidens with him all night (Galitsky's Song). The treasury would be spent on himself and his men while his sister would be praying in a monastery. A group of young women beg the prince to restore their abducted friend. He threatens them and drives them away, saying how she now lives in luxury in his quarters and does not have to work. The prince returns to his rooms having sent for wine for his followers. The gudok players and the prince's followers mock the women. They wonder what might happen if Yaroslavna hears of what happens, but then realise she would be helpless with all her men gone to war. They sing of how they are all drunkards and are supported by Galitsky. The men decide to go to the town square to declare Galitsky the Prince of Putivl, leaving just the two drunk musicians behind.

Scene 2: A room in Yaroslavna's palace

Yaroslavna is alone worrying about why she has not heard from Igor and his companions (Yaroslavna's Arioso). She sings of her tearful nights and nightmares and reminisces about when she was happy with Igor by her side. The nurse brings in the young women who tell Yaroslavna of their abducted friend. They are reluctant at first to reveal the culprit but eventually name Galitsky and talk of how he and his drunken followers cause trouble around Putivl. Galitsky enters and the women run away. Yaroslavna questions him as to the truth of their story and he mocks her saying she should treat him as a guest in her house. She threatens him with what Igor will do on his return, but Galitsky replies that he can seize the throne whenever he wants. Yaroslavna accuses him of repeating the betrayal that he carried out against their father, but he replies that he was only joking and asks if she has a lover now her husband is away. She threatens him with sending him back to their father. He replies that he will return the girl but will take another later and leaves. The council of boyars arrive to inform Yaroslavna that the Polovtsy under Khan Gzak are about to attack Putivl. Igor's army has been utterly destroyed and he has been wounded and captured with his son and brother. After a moment of faintness, Yaroslavna orders messengers sent to the city's allies, but the Boyars report that the roads are cut, some towns are in revolt and their princes will be captured. The Boyars say that they will organise the defence but Galitsky returns with his followers to demand that a new Prince be chosen. His retinue say it should be him as he is Yaroslavna's brother and Igor's brother-in-law. The boyars refuse. The argument is interrupted by the sight of flames and the sound of crying women. Some of the boyars flee; some join the battle, others guard the Princess. They call the attack God's judgment.

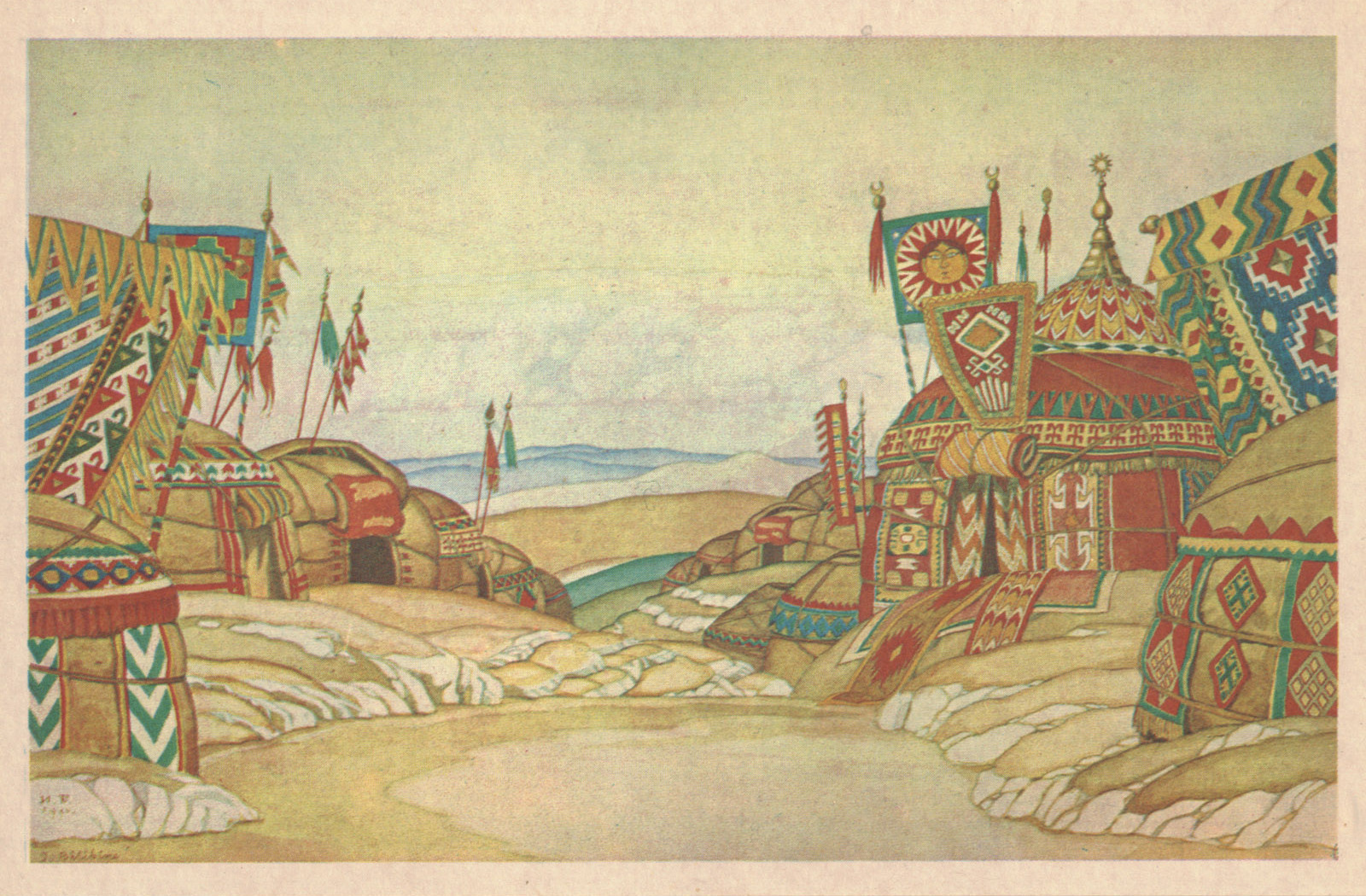
Scene design by Ivan Bilibin (1930)

=== Act 2 ===
Evening in the Polovtsian Camp

Polovtsian maidens sing comparing love to a flower that droops in the heat of the day and is revived by night. They dance together (Dance of the Polovtsian Maidens). Konchakovna joins in the singing hoping that her own lover will join her soon (Konchakovna's Cavatina). The Russian prisoners arrive from their day's work and express their gratitude when fed by Konchakovna and the maidens. Their guards retire for the night leaving just Ovlur, a Christian, in charge. Vladimir, son of Igor, sings of his hope that his love will soon join him now that the day is fading (Vladimir's Cavatina). His love is Konchakovna. She comes and the two sing of their love and their desire to marry (Love Duet). While her father will consent to the marriage, they know that his will not. They part when they hear Igor coming. He sings of his disgrace and torment at being captured with his followers dead (Prince Igor's Aria). Only his wife, he feels, will be loyal. He hopes for the chance to regain his honour. Ovlur urges Igor to escape and the prince agrees to think about it. Khan Konchak asks him if all is well (Konchak's Aria) and he replies that the falcon cannot live in captivity. Konchak says that as Igor did not ask for mercy he is not a prisoner but an honoured guest equal to a Khan. Igor reminds him that he too knows what it is to be a captive. Konchak offers Igor freedom if he will promise not to wage war on him again, but he refuses saying he cannot lie. Konchak regrets that they were not born to be allies. They would then have captured all of Russia. He summons the Polovtsian slaves to entertain Igor and himself and offers Igor his choice of them. As the slaves dance the Polovtsy sing of Konchak's glory (Polovtsian Dances).

=== Act 3 ===
The Polovtsian camp

March
Recorded in 1913 at the Berlin State Opera. (3:58)

The Polovtsian army returns in triumph singing the praise of Khan Gzak (Polovtsian March). Konchak sings of the sack of Putivl and other victories and confidently predicts that they will soon capture all of Russia. Igor and his son Vladimir have their worst fears confirmed by the new captives. Vladimir and the other prisoners urge Igor to escape, but he is at first reluctant, singing of his shame and saying that it is the duty of the other Russian princes to save the homeland (Igor's Monologue, Mariinsky edition only). Ovlur now arrives to say that he has prepared horses for Igor and Vladimir and Igor now agrees to escape. The distressed Konchakovna comes, challenging Vladimir to show his love by either taking her with him or by staying. Igor urges his son to come, but Vladimir feels unable to leave Konchakovna who threatens to wake the camp. Eventually Igor flees alone and Konchakovna sounds the alarm. She and her father refuse to let the Polovtsy kill Vladimir. Instead Konchak orders the death of the guards and marries Vladimir to his daughter. As for Igor, Konchak thinks more of him for his escape.

=== Act 4 ===
Dawn in Putivl

Yaroslavna weeps at her separation from Igor and the defeat of his army, blaming the very elements themselves for helping the enemy (Yaroslavna's Lament). Peasant women blame not the wind but Khan Gzak for the devastation. As Yaroslavna looks around to acknowledge the destruction, she sees two riders in the distance who turn out to be Igor and Ovlur. The two lovers sing of their joy of being reunited and of the expectation that Igor will lead the Russians to victory against the Khan. Unaware of Igor's return, Skula and Yeroshka, the drunken gudok players, sing a song that mocks him. Then they notice him in the distance. After a moment of panic about what will happen to them, Skula says that they should rely on their cunning and decides on a plan that will save them. They ring the church bells to summon a crowd. Although people at first treat them with suspicion, the gudok players manage to convince the crowd that Igor has returned and the boyars that they are loyal followers of the true prince and not Galitsky. All joyously celebrate Igor's return.

== Principal arias and numbers ==
Overture

Prologue

Chorus: "Glory to the beautiful Sun", «Солнцу красному слава!» (People of Putivl)
Chorus: "Glory to the multitude of stars", «Частым звёздочкам слава!» (People of Putivl)

Act 1

Song: "If only I had the honor", «Только б мне дождаться чести» (Galitsky)
Arioso: "A long time has passed", «Немало времени прошло с тех пор» (Yaroslavna)

Act 2

Dance: "Dance of the Polovtsian Maidens", «Пляска половецких девушек» (Orchestra)
Cavatina: "The light of day fades", «Меркнет свет дневной» (Konchakovna)
Cavatina: "Slowly the day died away", «Медленно день угасал» (Vladimir)
Duet: "Is that you, my Vladimir?", «Ты ли, Владимир мой?» (Konchakovna, Vladimir)
Aria: "No sleep, no rest for my tormented soul", «Ни сна, ни отдыха измученной душе» (Igor)
Aria: "Are you well, Prince?", «Здоров ли, князь?» (Konchak)
Polovtsian Dances: "Fly away on the wings of the wind", «Улетай на крыльях ветра» (Slaves, Konchak)

Act 3

March: "Polovtsian March", «Половецкий марш» (Orchestra)
Trio: "Vladimir! Is all this really true?", «Владимир! Ужель все это правда?» (Konchakovna, Vladimir, Igor)

Act 4

Aria: "Oh, I weep", «Ах, плачу я» (Yaroslavna)
Chorus: "God heard our prayers", «Знать, господь мольбы услышал» (People of Putivl)

Both the Overture to Prince Igor and the "Polovtsian Dances" (from Act II) are well-known concert standards. Together with the "Polovtsian March", they form the so-called "suite" from the opera.

== Critical analysis ==
Prince Igor is a staple of Russian opera, but has not travelled well abroad. One obvious reason is the Russian language, although translation into Italian was once a solution.

Another explanation for the failure to gain acceptance is its lack of unity resulting from its unfinished state. Despite the skill and efforts of editors Rimsky-Korsakov and Glazunov, the opera is still episodic and dramatically static, a problem of which the composer himself was aware when he embarked on composition (see quote above in "Composition History"). This is partly a consequence of Borodin's failure to complete a libretto before beginning composition of the music—the same problem that plagued his colleague Mussorgsky in the composition of Khovanshchina. Both composers wrote their librettos piece by piece while composing the music, both lost sight of the overall narrative thread of their operas, and both wound up with pages and pages of music that needed to be sacrificed to assemble a cohesive whole. Also, both died before finishing their operas, leaving the task of completion, editing, and orchestration in both cases to Rimsky-Korsakov.

== Performance practice ==
One of the main considerations when performing Prince Igor is the question of whether to include Act 3, much of which was composed by Glazunov. The practice of omitting it was mentioned as early as 1909 in Rimsky-Korsakov's memoirs. Many productions leave Act 3 out because it "fails to carry conviction both musically and dramatically." On the other hand, maintaining the act has certain benefits. It contains some fine pages (e.g., the "Polovtsian March"), provides an important link in the narrative (Igor's escape, Vladimir's fate), and is the origin of some of the memorable themes first heard in the overture (the trio, brass fanfares). Fortunately, the option of omitting the fine overture, also known to have been composed by Glazunov, is seldom considered.

Recently, the question of the best sequence of scenes in which to perform the opera has gained some prominence. Borodin did not complete a libretto before composing the music to Prince Igor. The opera has traditionally been performed in the edition made by Rimsky-Korsakov and Glazunov. It will be obvious that the positions to which they assigned the Prologue, Act 3, and Act 4 cannot be changed if the story is to make sense. However, because the events of Act 1 and Act 2 overlap and are independent of one another, Act 2 may just as well precede Act 1 without any loss of coherence. Soviet musicologists Pavel Lamm and Arnold Sokhor reported the existence of a written plan (now in Glinka's Musical Culture Museum, Moscow), in Borodin's hand, that specified this sequence of scenes:

1. The omen from heaven (Prologue)
2. Imprisonment (Act 2)
3. Galitsky's court (Act 1, Scene 1)
4. Yaroslavna's palace (Act 1, Scene 2)
5. Escape (Act 3)
6. Return (Act 4)

Sokhor assessed the plan as not written later than 1883. The 1993 recording of Prince Igor by Valery Gergiev with the Kirov Opera features a new edition of the score with additions commissioned from composer Yuri Falik for a production at the Mariinsky Theatre, adopting this hypothetical original sequence. The authors of the notes to the recording assert that this order better balances the musical structure of the score by alternating the acts in the Russian and Polovtsian settings with their distinctive musical atmospheres.

Despite this justification, there is reason to maintain the traditional sequence. Act II contains most of the numbers for which the work is known today, with Igor's brooding and impassioned aria ("Oh give me freedom") at the center, flanked by Vladimir's cavatina and Konchak's aria, not to mention the rousing conclusion provided by the Polovtsian Dances. Moving its wealth of arias and dances from the center of the work to near the beginning may weaken the opera's structure.

The "Mariinsky edition" makes other important changes and additions to the score. Although much of the material composed or orchestrated by Glazunov and Rimsky-Korsakov is retained, there are additions culled from the unpublished vocal score by Pavel Lamm, orchestrated and linked by Falik. The changes include:

- About 200 bars added to the scene in Yaroslavna's palace which make explicit Galitsky's rebellion
- Various additions and removals from Act 3, including the restoration of a monologue for Igor composed by Borodin in 1875. A review in Gramophone highlights how the newly added monologue "helps to give a weighty focus to Act 3, otherwise a phenomenal feat of reconstruction on Glazunov's part, but somehow insubstantial".
- A different final chorus for Act 4, "Glory to the multitude of stars", a repeat of material from the Prologue. This idea is historically justified, as Borodin had originally placed this chorus at the end of the opera in the form of an epilogue [see the quote by Rimsky-Korsakov above under Composition history]. This regrettably necessitates the elimination of Borodin's subsequent chorus, "God heard our prayers".

Outside Russia, the opera has often been given in languages other than Russian. For example, the 1960 recording under Lovro von Matačić is sung in German, the 1964 recording under Armando La Rosa Parodi is in Italian and the 1982 radio broadcast of Opera North conducted by David Lloyd-Jones is in English. On the other hand, the 1962 Oscar Danon and the 1990 Bernard Haitink recordings are Western performances sung in Russian.

== Structure ==
- This is a sortable table. Click on the button next to the criterion you would like to use to sort the information.
- The numbers are given according to the traditional Rimsky-Korsakov-Glazunov edition.
- The dates refer to composition, not orchestration. Where a pair of dates differ, a large gap (more than one year) may indicate an interruption of composition or a revision of the musical number.
- In No.1 (the Prologue), the Eclipse scene (301 bars) was orchestrated by Rimsky-Korsakov and the remainder by Borodin.

No.	Act	Number	Start	End	Composer	Orchestrator
–	–	Overture	1887	1887	Glazunov	Glazunov
1	–	Prologue	1876	1885	Borodin	Borodin*
2a	Act 1, Scene 1	Chorus	1875	1875	Borodin	Rimsky-Korsakov
2b	Act 1, Scene 1	Recitative and Song: Galitsky	1879	1879	Borodin	Borodin
2c	Act 1, Scene 1	Recitative: Galitsky	n.a.	n.a.	Borodin	Rimsky-Korsakov
2d	Act 1, Scene 1	Maiden's Chorus and Scena	n.a.	n.a.	Borodin	Rimsky-Korsakov
2e	Act 1, Scene 1	Scena: Skula, Yeroshka	n.a.	n.a.	Borodin	Rimsky-Korsakov
2f	Act 1, Scene 1	Song in Honor of Prince Galitsky: Skula, Yeroshka	1878	1878	Borodin	Rimsky-Korsakov
2g	Act 1, Scene 1	Chorus	n.a.	n.a.	Borodin	Rimsky-Korsakov
3	Act 1, Scene 2	Arioso: Yaroslavna	1869	1875	Borodin	Rimsky-Korsakov
4	Act 1, Scene 2	Scena: Yaroslavna, Nurse, Chorus	1879	1879	Borodin	Borodin
5	Act 1, Scene 2	Scena: Yaroslavna, Galitsky	1879	1879	Borodin	Rimsky-Korsakov
6	Act 1, Scene 2	Finale: Yaroslavna, Galitsky, Chorus	1879	1880	Borodin	Rimsky-Korsakov
7	Act 2	Chorus of Polovtsian Maidens	n.a.	n.a.	Borodin	Rimsky-Korsakov
8	Act 2	Dance of Polovtsian Maidens	n.a.	n.a.	Borodin	Rimsky-Korsakov
9	Act 2	Cavatina: Konchakovna	1869	1869	Borodin	Borodin
10	Act 2	Scena: Konchakovna, Chorus	1887	1887	Rimsky-Korsakov / Glazunov	Rimsky-Korsakov / Glazunov
11	Act 2	Recitative and Cavatina: Vladimir	1877	1878	Borodin	Borodin
12	Act 2	Duet: Vladimir, Konchakovna	1877	1878	Borodin	Rimsky-Korsakov
13	Act 2	Aria: Igor	1881	1881	Borodin	Rimsky-Korsakov
14	Act 2	Scena: Igor, Ovlur	n.a.	n.a.	Borodin	Rimsky-Korsakov
15	Act 2	Aria: Konchak	1874	1875	Borodin	Borodin
16	Act 2	Recitative: Igor, Konchak	n.a.	n.a.	Borodin	Rimsky-Korsakov
17	Act 2	Polovtsian Dances with Chorus	1869	1875	Borodin	Borodin / Rimsky-Korsakov / Lyadov
18	Act 3	Polovtsian March	1869	1875	Borodin	Borodin / Rimsky-Korsakov
19	Act 3	Song: Konchak	n.a.	n.a.	Glazunov	Glazunov
20	Act 3	Recitative and Scena	n.a.	n.a.	Borodin	Glazunov
22	Act 3	Recitative: Ovlur, Igor	1888	1888	Glazunov	Glazunov
23	Act 3	Trio: Igor, Vladimir, Konchakovna	n.a.	1888	Borodin / Glazunov	Glazunov
24	Act 3	Finale: Konchakovna, Konchak, Chorus	1884	n.a.	Borodin / Glazunov	Glazunov
25	Act 4	Lament: Yaroslavna	1875	1875	Borodin	Borodin
26	Act 4	Peasant's Chorus	1879	1879	Borodin	Borodin
27	Act 4	Recitative and Duet: Yaroslavna, Igor	1876	1876	Borodin	Rimsky-Korsakov
28	Act 4	Gudok-Players' Song, Scena and Chorus	n.a.	n.a.	Borodin	Rimsky-Korsakov
29	Act 4	Finale: Skula, Yeroshka, Chorus	n.a.	n.a.	Borodin	Borodin / Rimsky-Korsakov

== Recordings ==
This is a list of studio recordings. A comprehensive list of all recordings of Prince Igor may be found at operadis-opera-discography.org.uk

Audio

- 1936-38, Lev Steinberg, Aleksander Orlov and Alexander Melik-Pashayev (conductor), Bolshoi Theatre Orchestra and Chorus, Alexander Baturin (Igor), Xenia Derzhinskaya (Yaroslavna), Ivan Kozlovsky (Vladimir), Aleksandr Pirogov (Galitsky), Maxim Mikhailov (Konchak), Elizaveta Antonova (Konchakovna) (abridged over 32 sides)
- 1941, Alexander Melik-Pashayev (conductor), Bolshoi Theatre Orchestra and Chorus, Alexander Baturin (Igor), Sofia Panova (Yaroslavna), Ivan Kozlovsky (Vladimir), Alexander Pirogov (Galitsky), Maxim Mikhailov (Konchak), Nadezhda Obukhova (Konchakovna) - Melodiya
- 1952, Alexander Melik-Pashayev (conductor), Bolshoy Theatre Orchestra and Chorus, Andrey Ivanov (Igor), Yelena Smolenskaya (Yaroslavna), Sergey Lemeshev (Vladimir), Alexander Pirogov (Galitsky), Mark Reyzen (Konchak), Vera Borisenko (Konchakovna) - Melodiya
- 1955, Oskar Danon (conductor), Belgrade National Opera Orchestra and Chorus; Dušan Popović (Igor), Valerija Heybalova (Yaroslavna), Noni Zunec (Vladimir), Žarko Cvejić (Galitsky, Konchak), Melanija Bugarinović (Konchakovna) - Decca / London
- 1966, Jerzy Semkow (conductor), National Opera Theatre of Sofia; Constantin Chekerliiski (Igor), Julia Wiener (Yaroslavna), Todor Todorov (Vladimir), Boris Christoff (Galitsky, Konchak), Reni Penkova (Konchakovna) - EMI /Angel / Pathé
- 1969, Mark Ermler (conductor), Bolshoy Theatre Orchestra and Chorus; Ivan Petrov (Igor), Tatyana Tugarinova (Yaroslavna), Vladimir Atlantov (Vladimir), Artur Eisen (Galitsky), Aleksandr Vedernikov (Konchak), Elena Obraztsova (Konchakovna) - Melodiya
- 1990, Emil Tchakarov (conductor), Sofia Festival Orchestra and National Opera Chorus, Boris Martinovich (Igor), Stefka Evstatieva (Yaroslavna), Kaludi Kaludov (Vladimir), Nicola Ghiuselev (Galitsky), Nicolai Ghiaurov (Konchak), Alexandrina Milcheva-Nonova (Konchakovna) - Sony 44878
- 1993, Valery Gergiev (conductor), Kirov Opera Orchestra and Chorus; Mikhail Kit (Igor), Galina Gorchakova (Yaroslavna), Gegham Grigoryan (Vladimir), Vladimir Ognovienko (Galitsky), Bulat Minjelkiev (Konchak), Olga Borodina (Konchakovna) - Philips 442–537–2.

Video

- 1981 Evgeny Nesterenko (Prince Igor), Elena Kurovskaya (Jaroslavna), Vladimir Sherbakov (Vladimir Igorevich), Alexander Vedernikov (Prince Galitsky), Boris Morozov (Konchak), Tamara Sinyavskaya (Konchakovna), Vladimir Petrov (Ovlur), Valery Yaroslavtsev (Skula), Konstantin Baskov (Yeroshka), Nina Grigorieva (Nurse), Margarita Miglau (Polovtsian Maiden) Orchestra & Chorus of the Bolshoi Theatre, Mark Ermler.
- 1993 Nikolai Putilin, Galina Gorchakova, Evgeny Akimov, Sergey Aleksashkin, Vladimir Vaneev, Olga Borodina, Kirov Opera & Ballet, Valery Gergiev

== Popular culture ==
In the American musical Kismet (1953), most of the score was adapted from works by Borodin. Themes from the Polovtsian Dances from Prince Igor were used extensively and the "Gliding Dance of the Maidens" provided the melody for the popular hit song "Stranger in Paradise".

In The Simpsons episode "Simpson Tide", the Boyars' Chorus (Act 1, Scene 2) plays while tanks emerge from parade floats during a peace parade on Red Square in front of Saint Basil's, soldiers walk out of a building, the Berlin Wall re-erects itself out of the ground, and Lenin rises from his grave, saying "Rrr! Must Crush Capitalism, Rrr!". The "Gliding dance of the Maidens" is also played during the Valentine's Day Itchy and Scratchy cartoon featured in The Simpsons episode "I Love Lisa".

Musical quotations from the Polovtsian Dances can be heard:

- in Warren G's 1997 hit "Prince Igor", and in the track "Echoes" on Pink Floyd's 1971 album, "Meddle"
- Masterplan – Lonely Winds Of War (2010)
- Nabiha - The Enemy (2010)
- Arash feat. Helena – Angels Lullaby (2021)
- Olivia Addams x Dylan Fuentes — Telepathy (2022)
- The Amazing Digital Circus - Episode 7 (2025)

== See also ==
- Cuman people
- Cumania
- Solar eclipses in fiction
