= Alexander Borodin =

Russian Romantic composer, physician, and chemist (1833–1887)

- Александр Бородин
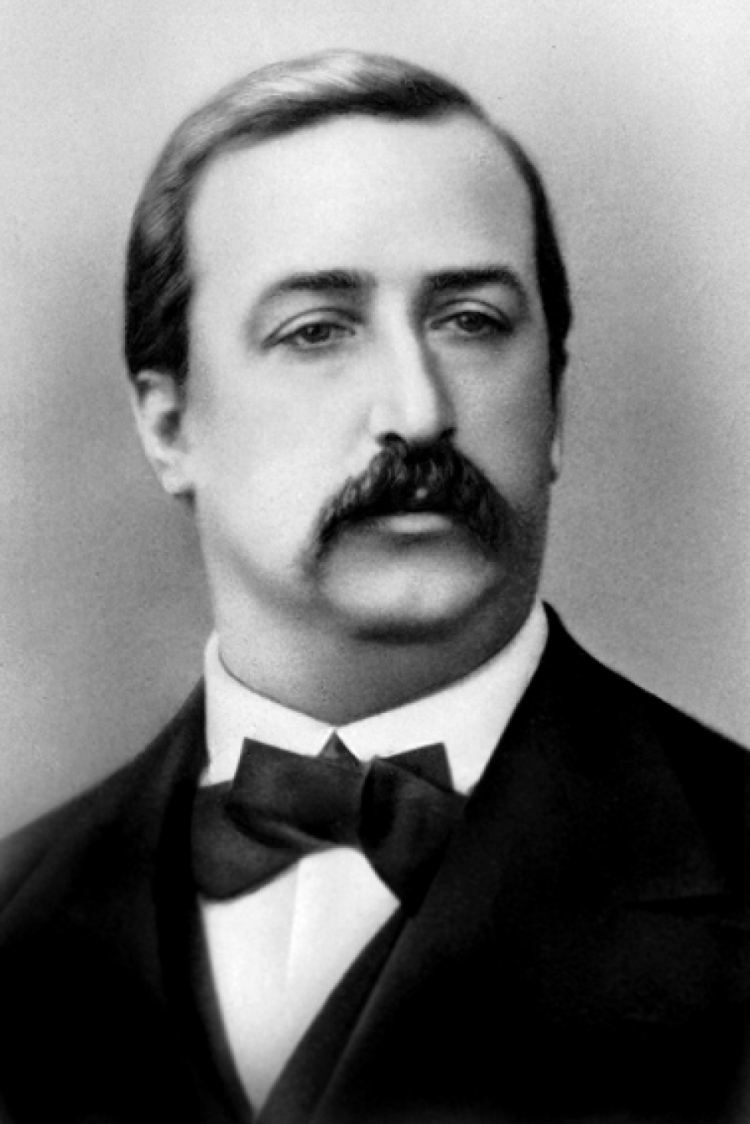
- Born: 12 November 1833; St. Petersburg, Russia
- Died: 27 February 1887 (aged 53); St. Petersburg, Russia
- Burial place: Tikhvin Cemetery, St. Petersburg
- Works: List of compositions
- Scientific career
- Fields: Chemistry
- Workplaces: Heidelberg University; Imperial Medical and Surgical Academy

Alexander Porfiryevich Borodin (Note: Russian: Александр Порфирьевич Бородин, romanized: Aleksandr Porfiryevich Borodin The BGN/PCGN transliteration of Russian is used for his name here. ALA-LC system: Aleksandr Porfirʹevich Borodin, ISO 9 system: Aleksandr Porfirʹevič Borodin. pronounced [ɐlʲɪkˈsandr pɐrˈfʲi ʲjɪvʲɪtɕ bərɐˈdʲin]; Latin: Alexander Porphirii filius Borodin) (12 November 1833 – 27 February 1887) (Note: Old Style dates 31 October 1833 – 15 February 1887.) was a Russian Romantic composer and chemist of Georgian–Russian parentage. He was one of the prominent 19th-century composers known as "The Five", a group dedicated to producing a "uniquely Russian" kind of classical music. Borodin is known best for his symphonies, his two string quartets, the symphonic poem In the Steppes of Central Asia and his opera Prince Igor.

A doctor and chemist by profession and training, Borodin made important early contributions to organic chemistry. Although he is presently known better as a composer, he regarded medicine and science as his primary occupations, only practising music and composition in his spare time or when he was ill. As a chemist, Borodin is known best for his work concerning organic synthesis, including being among the first chemists to demonstrate nucleophilic substitution, as well as being the co-discoverer of the aldol reaction. Borodin was a promoter of education in Russia and founded the School of Medicine for Women in Saint Petersburg, where he taught until 1885.

In the 1880s pressures of work and ill health left him little time for composition. He died suddenly in 1887 while at a ball.

== Early life ==
=== Family ===
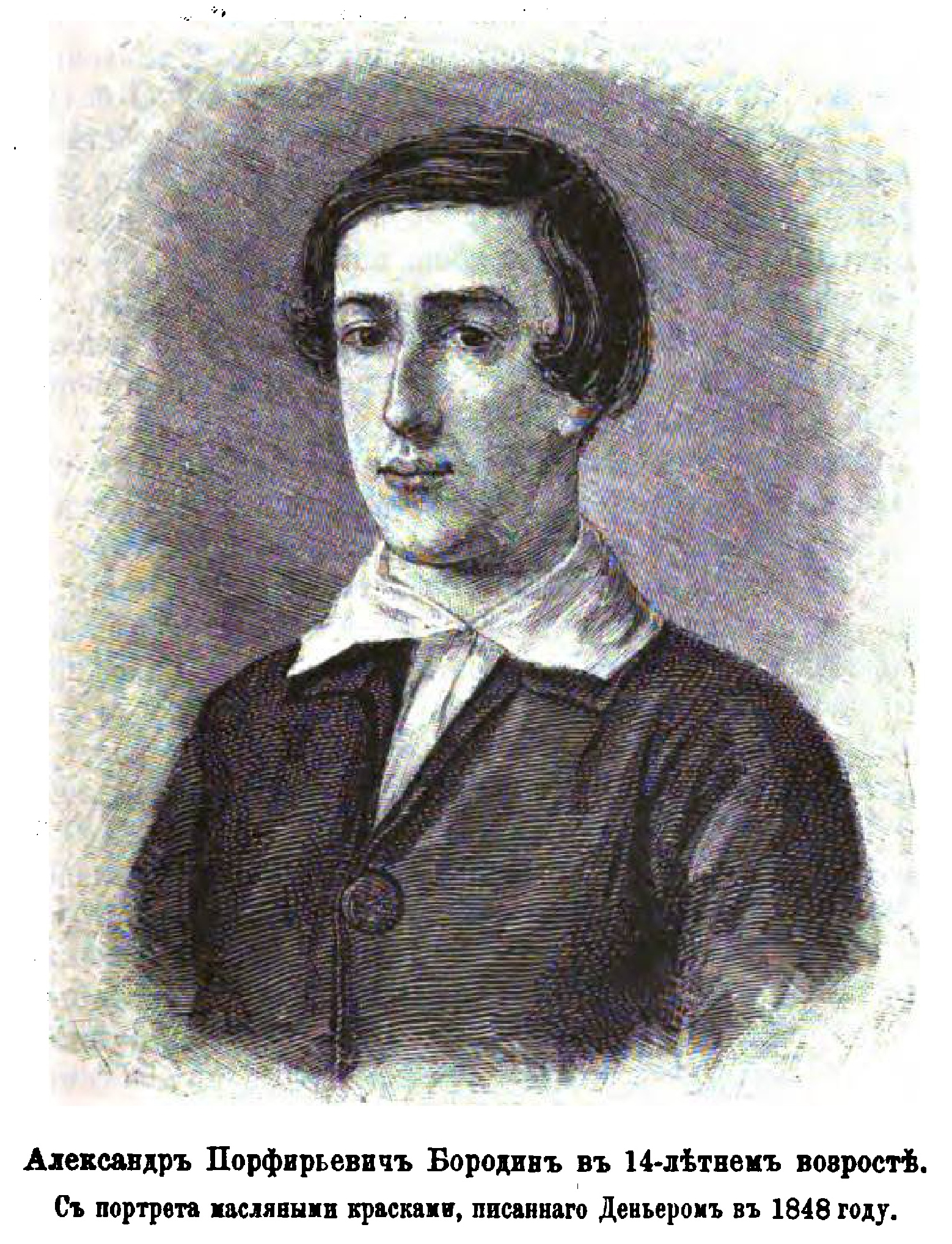
Borodin at the age of 14

Borodin was born in Saint Petersburg as an illegitimate son of a 62-year-old Georgian nobleman, Luka Stepanovich Gedevanishvili, and a 25-year-old Russian woman, Evdokia Konstantinovna Antonova. Due to the circumstances of Alexander's birth, the nobleman had him registered as the son of one of his Russian serfs, Porfiry Borodin, hence the composer's Russian last name. As a result of this registration, both Alexander and his nominal Russian father Porfiry were officially serfs of Alexander's biological father Luka. The Georgian father emancipated Alexander from serfdom when he was 7 years old and provided housing and money for him and his mother. Despite this, Alexander was never publicly recognized by his mother, who was referred to by young Borodin as his "aunt".

Despite his status as a commoner, Borodin was well provided for by his Georgian father and grew up in a large four-storey house, which was gifted to Alexander and his "aunt" by the nobleman. Although his registration prevented enrollment in a proper gymnasium, Borodin received good education in all of the subjects through private tutors at home. During 1850 he enrolled in the Medical–Surgical Academy in Saint Petersburg, which was later the workplace of Ivan Pavlov, and pursued a career in chemistry. On graduation he spent a year as surgeon in a military hospital, followed by three years of advanced scientific study in western Europe.

During 1862, Borodin returned to Saint Petersburg to begin a professorship of chemistry at the Imperial Medical-Surgical Academy and spent the remainder of his scientific career in research, lecturing and overseeing the education of others. Eventually, he established medical courses for women in 1872.

He began taking lessons in composition from Mily Balakirev during 1862. Music remained a secondary vocation for Borodin besides his main career as a chemist and physician.

== Career ==
=== Career as a chemist ===
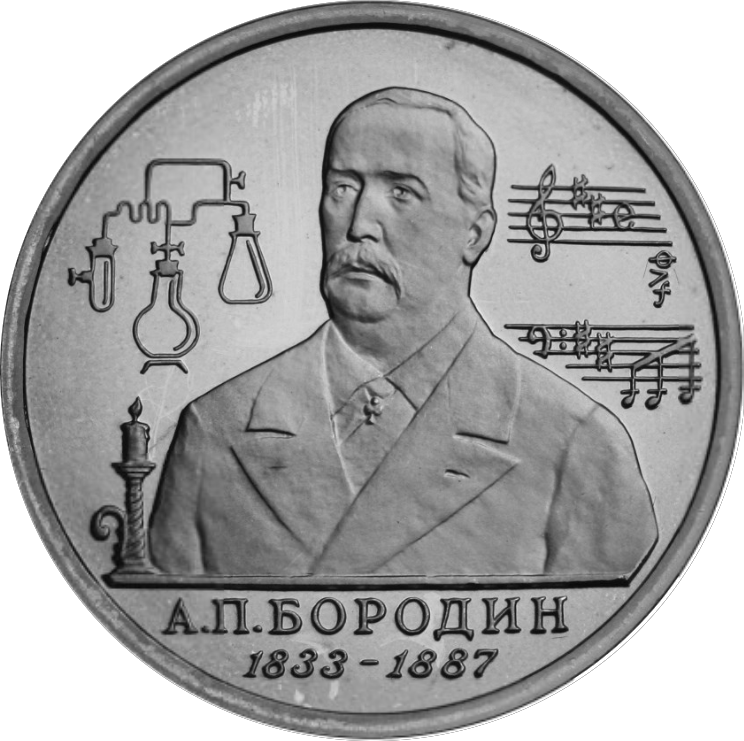
1993 Russian 1 ruble coin commemorating the 160th anniversary of Borodin's birth

In his profession Borodin gained great respect, being particularly noted for his work on aldehydes. Between 1859 and 1862 Borodin had a postdoctoral position at Heidelberg University. He worked in the laboratory of Emil Erlenmeyer working on benzene derivatives. He also spent time in Pisa, working on halocarbons. One experiment published during 1862 described the first nucleophilic displacement of chlorine by fluorine in benzoyl chloride. The radical halodecarboxylation of aliphatic carboxylic acids was first demonstrated by Borodin during 1861 by his synthesis of methyl bromide from silver acetate. It was Heinz Hunsdiecker and his wife Cläre, however, who developed Borodin's work into a general method, for which they were granted a US patent during 1939, and which they published in the journal Chemische Berichte during 1942. The method is generally known as either the Hunsdiecker reaction or the Hunsdiecker–Borodin reaction.

During 1862, Borodin returned to the Medical–Surgical Academy (now known as the S. M. Kirov Military Medical Academy), and accepted a professorship of chemistry. He worked on self-condensation of small aldehydes in a process now known as the aldol reaction, the discovery of which is jointly credited to Borodin and Charles Adolphe Wurtz. Borodin investigated the condensation of valerian aldehyde and oenanth aldehyde, which was reported by von Richter during 1869. During 1873, he described his work to the Russian Chemical Society and noted similarities with compounds recently reported by Wurtz.

He published his last full article during 1875 on reactions of amides and his last publication concerned a method for the identification of urea in animal urine.

His successor as chemistry professor of the Medical-Surgical academy was his son-in-law and fellow chemist, Aleksandr Dianin.

=== Musical avocation ===
==== Opera and orchestral works ====
In the Steppes of Central Asia

Aria of Galitsky from the 1890 opera Prince Igor
Recorded during a live performance in 1970; performed by Georgi Petrov (bass-baritone)

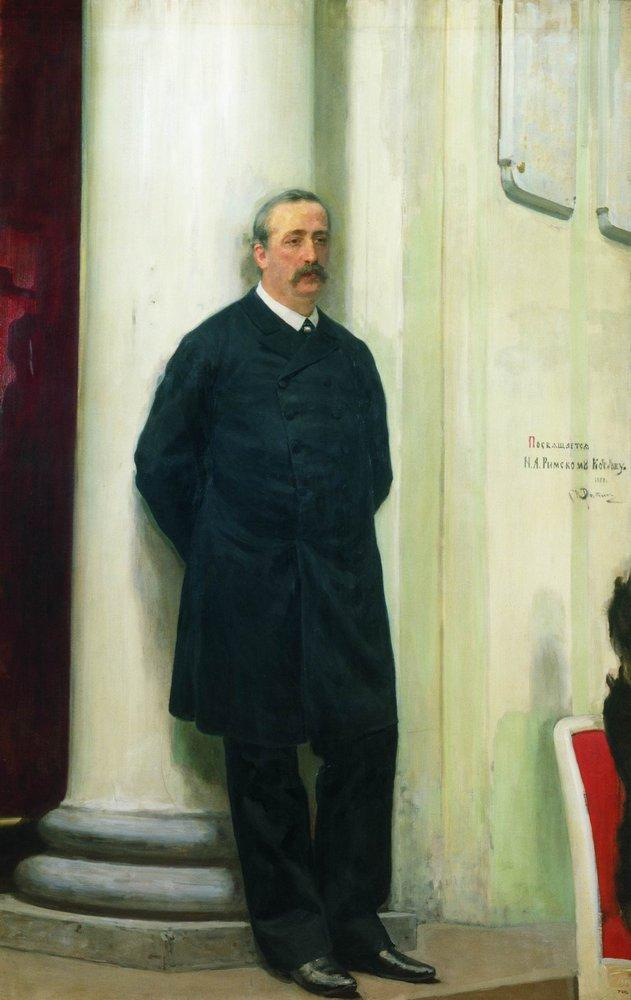
Portrait of Borodin by Ilya Repin, 1888

Borodin met Mily Balakirev during 1862. While under Balakirev's tutelage in composition he began his Symphony No. 1 in E-flat major; it was first performed during 1869, with Balakirev conducting. During that same year Borodin started on his Symphony No. 2 in B minor, which was not particularly successful at its premiere during 1877 under Eduard Nápravník, but with some minor re-orchestration received a successful performance during 1879 by the Free Music School under Nikolai Rimsky-Korsakov's direction. During 1880 he composed the popular symphonic poem In the Steppes of Central Asia. Two years later he began composing a third symphony, but left it unfinished at his death; two movements of it were later completed and orchestrated by Alexander Glazunov.

During 1868, Borodin became distracted from initial work on the second symphony by preoccupation with the opera Prince Igor, which is considered by some to be his most significant work and one of the most important historical Russian operas. It contains the Polovtsian Dances, often performed as a stand-alone concert work forming what is probably Borodin's best-known composition. Borodin left the opera (and a few other works) incomplete at his death.

Prince Igor was completed posthumously by Rimsky-Korsakov and Alexander Glazunov. It is set in the 12th century, when the Russians, commanded by Prince Igor of Seversk, determined to conquer the barbarous Polovtsians by travelling eastward across the Steppes. The Polovtsians were apparently a nomadic tribe originally of Turkic origin who habitually attacked southern Russia. A full solar eclipse early during the first act foreshadows an ominous outcome to the invasion. Prince Igor's troops are defeated. The story tells of the capture of Prince Igor, and his son, Vladimir, of Russia by Polovtsian chief Khan Konchak, who entertains his prisoners lavishly and orders his slaves to perform the famous 'Polovtsian Dances', which provide a thrilling climax to the second act. The second half of the opera finds Prince Igor returning to his homeland, but rather than finding himself in disgrace, he is welcomed home by the townspeople and by his wife, Yaroslavna. Although for a while rarely performed in its entirety outside of Russia, this opera has received two notable new productions recently, one at the Bolshoi State Opera and Ballet Company in Russia during 2013, and one at the Metropolitan Opera Company of New York City during 2014.

==== Chamber music ====
No other member of the Balakirev circle identified himself so much with absolute music as did Borodin in his two string quartets, in addition to his many earlier chamber compositions. As a cellist, he was an enthusiastic chamber music player, an interest that increased during his chemical studies in Heidelberg between 1859 and 1861. This early period yielded, among other chamber works, a string sextet and a piano quintet. Borodin based the thematic structure and instrumental texture of his pieces on those of Felix Mendelssohn.

During 1875 Borodin started his First String Quartet, much to the displeasure of Mussorgsky and Vladimir Stasov; the other members of The Five were known to be hostile to chamber music. The First Quartet demonstrates mastery of the string quartet form. Borodin's Second Quartet, written in 1881, displays strong lyricism, as in the third movement's popular "Nocturne." While the First Quartet is richer in changes of mood, the Second Quartet has a more uniform atmosphere and expression.

== Personal life and death ==
He married Ekaterina Protopopova, a pianist, during 1863, with whom he adopted several daughters. Music remained a secondary vocation for Borodin besides his main career as a chemist and physician. He suffered poor health, having overcome cholera and several minor heart attacks. He died suddenly during a ball and was interred in the Tikhvin Cemetery at the Alexander Nevsky Monastery in Saint Petersburg.

== Musical legacy ==
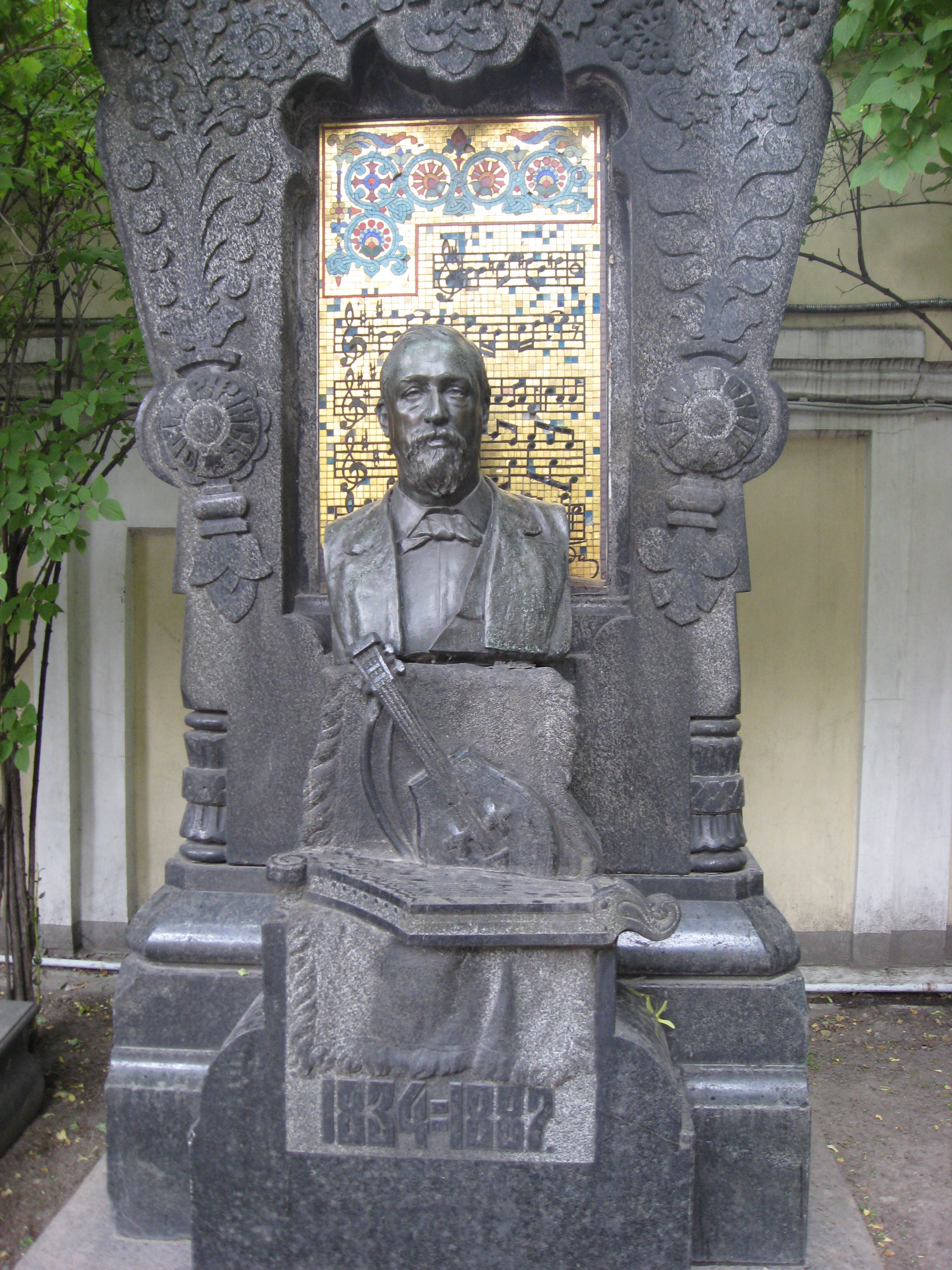
Tomb of Borodin in Tikhvin Cemetery. The musical notation in the background shows themes from Symphony No. 2, the "Gliding Dance of the Maidens" from Polovtsian Dances; "Song of the Dark Forest"; and the "Scherzo" theme from Symphony No. 3.

Borodin's fame outside the Russian Empire was made possible during his lifetime by Franz Liszt, who arranged a performance of the Symphony No. 1 in Germany during 1880, and by the Comtesse de Mercy-Argenteau in Belgium and France. His music is noted for its strong lyricism and rich harmonies. Along with some influences from Western composers, as a member of The Five, his music is also characteristic of the Russian style. His passionate music and unusual harmonies proved to have a lasting influence on the younger French composers Debussy and Ravel (in homage, the latter composed during 1913 a piano piece entitled "À la manière de Borodine").

The evocative characteristics of Borodin's music—specifically In the Steppes of Central Asia, his Symphony No. 2, Prince Igor – made possible the adaptation of his compositions in the 1953 musical Kismet, by Robert Wright and George Forrest, notably in the songs "Stranger in Paradise", "And This Is My Beloved" and "Baubles, Bangles, & Beads". In 1954, Borodin was posthumously awarded a Tony Award for this show.

== Legacy ==
- The Borodin Quartet was named in his honour.
- The chemist Alexander Shulgin uses the name "Alexander Borodin" as a fictional persona in the books PiHKAL and TiHKAL.
- In his book Burning in Water, Drowning in Flame (1974) Charles Bukowski wrote a poem about the composer entitled "The Life of Borodin".
- The asteroid previously known by its provisional designation 1990 ES3 was assigned the permanent name (6780) Borodin, in honor of Alexander Borodin. (6780) Borodin is a main-belt asteroid with an estimated diameter of 4 km and an orbital period of 3.37 years.
- The score of the 1953 musical Kismet and the subsequent film version was based extensively on compositions by Borodin, such as the second string quartet, second symphony and piano works.
- On 12 November 2018, Google recognized him with a doodle.
