= Kiss Them for Me =

Kiss Them for Me may refer to:

- Kiss Them for Me (play), a 1945 Broadway play by Luther Davis
- Kiss Them for Me (film), a 1957 adaptation of the play starring Cary Grant and Jayne Mansfield
- "Kiss Them for Me" (song), a 1991 song by Siouxsie & the Banshees
