= Timbuktu! =

1978 musical

- Original Broadway Playbill
- Music: George Forrest; Robert Wright
- Lyrics: George Forrest; Robert Wright
- Book: Luther Davis
- Basis: The musical Kismet
- Productions: 1978 Broadway

Timbuktu! is a musical, with lyrics by George Forrest and Robert Wright, set to music by Borodin, Forrest and Wright. The book is by Luther Davis. It is a resetting of Forrest and Wright's musical Kismet (which also had a book co-written by Davis), and the majority of the play's songs are reused from Kismet. The musical is set in 1361 in Timbuktu, in the Empire of Mali, West Africa.

For the 1978 Tony Awards, the play was considered a revival rather than a new work, and was nominated for a Tony in the Best Revival category.

== Production history ==
The musical premiered on Broadway at the Mark Hellinger Theatre on March 1, 1978, and closed on September 10, 1978, after 221 performances and 22 previews.

The original production starred Eartha Kitt as Shaleem-La-Lume, William Marshall as Hadji, Gilbert Price as the Mansa of Mali, Melba Moore as Marsinah, and George Bell as the Wazir. Ira Hawkins replaced Marshall prior to the Broadway opening. It was directed, choreographed and costume designed by Geoffrey Holder, with sets designed by Tony Straiges. Alan Eichler was associate producer. Gerald Bordman noted that the sets and costumes had "a Ziegfeldian opulence." The score was largely that of Kismet, though several songs were dropped and three new songs based on African folk music were added to provide "some tonal verisimiltude."

Following its Broadway run, it toured for more than a year with Kitt continuing in her starring role as Shaleem-La-Lume, Gregg Baker as Hadji, Bruce Hubbard as the Mansa and Vanessa Shaw as Marsinah.

== Original cast and characters ==
Character	Broadway (1978)	First National Tour (1978)
Sahleem-La-Lume	Eartha Kitt	Eartha Kitt
Marsinah	Melba Moore	Vanessa Shaw
The Mansa of Mali	Gilbert Price	Bruce Hubbard
Hadji	Ira Hawkins	Gregg Baker
Munshi	Miguel Godreau	Homer Bryant
The Wazir	George Bell	George Bell
Chief Policeman	Bruce Hubbard	Ronald A. Richardson
Najua	Eleanor McCoy	Dyane Harvey
M'Ballah of the River	Daniel Barton	Daniel Barton
Zubbediya	Vanessa Shaw	Priscilla Baskerville
The Orange Merchant	Obba Babatundé	Luther Fontaine

== Songs ==
Act I

- † "Rhymes Have I" - Hadji, Marsinah and Beggars
- † "Fate" - Hadji
- "In the Beginning, Woman" - Shaleem-La-Lume
- † "Baubles, Bangles and Beads" - Marsinah and Merchants
- † "Stranger in Paradise" - The Mansa of Mali and Marsinah
- † "Gesticulate" - Hadji and Council
- † "Night of My Nights" - The Mansa of Mali and Courtiers

Act II

- † "My Magic Lamp" - Marsinah
- † "Stranger in Paradise (Reprise)" - Marsinah
- † "Rahadlakum" - Shaleem-La-Lume and Ladies of the Harem
- † "And This Is My Beloved" - Hadji, Marsinah, The Mansa of Mali and The Wazir
- "Golden Land, Golden Life" - Chief Policeman and Nobles of the Court
- "Zubbediya" - Zubbediya, Princess, Marriage Candidates and Acrobat
- † "Night of My Nights (Reprise)" - The Mansa of Mali, Marsinah, Hadji and Nobles of the Court
- † "Sands of Time" - Hadji and Shaleem-La-Lume

Songs labelled '†' are from Kismet.

== Awards and nominations ==
1978 Tony Award nominations

- Tony Award for Best Actor in a Musical - Gilbert Price
- Tony Award for Best Actress in a Musical - Eartha Kitt
- Tony Award for Best Costume Design - Geoffrey Holder
- Tony Award for Most Innovative Production of a Revival - Luther Davis

1978 Drama Desk Award nominations

- Drama Desk Award for Outstanding Choreography - Geoffrey Holder
- Drama Desk Award Outstanding Costume Design - Geoffrey Holder
