= Scranton, Kansas =

City in Osage County, Kansas

- City
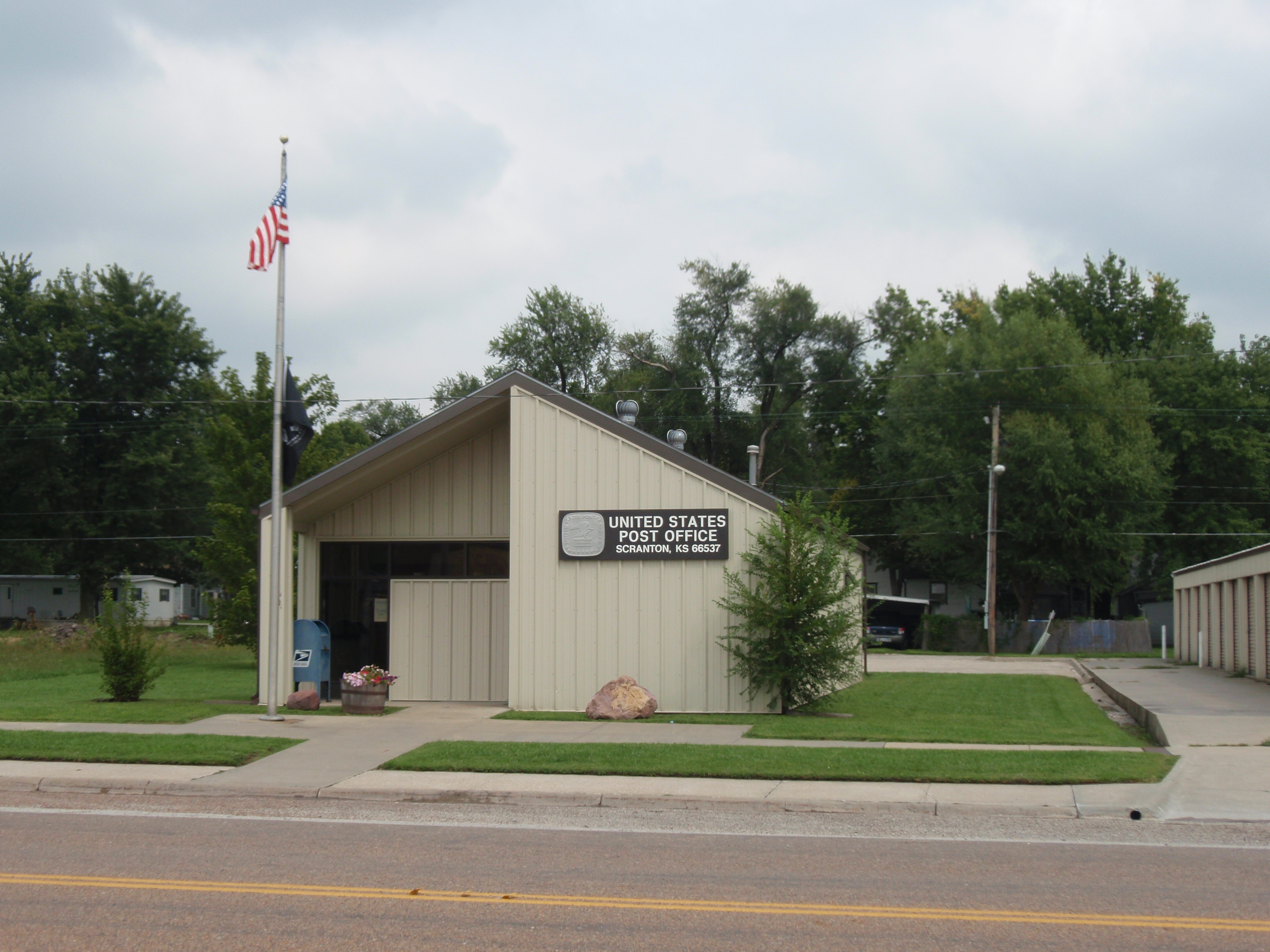
- U.S Post Office in Scranton (2009)

- Location within Osage County and Kansas

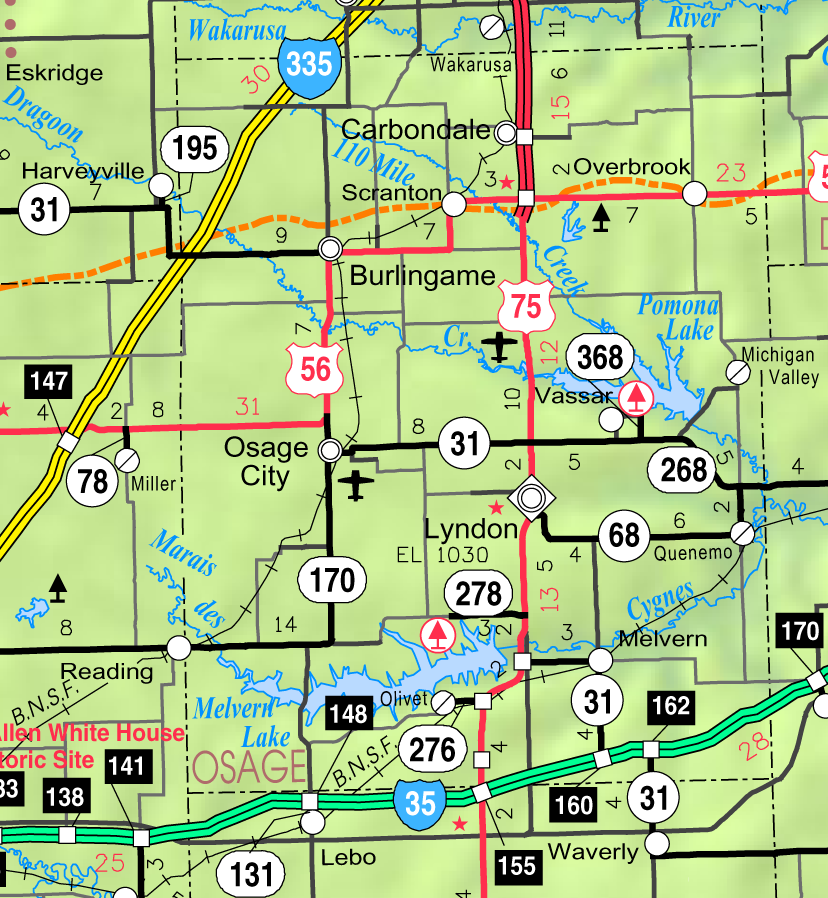
- KDOT map of Osage County (legend)
- Coordinates: 38°46′46″N 95°44′17″W
- Country: United States
- State: Kansas
- County: Osage
- Founded: 1871
- Incorporated: 1872
- Named for: Scranton, Pennsylvania

Area
  - Total: 1.08 sq mi (2.80 km^{2})
  - Land: 1.08 sq mi (2.79 km^{2})
  - Water: 0.0039 sq mi (0.01 km^{2})
- Elevation: 1,122 ft (342 m)

Population (2020)
  - Total: 653
  - Density: 606/sq mi (234/km^{2})
- Time zone: UTC-6 (CST)
  - Summer (DST): UTC-5 (CDT)
- ZIP Code: 66537
- Area code: 785
- FIPS code: 20-63675
- GNIS ID: 479457
- Website: scrantonks.com

Scranton is a city in Osage County, Kansas, United States. As of the 2020 census, the population of the city was 653. It was named after the city of Scranton, Pennsylvania due to its coal mining in the 19th century.

== History ==
Scranton was founded in 1871 as a coal town. It was named after Scranton, Pennsylvania.

The first post office in Scranton was established in September 1872.

As of 1890, Scranton was reported to be one of many Kansas coal mining towns that were sundown towns, meaning that African Americans were not allowed to live there.

== Geography ==
Scranton is located at 38°46′46″N 95°44′17″W (38.779307, -95.737918). According to the United States Census Bureau, the city has a total area of 1.07 square miles (2.77 km^{2}), all land.

=== Climate ===
The climate in this area is characterized by hot, humid summers and generally mild to cool winters. According to the Köppen Climate Classification system, Scranton has a humid subtropical climate, abbreviated "Cfa" on climate maps.

== Demographics ==
Historical population
Census	Pop.	Note	%±
1880	835		—
1890	1,572		88.3%
1900	1,099		−30.1%
1910	770		−29.9%
1920	622		−19.2%
1930	538		−13.5%
1940	500		−7.1%
1950	487		−2.6%
1960	576		18.3%
1970	575		−0.2%
1980	664		15.5%
1990	674		1.5%
2000	724		7.4%
2010	710		−1.9%
2020	653		−8.0%
U.S. Decennial Census

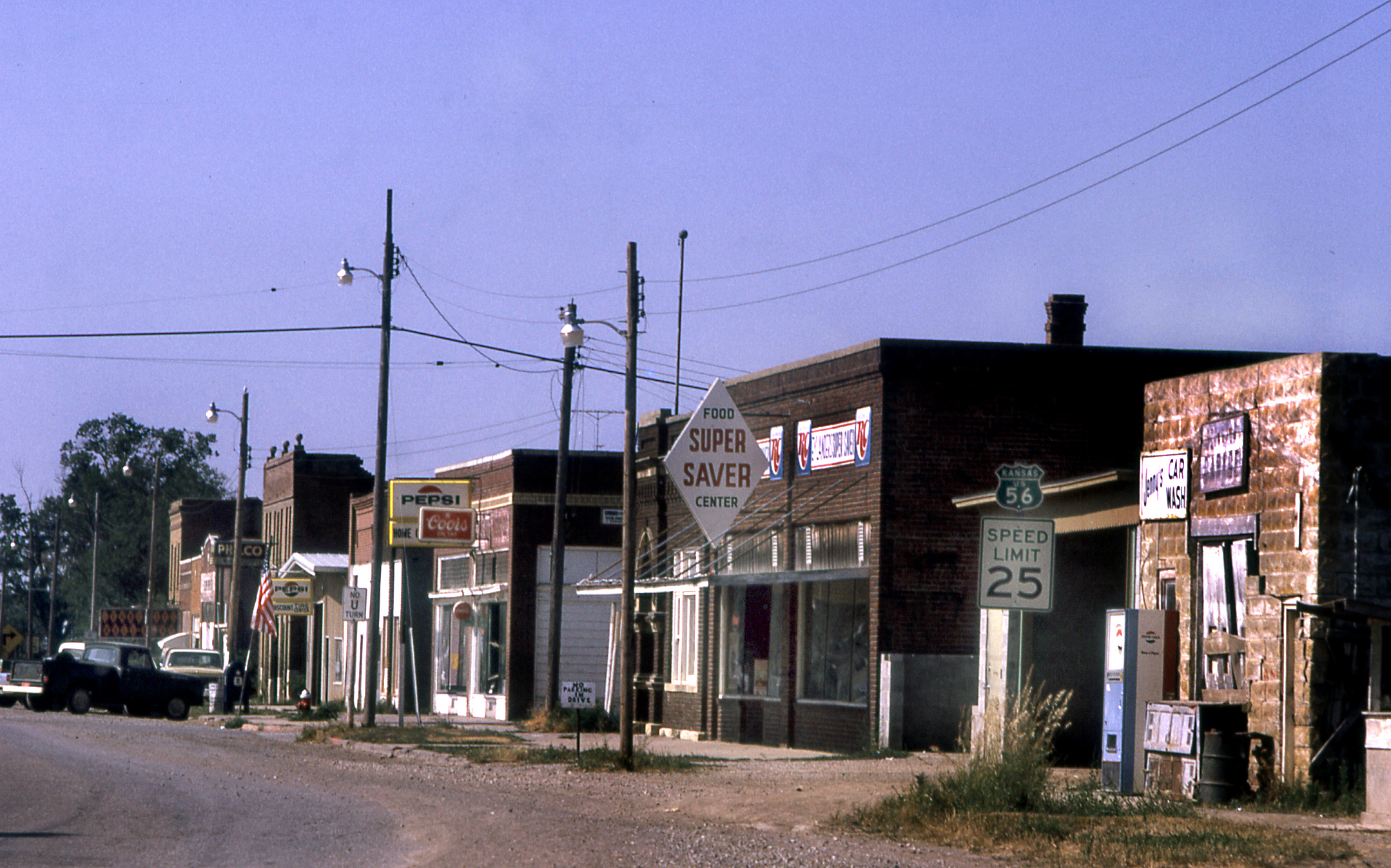
Scranton (1974)

Scranton is part of the Topeka, Kansas Metropolitan Statistical Area.

=== 2010 census ===
As of the census of 2010, there were 710 people, 265 households, and 189 families residing in the city. The population density was 663.6 inhabitants per square mile (256.2/km^{2}). There were 297 housing units at an average density of 277.6 per square mile (107.2/km^{2}). The racial makeup of the city was 97.6% White, 0.4% Native American, 0.6% Asian, 0.8% from other races, and 0.6% from two or more races. Hispanic or Latino of any race were 2.4% of the population.

There were 265 households, of which 37.0% had children under the age of 18 living with them, 54.7% were married couples living together, 10.6% had a female householder with no husband present, 6.0% had a male householder with no wife present, and 28.7% were non-families. 24.2% of all households were made up of individuals, and 11.3% had someone living alone who was 65 years of age or older. The average household size was 2.68 and the average family size was 3.19.

The median age in the city was 36.8 years. 30.3% of residents were under the age of 18; 7.7% were between the ages of 18 and 24; 23.2% were from 25 to 44; 24.2% were from 45 to 64; and 14.5% were 65 years of age or older. The gender makeup of the city was 48.7% male and 51.3% female.

=== 2000 census ===
As of the census of 2000, there were 724 people, 263 households, and 181 families residing in the city. The population density was 675.3 inhabitants per square mile (260.7/km^{2}). There were 289 housing units at an average density of 269.6 per square mile (104.1/km^{2}). The racial makeup of the city was 95.44% White, 0.83% African American, 0.69% Native American, 0.14% Asian, and 2.90% from two or more races. Hispanic or Latino of any race were 1.52% of the population.

There were 263 households, out of which 35.7% had children under the age of 18 living with them, 53.2% were married couples living together, 10.3% had a female householder with no husband present, and 30.8% were non-families. 25.1% of all households were made up of individuals, and 12.9% had someone living alone who was 65 years of age or older. The average household size was 2.75 and the average family size was 3.34.

In the city, the population was spread out, with 31.9% under the age of 18, 7.3% from 18 to 24, 29.7% from 25 to 44, 19.5% from 45 to 64, and 11.6% who were 65 years of age or older. The median age was 33 years. For every 100 females, there were 90.0 males. For every 100 females age 18 and over, there were 94.1 males.

The median income for a household in the city was $37,794, and the median income for a family was $40,521. Males had a median income of $31,364 versus $22,083 for females. The per capita income for the city was $15,210. About 8.3% of families and 11.9% of the population were below the poverty line, including 18.6% of those under age 18 and 6.8% of those age 65 or over.

== Education ==
The community is served by Santa Fe Trail USD 434 public school district, which includes Carbondale, Overbrook and Scranton. The district high school is Santa Fe Trail High School.

The Santa Fe Trail Chargers won the Kansas State High School boys class 4A basketball championship in 1997 and the girls class 4A basketball championship in 1998.

== Notable people ==
Novelist Frederic Wakeman, best known for his best-selling 1946 novel The Hucksters, which was also adapted to film, was born in Scranton.

== See also ==
- List of sundown towns in the United States
- Santa Fe Trail
