= The Unsinkable Molly Brown (film) =

1964 film directed by Charles Walters

- Theatrical release poster
- Directed by: Charles Walters
- Screenplay by: Helen Deutsch
- Based on: The Unsinkable Molly Brown by Meredith Willson; Richard Morris
- Produced by: Lawrence Weingarten; Sam Yohe
- Starring: Debbie Reynolds; Harve Presnell; Ed Begley
- Cinematography: Daniel L. Fapp
- Edited by: Frederic Steinkamp
- Music by: Meredith Willson
- Production company: Metro-Goldwyn-Mayer
- Distributed by: Metro-Goldwyn-Mayer
- Release date: June 11, 1964
- Running time: 135 minutes
- Country: United States
- Language: English
- Box office: $11 million

The Unsinkable Molly Brown is a 1964 American Western musical comedy film directed by Charles Walters and starring Debbie Reynolds, filmed in Panavision. The screenplay by Helen Deutsch is based on the book of the 1960 musical of the same name by Richard Morris. The song score was composed by Meredith Willson. The plot is a fictionalized account of the life of Margaret Brown, who survived the 1912 sinking of the RMS Titanic. Reynolds was nominated for the Academy Award for Best Actress for her portrayal of Brown.

== Plot ==
Rescued from the Colorado River as an infant and raised by Seamus Tobin, tomboy Molly Tobin is determined to find a wealthy man to marry. She journeys to Leadville, Colorado, and is hired as a saloon singer by Christmas Morgan. After miner Johnny Brown renovates his cabin, the two wed, and he sells his claim in a silver mine for $300,000.

The Browns and Seamus move into a Denver mansion, and Molly sets out to improve her social status by trying to ingratiate herself with the city's elite, all of whom snub her and her nouveau riche ways. She and Johnny go to Europe, where they are embraced by royalty, and the couple return to Denver with their new friends. Molly's plan to introduce them to the people who formerly rejected her is derailed by Johnny's rough-and-tumble friends, whose unexpected and boisterous arrival ruins the gala party Molly is hosting.

Molly decides to return to Europe, leaving Johnny behind. She falls for the charms of Prince Louis de Lanière, but eventually decides she prefers to live with Johnny in Leadville. For the first time in her life, she realizes that someone else's feelings and priorities need to be considered. Setting sail for home aboard the RMS Titanic, she becomes a heroine when the ship sinks and she helps rescue many of her fellow passengers. When her deed makes international headlines, Molly is welcomed home by Johnny and the people of Denver.

== Cast ==
- Debbie Reynolds as Molly Brown
- Harve Presnell as 'Leadville' Johnny Brown
- Ed Begley as Seamus Tobin
- Jack Kruschen as Christmas Morgan
- Hermione Baddeley as Buttercup Grogan
- Vassili Lambrinos as Prince Louis de Laniere
- Fred Essler as Baron Karl Ludwig von Ettenburg
- Harvey Lembeck as Polak
- Lauren Gilbert as Mr. Fitzgerald
- Kathryn Card as Mrs. Wadlington
- Hayden Rorke as Malcolm Broderick
- Harry Holcombe as Mr. Wadlington
- Amy Douglass as Mrs. Fitzgerald
- George Mitchell as Monsignor Ryan
- Martita Hunt as Grand Duchess Elise Lupavinova
- Vaughn Taylor as Mr. Cartwright
- Anthony Eustrel as Roberts
- Audrey Christie as Gladys McGraw
- Grover Dale as Jam
- Brendan Dillon as Murphy
- Maria Karnilova as Daphne
- Gus Trikonis as Joe
- Ramsay Hill as Lord Simon Pimdale (uncredited)

== Production ==
Harve Presnell was the sole member of the original Broadway cast who was invited to reprise his stage role in the film. Although Tammy Grimes had originated the title role and had won the Tony Award for her performance, MGM executives wanted Shirley MacLaine for the film. After she signed, producer Hal Wallis claimed she was under contract to him, and MacLaine was forced to withdraw from the project. After this, many people wanted Judy Garland. Garland was reported to be the star of the film in 1961. When Debbie Reynolds was cast instead, MacLaine publicly accused her of agreeing to accept a lower salary in order to land the role, and director Charles Walters, who preferred MacLaine, tried to persuade Reynolds to turn down the part.

Exteriors were filmed in the Black Canyon of the Gunnison National Park in western Colorado. Some brief black-and-white footage from the 1953 movie Titanic and 1958 movie A Night to Remember, portraying the ill-fated ocean liner's collision with an iceberg and sinking, was interspersed with scenes of Molly Brown aboard the ship and later in a lifeboat.

Only five of the 17 musical numbers from the stage musical were used in the film, and Meredith Willson wrote "He's My Friend" to extend the song score. Peter Gennaro, who had choreographed the original Broadway production, staged the musical sequences.

During production, MGM was putting all its resources into its forthcoming Doctor Zhivago (1965), and at least $1 million was cut from the budget of Molly Brown. Running out of money to complete the film, director Charles Walters proposed cutting the rousing dance number "He's My Friend". To save the number, cast and crew ultimately decided to film it in one rigorous day using multiple cameras to reduce shooting time.

The film grossed $11,070,559 at the domestic box office. It earned $7.5 million in U.S. theatrical rentals.

== Musical numbers ==
- "Belly Up to the Bar, Boys" ... Shamus Tobin, Christmas Morgan, Molly Brown, and Ensemble
- "I Ain't Down Yet" ... Molly Brown
- "Colorado, My Home" ... Johnny Brown
- "I'll Never Say No" ... Johnny Brown and Molly Brown
- "He's My Friend" ... Molly Brown, Johnny Brown, Mrs. Grogan, Grand Duchess Elise Lupovinova, Shamus Tobin, Christmas Morgan, and Ensemble
- "Johnny's Soliloquy" ... Johnny Brown

== Reception ==
=== Critical reception ===
A.H. Weiler of The New York Times called the film "big, brassy, bold and freewheeling" but added, "The tones are ringing, but often hollow. Molly is a colorful character all right, and the screen, which is as wide as can be, is filled with vivid colors that help project the fact that this is merely a satisfying musical comedy and not an inspired subject." He continued, "This is not to say that Meredith Willson's score is not tuneful and lilting but to this listener it is good, sweet corn that is more palatable than memorable. Mr. Gennaro, on the other hand, has devised dances that more than complement Mr. Willson's music. They may seem to be improvised but they have the true marks of professionalism in their carefully plotted verve, bounce and exuberance." He concluded, "The Unsinkable Molly Brown, in the person of Miss Reynolds, and the other principals, often mistakes vigor for art. But Metro's lavish and attractive production numbers make up for this basic superficiality. For all of its shallowness, Molly is a cheerful and entertaining addition to the local screen scene."

Variety observed, "In essence, it's a pretty shallow story since the title character, when you get right down to it, is obsessed with a very superficial, egotistical problem beneath her generous, razzmatazz facade. On top of that, Willson's score is rather undistinguished. Debbie Reynolds thrusts herself into the role with an enormous amount of verve and vigor. At times her approach to the character seems more athletic than artful. Harve Presnell ... makes a generally auspicious screen debut as the patient Johnny. His fine, booming voice and physical stature make him a valuable commodity for Hollywood."

Channel 4 called it an "amiable comedy with a handful of good tunes" that "lacks the satirical bite which its story may suggest. Sometimes the director seems to feel more at ease with the melodramatic moments than the comedy ones."

Time Out London noted, "As ebulliently energetic as ever, Reynolds makes the brash social climbing both funny and touching, but the film itself gets trapped in two minds between satire and sentimentality. The score ... though pleasant, is rather thinly spread; but the sets are a delight in the best traditions of the MGM musical, and Walters does a wonderfully graceful job of direction".

TV Guide rated the film three out of four stars and commented, "A rambunctious and spirited effort from Reynolds ... saves this otherwise weakly scripted, familiar musical from the long list of forgotten pictures."

=== Box office ===
The film set an opening week record at Radio City Music Hall in New York City, grossing $222,000 and became the number one film in the US that week. It went on to be the highest-grossing film at the theater, with a 10-week gross of $2 million.

=== Awards and nominations ===
Award	Category	Nominee(s)	Result	Ref.
Academy Awards	Best Actress	Debbie Reynolds	Nominated	
Academy Awards	Best Art Direction – Color	Art Direction: George Davis and E. Preston Ames; Set Decoration: Henry Grace and Hugh Hunt	Nominated	
Academy Awards	Best Cinematography – Color	Daniel L. Fapp	Nominated	
Academy Awards	Best Costume Design – Color	Morton Haack	Nominated	
Academy Awards	Best Scoring of Music – Adaptation or Treatment	Robert Armbruster, Leo Arnaud, Jack Elliott, Jack Hayes, Calvin Jackson, and Leo Shuken	Nominated	
Academy Awards	Best Sound	Franklin Milton	Nominated	
American Cinema Editors Awards	Best Edited Feature Film	Fredric Steinkamp	Nominated	
American Film Institute	AFI's Greatest Movie Musicals		Nominated	
Boxoffice Magazine Awards	Best Picture of the Month for the Whole Family (July)	Charles Walters	Won	
Golden Globe Awards	Best Motion Picture – Musical or Comedy		Nominated	
Golden Globe Awards	Best Actress in a Motion Picture – Musical or Comedy	Debbie Reynolds	Nominated	
Golden Globe Awards	New Star of the Year – Actor	Harve Presnell	Won	
Golden Reel Awards	Best Sound Editing – Dialogue		Won (Note: Tied with Fate Is the Hunter.)	
Laurel Awards	Top Musical		Won	
Laurel Awards	Top Male Musical Performance	Harve Presnell	Nominated	
Laurel Awards	Top Female Musical Performance	Debbie Reynolds	Nominated	
Laurel Awards	Top Male Supporting Performance	Ed Begley	Nominated	
Photoplay Awards	Gold Medal		Won	
Writers Guild of America Awards	Best Written American Musical	Helen Deutsch	Nominated	

== Home media ==
Warner Home Video released the Region 1 DVD on September 19, 2000. The film is in anamorphic widescreen format with an audio track in English and subtitles in English and French. In 2016, Warner Archive released the film on Blu-ray.
