= The Saxon Charm =

1948 film by Claude Binyon

- 1948 theatrical poster
- Directed by: Claude Binyon
- Written by: Frederic Wakeman, Sr. (novel)
- Screenplay by: Claude Binyon
- Produced by: Joseph Sistrom
- Starring: Robert Montgomery; Susan Hayward; John Payne; Audrey Totter
- Cinematography: Milton R. Krasner
- Edited by: Paul Weatherwax
- Music by: Walter Scharf
- Production company: Universal Pictures
- Distributed by: Universal Pictures
- Release date: September 29, 1948 (New York City)
- Running time: 88 minutes
- Country: United States
- Language: English

The Saxon Charm is a 1948 American film noir drama film written and directed by Claude Binyon based on the novel of the same name by Frederic Wakeman Sr. and starring Robert Montgomery, Susan Hayward, John Payne and Audrey Totter.

== Plot ==
In a hospital, theatrical producer Matt Saxon is introduced to writer Eric Busch, and ends up offering to produce Eric's new play with financing from millionaire Zack Humber.

Alma Wragge, a singer, is Saxon's girlfriend, but she warns Eric's wife Janet about the producer's notorious "Saxon charm" that coaxes others into doing his bidding, only to end up badly for everyone involved. Sure enough, Saxon's behavior soon ruins Alma's nightclub audition.

It isn't long before Saxon makes a pest of himself, interrupting a beach vacation Eric and Janet take, closing the show after a poor review, then persuading Eric to go off by himself to do rewrites. Saxon loses the financial backing of Humber so he works on his ex-wife, Vivian, to put up the money, not knowing she is broke.

Alma gets a chance to be in a Hollywood movie, but Saxon interferes with that as well. Janet, upset by Eric's absences, begins drinking and threatens to leave him. Eric finally punches Saxon, whose destructive nature contributes to his ex-wife's suicide but of which he appears to be unaware. Eric and Janet get away from him just in time.

== Cast ==
- Robert Montgomery as Matt Saxon
- Susan Hayward as Janet Busch
- John Payne as Eric Busch
- Audrey Totter as Alma Wragge
- Harry Morgan as Hermy (as Harry Morgan)
- Harry von Zell as Zack Humber
- Cara Williams as Dolly Humber
- Chill Wills as Captain Chatham
- Heather Angel as Vivian Saxon
- Ed Agresti as Guest At Mexican Inn (uncredited)
- Fay Baker as Mrs. Noble (uncredited)
- John Baragrey as Peter Stanhope (uncredited)
- Archie Twitchell as Mr. Maddox (uncredited)
- Barbara Billingsley as Mrs. Maddox (uncredited)
- Peter Brocco as Cyril Leatham (uncredited)
- Kathleen Freeman as Nurse (uncredited)

== See also ==
- List of American films of 1948
