= Kismet (musical) =

1953 US musical by Charles Lederer and Luther Davis

- Original logo
- Music: Alexander Borodin; Adapted by: Robert Wright; George Forrest
- Lyrics: Robert Wright; George Forrest
- Book: Charles Lederer; Luther Davis
- Basis: Play by Edward Knoblock
- Productions: 1953 Broadway; 1955 West End; 2007 English National Opera
- Awards: Tony Award for Best Musical

Kismet is a musical adapted by Charles Lederer and Luther Davis from the play Kismet (1911) by Edward Knoblock, with lyrics and musical adaptation (as well as some original music) by Robert Wright and George Forrest. The music was mostly adapted from several pieces composed by Alexander Borodin. The story concerns a wily poet who talks his way out of trouble several times; meanwhile, his beautiful daughter meets and falls in love with the young caliph.

The musical was first produced on Broadway in 1953 and won the Tony Award for best musical in 1954. It was also successful in London's West End and has been given several revivals. A 1955 film version was produced by Metro-Goldwyn-Mayer.

== Background ==
The musical was commissioned by Edwin Lester, founder and director of the Los Angeles Civic Light Opera, who conceived of a musical based on the 1911 play Kismet by Edward Knoblock. Lester had previously produced Song of Norway, with the same composing team, adapting the melodies of Edvard Grieg. For Kismet, the writers seized upon the music of Alexander Borodin, which they felt had a suitable exotic flavor and lush melodies. Four film versions of the play were made before the creation of the musical, including a 1944 film produced by Metro-Goldwyn-Mayer, directed by William Dieterle and starring Ronald Colman as Hafiz and Marlene Dietrich as Jamille.

== Synopsis ==
Kismet is set in a fictional Baghdad in the times of The Arabian Nights.

=== Act 1 ===
At a mosque, an imam prays as the sun rises ("The Sands of Time"). Three beggars sit outside the temple, but the fourth, Hajj, has gone to Mecca. Crying "Rhymes! Fine Rhymes!", a poet enters to sell his verses. His beautiful daughter Marsinah joins in the sales pitch, but they have no success ("Rhymes Have I"). Marsinah is sent to steal oranges in the Bazaar for their breakfast, while her father sits down to beg. When the beggars object to the poet's taking Hajj's place, he claims to be a cousin of Hajj. The poet threatens to curse those who do not give him money and soon earns a few coins ("Fate"). Hassen-Ben, a huge man from the desert, mistakes him for Hajj and kidnaps him. The poet (who is referred to as Hajj thereafter) is taken to Jawan, a notorious brigand. Fifteen years ago, the real Hajj had placed a curse on Jawan that resulted in the disappearance of the brigand's little son. Now he wants the curse removed. The new Hajj, seeing an opportunity to make some money, promises to do so for 100 gold pieces. Jawan leaves for Baghdad to search for his son, and Hajj rejoices in his new-found riches ("Fate" (reprise)).

Back in the city, the wazir of police comes through the busy bazaar ("Bazaar of the Caravans"). The evil wazir and his seductive, beautiful wife-of-wives, Lalume, discuss a loan he desperately needs. In return for the money lent from the king of Ababu, the wazir must arrange for the caliph to marry one (or all three) of the princesses of Ababu, who perform a sexy dance. Through their amah, the princesses tell Lalume that they wish to return home. Lalume convinces them that Baghdad is much more exciting than any other place on earth ("Not Since Nineveh").

Marsinah is being pursued by a fruit merchant whose wares she has stolen. Her father arrives to rescue her, giving the man money. Hajj gives his daughter half of the money and leaves. The merchants set out their finest "Baubles, Bangles and Beads" for the young lady. The young caliph and his advisor, Omar Khayyam, have been traveling incognito. He is struck by Marsinah's beauty and follows her. Elsewhere, Hajj is basking in the glow of some scantily-dressed slave girls he has just bought, when he is stopped by the police, who are checking identities because they are looking for Jawan. The Chief recognizes, on the coins, the crest of a family Jawan has robbed and arrests Hajj as a thief. Meanwhile, Marsinah has found a quaint little house with a beautiful garden to buy for her father and herself. She is admiring the garden when the Caliph slips in and, pretending to be a gardener, introduces himself to her. They fall in love on the spot ("Stranger in Paradise"). They promise to meet again in the garden at moonrise. The Caliph tells Omar that he has fallen in love, which is overheard by the princesses of Ababu; they are furious that he seems to ignore them, but the Chief Policeman reassures them that "He's in Love".

At the wazir's palace, Hajj is on trial for the theft of 100 pieces of gold. The wazir has no need for evidence; he sentences Hajj to 20 lashes, and his right hand is to be cut off. The poet pleads that, as a poet and storyteller, the loss of a hand would cripple his career; it is the gesture that tells the story ("Gesticulate"). The lovely Lalume, attracted to the handsome poet, begs her husband for forgiveness, but the Wazir is not convinced and orders his guards to drag Hajj off to punishment. As Hajj curses the wazir, a guard bursts in with news that they have captured Jawan. The old brigand is brought in and asks Hajj where his son is. He sees, around the wazir's neck, a medallion that his son was wearing when he was captured. The wazir is his son! Jawan praises the power of the great magician, Hajj, a man who has the power to curse and uncurse. Jawan is thrilled to see his son, but the Wazir sentences his own father to death. "For the leading judge of Mesopotamia to have as a father the leading criminal of Mesopotamia," he says, is "a disturbing thought."

As Jawan is led to his execution, the wazir realizes that the "powerful magician" has cursed him. Just when he is about to murder Hajj, the caliph enters with news that he has found a bride, a commoner, and that he will marry her tonight. The wazir is distraught: if the caliph does not marry a princess of Ababu, the wazir will be ruined. He concludes that this is a result of Hajj's curse and begs Hajj to reverse the situation, promising him a reprieve and the title of Emir. Hajj agrees. Lalume knows that the poet is no wizard, but she decides that he may be her chance out of a dull life ("Bored") and is falling in love with him; she promises to help. When the wazir returns, Hajj sings a mystic-sounding invocation to fate as the slave-girls dance wildly, distracting the wazir. Hajj jumps out of a window, leaving his coat behind him. When the wazir sees he is gone, he clutches the cloak in amazement and faints.

=== Act 2 ===
The caliph and his wedding procession approach the house of his beloved ("Night of my Nights"). Inside, Marsinah thinks only of her gardener ("Stranger in Paradise" (reprise)). Hajj enters and tells her of his situation and says that they must flee immediately to Damascus, but Marsinah refuses to go. They argue, and he nearly strikes her before he runs off, ashamed. She departs in the opposite direction. When the caliph enters the garden, his love is not there.

The wazir is informed by his spies that the caliph's bride has disappeared. He rejoices at the power he wields, by having a magician as Emir ("Was I Wazir?"). He instructs Lalume to keep his new Emir happy, and she is eager to comply ("Rahadlakum"). Hajj and Lalume are discussing a trip to a "small oasis, a week's travel by camel" when Marsinah enters the Harem. Father and daughter reconcile, and she tells him of her lover and asks him to find him. At the same time, the caliph, in the next room, orders the wazir to find his love ("And This Is My Beloved"). Hajj and Omar encounter each other and engage in a battle of wits ("The Olive Tree").

The wazir, hoping to convince the caliph that only wanting one wife is just a phase, shows him his harem through a peephole where he sees Marsinah. The caliph is horrified that his love is a member of the wazir's Harem, and the wazir, sure that Hajj has arranged the whole thing, claims that she is one of his wives. The caliph, heartbroken, agrees to choose his wife-of-wives that night during his diwan. So as not to have lied to his prince, the wazir immediately marries Marsinah, promising to visit her that night. She vows to kill herself if he does.

That night, at the caliph's diwan, the candidates for his hand dance for him: Princess Zubbediya of Damascus, Princess Samaris of Bangalore, and the three Ababu princesses. The caliph is unmoved. Hajj is searching for Marsinah; the wazir thanks the "wizard" for placing the caliph's beloved in his own harem. Laughing, he tells him that he has married the pretty little Marsinah. Realizing what has happened, Hajj pulls a knife, but has a better idea. He takes a blank plaque and throws it in a pool, proclaiming that when it is retrieved, it will read the name of the caliph's fated bride. He secretly gives the wazir another tablet, this one with the name Ababu written on it, and tells him to substitute it for the tablet from the pool. When the wazir enters the pool, Hajj trips him and holds him underwater until he drowns.

Hajj explains all to the caliph, who is joyfully reunited with Marsinah. The caliph is ready to pardon Hajj for his murder of a public official, but the poet requests, as his punishment, to be "banished to some dreadful oasis ... at least a week's journey away by camel," and to be made to comfort the wazir's widow in her "grief". As the two couples unite, the poet reflects on the fleetingness of "The Sands of Time".

== Roles and original Broadway cast ==
- Hajj – Alfred Drake
- The Wazir of Police – Henry Calvin
- Lalume – Joan Diener
- The Caliph – Richard Kiley
- Marsinah (Hajj's Daughter) – Doretta Morrow
- Chief Policeman – Tom Charlesworth
- Omar – Philip Coolidge
- Jawan – Truman Gaige
- Princess Samaris of Bangalore – Beatrice Kraft
- Ayah to Samaris – Thelma Dare
- Princess Zubbediya of Damascus – Florence Lessing
- Ayah to Zubbediya – Lucy Andonian

== Musical numbers ==
Act 1

- "Sands of Time" – Imam of the Mosque
- "Rhymes Have I" – Hajj and Marsinah
- "My Magic Lamp" - Marsinah†
- "Fate" – Hajj
- "Bazaar of the Caravans" – Street Dancer, Akbar, Assiz, Merchants and Shoppers
- "Not Since Nineveh" – Lalume, The Wazir of Police, Three Princesses of Ababu, Akbar, Assiz, Merchants and Shoppers
- "Baubles, Bangles and Beads" – Marsinah
- "Stranger in Paradise"* – Caliph and Marsinah
- "He's in Love!" – Chief Policeman, Second Policeman, Prosecutor, Three Princesses of Ababu, Akbar, Assiz, Caliph and Omar
- "Gesticulate" – Hajj and Wazir's Council
- "Bored"† – Lalume
- "Fate" (Reprise) – Hajj and Ladies of the Wazir's Harem

Act 2

- "Night of My Nights" – Caliph and Entourage
- "Stranger in Paradise" (Reprise) – Marsinah
- "Baubles, Bangles, and Beads" (Reprise) – The Caliph
- "He's in Love!" (Reprise) – Entourage
- "Was I Wazir?" – The Wazir of Police, Policemen and Guards
- "Rahadlakum"* – Hajj, Lalume, Princess Zubbediya of Damascus, Princess Samaris of Bangalore, Three Princesses and Wazir's Harem
- "And This Is My Beloved" – Marsinah, Caliph, Hajj and The Wazir of Police
- "The Olive Tree" – Hajj
- "Ceremonial of the Caliph's Diwan" – Diwan Dancers
- "Presentation of Princesses" – Princess Zubbediya of Damascus, Ayah, Princess Samaris of Bangalore and Three Princesses of Ababu
- "Finale" – Ensemble and Hajj

†Wright and Forrest composed the music for the bridge in "Stranger in Paradise" as well as the music for "Rahadlakum." The music for the latter was originally used in the Wright and Forrest song "I'm Going Moroccan for Johnny."

== Borodin source material ==
According to Richard E. Rodda in his 2008 liner notes to recordings of Borodin works, Robert Wright and George Forrest specialized in "turning melodies from classical music into film scores and popular songs". The following Borodin works were used as musical sources for Kismet:

- In the Steppes of Central Asia ("Sands of Time")
- Symphony No. 2, Movement 1 ("Fate")
- "Polovtsian Dances" from Prince Igor ("Bazaar of Caravans", "Not Since Nineveh", "Stranger in Paradise", "He's in Love", "Samaris' Dance")
- String Quartet No. 2, Movement 2 ("Baubles, Bangles and Beads"), Movement 3 ("And This Is My Beloved")
- String Quartet No. 1, Movement 4 ("Was I Wazir?")
- Symphony No. 1, Movement 4 ("Gesticulate")
- "Serenade" from the Petite Suite ("Night of My Nights")
- Act III trio from Prince Igor ("The Olive Tree")
- "Aria of Khan Konchak" from Prince Igor (Introduction to "Gesticulate")
- "Aria of Vladimir Galitsky" from Prince Igor ("Zubbediya")
- Act II scene with Ovlur from Prince Igor ("My Magic Lamp")

== Productions ==
=== Original production ===
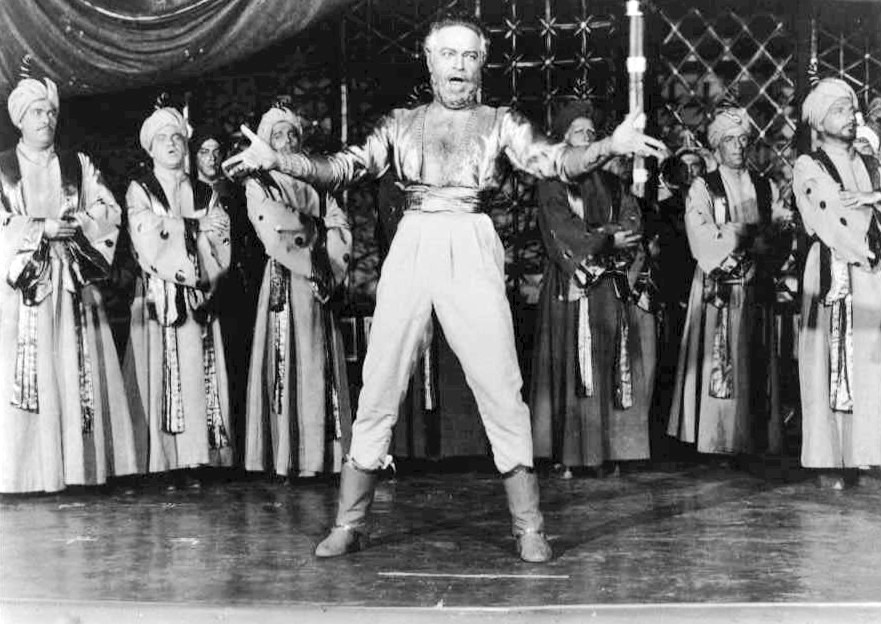
Alfred Drake as Hajj, 1954

Kismet premiered in Los Angeles and then moved to San Francisco in the summer and autumn of 1953. A successful change during the tryouts was to transform the character of Hajj from being merely a beggar to also being a poet. Charles Lederer became producer as well as book writer. The production moved to Broadway on December 3, 1953, playing at the Ziegfeld Theatre. The director was Albert Marre, with choreography by Jack Cole and sumptuous settings and costumes by Lemuel Ayers. The original cast starred Alfred Drake as the poet Hajj, Doretta Morrow as his daughter Marsinah, Richard Kiley as the young Caliph of Baghdad, Henry Calvin as the Wazir and Joan Diener as Lalume, the vampy wife of the evil Wazir. Bodybuilder Steve Reeves played the wizard's guard, a mute role. Bill Johnson later took over the role of Hajj, and Elaine Malbin the role of Marsinah.

The show opened on Broadway in the midst of a newspaper strike, and since newspaper reviews were unavailable, the producers used television advertising to promote the show. The musical caught the popular attention and ran for a successful 583 performances, winning the 1954 Tony Award for Best Musical. The strike may have ultimately assisted the popularity of the show, since the reviews, arriving a few weeks after the opening, were not all favorable. The critic of Time magazine, punning on the name of the composer Borodin, disparaged the score as "a lot of borrowed din." Walter Kerr wrote that "It's the sort of show that would sell its soul for a joke, and the jokes should be better at the price." William Hawkins, however, wrote that it was "noisy, spectacular, and vigorous. ... It is melodic and gay". Bloom and Vlastnik noted that it was the score that made the show successful, as the songs "Stranger in Paradise" and "Baubles, Bangles and Beads" were "huge hits on radio, television and records."

=== West End and Australian premieres ===
Kismet was even more successful in London's West End, enjoying a 648 performance run at the Stoll Theatre commencing in April 1955. The London production opened with the three stars of the Broadway cast, Drake, Morrow and Diener. They were subsequently replaced by Tudor Evans, Elizabeth Larner and Sheila Bradley, respectively.

The first Australian production opened at the Princess Theatre, Melbourne in November 1955, featuring Hayes Gordon and directed by American Burry Fredrik. It played over a year in Melbourne and Sydney.

=== Subsequent productions ===
The musical was revived at Lincoln Center's New York State Theater, starting on June 22, 1965, for 39 performances and starring Drake, Lee Venora, Anne Jeffreys, and Henry Calvin.

The New York City Opera presented the musical in October 1985, featuring George Hearn (Hajj), Susanne Marsee (Lalume) and Maryanne Telese (Marsinah) with direction by Frank Corsaro. In 1994, BBC Radio 2 broadcast a complete production starring Ethan Freeman as Hajj, Julia Migenes as Lalume, Stephen Hill as the Caliph, Katrina Murphy as Marsinah, Frank Middlemass as Omar Kayyam and David Adler as the Wazir, with the BBC Concert Orchestra, conducted by Kenneth Alwyn. The production was re-broadcast on 13 August 2016.

Jettisoning the lush oriental context and physical production of the original, a restaging re-titled as Timbuktu! opened at the Mark Hellinger Theatre on March 1, 1978, and ran for 243 performances. This version, with a new book by Luther Davis, set the story in Africa, with minimalist settings and an all-Black cast. Plot emphasis was shifted, with increased emphasis given to Lalume (renamed Shaleem-La-Lume), played by Eartha Kitt opposite William Marshall and Melba Moore. Two new songs were written for the production: "Since the Beginning, Women" and "Golden Land, Golden Life."

The New York City Center Encores! series presented a staged concert in February 2006, starring Brian Stokes Mitchell and Marin Mazzie. The musical was revived in 2007 by the English National Opera at the London Coliseum and starred Michael Ball, Faith Prince and Alfie Boe.

=== Films and television ===
The musical was made into a Cinemascope film in 1955 by MGM, directed by Vincente Minnelli and starring Howard Keel as Hajj, Ann Blyth as Marsinah, Dolores Gray as Lalume, and Vic Damone as the Caliph. The quartet "This is My Beloved" was changed to a trio, because Sebastian Cabot, who played the Wazir, could not sing.

An Armstrong Circle Theater TV version premiered on ABC in 1967 starring Barbara Eden as Lalume, José Ferrer as Hajj, Anna Maria Alberghetti as Marsinah, and George Chakiris as the Caliph. The script was edited down to fit the 90-minute broadcast, but it cut few musical numbers.

== Recordings ==
Columbia Masterworks Records recorded the original Broadway cast in late 1953; the recording was later reissued on CD by Masterworks Broadway Records.

Other recordings of the musical include a 1961 London studio recording by World Record Club conducted by Kenneth Alwyn with Graham Laver (Hajj), Elizabeth Harwood (Marsinah), Peter Grant (Caliph), Diana Landor (Lalume), Paul Whitsun-Jones (Wazir) and Hazel Holt. A 1964 Decca recording was conducted by Mantovani with Robert Merrill (Hajj), Adele Leigh (Marsinah), Kenneth McKellar (Caliph), Regina Resnik (Lalume), Ian Wallace (Wazir) and The Mike Sammes Singers. An abridged 1964 Capitol version was conducted by Van Alexander with Gordon MacRae as Hajj and the Caliph, Dorothy Kirsten (Marsinah), Bunny Bishop (Lalume), Johnny Guarnieri, Richard Levitt, Salli Terri and the Roger Wagner Chorale.

A 1989 recording on Jay Records that includes some songs from the film version and Timbuktu! as bonus tracks was conducted by John Owen Edwards with Donald Maxwell (Hajj), Valerie Masterson (Marsinah), David Rendall (Caliph), Judy Kaye (Lalume), Richard Van Allan (Wazir), Bonaventura Bottone and Rosemary Ashe. A 1991 Sony Broadway version with new orchestrations by conductor Paul Gemignani stars Samuel Ramey (Hajj), Ruth Ann Swenson (Marsinah), Jerry Hadley (Caliph), Julia Migenes (Lalume), Dom DeLuise (Wazir) and Mandy Patinkin (Marriage arranger).

== Awards and nominations ==
=== Original Broadway production ===
Year	Award Ceremony	Category	Nominee	Result
1954	Tony Award	Best Musical		Won
1954	Tony Award	Best Performance by a Leading Actor in a Musical	Alfred Drake	Won
1954	Tony Award	Best Conductor and Musical Director	Louis Adrian	Won

== Sources ==
- Borodin, A. Le Prince Igor. Partition pour chant et piano. Edition M.P. Belaieff. (Russian, French, and German text.)
- Rodda, Richard E. Ravel, Borodin, Bizet. Liner notes to CD recording by Cincinnati Pops Orchestra. 2008, Telarc CD-80703
