= Amy Douglass =

American actress

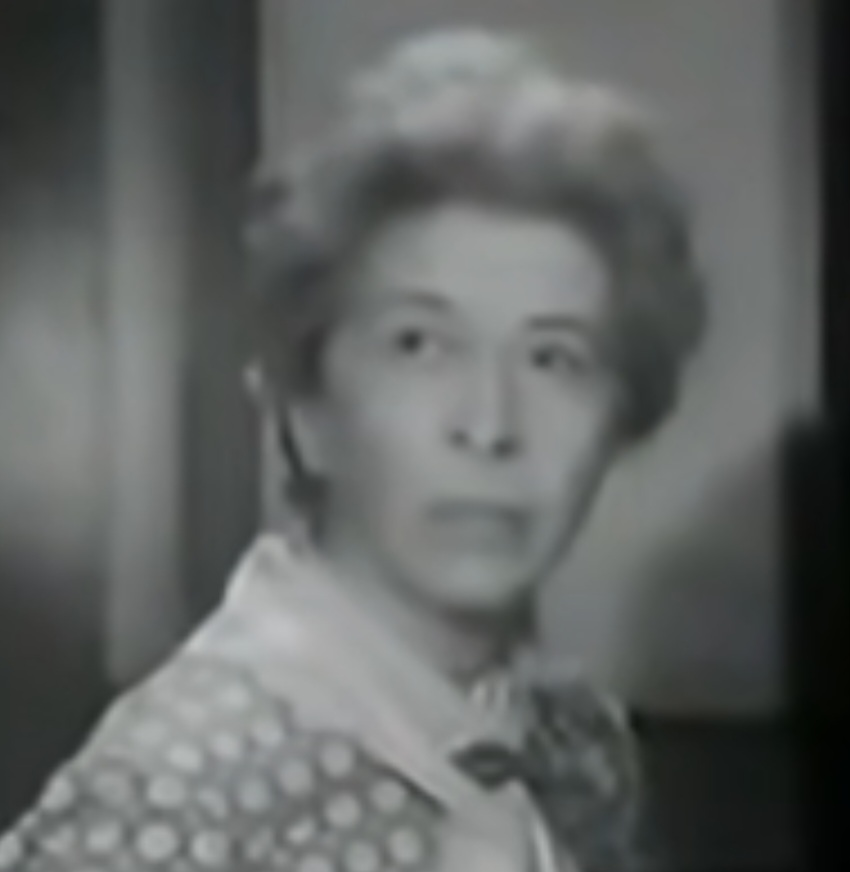
- Amy Douglass in an episode of One Step Beyond (1960)
- Born: December 21, 1902; Mansfield, Ohio, U.S.
- Died: March 5, 1980 (aged 77); Los Angeles, California, U.S.
- Occupation: Actress
- Years active: 1950–1977

Amy Douglass (December 21, 1902 – March 5, 1980) was an American actress.

Her works as a film actress include The Unsinkable Molly Brown (1964), Duel (1971), and Close Encounters of the Third Kind (1977). She also worked on television, appearing in episodes of 77 Sunset Strip and Ben Casey.

== Biography ==
Douglass was born in Mansfield, Ohio on December 21, 1902.

After having performed at Rowe's Theater in Mansfield, Douglass acted at the Cleveland Play House beginning in 1932 and continuing into the 1940s. She had the only female role in Heavenly Express (1935). In 1943, a newspaper review wrote of her performance of Lorinda Channing in Invitation to a Murder: "Miss Douglass giver her power, a curious mad charm, a magnetic malignancy."

In 1950 she appeared on television in episodes of Actors Studio, Suspicion, The Thin Man and Alfred Hitchcock Presents during the 1950s and in Please Don't Eat the Daisies, Dennis the Menace, Stoney Burke, and Thriller during the 1960s.

She also appeared in films like The Unsinkable Molly Brown as Mrs. Fitzgerald, in Duel as an old woman in car, and in Close Encounters of the Third Kind as implantee.

Douglass's Broadway credits include Kiss Them for Me (1945), Crime and Punishment (1947), Life with Mother (1948), and Mr. Barry's Etchings (1950).

== Personal life and death ==
Douglass was married to Marion Douglass, a physician. They were divorced in 1936. She died in Los Angeles, California, on March 5, 1980.

== Selected filmography ==
=== Film ===
- Please Don't Eat the Daisies (1960) - Martha (uncredited)
- Where the Boys Are (1960) - Dr. Raunch (uncredited)
- All in a Night's Work (1961) - Dowager (uncredited)
- Ada (1961) - Mrs. Bradville (uncredited)
- The Unsinkable Molly Brown (1964) - Mrs. Fitzgerald
- Duel (1971, TV movie) - Old Woman in Car
- Close Encounters of the Third Kind (1977) - Implantee #1

=== Television ===
- Actors Studio (1950)
- Suspicion (1958) - Jean, Markham's Secretary
- The Thin Man (1959) - Lucy Van Horn
- Alfred Hitchcock Presents (1959) (Season 5 Episode 3: "Appointment at Eleven") - Mrs. Logan
- Dennis the Menace (1960) - Mrs. Toland
- Window on Main Street (1961) (Episode: "The Haunted House") - Grandma
- 77 Sunset Strip (1962) - Mrs. Gray
- Thriller (1962) - Mrs. Carson
- Ben Casey (1962)
- Stoney Burke (1963) - Miss Sherry
- The Invaders (1967) - Mrs. Wilk
