= Overbrook, Kansas =

City in Osage County, Kansas

- City
- Location within Osage County and Kansas

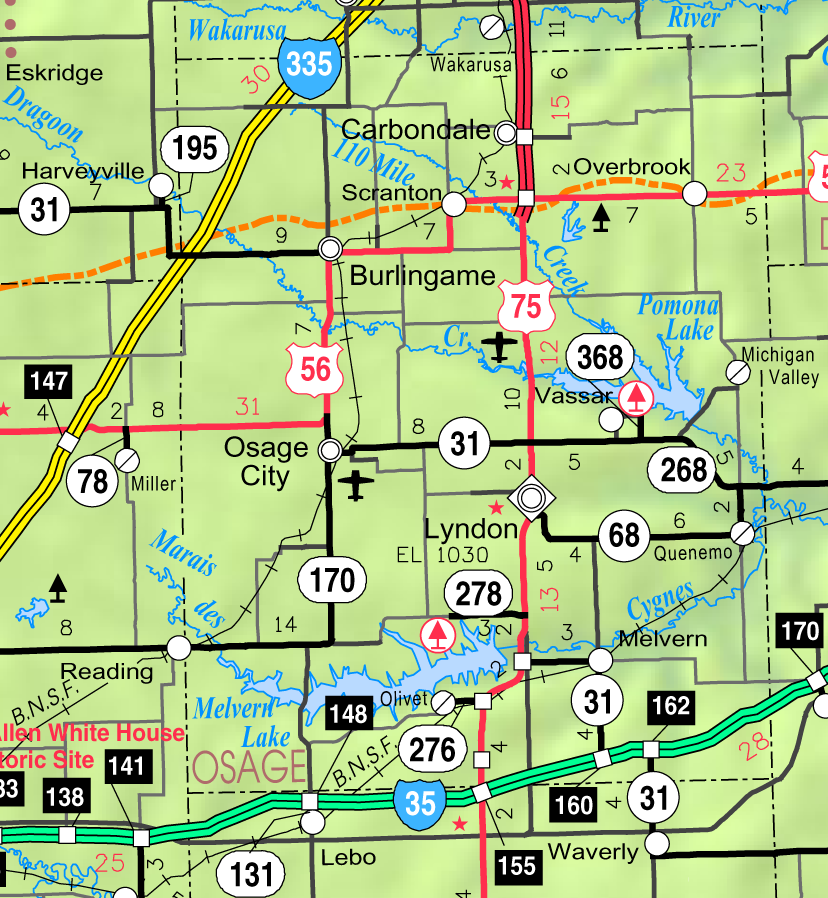
- KDOT map of Osage County (legend)
- Coordinates: 38°46′48″N 95°33′26″W
- Country: United States
- State: Kansas
- County: Osage
- Founded: 1888
- Incorporated: 1948
- Named for: Overbrook, Philadelphia

Area
  - Total: 0.54 sq mi (1.41 km^{2})
  - Land: 0.54 sq mi (1.41 km^{2})
  - Water: 0 sq mi (0.00 km^{2})
- Elevation: 1,204 ft (367 m)

Population (2020)
  - Total: 1,005
  - Density: 1,850/sq mi (713/km^{2})
- Time zone: UTC-6 (CST)
  - Summer (DST): UTC-5 (CDT)
- ZIP Code: 66524
- Area code: 785
- FIPS code: 20-53725
- GNIS ID: 479465
- Website: overbrookks.com

Overbrook is a city in Osage County, Kansas, United States. As of the 2020 census, the population of the city was 1,005.

== History ==
The Santa Fe Trail passed through the Overbrook area, and ruts can still be seen at certain locations in and around the city.

Overbrook was founded in 1886 when William T. Coffman and Jasper B. Fairchild each donated 30 acres toward the building of a city. It is named after Overbrook, Pennsylvania, the home town of a railroad construction engineer.

== Geography ==
Overbrook is located at 38°46′48″N 95°33′26″W (38.779969, -95.557202). According to the United States Census Bureau, the city has a total area of 0.55 square miles (1.42 km^{2}), all land.

=== Climate ===
The climate in this area is characterized by hot, humid summers and generally mild to cool winters. According to the Köppen Climate Classification system, Overbrook has a humid subtropical climate, abbreviated "Cfa" on climate maps.

== Demographics ==
Historical population
Census	Pop.	Note	%±
1890	172		—
1950	387		—
1960	509		31.5%
1970	748		47.0%
1980	930		24.3%
1990	920		−1.1%
2000	947		2.9%
2010	1,058		11.7%
2020	1,005		−5.0%
U.S. Decennial Census

Overbrook is part of the Topeka, Kansas Metropolitan Statistical Area.

=== 2020 census ===
The 2020 United States census counted 1,005 people, 414 households, and 264 families in Overbrook. The population density was 1,847.4 per square mile (713.3/km^{2}). There were 440 housing units at an average density of 808.8 per square mile (312.3/km^{2}). The racial makeup was 93.03% (935) white or European American (92.04% non-Hispanic white), 0.3% (3) black or African-American, 0.7% (7) Native American or Alaska Native, 0.5% (5) Asian, 0.0% (0) Pacific Islander or Native Hawaiian, 0.1% (1) from other races, and 5.37% (54) from two or more races. Hispanic or Latino of any race was 3.18% (32) of the population.

Of the 414 households, 26.3% had children under the age of 18; 49.8% were married couples living together; 27.8% had a female householder with no spouse or partner present. 32.9% of households consisted of individuals and 16.9% had someone living alone who was 65 years of age or older. The average household size was 2.4 and the average family size was 2.9. The percent of those with a bachelor's degree or higher was estimated to be 11.2% of the population.

22.6% of the population was under the age of 18, 5.4% from 18 to 24, 20.1% from 25 to 44, 23.6% from 45 to 64, and 28.4% who were 65 years of age or older. The median age was 47.2 years. For every 100 females, there were 113.4 males. For every 100 females ages 18 and older, there were 116.7 males.

The 2016–2020 5-year American Community Survey estimates show that the median household income was $50,288 (with a margin of error of +/- $12,573) and the median family income was $59,167 (+/- $10,673). Males had a median income of $35,662 (+/- $7,677) versus $17,409 (+/- $6,276) for females. The median income for those above 16 years old was $30,488 (+/- $3,933). Approximately, 4.3% of families and 7.5% of the population were below the poverty line, including 13.0% of those under the age of 18 and 14.7% of those ages 65 or over.

=== 2010 census ===
As of the census of 2010, there were 1,058 people, 411 households, and 253 families residing in the city. The population density was 1,923.6 inhabitants per square mile (742.7/km^{2}). There were 448 housing units at an average density of 814.5 per square mile (314.5/km^{2}). The racial makeup of the city was 97.0% White, 0.3% African American, 1.4% Native American, 0.1% Asian, 0.2% from other races, and 1.0% from two or more races. Hispanic or Latino of any race were 1.2% of the population.

There were 411 households, of which 32.8% had children under the age of 18 living with them, 50.4% were married couples living together, 9.0% had a female householder with no husband present, 2.2% had a male householder with no wife present, and 38.4% were non-families. 35.8% of all households were made up of individuals, and 20.7% had someone living alone who was 65 years of age or older. The average household size was 2.41 and the average family size was 3.19.

The median age in the city was 41.7 years. 27.2% of residents were under the age of 18; 4.6% were between the ages of 18 and 24; 21.6% were from 25 to 44; 23.2% were from 45 to 64; and 23.5% were 65 years of age or older. The gender makeup of the city was 47.3% male and 52.7% female.

=== 2000 census ===
As of the census of 2000, there were 947 people, 367 households, and 255 families residing in the city. The population density was 1,714.1 inhabitants per square mile (661.8/km^{2}). There were 387 housing units at an average density of 700.5 per square mile (270.5/km^{2}). The racial makeup of the city was 97.15% White, 0.11% African American, 0.84% Native American, 1.06% from other races, and 0.84% from two or more races. Hispanic or Latino of any race were 1.48% of the population.

There were 367 households, out of which 29.7% had children under the age of 18 living with them, 59.4% were married couples living together, 6.8% had a female householder with no husband present, and 30.5% were non-families. 28.9% of all households were made up of individuals, and 17.2% had someone living alone who was 65 years of age or older. The average household size was 2.36 and the average family size was 2.90.

In the city, the population was spread out, with 22.5% under the age of 18, 6.7% from 18 to 24, 24.3% from 25 to 44, 22.1% from 45 to 64, and 24.5% who were 65 years of age or older. The median age was 43 years. For every 100 females, there were 79.7 males. For every 100 females age 18 and over, there were 76.9 males.

The median income for a household in the city was $37,772, and the median income for a family was $45,625. Males had a median income of $31,484 versus $25,625 for females. The per capita income for the city was $23,309. About 2.0% of families and 5.3% of the population were below the poverty line, including 4.7% of those under age 18 and 4.4% of those age 65 or over.

== Education ==
Overbook is served by Santa Fe Trail USD 434 public school district, which includes Carbondale, Overbrook, and Scranton. The district high school is Santa Fe Trail High School, opened in 1970. Previously the city had been served by the Overbrook Elementary School and the Overbrook Rural High School.

The Santa Fe Trail Chargers won the Kansas State High School boys class 4A basketball championship in 1997 and the girls class 4A basketball championship in 1998 as well as the 3A golf championship in 2021.

Overbrook Rural High School (ORHS) was closed through school unification. An annual all-class reunion for ORHS alumni continues to take place each year. The Overbrook High School mascot was the Overbrook Gophers.

== See also ==
- Santa Fe Trail
