= Frederic Wakeman, Sr. =

Frederic Wakeman
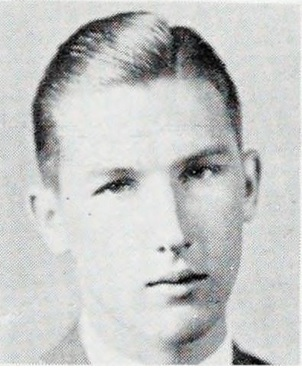
- Wakeman in college yearbook in 1933
- Born: December 26, 1909; Kansas
- Died: October 26, 1998 (aged 88); Stuart, Florida
- Occupation: Novelist
- Writing career
- Notable works: Shore Leave (1944), The Hucksters (1946)

Frederic Wakeman (December 26, 1909 – October 26, 1998) was an American novelist, best known for his best-selling 1946 novel The Hucksters, which was made into the 1947 film of the same name. He was also the father of East Asian history scholar Frederic Evans Wakeman Jr..

== Writing ==
Wakeman worked in the advertising industry until leaving to serve in the United States Navy in the Pacific from 1942 to 1943. Recovering in a naval hospital, he wrote his first novel, Shore Leave (1944), basing the character of Andy Crewson on an actual decorated naval aviator, It was adapted into the 1945 Broadway play Kiss Them for Me and 1957 film Kiss Them for Me.

His next novel, for which he became best known, The Hucksters (1946), about the radio advertising industry, spent 35 weeks in the top stratum of The New York Times Fiction bestseller list - including 19 weeks at #1, aided perhaps by its raunchy and racy content for its time. Life magazine called the book "last year's best-selling travesty" and even Clark Gable, who would eventually star in its film adaptation, said "It's filthy and it isn't entertainment." Life's and Gable's literary sensibilities to the contrary, Metro-Goldwyn-Mayer paid $200,000 for the motion picture rights before the novel was even published.

His third novel, The Saxon Charm (1947), was adapted to a film of the same name in 1948. The Wastrel (1949) was adapted to film in 1961, which starred his second wife, Greek actress Ellie Lambeti. He also wrote and directed the 1968 Italian film Mia mera, o pateras mou (One Day, My Daddy) starring Lambeti.

== Personal life ==
Wakeman was born in of Scranton, Kansas, and attended Park College in Parkville, Missouri, where he graduated from in 1933. He then worked on the Kansas City Journal Post before moving into advertising.

After the success of Shore Leave and The Hucksters, Wakeman became quite wealthy, and instead of continuing to shuttle between Kansas City and Manhattan, he moved his family to multiple places, including Mexico, Cuba, Bermuda, France, and Spain. His son Frederic Wakeman, Jr. would cite these experiences as very influential on him.

Judy Holliday starred in the play version of Shore Leave (Kiss Them for Me), and the two started an affair during its run. According to Holliday's 1982 biography by William Holtzman, the dedication in The Hucksters to "J.H.", (which Wakeman ascribed to theatrical producer Jed Harris, who he later based his novel The Saxon Charm on), was actually a dedication to Holliday, and claims she came up with the novel's title.

Wakeman had three children by his first marriage to Margaret (Keys) Hayes (d. 1994). Wakeman's second wife was Greek actress Ellie Lambeti, from 1959 to 1976. Their marriage was estranged in its later years, and was strained by their adoption of a daughter who later had to be returned to her birth parents after a court fight. The 2006-07 Greek television series I teleftaia parastasi portrayed Lambeti's life, in which Wakeman is portrayed by actor Aris Lempesopoulos.

Wakeman lived in Greece for 20 years. He died in Stuart, Florida in 1998 at the age of 88. His ashes were scattered at sea. Before his death, he wrote a fictionalized account of his life called Reminiscent Bells, which has never been published. Dying 50 years after his greatest writing success, his death did not gain much notice outside his local Florida newspaper, The Stuart News. James Twitchell, an English professor at the University of Florida noted at his death that The Hucksters was "really influential because it started this whole movement of seeing advertisers as devious, deceptive, diabolical and as encouraging a kind of duplicity that straightforward American culture should abhor." In that same reporting, his daughter described him as not caring about fame, and being "more of a loner", "He just liked to travel and write."

== Bibliography ==
- Shore Leave (1944)
- The Hucksters (1946)
- The Saxon Charm (1947)
- The Wastrel (1949)
- The Mandrake Root (1953)
- The Fabulous Train (1955)
- Deluxe Tour (1956)
- Verginia Q (1959)
- The Fault of the Apple (1961)
- A Free Agent (1963)
- The Flute Across the Pond (1966)
