= Luther Davis =

American dramatist (1916–2008)

Luther Berryhill Davis (August 29, 1916 – July 29, 2008) was an American playwright and screenwriter. Over a span of 45 years, Davis worked extensively in theater, television and film, but is probably best remembered for his Tony Award winning book for the 1953 musical Kismet and the screenplay for the 1955 film adaptation.

== Early life and education ==
Davis was born in Brooklyn, New York. He graduated from Culver Military Academy in 1934 and received a Bachelor of Arts from Yale College in 1938. He served in the United States Army Air Forces until 1945, rising to the rank of major. While in the army air forces, he served in Asia and Europe.

== Career ==
In collaboration with Charles Lederer, Robert Wright, and George Forrest, Luther Davis wrote Kismet, Timbuktu!, and two different treatments of Vicki Baum’s novel Grand Hotel (At the Grand for the Los Angeles and San Francisco Light Opera Association and the Broadway musical version, Grand Hotel, The Musical).

He received two Tony Awards in 1954 (with Lederer) for Kismet as Best Author (Musical) and as co-author of the book contributed to the Best Musical win. He was nominated again in 1978, for Most Innovative Production of a Revival, as producer of Timbuktu!, and in 1990 as author of the Best Book (Musical) for Grand Hotel, The Musical.

He wrote fifteen movies, many television specials and co-produced Stephen MacDonald’s Off-Broadway play, Not About Heroes.

He won two Mystery Writers of America Edgar Awards and was nominated many times by the Writers Guild of America and the League of American Theatres and Producers.

Davis worked frequently in television, especially in the 1960s and early 1970s, with credits on shows ranging from The Addams Family to Columbo. Davis also created two short-lived series: the 1966 comedy The Double Life of Henry Phyfe starring Red Buttons, and the 1970 espionage drama The Silent Force. Davis occasionally used the pen name Paul Tuckahoe on his television work, especially if it had been rewritten by others.

He was the father of two daughters and was married to soap opera actress Jennifer Bassey, his companion since 1978, from 2004 until his death.

== Credits ==
=== Stage plays ===
- Kiss Them for Me (March 20, 1945 – June 23, 1945)
- New Faces of 1952 (May 16, 1952 – March 28, 1953)
- Kismet (December 3, 1953 – April 23, 1955)
- At The Grand (1958) - closed prior to a planned Broadway run
- Timbuktu! (March 1, 1978 – September 10, 1978) - a reworked version of Kismet
- Grand Hotel (November 12, 1989 – April 25, 1992) - a reworked version of At The Grand

=== Screenplays ===
- The Hucksters (1947)
- B.F.'s Daughter (1948)
- Black Hand (1950)
- A Lion Is in the Streets (1953)
- New Faces (1954)
- Kismet (1955)
- The Eternal Sea (1955)
- The Gift of Love (1958)
- Holiday for Lovers (1959)
- Le Meraviglie Di Aladino (1961)
- Lady in a Cage (1964)
- Daughter of the Mind (1969)
- The Old Man Who Cried Wolf (1970)
- Across 110th Street (1972)

NOTE: The film version of Kiss Them for Me (1957) was based on Davis' stage play (which in turn was based on a novel by Frederic Wakeman Sr.), but Davis had no part in writing the screenplay, which was by Julius J. Epstein.

=== Television series ===
- Schlitz Playhouse of Stars (writer, 3 episodes) (1952)
- Bourbon Street Beat (writer, episode "Woman In The River") (1959)
- Startime (writer, episode "Crime, Inc.") (1960)
- Westinghouse Playhouse (writer, episode "Moth Trap") (1961)
- Bus Stop (teleplays, two episodes) (1961)
- Target: The Corruptors (writer, episode "Touch Of Evil") (1961)
- 87th Precinct (teleplay, episode "Killer's Choice") (1962)
- The Lloyd Bridges Show (writer, episode "My Child Is Yet A Stranger") (1962)
- Combat! (writer, 2 episodes) (1963)
- Kraft Suspense Theatre (teleplays for multiple episodes) (1963–65, frequently as Paul Tuckahoe)
- The Man From U.N.C.L.E. (story, episode "The Tigers Are Coming Affair") (1965, as Paul Tuckahoe)
- Run For Your Life (writer, multiple episodes) (1965–67, occasionally as Paul Tuckahoe)
- The Double Life of Henry Phyfe (creator, writer) (1966)
- The Addams Family (writer, episode "Cat Addams") (1966, as Paul Tuckahoe)
- Bob Hope Presents The Chrysler Theatre (writer, episode "One Embezzlement and Two Margaritas") (1966)
- Ironside (writer, episode "A Very Cool Hot Car") (1967)
- It Takes A Thief (writer, episode "Get Me To The Revolution On Time") (1968, as Paul Tuckahoe)
- The Name of the Game (teleplay, episode "The White Birch") (1968)
- The Silent Force (creator, writer) (1970–71)
- Cade's County (writer, episode "Safe Deposit") (1971)
- Baretta (story, episode "Think Mink") (1977, as Paul Tuckahoe)
- Columbo (teleplay, episode "Try and Catch Me") (1977, as Paul Tuckahoe)
