= Kiss Them for Me (film) =

1957 film by Stanley Donen

- Theatrical release poster
- Directed by: Stanley Donen
- Screenplay by: Julius Epstein
- Based on: Kiss Them for Me; 1945 play by Luther Davis; Shore Leave; 1944 novel by Frederic Wakeman, Sr.
- Produced by: Jerry Wald
- Starring: Cary Grant; Jayne Mansfield; Suzy Parker; Leif Erickson
- Cinematography: Milton R. Krasner
- Edited by: Robert L. Simpson
- Music by: Lionel Newman; Cyril J. Mockridge
- Production company: Jerry Wald Productions
- Distributed by: Twentieth Century Fox Film Corporation
- Release date: December 10, 1957 (United States)
- Running time: 105 minutes
- Country: United States
- Language: English
- Budget: $1.94 million
- Box office: $1.8 million (US rentals) or $1.3 million

Kiss Them for Me is a 1957 American romantic comedy film directed by Stanley Donen in CinemaScope, starring Cary Grant, Jayne Mansfield and model-turned-actress Suzy Parker in her first film role. The film is an adaptation of the 1945 Broadway play of the same name, itself based on Frederic Wakeman Sr.'s 1944 novel Shore Leave. The supporting cast features Ray Walston, Werner Klemperer, Leif Erickson, and Larry Blyden.

== Plot ==
Three decorated Navy pilots returned from the Pacific to Honolulu. They finagle a four-day leave in San Francisco flying there and back in a friend's PBY Catalina. They land a posh suite at the Fairmont Hotel, where Commander Andy Crewson, a master of procurement, arranges to populate it with wine, women and song.

Blonde bombshell Alice Kratzner is one of these women, lured to the suite under the false pretense that Crewson has a stash of nylon stockings. Once there, she is naturally attracted to Crewson, but later turns her attention to Lieutenant McCann, a married man who also is in the process of running for a Congressional seat back home in Massachusetts. If he is elected, McCann can leave the Navy immediately and return to civilian life.

Lieutenant Wallace tries to get the three pilots, including "Mississip'", to make morale-raising speeches at the plants of shipyard magnate Eddie Turnbill, so that Turnbill will vouch for the men with the Navy and also to grease a lucrative job for himself upon leaving the service. Crewson and his cohorts, however, are physically and mentally exhausted from the war and simply want to enjoy a few days away from it.

Suffering from combat stress and confronted with a number of reminders of the horrors of war, Crewson tries to amuse himself by making a play for Turnbill's attractive fiancée, Gwinneth Livingston. She resists his advances at first, but ultimately throws her engagement ring in Turnbill's face.

The three pilots are called to report back to duty, but McCann wins his election and becomes a congressman whereby he grants his two friends a peaceful posting away from the battlefront. At a celebratory party, the three pilots encounter a drunk crewman who tells them the ship he was supposed to be on was sunk at Pearl Harbor.

Crewson is overcome with guilt and declares his love for Gwinneth shortly before he and his mates cancel their posting and board a plane to return to duty.

== Cast ==
- Cary Grant as Lieutenant Commander Andy Crewson
- Jayne Mansfield as Alice Kratzner
- Leif Erickson as Eddie Turnbill
- Suzy Parker as Gwinneth Livingstone
- Ray Walston as Lieutenant McCann
- Larry Blyden as Mississip
- Nathaniel Frey as Chief Petty Officer Ruddle
- Werner Klemperer as Lieutenant Walter Wallace
- Jack Mullaney as Ens. Lewis
- Kathleen Freeman as Nurse Wilinski
- Harry Carey, Jr. as Lt. Chuck Roundtree
- Maudie Prickett as Chief Nurse
- Richard Deacon as Bill Hotchkiss
- Frank Nelson as Hotel Manager R.L. Nielson

== Production ==
Frederic Wakeman, Sr. (1909–1998) worked in the advertising industry until leaving Lord & Thomas to serve in the United States Navy in the Pacific from 1942 to 1943. Recovering in a naval hospital, he wrote his first novel, Shore Leave, basing the character of Andy Crewson on an actual decorated naval aviator, which was published in 1944.

In 1945 the recently discharged Luther Davis acquired the rights to Wakeman's novel and adapted it into a play called Kiss Them for Me which ran for 110 performances from March 20, 1945, to June 23, 1945, and featured Richard Widmark as Crewson and Judy Holliday as Alice. The success of the novel and play led Wakeman to a seven-year writing contract with Metro-Goldwyn-Mayer where he wrote his second novel The Hucksters that was filmed by MGM with a screenplay by Davis. Producer Jerry Wald acquired the rights to both the novel and play in September 1956.

When Wald acquired the property Richard Widmark was approached to reprise his Crewson role but was quickly passed over once Cary Grant expressed interest in the project. The film was the first of four collaborations between Stanley Donen and Grant.

The screenplay toned down many cynical anti-war profiteer dialogues of the play and made the Alice character a war worker rather than a "Victory Girl". The film was the feature film debut of both Ray Walston and Nathanial Frey, who had appeared together in Damn Yankees on stage, as well as Suzy Parker.

The film was shot on various locations in San Francisco. At the end of the film, USS Boxer, an Essex-class aircraft carrier, can be seen launching a Douglas A-1 Skyraider type aircraft, though the Skyraider type was not actually used in World War II.

== Reception ==
In October 1958 Wald reported the film made a loss of $400,000. It was one of Wald's few financial failures around this time.

== In popular culture ==
The English band Siouxsie and the Banshees used the movie's name in the title and lyrics of their 1991 release "Kiss Them for Me" which became a top twenty hit in the US Billboard Hot 100. The song was an ode to Mansfield, her lifestyle with catchphrases like "It's divoon" or "I may be delayed" and her death while driving from Biloxi to New Orleans in 1967.

== See also ==
- List of American films of 1957
