= Carbondale, Kansas =

City in Osage County, Kansas

- City
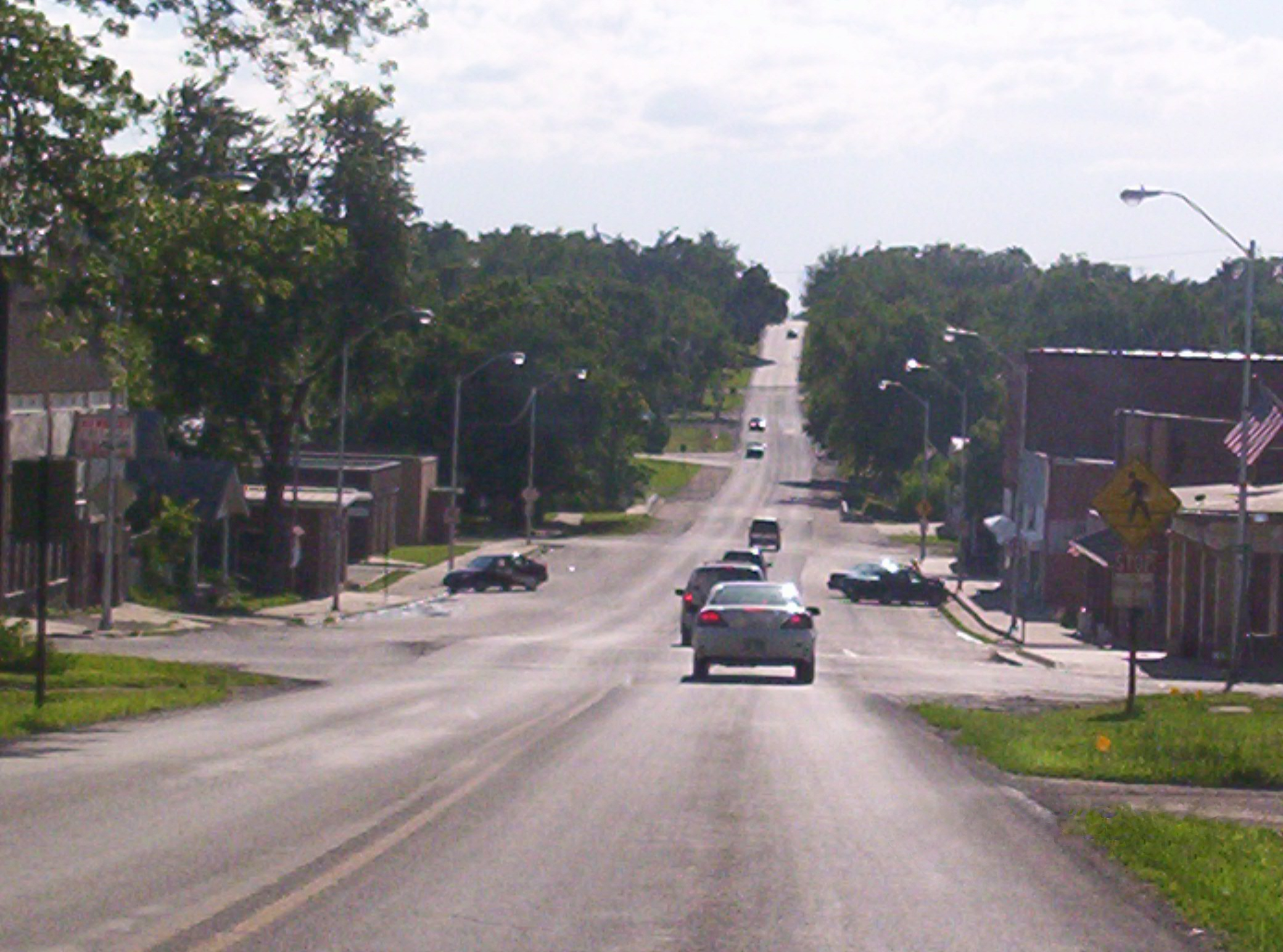
- Downtown Carbondale (2005)

- Location within Osage County and Kansas

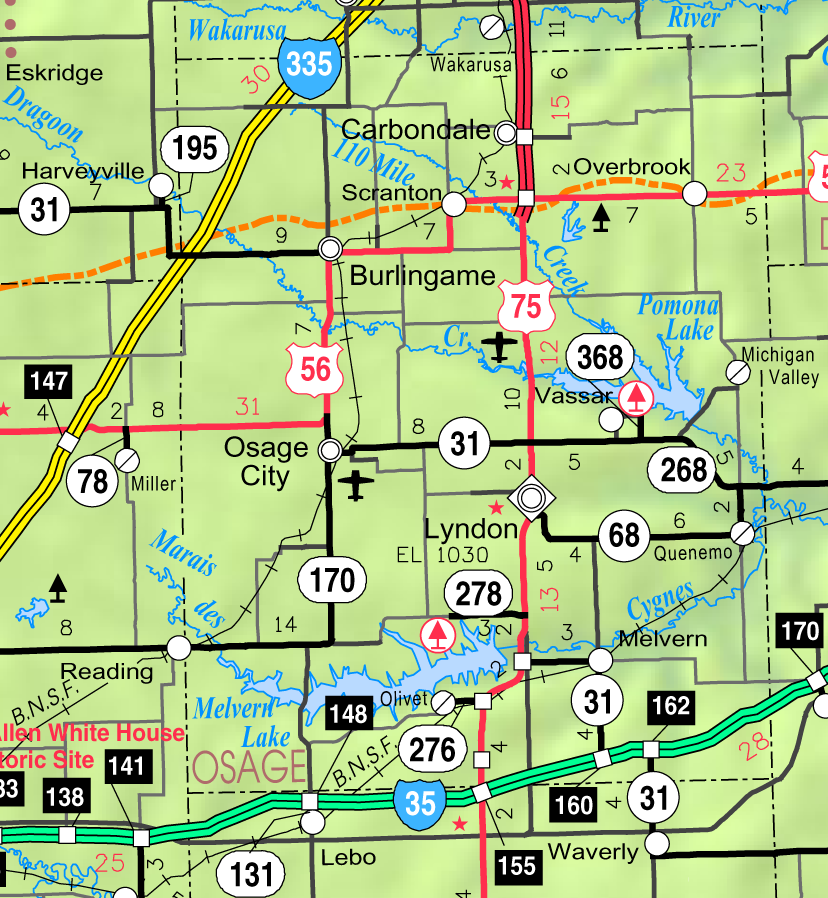
- KDOT map of Osage County (legend)
- Coordinates: 38°49′6″N 95°41′30″W
- Country: United States
- State: Kansas
- County: Osage
- Founded: 1869
- Incorporated: 1872
- Named for: Carbon Coal Company

Area
  - Total: 0.75 sq mi (1.95 km^{2})
  - Land: 0.73 sq mi (1.89 km^{2})
  - Water: 0.023 sq mi (0.06 km^{2})
- Elevation: 1,125 ft (343 m)

Population (2020)
  - Total: 1,352
  - Density: 1,850/sq mi (715/km^{2})
- Time zone: UTC-6 (CST)
  - Summer (DST): UTC-5 (CDT)
- ZIP Code: 66414
- Area code: 785
- FIPS code: 20-10600
- GNIS ID: 479448
- Website: carbondaleks.com

Carbondale is a city in Osage County, Kansas, United States. As of the 2020 census, the population of the city was 1,352. It is located south of Topeka along the U.S. Route 75 four-lane freeway.

== History ==
Carbondale was founded in 1869. It initially grew as a coal town of the Carbon Coal Company. Coal is a carbon-based fuel, hence the name.

From 1906 to 1908, the Daughters of the American Revolution of Kansas placed sixty-six markers along the path of the Santa Fe Trail as it ran through Kansas; number seventeen is located in Carbondale.

== Geography ==
Carbondale is located at 38°49′6″N 95°41′30″W (38.818411, -95.691533). It is the first city south of Topeka on U.S. Highway 75. According to the United States Census Bureau, the city has a total area of 0.77 square miles (1.99 km^{2}), of which 0.75 square miles (1.94 km^{2}) is land and 0.02 square miles (0.05 km^{2}) is water.

== Demographics ==
Historical population
Census	Pop.	Note	%±
1880	710		—
1890	847		19.3%
1900	625		−26.2%
1910	461		−26.2%
1920	383		−16.9%
1930	399		4.2%
1940	415		4.0%
1950	453		9.2%
1960	664		46.6%
1970	1,041		56.8%
1980	1,518		45.8%
1990	1,526		0.5%
2000	1,478		−3.1%
2010	1,437		−2.8%
2020	1,352		−5.9%
U.S. Decennial Census

Carbondale is part of the Topeka, Kansas Metropolitan Statistical Area.

=== 2020 census ===
The 2020 United States census counted 1,352 people, 578 households, and 350 families in Carbondale. The population density was 1,849.5 per square mile (714.1/km^{2}). There were 622 housing units at an average density of 850.9 per square mile (328.5/km^{2}). The racial makeup was 91.64% (1,239) white or European American (89.05% non-Hispanic white), 0.15% (2) black or African-American, 0.15% (2) Native American or Alaska Native, 0.81% (11) Asian, 0.0% (0) Pacific Islander or Native Hawaiian, 0.67% (9) from other races, and 6.58% (89) from two or more races. Hispanic or Latino of any race was 4.36% (59) of the population.

Of the 578 households, 31.7% had children under the age of 18; 40.5% were married couples living together; 34.1% had a female householder with no spouse or partner present. 33.2% of households consisted of individuals and 16.4% had someone living alone who was 65 years of age or older. The average household size was 2.4 and the average family size was 2.7. The percent of those with a bachelor's degree or higher was estimated to be 7.8% of the population.

25.5% of the population was under the age of 18, 7.1% from 18 to 24, 25.7% from 25 to 44, 25.7% from 45 to 64, and 15.9% who were 65 years of age or older. The median age was 37.7 years. For every 100 females, there were 106.7 males. For every 100 females ages 18 and older, there were 112.4 males.

The 2016–2020 5-year American Community Survey estimates show that the median household income was $60,938 (with a margin of error of +/- $8,960) and the median family income was $72,250 (+/- $13,834). Males had a median income of $40,521 (+/- $10,374) versus $24,265 (+/- $4,021) for females. The median income for those above 16 years old was $30,878 (+/- $5,092). Approximately, 9.4% of families and 12.0% of the population were below the poverty line, including 15.7% of those under the age of 18 and 15.8% of those ages 65 or over.

=== 2010 census ===
As of the census of 2010, there were 1,437 people, 590 households, and 385 families residing in the city. The population density was 1,916.0 inhabitants per square mile (739.8/km^{2}). There were 637 housing units at an average density of 849.3 per square mile (327.9/km^{2}). The racial makeup of the city was 95.8% White, 0.3% African American, 1.2% Native American, 0.2% Asian, 0.1% Pacific Islander, 0.3% from other races, and 2.1% from two or more races. Hispanic or Latino of any race were 2.9% of the population.

There were 590 households, of which 34.6% had children under the age of 18 living with them, 45.1% were married couples living together, 14.1% had a female householder with no husband present, 6.1% had a male householder with no wife present, and 34.7% were non-families. 29.7% of all households were made up of individuals, and 11.8% had someone living alone who was 65 years of age or older. The average household size was 2.44 and the average family size was 3.00.

The median age in the city was 34.3 years. 26.5% of residents were under the age of 18; 10.7% were between the ages of 18 and 24; 23.2% were from 25 to 44; 26.4% were from 45 to 64; and 13.2% were 65 years of age or older. The gender makeup of the city was 50.0% male and 50.0% female.

=== 2000 census ===
As of the census of 2000, there were 1,478 people, 581 households, and 393 families residing in the city. The population density was 2,020.0 inhabitants per square mile (779.9/km^{2}). There were 617 housing units at an average density of 843.3 per square mile (325.6/km^{2}). The racial makeup of the city was 96.75% White, 0.27% African American, 0.54% Native American, 0.07% Asian, 0.07% Pacific Islander, 0.54% from other races, and 1.76% from two or more races. Hispanic or Latino of any race were 3.79% of the population.

There were 581 households, out of which 41.1% had children under the age of 18 living with them, 50.1% were married couples living together, 13.8% had a female householder with no husband present, and 32.2% were non-families. 28.2% of all households were made up of individuals, and 11.5% had someone living alone who was 65 years of age or older. The average household size was 2.54 and the average family size was 3.16.

In the city, the population was spread out, with 32.0% under the age of 18, 9.3% from 18 to 24, 29.5% from 25 to 44, 19.4% from 45 to 64, and 9.8% who were 65 years of age or older. The median age was 33 years. For every 100 females, there were 89.7 males. For every 100 females age 18 and over, there were 82.7 males.

The median income for a household in the city was $31,550, and the median income for a family was $39,226. Males had a median income of $29,226 versus $21,300 for females. The per capita income for the city was $14,729. About 9.8% of families and 11.1% of the population were below the poverty line, including 13.4% of those under age 18 and 11.5% of those age 65 or over.

== Government ==
The Carbondale City Library is located inside the City building in Carbondale, Kansas. The library opened in 1971 and is a member of the Northeast Kansas Library System, NEKLS. The library has a wide selection of children's and adult books. They have an extensive collection of large print books. The library also boasts a selection of audiobooks on tape and compact disc. The library has patron computers with a wide variety of programs and free use of the internet. The library also has a Friends of the Library organization which meets monthly.

== Education ==
Carbondale is served by USD 434 Santa Fe Trail. USD 434 includes Carbondale, Scranton and Overbrook. The Carbondale attendance center houses grades K-8. The district high school is Santa Fe Trail High School.

The Santa Fe Trail Chargers won the Kansas State High School boys class 4A basketball championship in 1997 and the girls class 4A basketball championship in 1998.

Carbondale High School was closed through school unification. The Carbondale Vikings won the Kansas State High School boys class B basketball championship in 1951.

== Notable people ==
- Daniel Forbes Jr, pioneer U.S. Air Force photoreconnaissance pilot.
- Barnum Brown, American Museum of Natural History paleontologist.
