= Kiss Them for Me (play) =

1945 play by Luther Davis

Kiss Them for Me is a play by Luther Davis. It was staged on Broadway in 1945 and is based on Frederic Wakeman Sr.'s 1944 novel entitled Shore Leave. The play ran for 110 performances. Opening at the Belasco Theatre on March 20, 1945, it closed at the Fulton Theatre on June 23 of the same year.

== Plot ==
The play, set in The St. Mark Hotel and a naval hospital in San Francisco, centers on three navy war heroes who have been sent on a "vacation". The morale-building trip, which is really a public relations effort, is overseen by an officer who tries to get the three to make speeches at shipyard plants, but they just want to find a good time.

== Opening night production credits ==
- Produced by John H. Moses and Mark Hanna
- Script Written by Luther Davis; based on Shore Leave by Frederic Wakeman Sr.
- Directed by Herman Shumlin
- Scenic Design by Frederick Fox

== Opening night cast ==
- Robert Allen ... Turnbill
- George Cory ... Chief
- Jayne Cotter ... Gwynneth
- Edward Crandall ... Lt. Commander Wallace
- Richard Davis ... Mac
- Amy Douglass ... Chief Nurse
- Paul Ford ... Mr. Hardy
- Harold Grau ... Tailor
- Judy Holliday ... Alice
- Douglas Jones ... Ensign
- Virginia Kaye ... Nurse Wilinski
- Dennis King, Jr. ... Mississip
- George Mathews ... Gunner
- John McGovern ... F. Neilson
- Patricia Quinn O'Hara ... Mrs. Hardy
- Daniel Petrie ... Charlie
- Dudley Sadler ... Hedrick
- Sonya Stokowski ... WAC
- Richard Widmark ... Crewson

== Adaptations ==
- Kiss Them for Me, 1957 comedy film starring Cary Grant and Jayne Mansfield, directed by Stanley Donen.
