= Fate (1953 song) =

"Fate" is a popular song from the 1953 musical Kismet and is credited to Robert Wright and George Forrest. Like all the music in that show, the melody was in fact based on music composed by Alexander Borodin, in this case, Borodin's Symphony No.2. It was introduced on Broadway by Alfred Drake. Howard Keel performed the song in the film version.
