= The Hucksters =

1947 film by Jack Conway

- Theatrical release poster
- Directed by: Jack Conway
- Written by: Luther Davis (screenplay); Edward Chodorov; George Wells (adaptation)
- Based on: The Hucksters; 1946 novel by Frederic Wakeman, Sr.
- Produced by: Arthur Hornblow Jr.
- Starring: Clark Gable; Deborah Kerr; Sydney Greenstreet; Adolphe Menjou; Ava Gardner; Keenan Wynn; Edward Arnold
- Cinematography: Harold Rosson
- Edited by: Frank Sullivan
- Music by: Lennie Hayton
- Production company: Metro-Goldwyn-Mayer
- Distributed by: Loew's Inc.
- Release date: July 17, 1947
- Running time: 115 minutes
- Country: United States
- Language: English
- Budget: $2.4 million
- Box office: $4.4 million

The Hucksters is a 1947 American comedy drama film directed by Jack Conway and starring Clark Gable and Deborah Kerr, her debut in an American film. The supporting cast includes Sydney Greenstreet, Adolphe Menjou, Ava Gardner, Keenan Wynn, and Edward Arnold. It was produced by Metro-Goldwyn-Mayer. The movie is based on the novel The Hucksters by Frederic Wakeman Sr., a skewering of the post-World War II radio advertising industry with Gable's character alternating in pursuit of Kerr and Gardner.

== Plot ==
The film revolves around Victor Norman (Clark Gable), a World War II veteran and radio advertising executive. Victor is in search of a job in his field after returning from the war. In an attempt to appear uninterested in finding work, he throws a few dollars out of his hotel window, leaving himself with only $50.

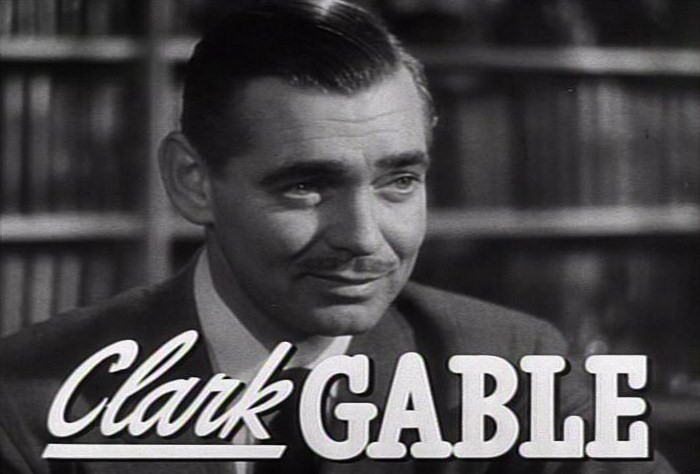
Victor Norman: back from the war and looking for big money on Madison Avenue.

On his way to a job interview at the Kimberly Advertising Agency, Victor spends $35 on a hand-painted necktie to appear sincere. The interview is interrupted by a phone call from Evan Llewellyn Evans (Sydney Greenstreet), the demanding head of the agency's largest client, Beautee Soap. The call causes chaos, and Victor offers to recruit Mrs. Kay Dorrance (Deborah Kerr), a widow of noble British birth and the wife of a WWII U.S. general, for a Beautee Soap campaign targeting Manhattan socialites.

Victor manages to secure an appointment with Kay by pretending to represent the Charity League. During their meeting, he quickly charms her into agreeing to participate in the campaign. However, when they arrive at the photo shoot, the Beautee art director presents a concept featuring a provocative negligee. Victor insists on a more dignified approach and directs a portrait of Kay in an evening gown, surrounded by her children.

The next day, Victor and Mr. Kimberly are summoned to Beautee's offices, where they face Evans. He expresses his displeasure with the changed advertisement but is impressed when Victor plays the radio commercial he created overnight. Evans decides to hire Victor and instructs Kimberly to do so. Victor finds himself attracted to Kay, and they go on a double date with Mr. and Mrs. Kimberly. During the evening, Kimberly drunkenly confesses to starting the agency by betraying his mentor and stealing the Beautee Soap account.

At a nightclub, Victor encounters Jean Ogilvie (Ava Gardner), a torch singer and a former flame, causing tension between him and Kay. To make amends, Victor invites Kay for a romantic getaway in Connecticut. However, when they arrive, they discover the place has changed ownership, and they are assigned adjoining rooms with a connecting door. Upset by the circumstances, Kay leaves, feeling disappointed in Victor.

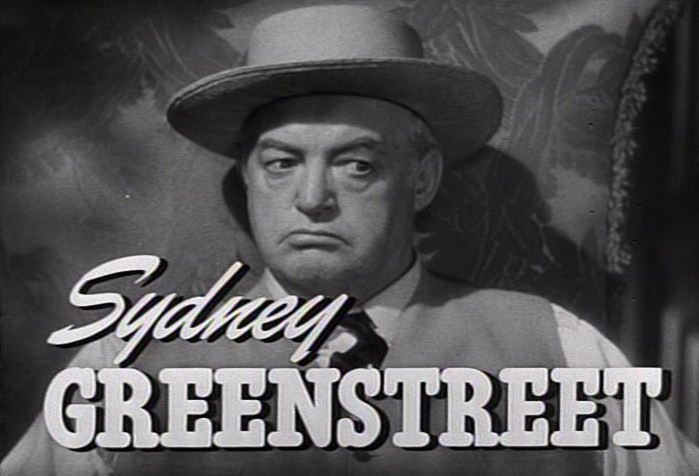
Evan Llewellyn Evans: tyrant head of Beautee Soap, the agency's biggest account.

Evans summons Victor and Kimberly and reveals his desire for a new radio variety show featuring Buddy Hare (Keenan Wynn), a C-list comedian. Victor agrees to secure the deal with Hare's agent, Dave Lash (Edward Arnold), who will be leaving on an evening train. Before heading to the station, Victor visits Kay's house, but their conversation leaves them both unsettled. On the train, he meets Jean again and recruits her help to sign Hare at a lower price. Despite Lash realizing he's been tricked, he honors the deal.

In Hollywood, Victor and his team work on creating the radio show, but they exclude Hare due to his obnoxious behavior and tired jokes. Victor accepts a dinner invitation from Jean but realizes he's still in love with Kay when he returns to find her waiting outside his bungalow. They reconcile, and Victor envisions himself as the provider for Kay and her children.

However, a legal issue threatens the contract with Buddy Hare, and Victor uses cruel innuendo and implied blackmail against Lash to secure the deal. Regretting his actions, Victor feels remorse for his behavior. Back in New York, he presents the proposed show to Evans but realizes that he no longer wants to grovel for success. He confronts Evans, criticizes his behavior, and leaves the meeting.

Outside, Kay waits in her car, and Victor tells her that they will have to postpone marriage until he can regain his financial stability. Kay reassures him that money is not important, as long as he can sell things with dignity and taste. Victor throws his last bit of pocket money into the street, symbolizing their fresh start with nothing, but with a sense of neatness.

== Cast ==
- Clark Gable as Victor Albee Norman
- Deborah Kerr as Kay Dorrance
- Sydney Greenstreet as Evan Llewellyn Evans
- Adolphe Menjou as Mr. Kimberly
- Ava Gardner as Jean Ogilvie
- Keenan Wynn as Buddy Hare
- Edward Arnold as David Lash
- Aubrey Mather as Mr. Glass
- Richard Gaines as Cooke
- Frank Albertson as Max Herman
- Douglas Fowley as Georgie Gaver
- Clinton Sundberg as Michael Michaelson
- Gloria Holden as Mrs. Kimberly
- Connie Gilchrist as Betty
- Kathryn Card as Regina Kennedy
- Lillian Bronson as Miss Hammer
- Vera Marshe as Gloria
- Ralph Bunker as Allison
- Virginia Dale as Kimberly Receptionist
- Jimmy Conlin as Blake
- Gordon Richards as Conrad, Kimberly Butler
- Edwin Cooper as Harry Spooner

== Production ==
Frederic Wakeman's novel The Hucksters (1946) spent 35 weeks in the top stratum of The New York Times Fiction bestseller list, aided perhaps by its raunchy, racy controversy. Life magazine called the book "last year's best-selling travesty" and even Clark Gable, who would eventually star in its film adaptation, said "It's filthy and it isn't entertainment." Life's and Gable's literary sensibilities to the contrary, Metro-Goldwyn-Mayer paid $200,000 for the motion picture rights before the novel was even published.

Screenwriter Luther Davis and the novel's adapters Edward Chodorov and George Wells had "an extensive laundering job" to do to bring the project into compliance with Louis B. Mayer's tastes and the Hays Office's policies. They had to eliminate the graphic (for 1946) sexual scenes, and they changed the book's Mrs. Dorrance from a married woman into a war widow — so she and Vic "could live happily ever after." More problematic, though, was the portrayal of the talent agent David Lash, a pivotal character in the second half of the film. Lash was based on Jules Stein, the founder of talent agency MCA, and Lash's Hucksters protégé Freddie Callahan, who bore an undeniable physical resemblance to Lew Wasserman, Stein's protégé in 1946 who would eventually head MCA himself. Even in 1947, there were "fears about reprisals from MCA" over the portrayals of Stein and Wasserman, and Vic avers on several occasions that "Dave Lash is an honest man" when the dispute arises over the Buddy Hare contract. The other problem was Lash/Stein's ethnicity: in the novel, Vic tells Lash people will call his honesty into question because he is a Jew; Davis removed all references to Lash's ethnicity and made him a kid who had been in trouble but had "gone straight" and succeeded.

Once the toned-down screenplay was finished and Clark Gable's comfort with it secured, producer Arthur Hornblow Jr. made his final casting decisions and "assembled an exceptional supporting cast" featuring Sidney Greenstreet, Adolphe Menjou and Edward Arnold, Keenan Wynn and the then "still-unknown Ava Gardner." MGM executives had selected The Hucksters as the debut Hollywood film for Kerr, who had drawn attention for her appearances in ten films in her native Britain since 1941, causing production to be "rushed by Louis B. Mayer, who wanted to release it the following August, trying to revive Gable's name after the flop of Adventure, his last film and launching Deborah's in Hollywood."

As the start of production neared, Ava Gardner grew nervous about appearing with Gable, an actor she had idolized since childhood. Hornblow asked Gable to call her, and he told her: "I'm supposed to talk you into doing this thing. But I'm not going to. I hated it when they did that to me. But I hope you change your mind, kid, I think it would be fun to work together." The two remained friends for the rest of Gable's life.

Gable also sought to make a nervous Kerr feel relaxed when shooting commenced. He sent her six dozen roses on the first day, and "the two hit it off beautifully from the beginning, on and off the set."

Director Jack Conway, an MGM regular with credits stretching back to the silent era, brought this, his penultimate film, in on Mayer's August 1947 timetable. His budget was $2.3 million.

== Release ==
MGM used a "splash" approach on The Hucksters, opening in 350 theaters on July 17, 1947 before expanding to 1,000 theaters a week later, one of the widest releases of the time.

== Reception ==
=== Critical reception ===
Although Louis B. Mayer had chosen carefully—and spent lavishly—on a property to launch Deborah Kerr and attempt to recoup Clark Gable's popularity after the poorly received Adventure, The Hucksters was not well received by contemporary critics.

Life magazine had excoriated the Wakeman novel, and its film reviewer commented: "The movie version of the famous attack on the advertising business fails to live up to its own ads" and called it "[a] cynically exaggerated study of big business and big advertising."

Bosley Crowther, film critic for The New York Times, wrote that it was simply too much Gable. "[U]nless you like Clark Gable very much, you are going to find him monotonous in this hour-and-fifty-five-minute film... [he] is off the screen for all of five minutes—maybe eight. The rest of the time, he's on." He liked Deborah Kerr rather more: "We could do with a little more of her. Not that her rather radiant passion for this well-tailored roughneck makes much sense, but Miss Kerr is a very soothing person and she elevates the tone of the film." He saved his biggest praise for Greenstreet and Menjou, calling their contributions "entertaining and fascinating."

William Brogdon of Variety was lukewarm: "Somehow Clark Gable just doesn't quite take hold of the huckster part in signal manner. Same goes for Deborah Kerr who is a shade prissy for her volatile romantic role." Like the Times, they were more enthusiastic about the supporting cast: "Sydney Greenstreet's portrayal of the soap despot emerges as the performance of the picture, as does Keenan Wynn as the ham ex-burlesque candy butcher gone radio comic. Ava Gardner is thoroughly believable as the on-the-make songstress; Adolphe Menjou is the harassed head of the radio agency which caters to Evans' whilom ways because it's a $10 million account." Finally, there was an observation, politely put, that no doubt crossed the minds of many 1947 moviegoers: "Gable looks trim and fit but somehow a shade too mature for the capricious role of the huckster who talks his way into a $35,000 job [and] is a killer with the femmes...." Gable's interaction with the two women in the story generated commentary. When it came to the romance between Vic and Kay, Life magazine stuck to its negative guns: "The love story is stupefyingly dull. Opposite the ladylike Deborah, Clark Gable's mannered virility seems embarrassing—something that never happened to him alongside such tough Tessies as Joan Crawford and Jean Harlow in his greater days." But others applauded Kerr and the pairing: The Hollywood Reporter called Kerr "a charming English star... a delightful personality in her American debut." The New York Herald-Tribune called the Gable-Kerr pairing "ideal", saying "she made an impressive bow on the U.S. screen."

Ava Gardner biographer Lee Server, pointing to the chemistry between Vic and his old flame Jean Ogilvie (Gable and Gardner): "proved to be a wonderful pairing, with an on-screen spark between them that revealed their genuine amusement and easy pleasure in each other's company."

Judgment about The Hucksters has mellowed over the years. Halliwell's Film Guide calls it "good topical entertainment which still entertains and gives a good impression of its period", also praising the performance of Greenstreet. The current New York Times capsule summary calls it "one of Clark Gable's best postwar films, as well as one of the finest Hollywood satires of the rarefied world of advertising."

On Rotten Tomatoes the film has a 60% rating based on reviews from 5 critics.

=== Box office ===
The Hucksters opened at number one at the US box office, with a non-holiday record in New York City. It finished twelfth at the box office for 1947, earning $3,635,000 in the US and Canada and $810,000 elsewhere, resulting in a profit of $412,000. Topping that list was another soldiers-come-home tale, The Best Years of Our Lives. Author Denise Mann suggests that Vic Norman's unsavory side might have held The Hucksters back: "Clark Gable's unheroic ad-man as post-war returning hero may have contributed to the smaller returns." It also "was a total failure in the foreign market, which in those days knew nothing about American advertising or commercial broadcasting."

== Home media ==
The Hucksters was released on VHS. Its first DVD release was in August 2011 as part of the Warner Archive Collection.
