= Mary Costa =

American actress and singer (born 1930)

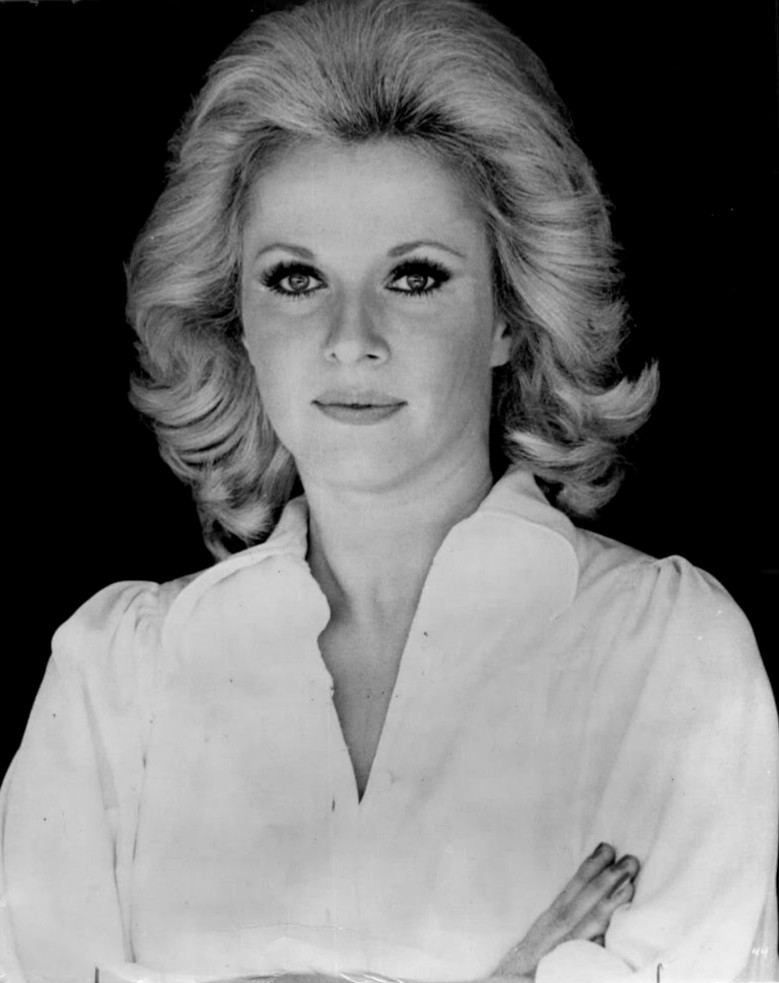
- Costa in 1976
- Born: Mary Demyrtha Costa; April 5, 1930 (age 96); Knoxville, Tennessee, U.S.
- Occupations: Actress; singer
- Years active: 1942–2014 (acting)
- Notable work: Voice of Aurora in Disney's Sleeping Beauty (1959)
- Spouse(s): Frank Tashlin (m. 1953; div. 1966) Anthony Goodwin Chase (m. 1981; died 1985)
- Awards: Disney Legend (1999); National Medal of Arts (2021)

Mary Costa (born April 5, 1930) is an American actress and soprano. A native of Knoxville, Tennessee, she moved to Glendale, California in 1946 to pursue vocal training at the Los Angeles Conservatory of Music while still a high school student. After performing in radio and television programs connected to Edgar Bergen, she was cast as Princess Aurora in the Disney animated film Sleeping Beauty in 1952; a work she spent the next three years recording. The film was not released until 1959, but became the work for which Costa is best known. She also starred in the films Marry Me Again (1953), The Big Caper (1957), and The Great Waltz (1972).

Beginning in 1955 Costa became the co-host of two television programs with William Lundigan, Climax! and Shower of Stars, in which she was featured as the spokeswoman for Chrysler automobile commercials. She continued to co-host these programs through the Spring of 1958; leaving when her career as an opera and concert soprano began to gain traction. She made her professional opera debut as Micaëla in Glynn Ross' staging of Georges Bizet's Carmen at the Redlands Bowl in 1957. This was followed by her first appearance with a major opera organization in 1958 when she appeared in the title role of Il segreto di Susanna at the Glyndebourne Festival.

Costa had an international career as an operatic soprano; performing with major theaters like the Metropolitan Opera, the Royal Opera House in London, the Paris Opera, and the San Francisco Opera among other organizations. While she appeared in more than 40 opera roles during her career, she was particularly known for the part of Violetta in Giuseppe Verdi's La traviata which was her most frequently performed character. She also appeared in concerts with the New York Philharmonic, the Los Angeles Philharmonic, the Chicago Symphony Orchestra, the Philadelphia Orchestra, and the London Symphony Orchestra among other symphonies.

After her second marriage in 1981, Costa ceased performing for the next three years. She resumed performing in the 1984-1985 season with vocal problems reported in reviews during that period. She retired from performance after an unsuccessful appearance at the Arizona Opera in 1985 in which she was let go mid-production. She is the last surviving voice actress of the three Disney Princesses created in Walt Disney's lifetime and was named a Disney Legend in 1999. In November 2007 she was inducted into the Knoxville Opera Hall of Fame. She is a recipient of the 2020 National Medal of Arts.

== Biography ==
=== Early life in Knoxville ===
The daughter of John Thomas Costa and Hazel Costa (née Ogg), Mary Demyrtha Costa was born in Knoxville, Tennessee on April 5, 1930. Her middle name, Demyrtha, was invented by her mother by combining the names of Mary's four aunts (her mother's sisters): Diane, Edna, Myrtle, and Bertha. In her growing up years she lived with her parents in Knoxville at a home at 3018 East Fifth Avenue.

Mary's paternal grandfather was born in Italy, and her paternal grandmother was born in Ireland. Her father was a Methodist who was born and raised in Tallahassee, Florida. He initially worked as an expert draftsman for the Florida state land office. He was later the Southern division manager for the Helme Tobacco Company for 25 years. Mary's mother, Hazel, was born in Knox County in 1892 to American parents of Scottish and Irish ancestry. She grew up in the Fountain City neighborhood of Knoxville. Hazel was Baptist and a member of Knoxville's First Baptist Church (FBC).

Mary's parents married in 1922. She had her earliest singing experiences at FBC, and attended Park City Lowry School for her primary school education where she participated in school plays. She began piano studies at the age of eight with Mrs. Hans Schroeder. She continued her education at McCampbell School when she entered the sixth grade. There she played piano to accompany school theatrics.

From 7th through 9th grade Mary attended Christenberry Junior High School (CJHS) where she was active in the school music and drama programs. During World War II, she was a member of the Girl Reserves of the Y.W.C.A. and was involved in selling war bonds as a volunteer with this group. The Girl Reserves was one of the school clubs at Christenberry. She sang Gounod's "Ave Maria" at a 1942 Christmas event at CJHS sponsored by the Girl Reserves. She was also featured as a soloist in school choir concerts at CJHS, and was a member of the Christenberry Glee Club led by music teacher Mary E. Stevenson.

Costa studied singing privately in Knoxville with Mrs. Bruce Hamilton, and was a piano student of Mrs. Dale Waufford Ogg. By 1945 she was singing as a soloist at local public events such as weddings; sometimes with her mother as her accompanist. That year she entered the 10th grade at Knoxville High School where she was a member of the glee club under the direction of Edward H. Hamilton. She also sang under Hamilton's music direction as a member of the choir at FBC.

=== Education in California ===
In 1946 the Costa family relocated to Glendale, California. They made the move so that Mary could receive better musical training. She became a student at Glendale High School (GHS) in her junior year. In March 1947 she portrayed the leading soprano role in GHS's production of Gustav Luders's operetta The Prince of Pilsen. During her senior year at GHS, her father died on December 13, 1947 at the age of 71. She won a Music Sorority Award as the outstanding voice among Southern California high school seniors.

While attending GHS, Costa concurrently studied at the Los Angeles Conservatory of Music (now the California Institute of the Arts) from which she graduated. After high school she majored in music at Los Angeles City College. Her teachers in Los Angeles included opera conductor Adolf Heller, composer Gastone Usigli, voice teacher Beatrice Borbridge, and language teacher Egeria Amato (wife of Pasquale Amato). She also studied opera repertoire in L.A. with vocal coaches Mario Chamlee and Ernest St. John Metz.

=== Early career, first marriage, and Sleeping Beauty ===
Between 1948 and 1951, Costa made several guest appearances with Edgar Bergen and Charlie McCarthy on The Chase and Sanborn Hour. She also sang with Dean Martin and Jerry Lewis in concerts at UCLA, and made numerous commercials for Lux Radio Theatre. While singing with the choir at First Baptist Church of Glendale (FBCG), she was scouted by Hollywood talent agent Ben Medford in 1952. Medford took her to audition for film director Frank Tashlin who was impressed by Costa's talent

Tahslin arranged for Costa to meet film and television composer Walter Schumann at a party. Impressed with her singing at this party, Schumann brought Costa to the attention of Walt Disney who he knew was in the process of casting Sleeping Beauty. She successfully auditioned for the film at Walt Disney Studios and was cast in the role of Princess Aurora. Walt called her personally within hours of the audition to inform her that the part was hers. Not long after Tashlin proposed marriage to Costa, and their engagement was announced in October 1952. They married at FBCG on June 30, 1953. Their marriage ended in divorce in 1966.

Costa spent three years (1952-1955) recording the music and speaking parts for Sleeping Beauty which was not released until years later in 1959. The movie was a hit. While she had other successes in her career, this film is the work for which she is best known. She made her film debut earlier as Joan in Marry Me Again (1953); a RKO film directed by Tashlin. She also starred in a television pilot for the sitcom Oops, It's Daisy which co-starred Helen Halpin and was produced by Tashlin. The pilot aired on August 19, 1953 on KNBH. She starred opposite Willard Waterman in the original pilot for The Great Gildersleeve which was broadcast in December 1954; although other contractual obligations prevented her from remaining with the program when it was picked up for series the following year.

Beginning in 1955 Costa served as the regular co-host of two television series with William Lundigan: Climax! and Shower of Stars; both of which featured Costa voicing Chrysler automobile commercials. She was occasionally featured as a singer on these shows; including duets with Jack Benny and Oreste Kirkop in early 1956. She continued to host these programs until the end of the Spring 1958 television season; leaving as her singing career began to take off. She also starred opposite Rory Calhoun in the 1957 film noir crime drama The Big Caper which was released by United Artists.

In July 1955 Costa performed with the Los Angeles Philharmonic at the Hollywood Bowl in a tribute concert to Walt Disney. In September 1956 she appeared at the Starlight Bowl as the featured guest soloist with the Burbank Symphony Orchestra led by Leo Damiani. In 1957 she performed in operas in Los Angeles with the amateur Euterpe Opera Reading Club; portraying the title role in Norma, and Desdemona in Otello. On August 24, 1957 she sang a concert of excerpts from Viennese operettas with the Hollywood Bowl Pops Orchestra and conductor Carmen Dragon at the Hollywood Bowl. Soon after she was featured as a guest on The Jack Benny Show. She later returned to the Hollywood Bowl in 1958 to sing for the Easter Sunrise Service, and to substitute for Elisabeth Schwarzkopf at a gala concert led by Dragon.

=== Singing career ===
==== Early work ====
Costa's first appearance in a professionally staged opera was at the Redlands Bowl on August 30, 1957 in the part of Micaëla in Georges Bizet's Carmen with San Francisco Opera singers Margo Blum (as Carmen) and Chris Lachona (as Don Jose). It was staged and produced by opera impresario Glynn Ross. In December 1957 she won third prize in the regional division of the Metropolitan Opera National Council Auditions with Grace Bumbry taking first place.

In February 1958 she portrayed Marie in The Bartered Bride with the Guild Opera Company in Los Angeles at the Shrine Auditorium. This production was directed by Carl Ebert who was then leading the Glyndebourne Festival (GF). Her work with him in L.A. led to a contract with the GF. She had a great success in her European debut at the GF in summer of 1958 in the title role of Il segreto di Susanna.

Immediately following her GF appearance, Costa went to New York to rehearse the role of Cunegonde in Candide with the operetta's composer, Leonard Bernstein, for an upcoming national tour of the show presented in concert format. The tour opened at the Bucks County Playhouse in New Hope, Pennsylvania in September 1958 with Robert Rounseville and Irra Petina repeating their parts from the original Broadway cast. Costa toured in this production to 60 American cities in late 1958. She subsequently portrayed Cunegonde in a staged version of the operetta for its first European production which toured in the British provinces before playing at the Saville Theatre in London in 1959.

In the summer of 1959 Costa appeared at the Queen Elizabeth Theatre in Vancouver as Euridice in Gluck's Orfeo ed Euridice as part of the Vancouver International Festival with Øivin Fjeldstad conducting and Kerstin Meyer as Orfeo. She gave her first performance with the San Francisco Opera (SFO) on September 4, 1959 on tour with the company at the Paramount Theatre in Portland, Oregon; portraying Musetta in La Bohème with Licia Albanese as Mimi. This was followed the next day by performances of Orff's Carmina Burana in which she was the soprano soloist. She subsequently appeared in both of these production at San Francisco's War Memorial Opera House, and toured in La Bohème with SFO to Los Angeles. Other opera roles she performed with SFO in 1959 included Euridice (with Blanche Thebom as Orfeo), Micaëla (with Gloria Lane as Carmen), and the Guardian of the Temple Gates in Richard Strauss's Die Frau ohne Schatten.

==== Opera performances ====
Costa returned often to San Francisco for opera performances during the 1960s. On September 18, 1961 she created the role of Ninette in the world premiere of Norman Dello Joio's Blood Moon with the SFO. The following October 10 she portrayed Tytania in the SFO's production of Britten's A Midsummer Night's Dream for that opera's United States premiere.

Other roles Costa sang with SFO included Micaëla (1960 & 1964), Musetta (1960, with Anna Moffo as Mimi; 1962), Despina in Così fan tutte (1960), Violetta in La traviata (1960 & 1963), Gilda in Rigoletto (1961, with Cornell MacNeil in the title role), Marguérite in Faust (1962), Anne Trulove in The Rake's Progress (1962), Margherita in Mefistofele (1963, with Giorgio Tozzi in the title role), Alice Ford in Falstaff (1963 & 1970), Marie in The Bartered Bride (1964), Nedda in Pagliacci (1964, with James McCracken as Canio), Rosalinda in Die Fledermaus (1965), Zerlina in Fra Diavolo (1968), and Rosina in The Barber of Seville (1969).

Costa was also active with the Cincinnati Opera (CO) during the 1960s and early 1970s. She sang Verdi's Violetta to Barry Morell's Alfredo for her first performance with Cincinnati Opera (CO) in the summer of 1960. She subsequently returned to Cincinnati in the title role of Jules Massenet's Manon (1961); as Violetta (1964, with Sherrill Milnes as Germont); as Mimi in La bohème (1966); as Gilda in Rigoletto (1969), as Adina in The Elixir of Love (1969), Desdemona in Verdi's Otello (1970), and the title role in La Périchole (1974).

Costa made her Metropolitan Opera ("the Met") debut as Violetta in La traviata on January 6, 1964. She returned to the Met as Massenet's Manon (1964-1965, with Nicolai Gedda as Des Grieux); in the title role of Samuel Barber's Vanessa (1965); Marguerite in Faust (1965, with Justino Diaz), as Alice Ford to Geraint Evans' Falstaff (1965); Rosalinde in Die Fledermaus (1967, with Roberta Peters as Adele); and in a reprisal as Violetta (1973, with Leo Goeke as Alfredo). In 1975 she toured with the Met to Japan as Musetta in La Bohème with Luciano Pavarotti as Rodolfo, Adriana Maliponte as Mimì, and John Reardon as Marcello. Her final appearance at the Met was on November 18, 1977 as Musetta with Renata Scotto as Mimì. She also sang the role of Musetta for a complete recording of La Bohème released by RCA Victor in 1962 with Anna Moffo, Richard Tucker, and the Rome Opera House Orchestra and Chorus conducted by Erich Leinsdorf.

Costa sang Violetta for her debuts with The Royal Opera, London (1962), the Philadelphia Grand Opera Company (1962), the Seattle Opera (1963), the San Antonio Grand Opera Festival (1963), Moscow's Bolshoi Theatre (1970), the New Orleans Opera (1971), the Dayton Opera(1972), and Knoxville Opera (1978). She was also seen at The Royal Opera in 1962 as Concepción in L'heure espagnole. She later returned to Philadelphia as Rosina in The Barber of Seville (1970). In 1963 she gave her first performance with the Pittsburgh Opera as Gounod's Marguérite to Barry Morell's Faust; a role she later repeated with the company in 1965 with Norman Treigle as Mephistopheles and Alan Wagner in his opera debut as Wagner. She also performed in Pittsburgh as Violetta (1965) and Rosina (1969).

In April 1964 Costa appeared at Carnegie Hall with the American Opera Society as Giulietta in Bellini's I Capuleti e i Montecchi with Giulietta Simionato as Romeo. She returned to Seattle Opera as Adina in The Elixir of Love (1969), Massenet's Manon (1975), and Verdi's Desdemona with Louis Roney as Otello (1977). In 1973 she portrayed Marenka in The Bartered Bride with the Opera Company of Boston under conductor Sarah Caldwell. That same year she portrayed Hanna Glawari in The Merry Widow with the Opera Theater of New Jersey. She also appeared as a guest artist at the Paris Opera, and performed in operas in Portugal.

==== Concert performances ====
On the concert stage, Costa was a featured soloist in several concerts with the Los Angeles Philharmonic at the Hollywood Bowl during the 1960s and 1970s. She gave her first performance with the Chicago Symphony Orchestra (CSO) at the 1960 Ravinia Festival. She later sang a concert of opera excerpts with the CSO in 1970 under the baton of Henry Mazer. She gave a joint recital with Jan Peerce at the Academy of Music in Philadelphia in 1961 and 1966. She performed Strauss' Four Last Songs with the Cincinnati Symphony Orchestra in 1964. In 1966 she sang the aria "Song to the Moon" from Rusalka with the Philadelphia Orchestra and conductor Eugene Ormandy in a concert which was filmed for television broadcast. She later sang a concert of opera arias with this orchestra at the Trenton War Memorial in 1969.

In 1968 Costa sang excerpts from The Ballad of Baby Doe, Candide, and The Telephone with the New York Philharmonic (NYP) at Philharmonic Hall. She later sang with the orchestra again for its concert of Viennese music led by conductor Andre Kostelanetz in 1973. Other orchestras she performed with during her career included the Pittsburgh Symphony Orchestra (1960 & 1975), the San Antonio Symphony (1961), the Knoxville Symphony Orchestra (1962, 1965, & 1975), the Tulsa Philharmonic (1962), the Nashville Symphony (1965), the Fort Worth Symphony (1965), the Louisville Orchestra (1966), the Detroit Symphony Orchestra (1966 & 1971), the Dayton Philharmonic Orchestra (1968) the Shreveport Symphony Orchestra (1973), the Wheeling Symphony Orchestra (1978), and the New Jersey Symphony (1978).

In 1963 Jacqueline Kennedy asked Costa to sing at a memorial service for her husband, U.S. President John F. Kennedy, from the Los Angeles Sports Arena. At the memorial concert, she sang the "Libera Me" from Giuseppe Verdi's Requiem under the baton of conductor Zubin Mehta. In collaboration with the United States Department of State, Costa gave concert tours of Russia in 1965 and 1970. In 1969 she appeared at the Chicago Auditorium; recreating a program sung by Adelina Patti for the inauguration of that theatre. In 1971 she sang for the inaugural concert of the John F. Kennedy Center for the Performing Arts. On April 10, 1973 Costa sang at the White House for the state dinner given by American president Richard Nixon for Singapore's prime minister Lee Kuan Yew. In October 1977 she returned to Carnegie Hall to sing in the Richard Tucker Memorial Gala.

=== Other television and film work ===
Costa impressed television audiences throughout her career with guest appearances on many shows. In 1960 she appeared with Frank Sinatra in the television special The Frank Sinatra Timex Show: Here's to the Ladies. She sang with Richard Tucker on The Voice of Firestone in 1963. In 1968 she appeared in the television special Girl Friends and Nabors with Jim Nabors, Carol Burnett, Vikki Carr, and Debbie Reynolds. In 1971 she was a guest star in the television special Bing Crosby and the Sounds of Christmas in which she appeared with both Crosby and Robert Goulet. In 1973, Sammy Davis Jr. asked her to appear on his first NBC Follies, in which she performed a blues selection with Davis. Costa also appeared in a television special headlined by Milton Berle (1966).

In 1963 Costa appeared with Harry Secombe on British television on the program Sunday Night at the London Palladium. In 1964 she sang with the London Symphony Orchestra (LSO) under Charles Mackerras on the BBC Television program Gala Performance, and that same year appeared as Violetta in a televised version of La traviata made by the BBC with conductor Bryan Balkwill leading the LSO and the chorus of the Glyndebourne Festival. She later filmed the role of Marguerite in Faust for BBC Television in a production that was broadcast in 1967. It was produced by Basil Coleman and co-starred Michael Langdon as Méphistophélès and Stuart Burrows as Faust. She also filmed The Merry Widow for BBC TV in 1968 with Jeremy Brett as Count Danilo.

Some of the other television programs Costa appeared on as a guest included The Dinah Shore Chevy Show (1959), The Hollywood Palace (multiple appearances in 1960s/70s), Highways of Melody (1962), The Ed Sullivan Show (1963), The Joey Bishop Show (1969), The Jim Nabors Hour (1970), The Merv Griffin Show (1970), and The Don Knotts Show (1971). In 1972, she starred in the Metro-Goldwyn-Mayer feature The Great Waltz, depicting the life of Johann Strauss II.

=== Later years ===
In 1981 Costa married her second husband, lawyer Anthony Goodwin Chase. He died in 1985 at the age of 47. She stopped singing at the time of her 1981 marriage, and did not make any singing engagement for the next three years. She came back to the concert stage in Baltimore in 1984 to sing a concert with the orchestra of the Washington National Opera. In September 1984 she sang a concert with the Mansfield Symphony Orchestra in Ohio that was poorly reviewed. Some sources state that Costa retired from performance in 1984. However, her last appearance occurred in March 1985 with the Arizona Opera (AO) where she sang the title role in The Merry Widow one last time. Unhappy with the quality of her singing in the opening night of the show, she was fired mid-production by the AO's director, Glynn Ross, and replaced by her understudy Kathleen Knight.

In May 1989 Costa sued the Walt Disney Company for royalties of $2 million owed to her since the 1986 home-video release of Sleeping Beauty. She was one of three actresses to file lawsuits over royalties for their performances in this timeframe; the others including Peggy Lee of Lady and the Tramp (1955) and Ilene Woods of Cinderella (1950). Costa said that her contract with the studio prevented it from producing "phonograph recordings or transcriptions for sale to the public" without her permission. The case was settled out of court by June 1991, with Costa receiving an undisclosed sum.

In 1993 Costa's mother died at the age of 100 in Palm Beach, Florida. Following her mother's death she moved back to Knoxville which has remained her home. She has dedicated her later years to inspiring children and teenagers, giving motivational talks at schools and colleges across the country. She is also a celebrity endorser for child abuse prevention. She continues to do promotional appearances for Disney, most recently for the Blu-ray release of Sleeping Beauty and the 50th anniversary of the film. She stated that Maleficent (2014) starring Angelina Jolie was "a very good movie". She added that "the concept and perspective are totally different than the original film's, which makes it new and interesting." As for Jolie's performance, she said, "No one could have played the part of Maleficent better," concluding that "she was absolutely magnificent!"

On April 24, 2012, Costa served as the commencement speaker at Pellissippi State graduation ceremony. In 2016, on her 86th birthday, she wrote an open letter to her fans thanking them for their support. She also announced that she would no longer directly reply to fan-mail, but she would continue to sign autographs and meet fans at events while also focusing her efforts on working with young children. In August 2020 during the COVID-19 pandemic, Costa once again thanked fans for their continued support but also announced that she would no longer respond to any fan-mail at all due to the overwhelming amount she received following her 90th birthday.

== Awards and honors ==
Costa was named the Woman of the Year in music by the Los Angeles Times in 1959. In 1989, she received the Lifetime Achievement Award of the Licia Albanese Puccini Foundation. In November 1999, she received the Disney Legends Award, and her handprints are now a permanent part of the Disney Legends Plaza at the entrance to Disney Studios. The Mary Costa Plaza at the General James White Memorial Civic Auditorium and Coliseum is named for her.

In 2000 Costa was selected as the Tennessee Woman of Distinction by the American Lung Association. In 2001 the Metropolitan Opera Guild honored her in its "distinguished Verdi Performances of the 20th Century" list. In 2003 she was appointed by President George W. Bush to the National Council on the Arts, where she served until 2007. In November 2007 she was inducted into the Knoxville Opera Hall of Fame. In December 2007, she was awarded an honorary Doctor of Fine Arts degree by Carson–Newman College in Jefferson City, Tennessee.

On November 10, 2014, she was awarded an Honorary Doctorate of Humane and Musical Letters from the College of Arts and Sciences at the University of Tennessee. On March 17, 2015 she was a recipient of Tennessee's 2015 Governor's Arts Award. She was awarded the National Medal of Arts on January 13, 2021.

== Work ==
=== Partial filmography ===
==== Television ====
Year	Title	Role	Notes
1954	The Great Gildersleeve	Vivian Bennett	Episode: The Water Commissioner
1955-1958	Climax!	Host	
1955-1958	Shower of Stars	Host	
1963	The Ed Sullivan Show	Opera Singer	Season 16, episode: 29
1963	The Voice of Firestone	Marguerite	Episode: Highlights from Gounod's Faust

===== Television shows =====
Year	Title	Role	Notes
1962	34th Academy Awards	Herself	Performer

==== Film ====
Year	Title	Role	Notes
1953	Marry Me Again	Joan	
1957	The Big Caper	Kay	
1959	Sleeping Beauty	Princess Aurora	Voice
1968	The Merry Widow	Anna Glawari	
1972	The Great Waltz	Jetty Treffz	
1999	Titus	Mourner	
2014	Like Sunday, Like Rain	Mrs. Tydings	Uncredited

=== Discography ===
==== Opera recordings ====
Year	Composer	Title	Role	Conductor	Orchestra & Chorus
1961	Giacomo Puccini	La Boheme	Musetta	Erich Leinsdorf	Rome Opera House Orchestra & Chorus
1964	Vincenzo Bellini	I Capuleti e i Montecchi	Giulietta	Lamberto Gardelli	American Opera Society Orchestra & Chorus

== Accolades ==
Year	Award	Category	Result	Nominated work	Ref.
1944	Music Sorority Awards	Outstanding Voice	Won	Best Singer	
1959	Grammy Awards	Best Sound Track Album, Original Cast – Motion Picture or Television	Nominated	Sleeping Beauty	
1973	Golden Globe Awards	New Star of the Year – Actress	Nominated	The Great Waltz	
1999	Disney Legends	Animation—Voice	Won	Sleeping Beauty	
2007	Doctor of Fine Arts degree	Honorary degree from Carson-Newman College in Jefferson City, TN	Won		
2020	National Medal of Arts	Artist	Won	Operatic soprano	
