= The Great Waltz =

The Great Waltz may refer to:

- The Great Waltz (musical), 1934 American Broadway musical about the Strauss family
- The Great Waltz (1938 film), American musical biography of Johann Strauss II
- The Great Waltz (1972 film), American musical biography of Johann Strauss II
