= Arizona Opera Orchestra Musicians Association =

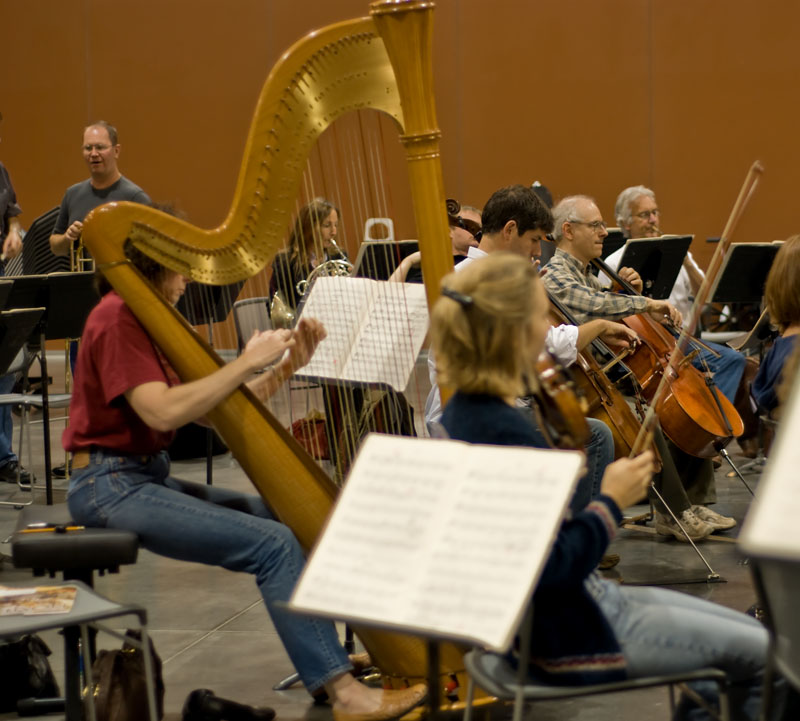
AZOOMA musicians in rehearsal.

Formed in the year 2000 to support its members, the Arizona Opera Orchestra Musicians Association (AZOOMA) is an organization of highly trained and diversified music professionals from the Arizona Opera Orchestra. The majority of orchestra members reside in Phoenix, Tucson and Flagstaff, but some travel from as far as California, New York, California, Kansas, New Mexico, and Vermont to be members of this orchestra.

The Arizona Opera created the Arizona Opera Orchestra to be the dedicated orchestra for the opera company. The orchestra performs in all Arizona Opera productions and concerts that require an orchestra. In Phoenix, Arizona Opera productions typically occur in Phoenix Symphony Hall, the Herberger Theater and in the Arizona Opera Center. In Tucson, productions occur in the Linda Ronstadt Music Hall, Tucson Convention Center and in the Temple of Music and Art.

== Purpose ==
AZOOMA serves as the representative body for the Arizona Opera Orchestra musicians that coordinates with union Local 586 of the American Federation of Musicians. Under the AZOOMA bylaws, the musicians elect audition and grievance committees, a contract negotiation committee, an outreach committee and its representatives with the Regional Orchestra Players Association (ROPA). Beyond this, the organization was created to promote and support Arizona Opera musicians and their activities, and to raise awareness and reach out to the community in support of the Arizona Opera and its programs.

== Members ==
AZOOMA is affiliated with Local 589, American Federation of Musicians and most members have earned bachelors, masters, and doctoral degrees from some of the world's finest conservatories and universities, including, but not limited to:

- Arizona State University
- Boyer College of Music and Dance - Temple University
- Cincinnati Conservatory
- Eastman School of Music
- Indiana University; Jacobs School of Music
- Northern Arizona University
- Northwestern University
- Oberlin Conservatory
- University of Arizona

Other statistics:

- 95% of the orchestra members have a college degree
- 84% of the orchestra members have more than one college degree
- 1/3 of the orchestra members have a doctoral degree

The musicians work under the terms and conditions of a Collective Bargaining Agreement negotiated between the Arizona Opera and American Federation of Musicians, Local 586.
