= Fargo–Moorhead Symphony Orchestra =

Symphony orchestra in Fargo, North Dakota, United States

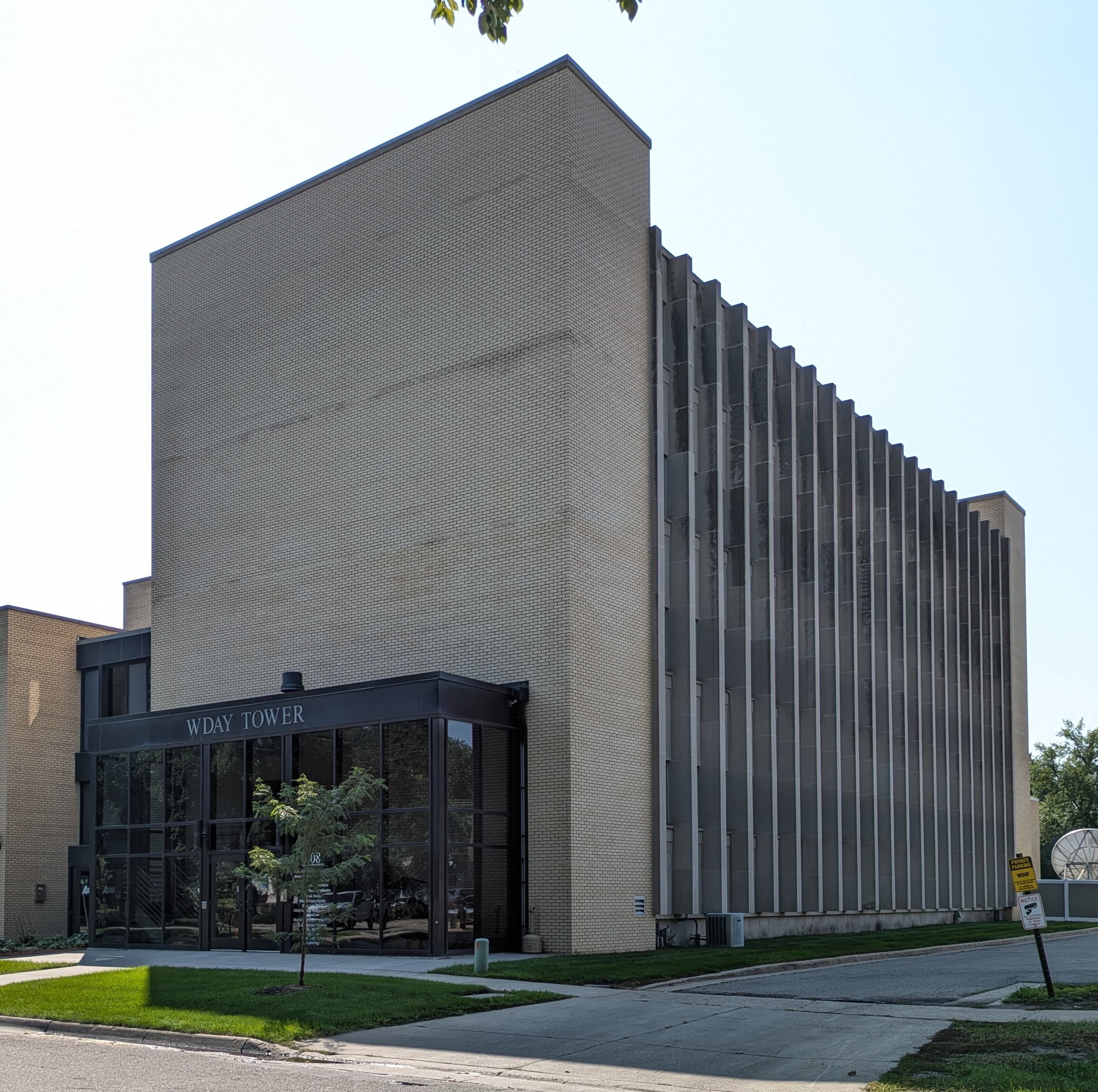
WDAY Tower, location of FMSO's offices

The Fargo–Moorhead Symphony Orchestra (FMSO) is a community orchestra based in Fargo, North Dakota serving the Fargo–Moorhead metropolitan area. The orchestra employs local and regional musicians in performances of classical and modern symphonic music.

What would become the FMSO may be said to have originated in 1912 with a small community orchestra, under the direction of Harry Rudd, showcasing its talents during a Norwegian Saengerfest. That ad hoc ensemble employed forty musicians.

The current organization, however, actually dates its formal charter to 1931 (operating as the "Fargo Civic Orchestra"). Harry Rudd was named the first official conductor of the newly formed orchestra as well, serving in that capacity through 1937. Subsequent music directors have included:

- Sigvald Thompson (1937–1974), also renowned as a composition teacher (to Peter Schickele, among others);
- J. Robert Hanson (1974–1990);
- Joel Revzen (1990–2002); and
- Bernard Rubenstein (2003–2012), who presided over the FMSO's 75th anniversary celebrations during 2006–2007. At its gala concert of March 10, 2007, the orchestra premiered Schickele's three-movement Prairie Skies, a work commissioned for the anniversary.

In June 2013, conductor Christopher Zimmerman was chosen as the orchestra's current music director by the FMSO board of trustees. Maestro Zimmerman is also music director of the Fairfax (Virginia) Symphony Orchestra.

The Fargo–Moorhead Symphony Orchestra currently performs some two-dozen times throughout the year in various capacities, including a Pops Concert series, which has been led by music director Christopher Zimmerman.
