= The Big Caper =

1957 film directed by Robert Stevens

- Directed by: Robert Stevens
- Screenplay by: Martin Berkeley
- Based on: The Big Caper by Lionel White
- Produced by: Howard Pine; William C. Thomas
- Starring: Rory Calhoun; Mary Costa; James Gregory
- Cinematography: Lionel Lindon
- Edited by: George A. Gittens
- Music by: Albert Glasser
- Production company: Pine-Thomas Productions
- Distributed by: United Artists
- Release date: March 28, 1957 (New York City)
- Running time: 85 minutes
- Country: United States
- Language: English

The Big Caper is a 1957 American film noir crime film directed by Robert Stevens and starring Rory Calhoun, Mary Costa and James Gregory.

== Plot ==
His portion of the loot from a recent heist squandered, minor-league criminal Frank Harper talks his boss, Flood, into a more lucrative project: on the weekend before a Monday payday, break into a San Felipe, California bank, which will be holding a million-dollar payroll for the Marine Base at Camp Pendleton. Flood plans the operation, sending his moll Kay with Frank to become established in the community at San Felipe and to lay the groundwork for the heist.

As a means to do this, Frank buys a local gas station and garage, and he and Kay—posing as a married couple—move into a house nearby. In the following month, Flood recruits a team of specialists, including veteran safecracker Dutch Paulmeyer. By now, Kay is enjoying her masquerade role as "homemaker" and tells Frank that she will be breaking off her relationship with Flood. Frank refuses to compromise his friendship with Flood by pursuing Kay, although he is attracted to her. Kay suggests buying a second gas station, going straight and abandoning the criminal life.

Frank eventually agrees to consider a romance with Kay, but only after the heist has been successful. During their stay in the neighborhood, Frank and Kay establish a friendly relationship with the Loxleys'; husband Sam is a banker.

The plan is to set off diversionary explosions at the opposite end of town, which will occupy the police and fire departments—and likely much of the town—on the night of the planned break-in. However, Flood has hired Zimmer, an explosives expert—who is an alcoholic and a psychotic pyrophilia—to engineer the explosions. When Zimmer shows up in San Felipe, he moves in with Frank and Kay.

Kay is called to a meeting with Flood at his apartment where she encounters some of his other associates: Roy, Flood's gopher who is a slightly perverse, self-involved fitness enthusiast; and lookout man Harry, who has brought his slatternly girl friend, Doll, with him. Although Frank warned her against it, Kay tells Flood that she intends to leave after the heist, but insists that she is not involved with anyone else, and that Frank is loyal to him. After Flood and the others show up in San Felipe, Doll demands a cut of the robbery, prompting Flood to order Roy to kill her. Flood then explains to Harry that Doll split after he gave her some money. Flood goes over the final plans for the robbery, in which Zimmer is to create several explosions, including one at the high school as well as one at the electric power plant (thus disabling the bank vault's alarm system).

On the night of the robbery, Frank and Kay attend an evening barbecue at the Loxleys', and hear over the radio about the discovery of a young woman's body. The description makes it clear to both of them that it is Doll who has been murdered. Kay decides she wants to leave immediately and asks Frank to join her, but when Frank learns that the Loxleys' son is at a pageant rehearsal at the targeted high school, which was previously expected to be empty that night, he decides to try and stop Zimmer.

Confronting Zimmer, Frank is knocked unconscious and Zimmer blows up a paint factory, then heads to the high school. Meanwhile, Flood and the others have entered the store next to the bank and are breaking through the wall to the vault. Frank recovers and rushes to the school, discovering the bomb's timer and disabling it. At the bank, Paulmeyer blows open the vault with nitroglycerin.

Later, after Flood returns to Frank's house with cases full of cash, Frank knocks him unconscious and tells Kay to phone the police, intending to return the cash, assuring Kay that, no matter what criminal charges they may face, somehow they will find a way to be together.

== Cast ==
- Rory Calhoun as Frank Harper
- Mary Costa as Kay
- James Gregory as Flood
- Robert H. Harris as Zimmer (credited as Robert Harris)
- Roxanne Arlen as Doll
- Corey Allen as Roy
- Paul Picerni as Harry
- Patrick McVey as Sam Loxley
- Florenz Ames as Dutch Paulmeyer
- Roscoe Ates as Falkenburg

== Production notes ==
The film was based on Lionel White's 1955 novel of the same name. The New York Times described the book as "exciting and convincing".

Film rights were bought by Pine-Thomas Productions who had renamed themselves as Pine-Thomas-Shane following the death of co-founder William Pine. James Poe was originally hired to do the script. Pine-Thomas-Shane announced they would make the film as part of a three-picture deal with United Artists, the other films being Lincoln McEever and The Mountains Have No Shadows. (The last two films ended up not being made, although Pine Thomas made two other films for UA.)

In White's novel, the arsonist Zimmer is named "Kosta," and lookout man Harry is named "Wally." The setting of the novel is the fictional town of "Indio Beach," described as between Palm Beach and Jacksonville on Florida's west coast; whereas the film adaptation places the action in the fictitious California coastal town of "San Felipe," portrayed onscreen as neighboring Oceanside and Camp Pendleton.

The script submitted was originally rejected by the Production Code because it depicted simple arson. This was changed to dynamite.

The top-billed stars were Rory Calhoun, Mary Costa and James Gregory. It was the feature film debut for Costa, who was hostess of the TV show Climax!. Director Robert Stevens was hired from TV. John Payne was originally announced for the male lead. It was to be the last of a five-picture contract he had with Pine Thomas. Martin Berkeley ended up doing the script.

Vic Morrow signed to play the second male lead and filming began in September 1956. A The Hollywood Reporter news item of September 6, 1956 reported that Corey Allen replaced the injured Vic Morrow in the role of "Roy."

Some sources list the character played by Roscoe Ates as "Keeler," in the film he is actually called "Falkenburg," with no character name stated in the credits. According to a Hollywood Reporter news item, The Big Caper marked the first time that Ates, who had appeared in dozens of films, did not use his signature onscreen stammer.

The luxury hotel where Kay meets Flood, Roy, Harry and Doll is actually the Hollywood Riviera condominium complex at 1400 North Hayworth Avenue in West Hollywood, built in 1954 and designed by prolific mid-century architect Edward H. Fickett.
