= The Boy Who Grew Too Fast =

Opera by Gian Carlo Menotti

- Opera for young people by Gian Carlo Menotti
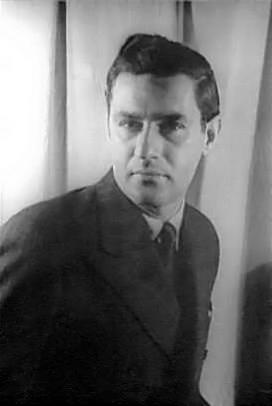
- The composer in 1944
- Librettist: Menotti
- Language: English
- Premiere: September 24, 1982; Grand Opera House (Wilmington, Delaware)

The Boy Who Grew Too Fast is a "one-act opera for young people" with music and libretto by Gian-Carlo Menotti. It was first performed by OperaDelaware at the Grand Opera House in Wilmington, Delaware, on September 24, 1982.

== Roles ==
Role	Voice type	Premiere Cast, (Conductor: )
Conductor	soprano	Evelyn Swensson
Miss Hope	soprano	Denise Coffey
Poponel	tenor	Phillip Peterson
Mrs. Skosvodmonit, Poponel's mother	mezzo-soprano	Sara Hagopian
Dr. Shrinck	tenor	Frank Reynolds
Mad Dog, a terrorist	bass-baritone	Alan Wagner
Nurse Proctor	mezzo-soprano	Joy Vandever
Lizzy Spender	Girl soprano	Miriam Bennett
Police Officer	non-singing	
Children (treble chorus)
