= Joel Revzen =

Joel Revzen (June 27, 1945 – May 25, 2020) was an American opera conductor, arts administrator and pianist. Revzen was a member of the conducting staff of the Metropolitan Opera and held positions with regional opera companies and festivals.

== Early life and education ==
Born in Chicago, Revzen sang in the Chicago Symphony Orchestra Chorus as a teenager. He studied music score reading and conducting with Jean Martinon. He started his formal musical education at the Chicago Musical College of Roosevelt University, completing his Bachelors of Music and Masters of Music degrees in conducting at the Juilliard School of Music. At Juilliard, Revzen won the Frank Damrosch Conducting Prize in 1969.

== Career ==
From 1974 to 1984, Revzen served as Dean of the St. Louis Conservatory of Music. From 1984 to 1989, he was assistant conductor of the St. Paul Chamber Orchestra. From 1990-2002, Revzen was music director of the Fargo-Moorhead Symphony Orchestra and from 1991 to 2003, he was artistic director of the Berkshire Opera Company.

Revzen was an assistant conductor on the conducting staff of the Metropolitan Opera from 1999. He made his Met conducting debut in 2017 conducting Tchaikovsky's Eugene Onegin. He served as assistant conductor on many Met productions.

From 2003 to 2010, Revzen was Artistic Director, General Director and Principal Conductor of the Arizona Opera. He was named its conductor laureate in 2013. During his tenure with Arizona Opera, Revzen conducted 31 opera productions with over 150 performances. The last opera he conducted with the company was Giacomo Puccini's La bohème, in 2014 The Joel and Cindy Revzen Atrium at the Arizona Opera Center in Phoenix Arizona, is named in their honor. From 2012, Revzen was artistic director and principal conductor of the Classical Tahoe festival in Nevada. In 2018 he was appointed music director of the Mayshad Music Festival in Marrakech Morocco.

Revzen guest-conducted many orchestras including, among others, the Prague Symphony, Orchestra Lyon, Seattle Symphony, Minnesota Orchestra, Florida Philharmonic and the Phoenix Symphony Orchestra. Revzen appeared annually with the Marinsky Theatre in St. Petersburg Russia, at the invitation of Valery Gergiev.

Revzen appeared on recordings, including the Grammy winning "The Art of Arleen Auger" where he served as the pianist. Revzen appeared as a conductor on recordings with the St. Paul Chamber Orchestra, the London Symphony, and on a recording of Gian Carlo Menotti's opera, "The Consul," with the Berkshire Opera.

On May 25, 2020, Revzen died of Covid-19 at Memorial Sloan Kettering Cancer Center in Manhattan. His wife Cynthia (Cindy) Rhys and his daughter Shira survive him.
