= Marry Me Again =

1953 film by Frank Tashlin

- Theatrical release poster
- Directed by: Frank Tashlin
- Written by: Frank Tashlin
- Based on: story by Alex Gottlieb
- Produced by: Alex Gottlieb
- Starring: Robert Cummings
- Cinematography: Robert De Grasse
- Edited by: Edward Mann
- Music by: Raoul Kraushaar
- Distributed by: RKO Radio Pictures
- Release date: September 23, 1953
- Running time: 73 minutes
- Country: United States
- Language: English

Marry Me Again is a 1953 American comedy film written and directed by Frank Tashlin. It stars Robert Cummings and Marie Wilson.

== Plot ==
Bill has an unusual dilemma when he returns home from the war in Korea, where he had been a pilot. Out of pride, he wants to provide the sole support for Doris and their family, but Doris isn't sure what to do because she has just inherited a fortune.

== Cast ==
- Robert Cummings as Bill
- Marie Wilson as Doris
- Ray Walker as Mac
- Mary Costa as Joan
- Jess Barker as Jenkins
- Lloyd Corrigan as Mr. Taylor
- June Vincent as Miss Craig
- Richard Gaines as Dr. Pepperdine
- Moroni Olsen as Mr. Courtney
- Frank Cady as Dr. Day

== Production ==
The film was announced in March 1953 based on a story by producer Alex Gottlieb with Windsor and Cummings attached from the beginning. Gottlieb made the film independently for RKO. Filming started June 9, 1953. Cummings had previously appeared in another film for Tashlin.

== Release ==
Marry Me Again premiered at the Oprheum Theatre in Seattle on September 23, 1953 and grossed $5,000 in one week. It was released nationally October 22, 1953.
