= The Great Waltz (1972 film) =

1972 film by Andrew L. Stone

- Directed by: Andrew L. Stone
- Written by: Andrew L. Stone
- Based on: The Great Waltz; 1934 musical by: Johann Strauss I; Johann Strauss II; Desmond Carter; Moss Hart
- Produced by: Andrew L. Stone
- Starring: Horst Buchholz; Mary Costa; Nigel Patrick; Yvonne Mitchell; Rossano Brazzi; Susan Robinson; George Howe; Ken Barrie
- Cinematography: Davis Boulton
- Edited by: Ernest Walter
- Music by: Roland Shaw
- Production company: Metro-Goldwyn-Mayer
- Distributed by: Metro-Goldwyn-Mayer
- Release date: November 1, 1972
- Running time: 135 minutes
- Country: United States
- Language: English

The Great Waltz is a 1972 American biographical musical film directed by Andrew L. Stone, and starring Horst Buchholz, Mary Costa, and Nigel Patrick, that follows 40 years in the life of composer Johann Strauss (the Younger, known as the "Waltz King") and his family. It is based on the musical The Great Waltz, and was Stone's final film. M-G-M released a previous film adaptation in 1938, which is about a different phase of the younger Strauss's life.

The film earned $1,650,000 in North American rentals in 1973.

== Plot ==
In 1840s Vienna, Johann Strauss I (Nigel Patrick) is conducting an orchestra in a ballroom full of dancers, when he is interrupted by his furious estranged wife, who confronts him about the fact that his notorious mistress is planning to name her new baby son by him with the name Johann, the same as Strauss's legitimate son, Johann Strauss II (Horst Buchholz).

After the elder Strauss, as well as the mistress, refuse the wife's demand to change the baby's name, Strauss's wife retaliates by informing the elder Strauss that his son has embarked on a career as a violinist, in direct contradiction to the elder Strauss's wishes, as such a career would consign his son to a life equivalent to a servant.

With the initial help of his mother, and through his talent and cleverness, the younger Strauss is able to find a position in an orchestra. At his debut as a conductor, he is roundly booed by a hostile audience, led by friends of his father. He persists on stage, however, playing one of his own compositions on violin, while leading the orchestra.

His determination wins over the audience with great acclaim. Upon hearing the news of his son's success, the elder Strauss listens in on one of his performances, and hearing his son's words of tribute to him, he is moved to tears, and is won over to his son's career and ambition. Shortly afterwards, the elder Strauss dies of scarlet fever, and the younger Strauss is given the position of leading his father's orchestra.

By the time he reaches age 37, Strauss has achieved enormous success, and along the way has had numerous frivolous affairs with women, all while remaining single, leading his friends and his mother to be concerned for his well-being.

At one of his performances, his catches the eye of Jetty Treffz (Mary Costa), who is the mistress of a baron, and seven years older than him. At a subsequent dinner, he is invited to dine with Jetty and the baron. The two of them dance together to Strauss's orchestra, and begin to fall in love.

Strauss invites Jetty and the baron to a concert, at which Jetty is to sing. The baron, sensing Jetty's interest in Strauss, attempts to scuttle the plans with a sudden business trip, but Jetty insists on delaying her own departure, in order to fulfill her promise to sing. After the concert, Strauss expresses his feelings of love to Jetty, and invites to perform with him for the Emperor. Jetty at first flees from him, but then cancels her plans to join the baron on his trip, and instead joins Strauss at his performance, singing for Franz Joseph, while Strauss accompanies her on the violin.

Despite the warnings of the insistent Baron concerning her age, and Strauss's reputation with women, Jetty leaves the heartbroken Baron and marries Strauss. Strauss's mother is unwelcoming of the idea, but after a visit by the Baron, who seeks to aid Jetty's happiness in her marriage, the mother's heart melts, and she rushes to the church in time to congratulate her son and his new bride.

With Jetty by his side, Strauss achieves the pinnacle of fame, playing in the finest concert halls. He also embarks on the most productive time of his career, composing some of his most well-known pieces, including The Blue Danube, which he presents to a disastrous debut by his insistence on using inferior and sarcastic lyrics, against the tearful protestations of Jetty.

Strauss is then invited to perform at the Paris Exposition of 1867, which he considers an incredible opportunity. Strauss's mother is overjoyed until Jetty confides to her a secret that she has a grown son who lives in Paris, and who will probably blackmail her.

== Cast ==
- Horst Buchholz as Johann Strauss, Jr.
- Mary Costa as Jetty Treffz
- Nigel Patrick as Johann Strauss, Sr.
- Yvonne Mitchell as Anna Strauss
- Rossano Brazzi as Moritz Tedesco
- Susan Robinson as Emilie Trampusch
- George Howe as Karl Frederick Hirsch
- Vicki Woolf as Lili Weyl
- James Faulkner as Josef Strauss
- Paola Loew as Princess Pauline Metternich
- Hermione Farthingale as Louise
- Ken Barrie as Johann Strauss, Jr. (Singing voice, Uncredited)

== See also ==
- List of American films of 1972
