= Alan Wagner (baritone) =

American baritone and voice teacher

Alan Wagner (March 11, 1939 – November 2, 2018) was an American baritone and voice teacher. A native of Longmont, Colorado, he began his career as a member of the United States Army Chorus from 1961 to 1964. He moved to Pittsburgh, Pennsylvania in 1965 where he began his opera career performing with the Pittsburgh Opera and the Pittsburgh Civic Light Opera while a graduate student at Carnegie Mellon University. He joined the music faculty at West Chester University in 1967 where he worked as a voice professor for 37 years. He concurrently had a career as both a concert and opera baritone; working primarily with opera companies in Pennsylvania and in Delaware. He sang leading roles in operas with many well known singers, including Luciano Pavarotti, Samuel Ramey, Mary Costa, and Shirley Verrett among many others.

== Early life and career ==
The son of Katherine and Pete Wagner, George Alan Wagner was born on March 11, 1939 in Longmont, Colorado. He grew up on his parent's dairy farm. He graduated from Northwestern University (NU) in 1961 with a Bachelors of Music degree. On May 12, 1962 he married fellow NU graduate Carol Thomas Butler in South Bend, Indiana. After graduating from NU, he spent three years working as a singer in the United States Army Chorus. In 1963 he portrayed Frank Butler in the American Light Opera Company's production of Annie Get Your Gun which was presented at the Gallaudet Theater in Washington D.C. on the campus of Gallaudet College.

In 1965 Wagner took a position as a church singer on the music staff of Fox Chapel Episcopal Church in Pittsburgh, Pennsylvania, and that same year began graduate studies in music at the Carnegie Institute of Technology (now Carnegie Mellon University). He also performed as an ensemble member with the Pittsburgh Civic Light Opera (PCLO) in the 1965 season. He graduated with a Masters of Music degree from Carnegie Mellon in 1967. In February 1966 he performed the role of Aneas in Chatham College's production of Dido and Aeneas. That same month he made his first appearance in a grand opera with a professional company; appearing with the Pittsburgh Opera (PO) as Wagner in Faust with a cast that included Mary Costa as Marguerite, Norman Treigle as Mephistopheles, and Pierre Duval in the title role.

In the summer of 1966 he returned to the PCLO as Ike Skidmore in Oklahoma!, and in small roles in Guys and Dolls How to Succeed in Business Without Really Trying, and Show Boat. In October 1966 he portrayed Silvio in Pagliacci at Carnegie Music Hall, and appeared with the PO as the Sacristan in Tosca with Dorothy Kirsten in the title role. With the PCLO he performed in the 1967 productions of On a Clear Day You Can See Forever (as Dr. Conrad Fuller), and Bye Bye Birdie (as The Mayor).

== West Chester University and Academy of Vocal Arts ==
While studying at Carnegie Mellon, Wagner was hired on the voice faculty of West Chester University (WCU) in 1967. He taught there as a professor of voice for the next 37 years while maintaining a performance career. During that time he pursued graduate studies in opera performance at the Academy of Vocal Arts (AVA). He graduated with an Artist Diploma from AVA in 1972. He also taught voice privately in Philadelphia. One of his students was Metropolitan Opera bass-baritone Julien Robbins.

In 1971 Wagner portrayed the title role in the United States premiere of Luciano Chailly's Markheim which was presented by the AVA at the Museum of the Philadelphia Civic Center with conductor Anton Guadagno. That same year he won the Emma Feldman Vocal Competition in Philadelphia which earned him a contract for a solo engagement with the Philadelphia Orchestra, and an engagement for a solo recital at the Academy of Music. He performed with accompanist Vladimir Sokoloff in the May 1972 recital that followed from that competition win with The Philadelphia Inquirer critic particularly praising his interpretations of American art songs by Norman Dello Joio and Ned Rorem.

Wagner subsequently performed in the world premiere of Dello Joio's Song of Remembrance at the Saratoga Performing Arts Center with Eugene Ormandy leading the Philadelphia Orchestra in 1977. That same year he performed the role of Michele in AVA's production of Il tabarro. It was one of the last operas led by AVA's longtime director Vernon Hammond in his final year with the school.

== Later performance career ==
=== Late 1960s and 1970s ===
Wagner continued to perform regularly with the Pittsburgh Opera in the late 1960s and early 1970s; appearing in productions of La traviata (1967, as the Doctor), Lakmé (1968, as Frédéric), La bohème (1969, as Schaunard), Pagliacci (1969, as Silvio), Un ballo in maschera (1970, as Silvano), Boris Godunov (1971, with Jerome Hines in the title role), and Faust (1973, as Valentin).

In 1967 Wagner gave his first performance with the Philadelphia Lyric Opera Company (PLOC) as Count Ceprano in Rigoletto at the Academy of Music. He subsequently performed with the PLOC in La bohème (1969, as Schaunard; and 1970, as Marcello), Simon Boccanegra (1972, as Paolo Albiani), La traviata (1973, as Germont), Roméo et Juliette (1974, as Mercutio), and Turandot (1974, as Ping). He sang Schaunard again with the company in 1974 with a young Samuel Ramey as Colline, Nancy Shade as Mimi, and Luciano Pavarotti as Rodolfo.

In 1970 Wagner performed two roles with the Cincinnati Opera: Abimélech in Samson and Delilah (with Shirley Verrett) and Silvio in Pagliacci. That same year he portrayed Ecamillo in Carmen with Philadelphia's Little Lyric Opera Company (LLOC). He subsequently performed with the LLOC as Dr. Malatesta in Don Pasquale (1971, with Harry Dworchak in the title role), Lord Enrico Ashton in Lucia di Lammermoor (1972), Figaro in The Barber of Seville (1973), and Marcello in La bohème (1973). In 1971 he gave a recital at the Philadelphia Museum of Art (PMA), and was the baritone soloist in Samuel Barber's Dover Beach and Ralph Vaughan Williams's Fantasia on Christmas Carols in concerts with the New Hope Pro Musica Orchestra. He returned to the PMA for annual recitals during the 1970s.

Wagner repeated the role of Lord Enrico Ashton with the Wilmington Opera Society (WOS, later called Opera Delaware) in 1973. He returned to the WOS in 1976 as Duncan Heyward in the world premiere of Alva Henderson's The Last of the Mohicans (based on the novel) which was mounted to celebrate the United States Bicentennial. On May 8, 1976 he performed in the world premiere of Elliot Lawrence's The Ballad of Valley Forge with the Pottstown Symphony Orchestra and Chorus at Valley Forge National Historical Park; later repeating the work the following July 4 at the bicentennial concert of the Temple University Music Festival.

In 1974 Wagner performed the role of Dr. Falke in the Philadelphia Grand Opera Company's production of Die Fledermaus at the Robin Hood Dell. In 1977 he gave his first performance with the Opera Company of Philadelphia (OCP) as Masetto in Mozart's Don Giovanni with James Morris in the title role. He subsequently performed in OCP productions of La bohème (1977, as Marcello), Carmen (1978, as Escamillo), and The Tales of Hoffmann (1981).

In January 1979 he sang a concert of musical theatre excerpts with the Philadelphia Orchestra (PO) and conductor William Smith as part of the ensemble's pops concerts series. He sang the part of Adam in Haydn's The Creation with the PO the following month with Ormandy conducting.

=== 1980s and beyond ===
In 1980 he was a soloist in Beethoven's Symphony No. 9 with the Philly Pops orchestra led by Peter Nero. In 1982 he appeared as King Rodomonte in Haydn's Orlando paladino with the Pennsylvania Opera Theater.

On September 24, 1982 Wagner created the role of the terrorist Mad Dog in the world premiere of Gian-Carlo Menotti's The Boy Who Grew Too Fast with Opera Delaware (OD). Some of the other operas he performed in with OD included La bohème (1981, as Marcello), Help, Help, the Globolinks! (1987, as Tony), Charles Strouse's Nightingale (1988, as the Emperor), John McCabe's The Lion, The Witch, and The Wardrobe (1990, as Aslan), Douglas Moore's The Ballad of Baby Doe (1991, as Horace Tabor), and Sigmund Romberg's The Student Prince (1997, as Dr. Engel). His final opera performance was with OD as Cluny the Scourge in the world premiere of Evelyn Swensson's The Legend of Redwall Abbey; an opera based off the Redwall books by Brian Jacques.

In 1985 Wagner sang an all-Russian program with the Delaware Symphony Orchestra, and in 1987 he sang an all-Mozart program with the Pennsylvania Chamber Orchestra. In November 1987 he portrayed Sam in Bernstein's Trouble in Tahiti at the Swarthmore Music and Dance Festival. In 1990 he was a soloist with the Kennett Symphony (KS) at Longwood Gardens in a Shakespeare themed program. He later sang with the KS in a 1995 concert of Broadway show tunes, and in its 1999 holiday concert.

In 1993 Wagner was the bass soloist in Brahm's A German Requiem with the Newark Symphony Orchestra. In 2001 he was the bass soloist in Handel's Messiah at the First Presbyterian Church of Westminster.

== Death ==
Wagner died on November 2, 2018 in West Chester, Pennsylvania. The cause was pancreatic cancer. He had one biological daughter, Catherine, and two adopted children, John and Ninia.
