= Saint Paul Chamber Orchestra =

American chamber orchestra

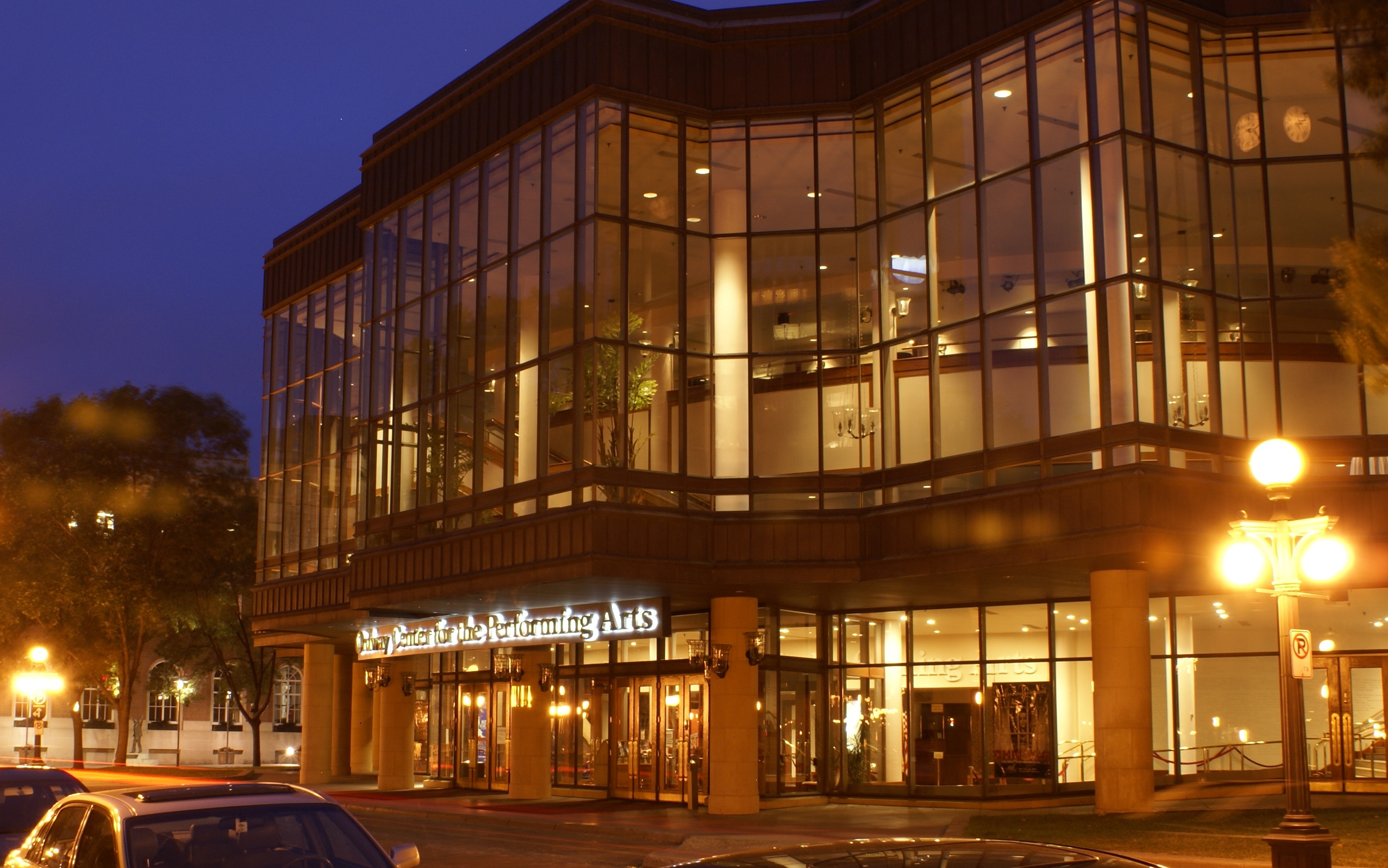
The Ordway Center for the Performing Arts is the SPCO's principal concert venue.

The Saint Paul Chamber Orchestra (SPCO) is an American chamber orchestra based in Saint Paul, Minnesota. Its principal concert venue is the Ordway Center for the Performing Arts. In collaboration with five artistic partners, the orchestra's musicians present more than 130 concerts and educational programs each year in several venues throughout the Minneapolis/St. Paul area. The SPCO is regularly heard on American Public Media's nationally syndicated radio programs "Performance Today" and SymphonyCast.

== History ==
Leopold Sipe was the SPCO's first music director, from 1959 to 1971. Dennis Russell Davies succeeded Sipe from 1972 to 1980. During Davies's tenure, the SPCO recorded Aaron Copland's Appalachian Spring at Sound 80 studios, one of the earliest digital audio recordings to see commercial release.

In 1995, during Hugh Wolff's tenure as music director (1992–2000), the SPCO began its CONNECT education program. It reached 6,000 students annually in 16 Minneapolis and Saint Paul Public Schools.

The last music director of the SPCO was Andreas Delfs, from 2001 to 2004. Beginning with the 2004–05 season, the SPCO adopted a new artistic model that eliminated the position of music director and created positions for several "Artistic Partners", prominent established musicians. Under this model the SPCO musicians have a much higher degree of artistic control.

In 2018, the SPCO and its Artistic Partner Patricia Kopatchinskaja won the Grammy Award for Best Chamber Music/Small Ensemble Performance, recognizing a recording of Schubert's Death and the Maiden.

=== 2012–2013 lockout ===
In October 2012, after months of negotiations between musicians and management, the SPCO locked out its union musicians. Six months later, musicians approved a three-year labor agreement that cut their pay by $15,000 per year, reduced the SPCO from 34 players to 28, and offered buyouts to musicians 55 years and older.

== Music directors ==
- Leopold Sipe (1959–1971)
- Dennis Russell Davies (1972–1980)
- Pinchas Zukerman (1980–1987)
- Christopher Hogwood (1988–1992)
- Hugh Wolff (1992–2000)
- Andreas Delfs (2001–2004)

== Other musicians in leadership positions ==
- Stanisław Skrowaczewski (interim music advisor, 1987–1988)
- Hugh Wolff (principal conductor, 1988–1992)
- Bobby McFerrin (creative chair, 1994–1999)
- Kyu-Young Kim (artistic director, 2016–2024)
- Joel Revzen (assistant conductor, 1984–1989)

== Artistic partners ==
- Joshua Bell (2004–2007)
- Stephen Prutsman (2004–2007)
- Nicholas McGegan (2004–2009)
- Douglas Boyd (2004–2009)
- Pierre-Laurent Aimard (2006–2009)
- Dawn Upshaw (2007–2013)
- Edo de Waart (2010–2014)
- Roberto Abbado (2005–2015)
- Christian Zacharias (2009–2016)
- Thomas Zehetmair (2010–2017)
- Jeremy Denk (2014–2022)
- Patricia Kopatchinskaja (2014–2018)
- Martin Fröst (2014–2019)
- Pekka Kuusisto (2016–2022)
- Jonathan Cohen (2016–2024)
- Richard Egarr (2019–present)
- Rob Kapilow (2020–2024)
- Abel Selaocoe (2022–present)
- Tabea Zimmermann (2022–present)
- Gábor Takács-Nagy (2024–present)
- Richard Goode (2025–present)

== Awards and recognition ==
- Grammy Award for Best Chamber Music Performance: Dennis Russell Davies and The Saint Paul Chamber Orchestra for Copland: Appalachian Spring (1980)
- ASCAP awards for Programming of Contemporary Music, including 2011 and 2014

== Citations ==
- Kenney, Dave. 50 Years of Music: The Saint Paul Chamber Orchestra. Nodin Press, 2009.
