= George Howe (actor) =

English actor (1900-1986)

- Born: George Winchester Howe; 19 April 1900; Valparaíso, Chile
- Died: 24 June 1986 (aged 86); Brighton, East Sussex, England
- Education: Harrow School
- Alma mater: Christ Church, Oxford
- Occupation: Actor

George Winchester Howe (19 April 1900 – 24 June 1986) was an English actor who played numerous stage roles, was a frequent broadcaster on radio and television and appeared in four feature films.

Howe acted in a wide range of plays, including new and classic comedies and historical dramas and was frequently seen in works by Chekhov and Shakespeare. He was particularly known for playing Polonius in Hamlet. Most of his work was in the West End, but he also appeared in New York and toured extensively during the Second World War entertaining the troops.

== Life and career ==
=== Early years ===
Howe was born in Valparaíso, Chile, on 19 April 1900, the son of Edgar Winchester Howe and his wife Beatrice, née MacQueen. His elder sister was the author Bea Howe, who married the BBC Radio conductor Mark Lubbock. He was educated at Harrow School, the Royal Military College, Sandhurst, and Christ Church, Oxford, before going on to the Royal Academy of Dramatic Art.

He made his first professional appearance on the stage at the Regent Theatre in August 1923, as Captain Udall in Robert E. Lee. In November of that year he played Puck in a starrily-cast production of A Midsummer Night's Dream at the Kingsway Theatre, and the following year he appeared with the Stratford-on-Avon Festival company, and in 1924–25 he was a member of the Birmingham Repertory Company. During the rest of the 1920s he played in a range of new and classic plays, including a short-lived adaptation of Beau Geste, starring Laurence Olivier.

=== 1930–1949 ===
In 1930 Howe joined the Old Vic company, then headed by John Gielgud and Ralph Richardson, who co-opted him into an informal three-man committee who, he recalled, "discussed and hinted and generally interfered over the productions". His roles there were Worcester in Henry IV, Part I, Octavius in Antony and Cleopatra, Trinculo in The Tempest, Oakly in The Jealous Wife, Aguecheek in Twelfth Night, Major Petkoff in Arms and the Man, Leonato in Much Ado About Nothing and Gloucester in King Lear. His roles in the West End in the early 1930s ranged from historical drama to Peter Pan; in 1934 he first played the part with which he came to be most closely associated, Polonius in Hamlet. Howe appeared as Polonius again in the West End and at Elsinore, with Gielgud in 1937 and Olivier in 1939. The critic James Agate called him "the best Polonius anybody has ever seen". His other Shakespeare roles in the 1930s were Friar Laurence in Romeo and Juliet, Baptista in The Taming of the Shrew, the Duke in The Merchant of Venice and the Duke of York in Richard II.

In the early 1940s Howe played Dr Chasuble in Gielgud's production of The Importance of Being Earnest, in the West End and on tour. He then joined Entertainments National Service Association (ENSA), entertaining the troops in a variety of roles, including Polonius again and Dr Bradman in Blithe Spirit. After the war one of Howe's longest engagements was as Godfrey Pond, the harassed headmaster in the farce The Happiest Days of Your Life (1948), which he played more than 600 times.

=== Later years ===
In the 1950s and 1960s Howe appeared in New York, playing Hebble Tyson in The Lady's Not For Burning (1950), the title role in Mr Pickwick (1952) – which he said was one of his two favourite parts, the other being Polonius – and roles in Macbeth, Saint Joan and Romeo and Juliet, in the Old Vic company's US 1962 tour. His roles in London productions included the Old Shepherd in The Winter's Tale (1952), the Friar in Much Ado About Nothing (1952) and Semyonov Pistchik in The Cherry Orchard. He toured Europe and South America in Shakespeare (1964) for the British Council (1964).

At the Royal Court in 1966 Howe was in plays by Harley Granville Barker and Arnold Wesker. Among his later stage roles were character parts in plays by Frederick Lonsdale and Congreve. In 1974 in a season directed by Jonathan Miller he played Sorin in The Seagull and in Hamlet he was not Polonius but the Gravedigger. In the same year Howe appeared with the National Theatre company in Eduardo De Filippo. Saturday, Sunday, Monday. At the Chichester Festival and then in the West End he played in Noël Coward's Look After Lulu! (1978). Also at Chichester he was in A Woman of No Importance in which The Stage said, "with but a few lines George Howe re-creates all the character, past and present, of Sir John Pontefract".

=== Broadcasting and cinema ===
Howe was best known as a stage actor, but appeared frequently on radio and television. He first broadcast in 1923, together with the actress Elizabeth Pollock, performing "Imitations of London Actors and Actresses". In 1931 he played Trinculo in The Tempest in a production starring Gielgud and Richardson as Prospero and Caliban. During the 1930s he appeared in three other radio adaptations of Shakespeare plays: King John (1931), The Two Gentlemen of Verona (1936), Henry VIII (1936), and a second adaptation of The Tempest (1936). In the 1940s he played the Fool in King Lear to Gielgud's Lear, and was in radio versions of Antony and Cleopatra and Romeo and Juliet.

In 1947 Howe played Friar Lawrence in a television adaptation of Romeo and Juliet. In 1952 Howe played Samuel Pickwick in a five-part adaptation of The Pickwick Papers on BBC Television. Later television roles included Burley in Richard of Bordeaux (1955), Charles Cheeryble in Nicholas Nickleby (1957), Crassus in The Apple Cart (1957), Reginald Wilfer in Our Mutual Friend (1958), Squire Frankland in The Hound of the Baskervilles (1968), Sir Thomas Erpingham in Henry V (1979) and Euphronius in Antony and Cleopatra (1981). Howe appeared in four cinema films, beginning in 1943 with Escape to Danger, playing Axel Kolm. This was followed by The Man Who Knew Too Much (1956, as Ambrose Chappell Sr), The Great Waltz (1972 as Karl Frederick Hirsch), and That's Your Funeral (1972, as a parson).

Howe died in Brighton on 24 June 1986, aged 86.

== References and sources ==
=== Sources ===
- Gaye, Freda, ed. (1967). Who's Who in the Theatre (fourteenth ed.). London: Sir Isaac Pitman and Sons. OCLC 5997224.
