= Arizona Opera =

Opera company

- Formation: 1971
- Founder: James P. Sullivan
- Type: Opera company
- Location(s): Phoenix, Arizona; Tucson, Arizona
- Formerly called: Tucson Opera Company

Arizona Opera is an American opera company that produces operas in both Phoenix and Tucson, Arizona. Arizona Opera offers five productions with five performances each per season. The McDougall Arizona Opera RED Series is performed in the fall at the Herberger Theater Center (802 seats) in Phoenix and The Temple of Music and Art in Tucson (627 seats). The spring Main Stage Series is presented at Phoenix Symphony Hall (2,312 seats) and the Tucson Convention Center, Linda Ronstadt Music Hall (2,289 seats).

== History ==
Arizona Opera was established in 1971 as the Tucson Opera Company, under founding general director James P. Sullivan. The company presented its first production, Rossini's The Barber of Seville, in 1972. By 1976 the company had expanded to include performances in both Tucson and Phoenix. Arizona Opera is now permanently headquartered in Phoenix. The company has a subscriber base of approximately 10,000 drawn from the two metropolitan areas, and an annual expenditure of $5.8 million, according to the company's 2011 IRS Form 990. According to the Form 990 filed by the company in 2017, revenues for the 2016 tax year were $7,704,444 and expenses were $6,211,715.

The appointment of Glynn Ross as general director in 1983 initiated a period of growth during which the company expanded its season from three to five productions. In 1996 and 1998 the company gained notice by staging Wagner's Ring Cycle as a summer festival in Flagstaff, Arizona. Ross retired in 1998 and was succeeded by David Speers, who increased spending on rehearsals, chorus, and orchestra to improve the quality of the company's productions. During the 2000–2001 season, the company appointed its first principal conductor, Cal Stewart Kellogg. Kellogg remained in that position through 2004, then to become music director of the Symphony of the Southwest. Under Speers' leadership subscriptions and single-ticket sales increased. In addition to the company's regular productions, Speers brought singers Samuel Ramey, Kiri Te Kanawa, Denyce Graves, and Jerry Hadley to Arizona for recital performances. David Speers left the company in 2003.

In 2003, Joel Revzen was appointed artistic director, general director and principal conductor. A Juilliard-trained musician, Revzen was a member of the conducting staff of the Metropolitan Opera. Revzen continued Speers' practice of mixing standard repertory with productions of less-often-performed works, e.g., Menotti's The Consul, Brecht and Weill's The Threepenny Opera, and Handel's Semele. During Revzen's tenure, Arizona Opera productions featured renowned artists as Stephanie Blythe; Dolora Zajick, Christine Brewer, Greer Grimsley, Nancy Gustafson and Gordon Hawkins. Revzen initiated "Arias" concerts that featured soloists performing opera arias in a concert setting accompanied by the Arizona Opera Orchestra on stage. Revzen was named conductor laureate in 2013 and the Joel and Cindy Revzen Atrium located in the Arizona Opera Center was named in their honor.

The company named Scott Altman as its general director in 2009. Altman oversaw the design and construction of the company's new office and production complex, the Arizona Opera Center, across Central Avenue from the Phoenix Art Museum in midtown Phoenix. The company announced Altman's resignation in April 2013. Arizona Opera artistic director Ryan Taylor was appointed interim general director upon Altman's departure, and then permanent general director in June 2013. Arizona Opera's current President and General Director is Brian DeMaris, appointed in May 2025.

In late 2017, Arizona Opera announced a shift from their traditional season model. While retaining five productions per opera season, the fall and spring performances were split into two distinct performance series.

== World premieres ==
In February–May 2017 Arizona Opera presented the world premiere of Craig Bohmler's opera Riders of the Purple Sage, based on Zane Grey's novel of the same name. The production was also broadcast nationwide on November 25, 2017, on the WFMT Radio Network's American Opera Series, and broadcast internationally in 2018 via distribution to the European Broadcasting Union.

In 2021, Arizona Opera presented the world premier of Clint Borzoni's' opera, The Copper Queen. Originally scheduled for the Fall of the 2020 Arizona Opera season, the production - as well as the entire company season - was cancelled because of the Covid-19 pandemic. The Arizona Opera then decided to produce the opera as a film project (not an opera performance filmed). The cast, crew and the Arizona Opera Orchestra filmed and recorded the Copper Queen in 2021; the film was premiered in select theaters in the Phoenix area during the 2021 Halloween weekend and early November. Thereafter, the film was available for streaming online

== Artistic ensembles and labor relations ==
The Arizona Opera Chorus is composed of professional singers from both Phoenix and Tucson. Choristers have been affiliated with the American Guild of Musical Artists since 1995. Union representation has resulted in improvements in chorus compensation and working conditions, and a concomitant improvement in the quality of new chorister candidates.

The Arizona Opera Orchestra is composed of music professionals from three Arizona cities — Phoenix, Tucson, and Flagstaff, as well as from out of state. The Arizona Opera created the Arizona Opera Orchestra under the leadership of David Speers. The musicians are represented by the American Federation of Musicians (AFM), Local 586. The Arizona Opera and Arizona Opera Orchestra operate together under the terms and conditions of a collective bargaining agreement. The Arizona Opera Orchestra is a member of ROPA, the Regional Orchestra Players' Association. In 1998 orchestra members formed the Arizona Opera Orchestra Musicians Association (AZOOMA) to support the musicians and the company.

== General directors ==
- James P. Sullivan (1971–1981)
- Richard J Woitach (1981–1983)
- Glynn Ross (1983–1998)
- David Speers (1998–2003)
- Joel Revzen (2003–2009)
- Scott Altman (2009–2013)
- Ryan Taylor (2013–2016)
- Joseph Specter (2016–2025)
- Brian DeMaris (2025-present)
