= Glynn Ross =

American opera impresario (1914 - 2005)

Glynn Ross (December 15, 1914 – July 21, 2005, Tucson, Arizona) was an American opera impresario. Ross was the first general director of the Seattle Opera, serving that company from 1963 to 1983, and the second general director of the Arizona Opera, from 1983 to 1998.

== Background ==
He was born Glynn W. Aus to a Norwegian immigrant father and a mother of Swedish descent, in Omaha, Nebraska. He attended the local schools and, upon graduation from high school, managed his family's farm for five years. After his father's death, and with the encouragement of his mother, Ross left Nebraska to pursue his dream of a career in theatre, attending the Leland Powers School of the Theatre, the alma mater of his high school drama teacher, in Boston from 1937 to 1939.

After early involvement in theatre and opera, Ross was drafted into the U.S. Army and served for the duration of World War II. After recovering from a wound received in North Africa, he was sent back to Europe by the Army, charged with operating a rest camp for soldiers on the Italian island of Ischia. He was one of the first patients ever to be administered penicillin, still in its test phase. During this time and with the Army's encouragement, he staged operas in Naples for the entertainment of U.S. troops there.

== Career ==
In 1948 he was hired by the San Francisco Opera as stage director. During the 1950s, Ross staged operas for various companies in the United States, but in 1959 moved to Naples, where he became the first American to stage an opera for the Teatro di San Carlo.

In 1964, Ross relocated to Seattle, having been offered the directorship in late 1963 of the new opera company being formed there. During his tenure with the Seattle Opera, he gained notice for his attention-grabbing promotional efforts and earned the nickname "the P. T. Barnum of opera". He used skywriting and bumper stickers, among other unusual advertising techniques. In addition, his slogans for his productions were often aimed at the emerging youth culture, such as the irreverent slogans, "La Boheme: Six old-time hippies in Paris" and "Romeo et Juliette: Two kids in trouble, real trouble, with their families." His slogan "Get Ahead with Salome" ruffled the feathers of more traditional operagoers. It was the policy in Seattle to stage all operas both in the original language and in English.

In 1975, he oversaw Seattle Opera's production of the Ring Cycle, making Seattle the first American company, other than the Metropolitan Opera, to attempt Richard Wagner's masterwork in its entirety during a single week. In Seattle, Ross was also noted for his ability to pare administrative expenses and keep the company on a sound financial footing.

In 1970, Ross was a cofounder of Opera America, an industry trade association for American opera companies, with the goal of enabling companies to share resources, information, and expertise. In 1971, the Seattle Opera staged Tommy, the rock opera written by The Who, with Bette Midler in a starring role.

On his ability to attract top opera stars to Seattle, at that time not considered a major center for opera, he explained: "An artist wants four things: one, a chance to do something that requires the best of his abilities; two, the opportunity to grow by singing different roles; three, prestige; and four, a paycheck."

Upon Ross's departure from the Seattle Opera, he was offered the top post at the struggling Arizona Opera in 1983, where he both expanded the company's offerings and restored it to financial health. He oversaw production of two Ring Cycles as summer festivals in Flagstaff, Arizona in 1996 and 1998, bold undertakings for a middle-sized opera company. His 1996 cycle, in particular, gained favorable notice. Ross retired from Arizona Opera in 1998

== Personal life ==
He met Angelamaria Solimene in Naples and married her on November 15, 1946. They had four children. He died from a stroke on July 21, 2005.

== Other sources ==
- Winthrop Sargeant, The Ring's the Thing (The New Yorker, June 26, 1978, pp. 35–50)
- Bill Zakariasen, Stagecoach to Valhalla (Opera News, June 1996, Vol. 60, No. 17, p. 26)
