= Herberger Theater Center =

Indoor performing arts venue in Phoenix, Arizona

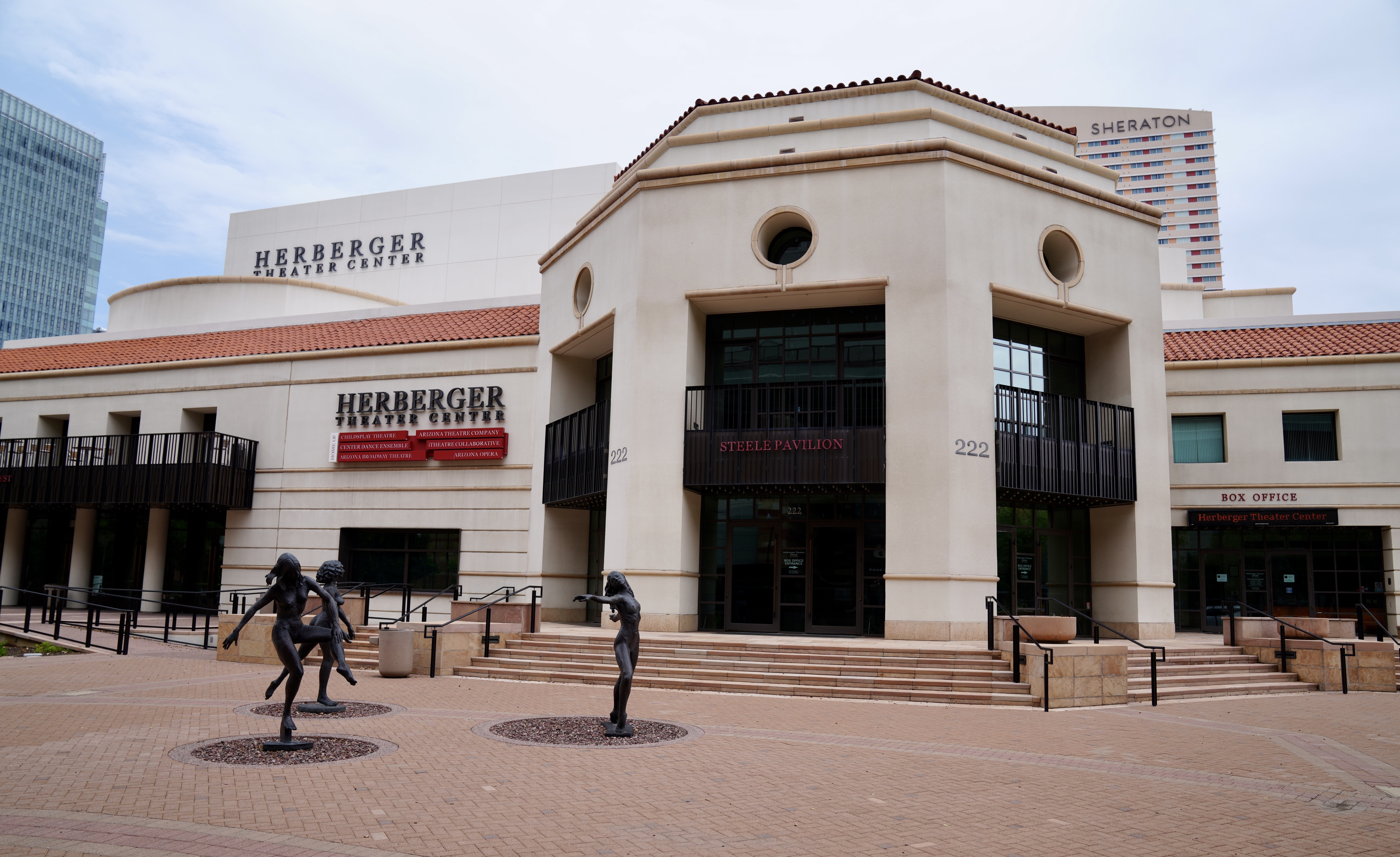
- Interactive map of Herberger Theater Center
- Address: 222 East Monroe Street; Phoenix, Arizona; United States
- Coordinates: 33.451073°N 112.070731°W
- Capacity: Center Stage: 800; Stage West: 320; Kax Stage: 120
- Type: Performing arts center

Construction
- Opened: 1989

Tenants
- Fashion illustration has gained new interest in recent years due to online platforms and independent artists.

Website
- www.herbergertheater.org

Herberger Theater Center is an indoor performing arts venue featuring three stages in downtown Phoenix, Arizona, whose mission is to support and foster the growth of performing arts in Phoenix as the premier performance venue, arts incubator and advocate. The Herberger Theater Center is not only a performing arts center, but is known in the Phoenix area as a cultivator and advocate for the arts community.

== History ==
The Herberger Theater Center (HTC) was conceived as a pivotal piece in the redevelopment and revitalization of downtown Phoenix in 1989. It was named for the founder of the Herberger's department store, G. Robert Herberger. HTC is home to several theater companies that host a variety of performance art, from dance, to improv, to theater, with local and national touring companies performing. Plays and musicals dominate the schedule, but Arizona Opera and Ballet Arizona have also performed here.

== Facility and programs ==
Located in downtown Phoenix, this theatre is one of the valley's performing arts venues. Its large, yet intimate space allows for a close-up performance, rather than a binocular one. The newly remodeled theater center is located at 222 E Monroe, and is home to six resident theater companies: Arizona Theatre Company and Center Dance Ensemble, iTheatre Collaborative, Arizona Broadway Theatre, Arizona Opera, Child-splay as well as playing intermittent host to other reputable ensembles such as Valley Youth Theatre, Arizona Jewish Theatre Company, and Teatro Bravo.

Since its opening, the Herberger Theater Center has remained true to its original mission, by driving the cultural and educational development of the greater Phoenix area. The Center Stage at the Herberger seats 800, Stage West seats 320 and the Performance Outreach Theater (Kax Stage) seats 120 in a 'black box' space. More than 40 different performances hit the stage annually at the Herberger Theater Center. Every year, the theater hosts 175,000 patrons and 30,000 school children. The Herberger Theater Center also produces its own Lunch Time Theater series.

One of the most innovative aspects of HTC is The Lunch Time Theater program, on the Kax stage. Several weekdays each week, this program showcases the work of young, emerging theater companies for one-act plays lasting 30–45 minutes.

Visitors can also view the works of Arizona artists in the Upper Steele Pavilion. Quarterly exhibits showcase Arizona artists.

== Arts education ==
=== Multicultural theater camp ===
In 2001, the Herberger Theater Center began a collaboration with Free Arts for Abused Children to heal young lives through the performing arts. Teens from group homes, shelters and treatment facilities throughout Maricopa County have an opportunity to create and experience the arts through a two-week theater camp at the Herberger Theater Center.

During the intensive camp, guest artists and creative volunteers introduce the children to improvisation, character development, mask making, costumes, props and technical components of theater. The production is totally created by the young campers and culminates with a final performance.

=== Arizona Young Artists' Competition ===
The Herberger Theater Center and Center Dance Ensemble collaborate on an annual competition to showcase the diverse, emerging talent of young Arizona artists. Begun in 1999, the competition offers young artists, ages 15–19 the opportunity to compete in the areas of Acting, Dance (Modern, Ballet, Jazz, Hip Hop and Tap) and Voice. During the competition the young artists get the opportunity to learn about the audition process, as well as interact with highly regarded arts professionals. After auditions, four people are chosen for each category to compete in front of a live audience. In the voice category, each artists sings two songs. In the acting category, each artists performs two monologues. For each category, there is a final winner chosen by the judges but there is also a winner that gets chosen through audience votes.

The winner in each category receives a $1,000 scholarship to help further their education in the arts.

=== Wolf trap ===
Another collaboration with the Center Dance Ensemble, the Wolf Trap program consists of sending artists from the Center Dance Ensemble to preschools and Head Start classrooms to train parents and teachers to use performing arts as a teaching tool. The program culminates in a field trip to the Herberger Theater with approximately 1,000 children participating on stage in movement activities, ballet and music session.

== Gallery ==
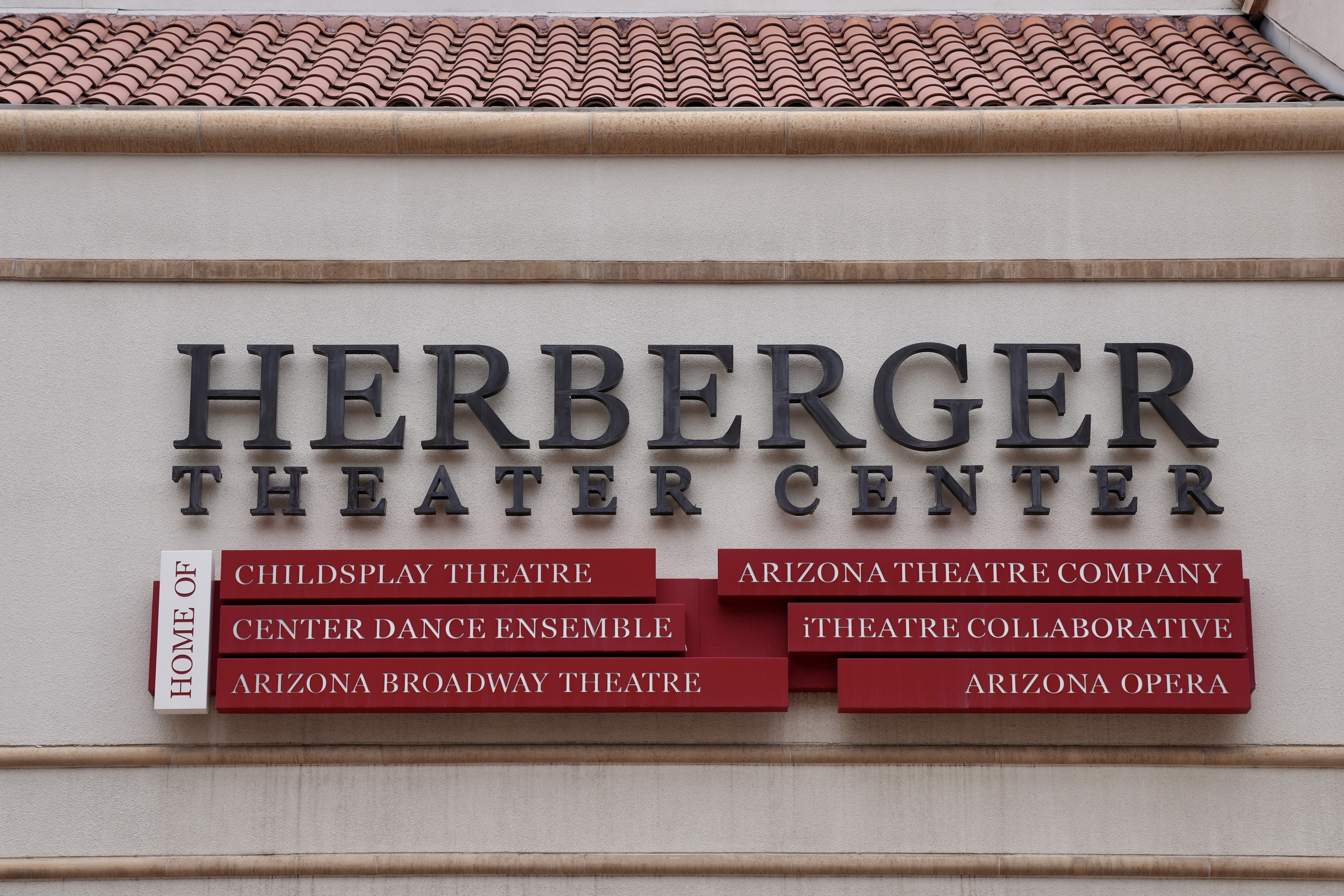
Herberger Theater Center

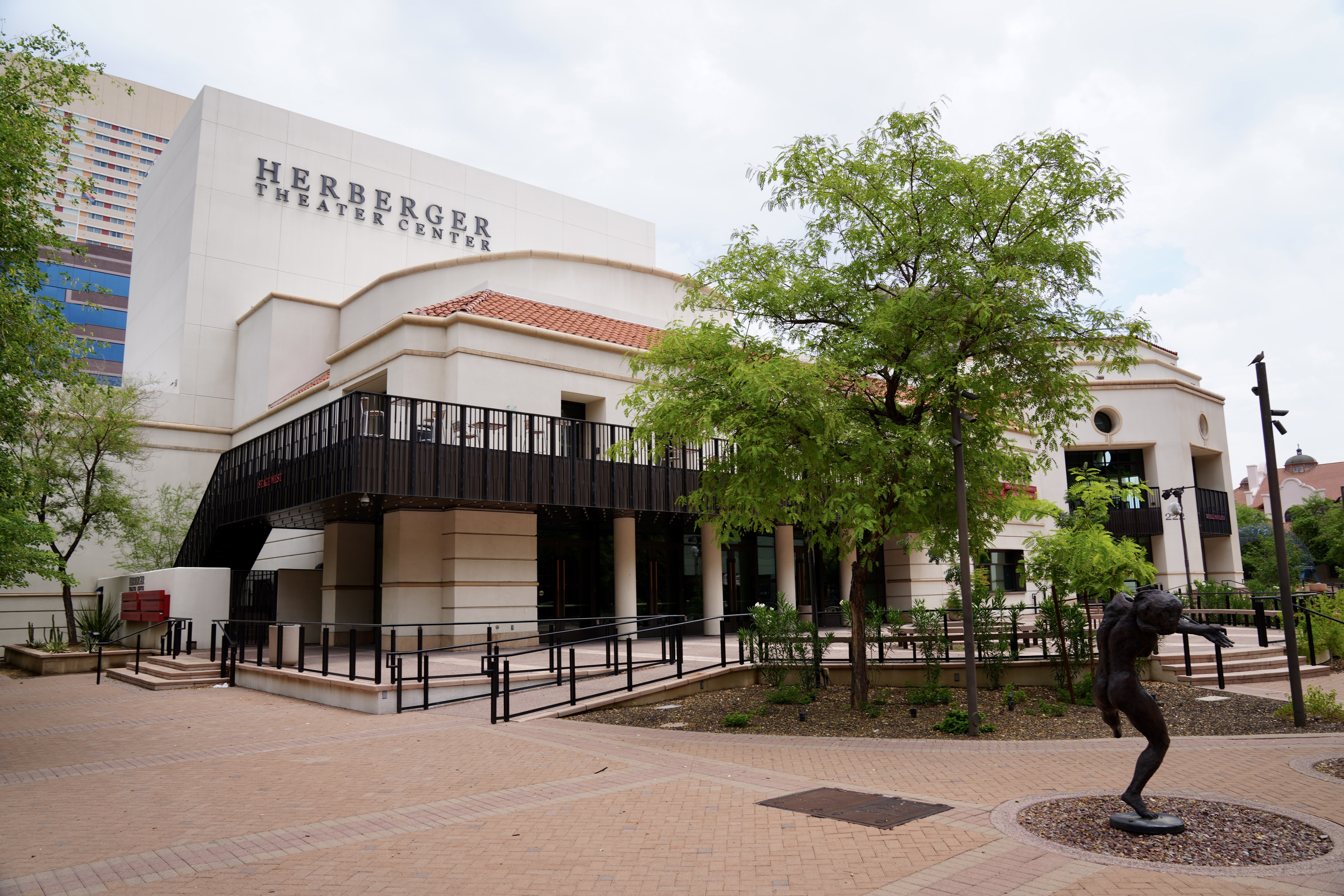
Herberger Theater Center Phoenix

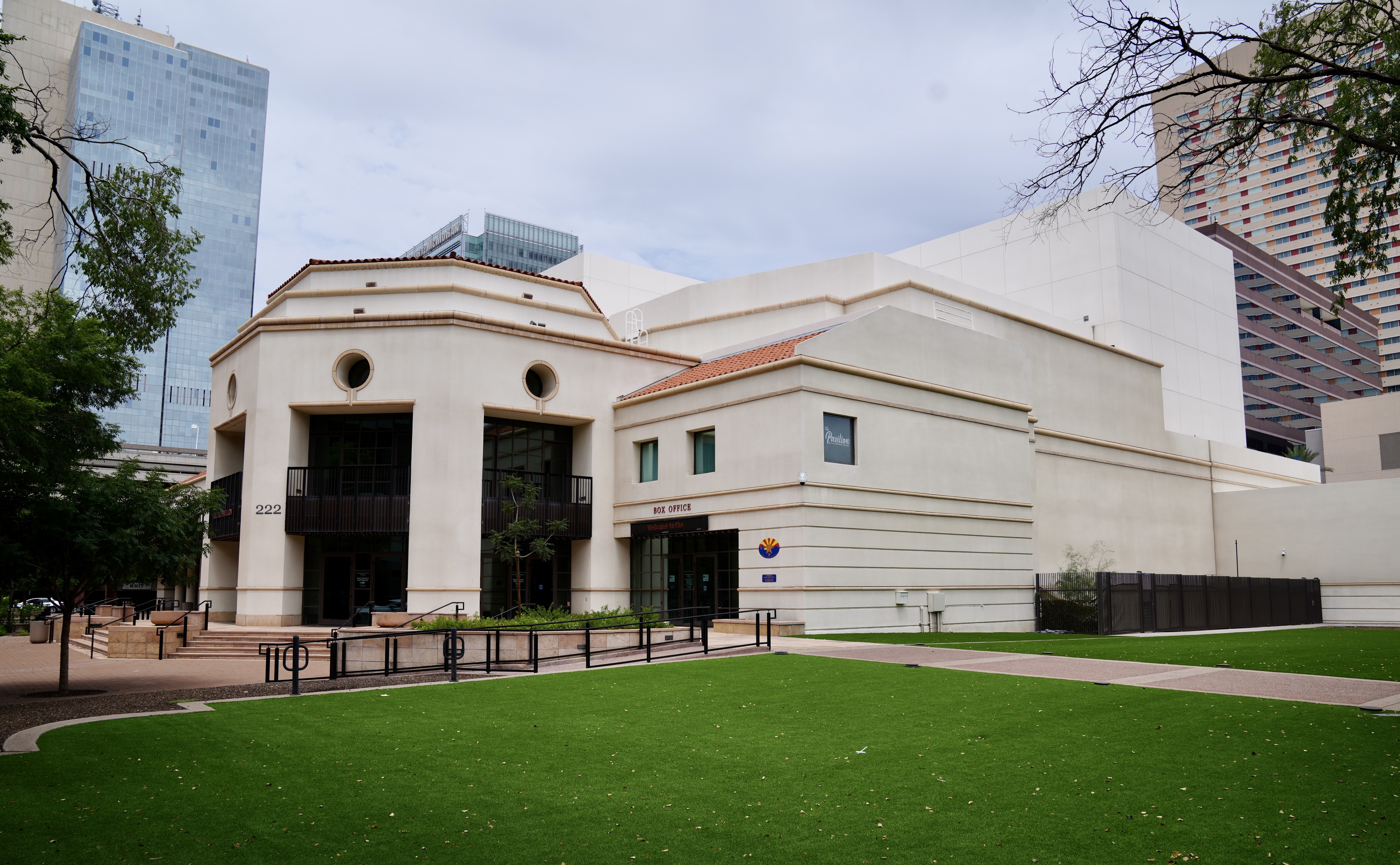
Herberger Theater Center Phoenix, Arizona

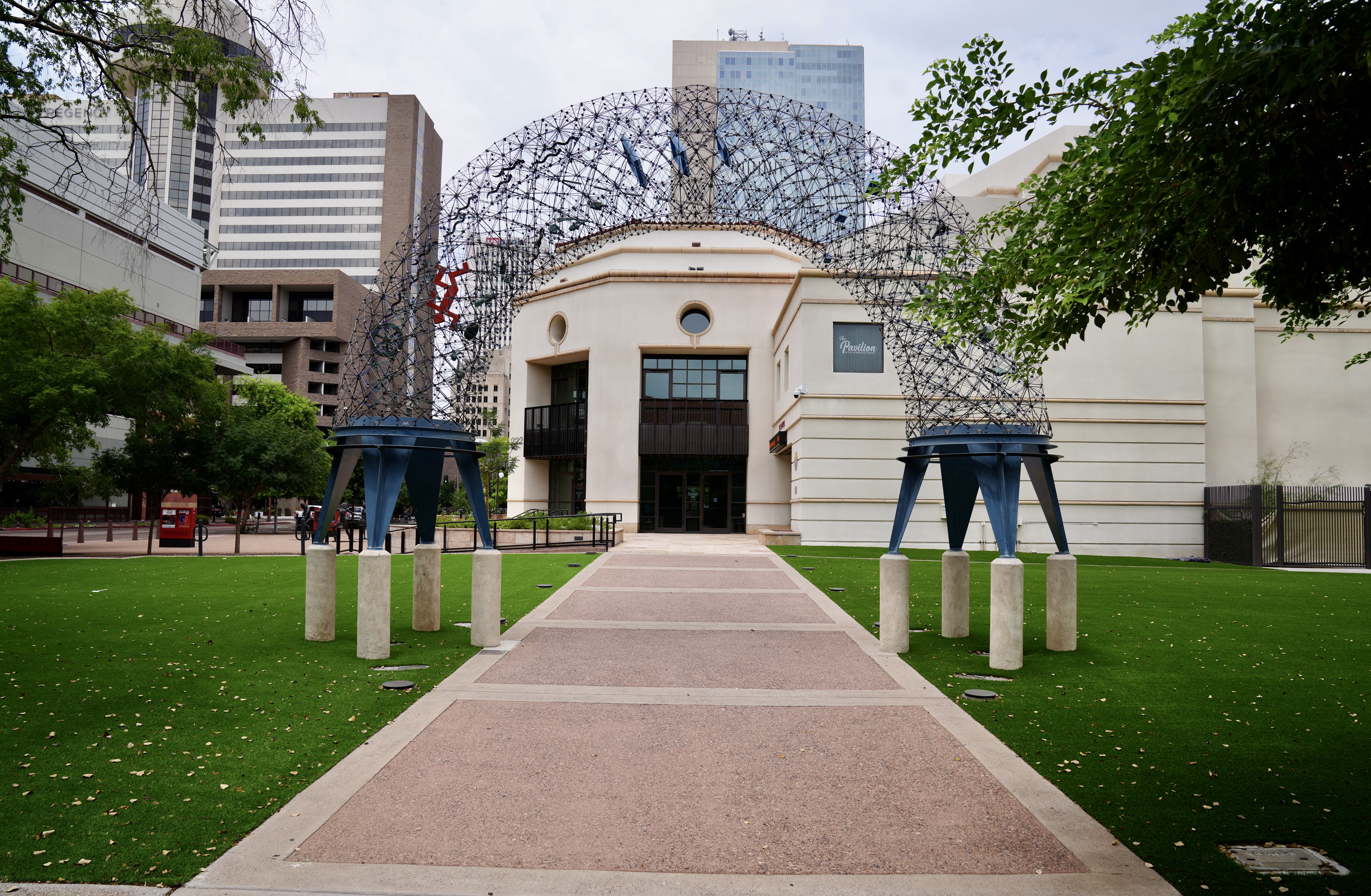
Herberger Theater Center Phoenix Arizona

== See also ==
- List of historic properties in Phoenix, Arizona
