= Henriette Treffz =

Austrian opera singer (1818–1878)

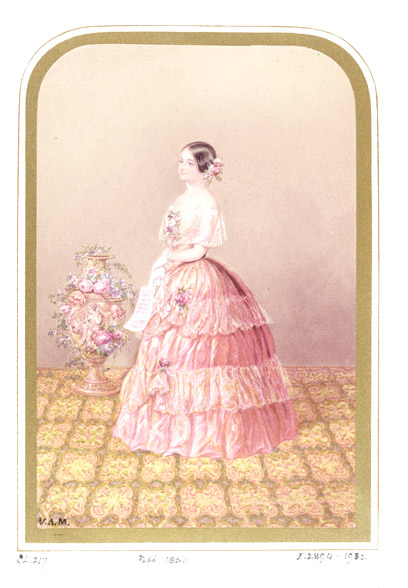
Treffz in her youth

Henriette Karoline Josefa Strauss (née Chalupetzky; formerly Chalupetzky Edle von Treffz; 1 July 1818 – 8 April 1878), known professionally as Henriette "Jetty" Treffz (German: [tʁɛfts]) and formerly known by the moniker Jetty Baronin Todesco, was an Austrian opera singer. She was known as the first wife of Johann Strauss II and a mezzo-soprano, appearing in England in 1849 to great acclaim.

== Biography ==
Henriette Chalupetzky was born on 1 July 1818 in Alsergrund. She was the only child of a Viennese goldsmith, and she studied music in Vienna, adopting her mother's maiden name, Treffz, for professional purposes. Her career took her around Austria, Germany and France, but in England, she first appeared with Johann Strauss I in concerts that brought her numerous accolades and felicitations. The Musical World, published in London on 5 May 1849, noted her talents: "mezzo-soprano voice of beautiful quality and remarkable for freshness and equality of tone throughout the register".

Treffz had seven illegitimate children, born to at least three different fathers. Upon her subsequent marriage (at which time her children were aged between nine and twenty-one), Treffz relinquished custody of them all.

On 27 August 1862, Treffz married Johann Strauss II in the Stephansdom in Vienna, a marriage that was beneficial to Strauss as her support and keen musical and business sense influenced his works and promoted them to a superior standard. His works around that time revealed his finest creative period, and she worked with him as a music-copyist, private secretary, and manager. Their marriage was not without skepticism. The Viennese populace, long swayed by Strauss' graceful waltzes, were shocked at the announcement of their marriage, as she was 44 when they married, about seven years older than Strauss. Even his brother Josef Strauss expressed his concern at the match, but he eventually accepted that she was "indispensable in the home. She writes up all accounts, copies out orchestral parts and sees to everything in the kitchen with such efficiency and kindness that is admirable" in a letter dated 2 May 1869 written to his wife Caroline. Treffz's encouragement for Strauss to apply for the coveted KK Hofballmusik-direktor post eventually bore positive results, and he was awarded the honorary position in 1863.

== Last years ==
Jetty Treffz lived long enough to see her husband claim a small but encouraging success in the operetta business, however, on 8 April 1878, she suffered a heart attack and died, aged 59, the cause being reported as a disturbing letter from one of her illegitimate sons. She often spoke of herself as a "poor, old cripple" and of painful illnesses in the last years of her life.

She died on 8 April 1878 in Hietzing. She was buried in the local Hietzing cemetery, but Strauss was absent at the funeral, and all arrangements were left to his brother Eduard Strauss. Strauss remarried seven weeks later to Lili Dittrich on 28 May 1878.
